= Streamliner =

Vehicle incorporating streamlining in a shape providing reduced air resistance

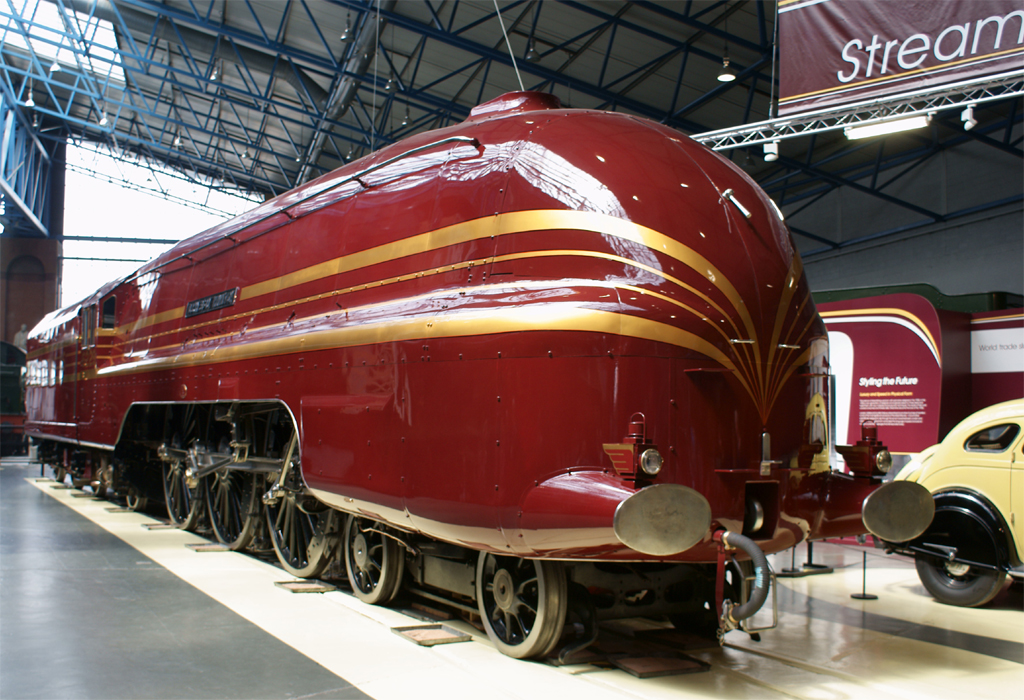
Preserved British steam locomotive of the former London, Midland and Scottish (LMS) Railway, Princess Coronation Class No. 6229 Duchess of Hamilton, an example of a streamliner

A streamliner is a vehicle incorporating streamlining in a shape that provides reduced air resistance. The term is applied to high-speed railway trainsets of the 1930s to 1950s, and to their successor "bullet trains". Less commonly, the term is applied to fully faired upright and recumbent bicycles. As part of the Streamline Moderne trend, the term was applied to passenger cars, trucks, and other light-, medium-, or heavy-duty vehicles. Vehicle streamlining has become so prevalent that it is no longer an outstanding characteristic. In land speed racing, it is a term applied to the long, slender, custom-built, high-speed vehicles with enclosed wheels.

== Trains ==
=== Before World War II ===
==== Europe ====
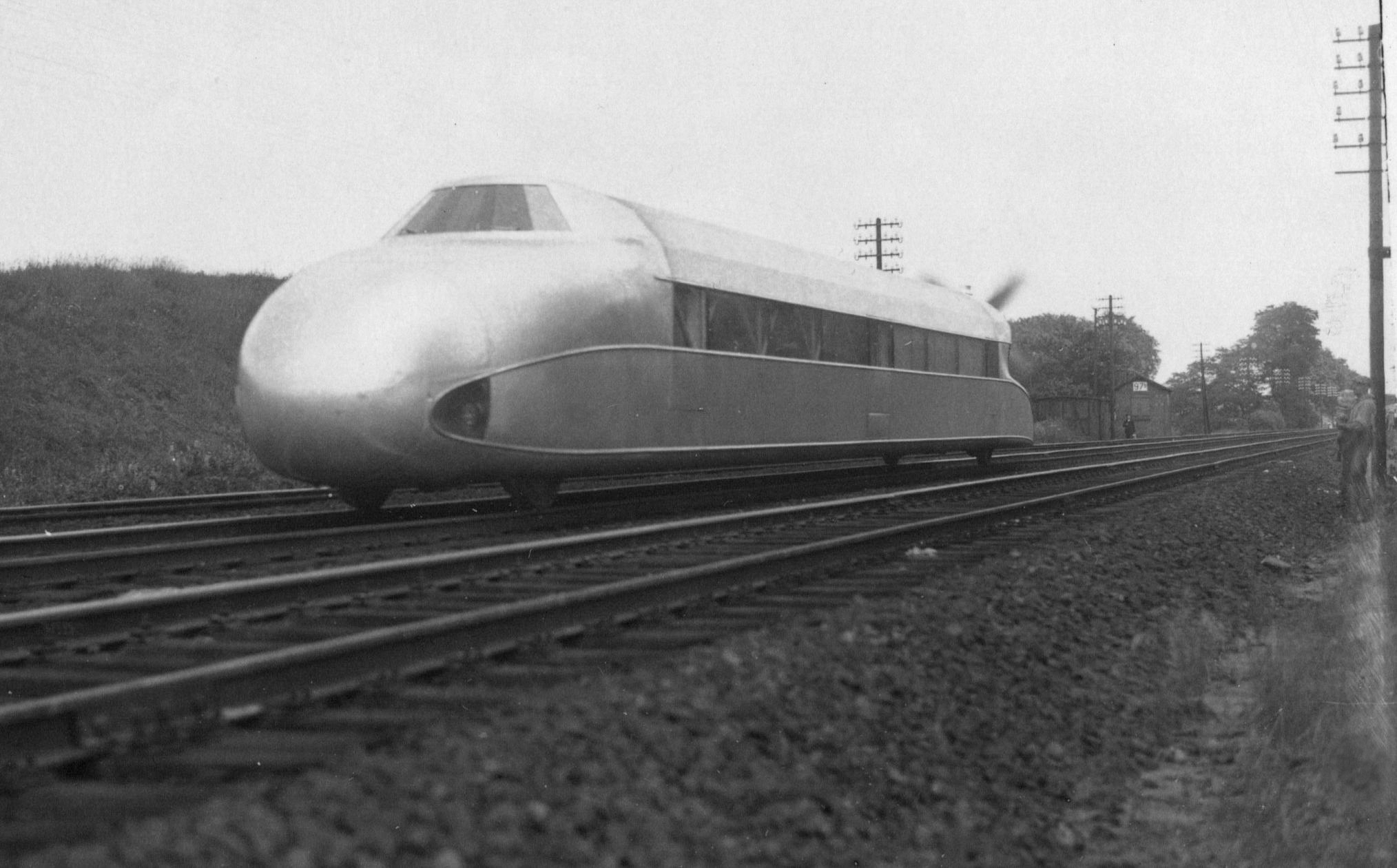
The Schienenzeppelin on the Erkrath-Hochdahl steep ramp in 1931

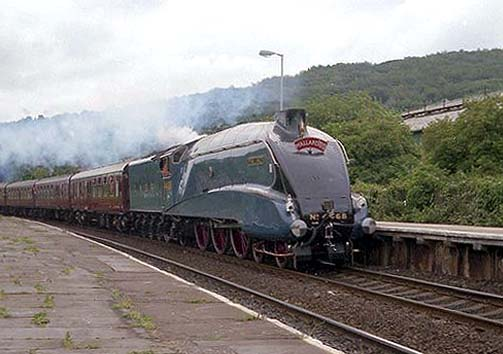
LNER Class A4 4468 Mallard traveling through Keighley in West Yorkshire in 1988

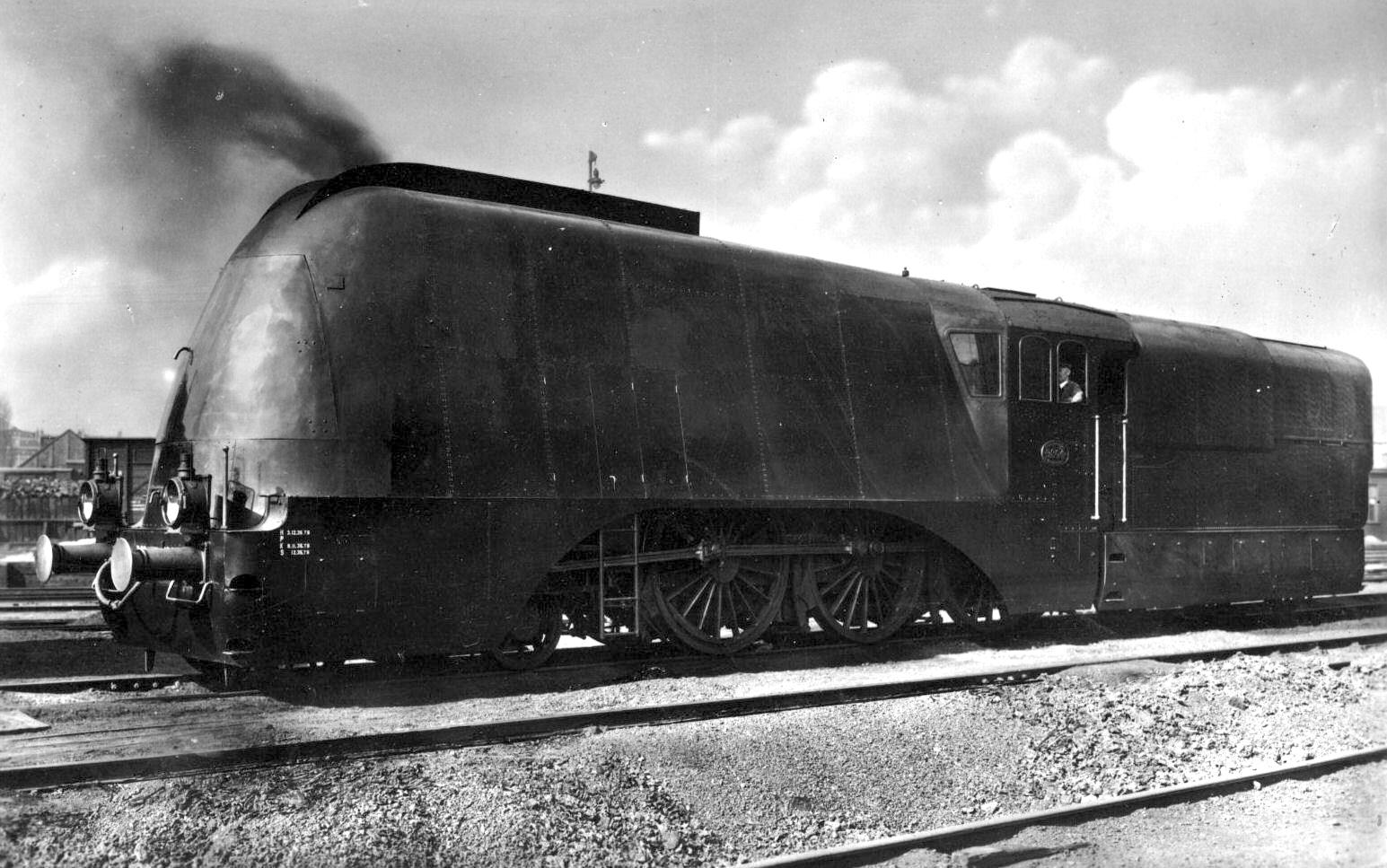
Nederlandse Spoorwegen class 3700/3800 steam locomotive 3804, circa 1936

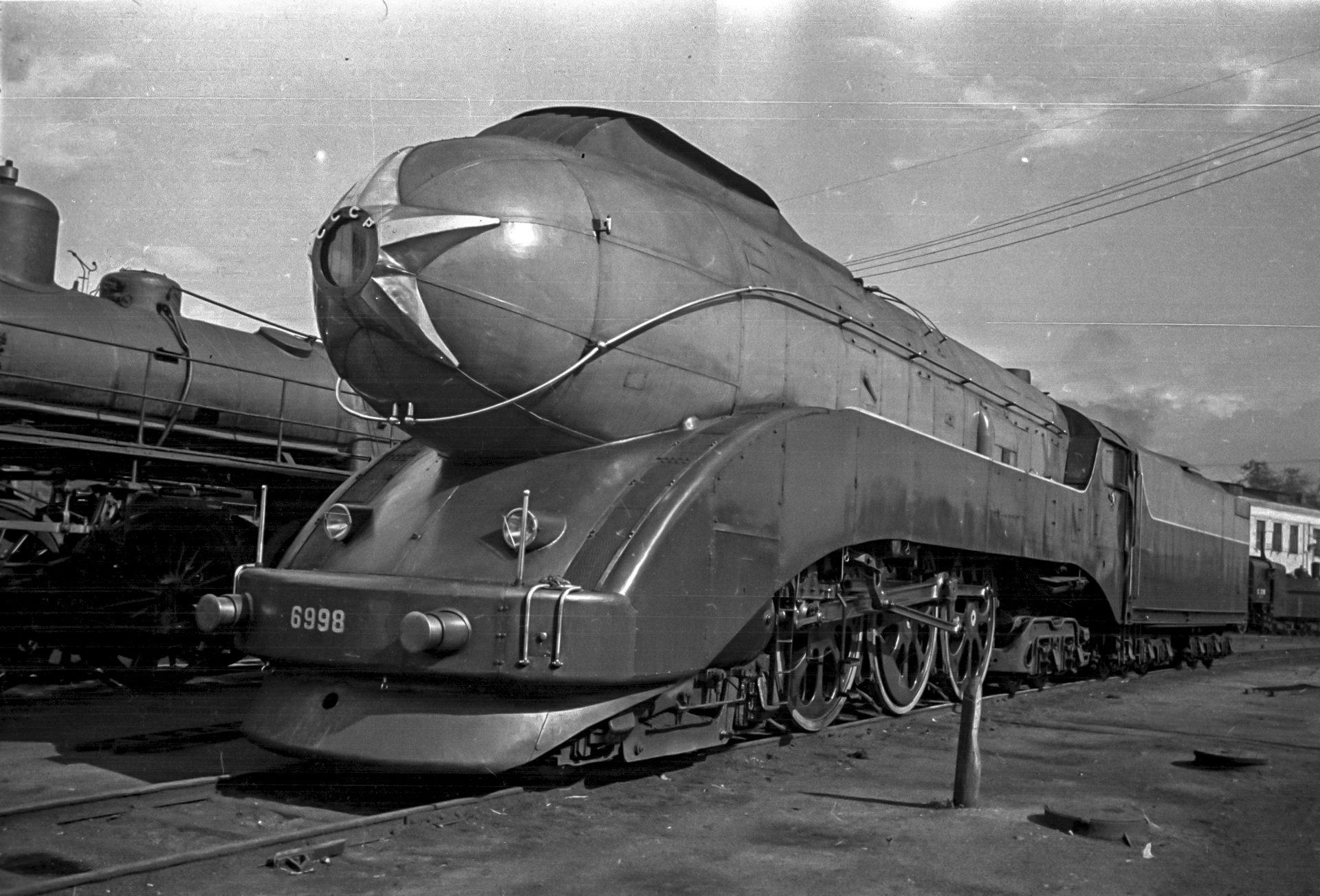
Pre-WWII Soviet type 2-3-2V

- Germany, 1930: The first high-speed streamliner in Germany was the Schienenzeppelin, an experimental propeller-driven single railcar, built in 1930. On 21 June 1931, the car set a speed record of 230.2 km/h (143.0 mph) on a run between Berlin and Hamburg. In 1932, the propeller was removed, and a hydraulic system was installed. The Schienenzeppelin achieved 180 km/h (112 mph) in 1933.
  - 1932: The Schienenzeppelin led to the construction of the diesel-electric DRG Class SVT 877 "Flying Hamburger". This two-car train set had 98 seats and a top speed of 160 km/h (99 mph). In regular service with the Deutsche Reichsbahn, starting on 15 May 1933, this train ran the 286 kilometres (178 miles) between Hamburg and Berlin in 138 minutes with an average speed of 124.4 km/h (77.3 mph).
  - 1934/1935: The SVT 877 was the prototype for the DRG Class SVT 137, first built in for use in the FDt express train service. In test drives, the SVT 137 "Bauart Leipzig" set a world speed record of 205 km/h (127 mph) in 1936. The fastest regular service with the SVT 137 was between Hannover and Hamm with an average speed of 132.2 km/h (82.1 mph). This service lasted until 22 August 1939.
  - 1935: Henschel & Son, a major manufacturer of steam locomotives, introduced the 4-6-4 DRG Class 05 high-speed streamliner locomotives for use on the Deutsche Reichsbahn Frankfurt am Main to Berlin route. Three examples were built in 1935–36. Built for top speeds of over 85 mph (137 km/h), the DRG Class 05 locomotives soon proved much faster in test runs. The DRG 05-002 made seven runs in 1935–36 during which it attained top speeds of more than 177 km/h (110 mph) with trains up to 254 t (280 short tons) weight.
  - 11 May 1936: The DRG 05-002 set the world speed record for steam locomotives after reaching 200.4 km/h (124.5 mph) on the Berlin–Hamburg line while hauling a 197-tonne (217-short-ton) train. The locomotive's engine power was more than 2,535 kW (3,399 ihp).
  - 30 May 1936: The DRG 05-002 set an unbroken start-stop speed record for steam locomotives. During the return run from a 190-kilometre-per-hour (120 mph) test on the Berlin-Hamburg route it covered the ~113 kilometres (70 mi) from Wittenberg to a signal stop before Berlin-Spandau in 48 min 32 s, meaning an average of 139.4 km/h (86.6 mph) between start and stop. The DRG 05-002 was, for a time, the official holder of the world top speed record for steam locomotives.
- Austria/Poland, 1933: In the 1930s, streamlined Luxtorpeda diesel units built by Austrian and later Polish manufacturers reached speeds of up to 140 km/h (87 mph) in Poland, but there were no tracks for such speeds.
  - 1937: The first Polish streamlined steam locomotive Pm36-1 (140 km/h or 87 mph) pulled the Nord Express between Poland and France (Paris). This locomotive was awarded a golden medal at the World Expo in Paris in 1937.
- United Kingdom, 1934: Development of streamlined passenger services began in the UK. The Great Western Railway introduced relatively low-speed streamlined railcars (known as "flying bananas").
  - 1935 The London and North Eastern Railway (LNER) introduced the "Silver Jubilee" service using streamlined A4 class steam locomotives and full-length trains rather than railcars.
  - 1937: The London, Midland and Scottish Railway (LMS) introduced its "Coronation Scot" service using the Princess Coronation Class streamlined locomotives, achieving a speed of 114 mph (183 km/h) near Crewe on its inaugural run.
  - 1938: The LNER locomotive Mallard, which had been built for "Silver Jubilee" service, set on a test run a still unsurpassed official record for the highest top speed attained by a steam locomotive, 126 mph (203 km/h).
- Czechoslovakia, 1934: Czechoslovak State Railways ordered two motor railcars with a maximum speed of 130 km/h (81 mph). They were constructed by the Tatra company, which was producing the first streamlined mass-produced automobile, the Tatra 77, at that time. The railcar project was led by Tatra chief designer Hans Ledwinka and received a streamlined design by Paul Jaray. The railcars were unique thanks to the patented transmission system invented by Josef Sousedík—at lower speeds, it operated like a petrol-electric transmission, and at around 82 km/h (51 mph), it automatically switched to direct mechanical transmission without any gears. The railcars thus had good acceleration, low fuel consumption, and were easy to drive. Both ČSD Class M 290.0 were delivered in 1936; one of them reached 148 km/h (92 mph) during a test run. They were run on the prominent Czechoslovak route Bratislava-Prague under the "Slovenská strela" (Slovak for "Slovak Arrow") brand.
- Italy, 1934: State-owned railway company Ferrovie dello Stato (FS) developed the FS Class ETR 200, a three-unit electric streamliner. The first of those trains entered revenue service in 1937.
  - 6 December 1937: An ETR 200 made a top speed of 201 km/h (125 mph) between Campoleone and Cisterna on the run Rome-Naples.
  - 1939: The ETR 212 made 203 km/h (126 mph). The 219 km (136 mi) journey from Bologna to Milan was made in 77 minutes, meaning an average of 171 km/h (106 mph).
- Netherlands, 1934: Nederlandse Spoorwegen (NS) introduced in the Materieel 34 (DE3), a three-unit 140-kilometre-per-hour (87 mph) streamlined diesel-electric trainset. An electric version, Materieel 36, went into service in 1936.
  - 1930s: The NS developed in the 1930s a streamlined version of the class 3700/3800 steam locomotive, nicknamed "potvis" (sperm whale).
  - 1940: The "Dieselvijf" (DE5), a 160-kilometre-per-hour (99 mph) top speed five-unit diesel-electric trainset based on DE3, completed the Dutch streamliner fleet. In test runs, a DE5 ran 175 km/h (109 mph)
  - 1940: The electric Materieel 40 was built.
- Soviet Union, 1937: On the occasion of the twentieth anniversary of the October Revolution, the Soviet Kolomna Locomotive Works produced two examples of the wind-tunnel designed SŽD series 2-3-2K (4-6-4 Whyte Notation) streamliner locomotive for Moscow-Leningrad service. In testing, it was shown to reach speeds greater than 150 km/h (93 mph)—170 km/h (110 mph) in a test ride, and it entered service in 1938. Production of the series was canceled with the onset of World War II.
  - 1938: One example of SŽD series 2-3-2V (4-6-4 Whyte Notation) express train locomotive, with bullet-like fairing, was produced by Voroshilovgrad Locomotive Works. In 1957 it reached a speed of 175 km/h (109 mph) in test ride, what was the last steam locomotive record in the USSR.

==== United States ====
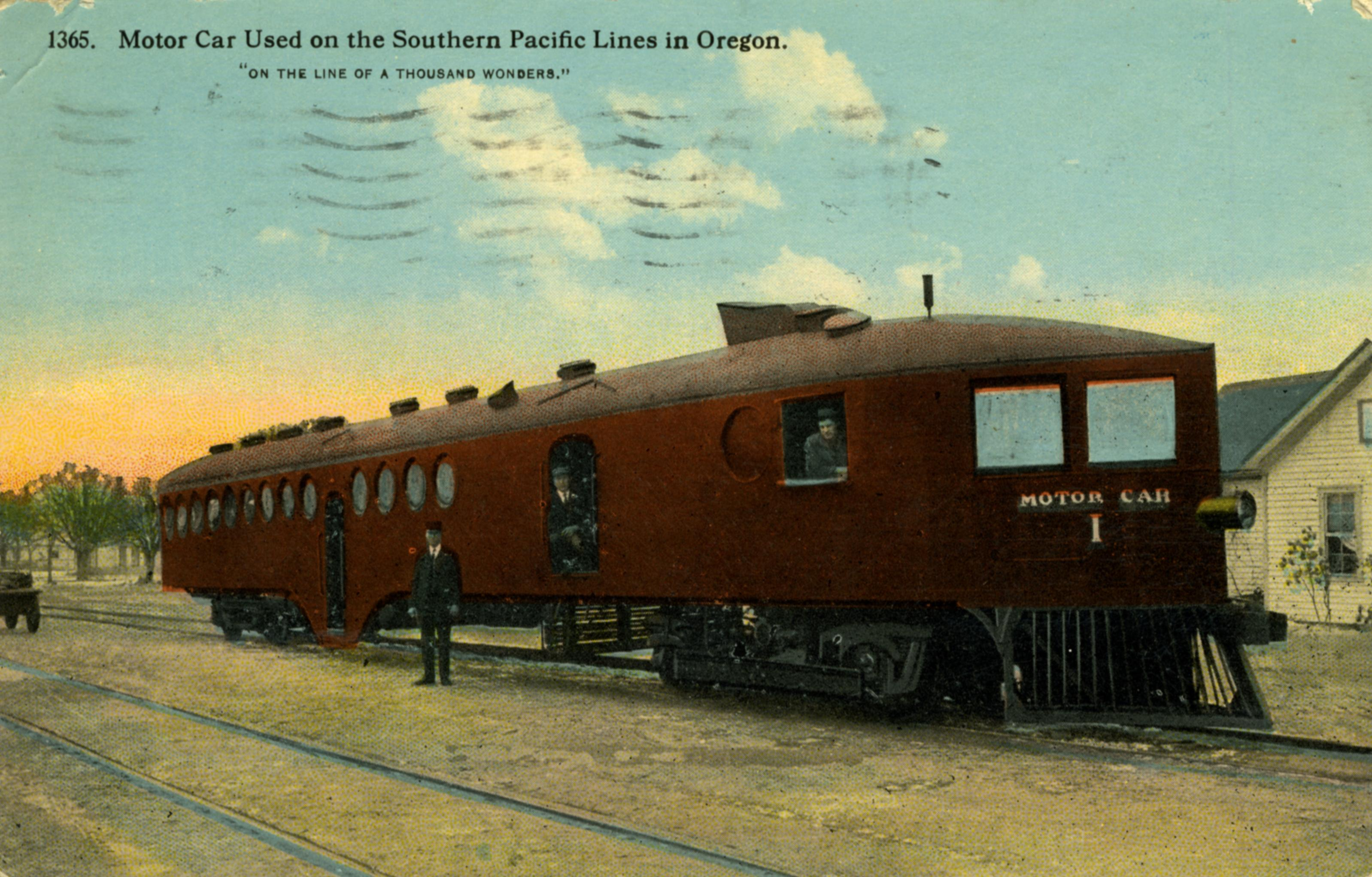
A colorized postcard showing a McKeen motor car serving the Southern Pacific Railroad in Oregon circa 1910

The earliest known streamlined rail equipment in the United States were McKeen rail motorcars that the company built for the Union Pacific and the Southern Pacific Railroads between 1905 and 1917. Most McKeen cars sported a pointed "wind splitter" front, a rounded rear and round porthole style windows in a style that was as much nautically as aerodynamically inspired. The McKeen cars were unsuccessful because the internal combustion drive technology for that application was unreliable at the time. Further, the lightweight frames dictated by the cars' limited power tended to break. Streamlined rail motorcars would appear again in the early 1930s after the internal combustion-electric propulsion technology that General Electric developed and that the Electro-Motive Company (EMC) promoted became the accepted technology for use in rail motorcars in the 1920s.

Streetcar builders sought to build electric cars with improved speed for interurban lines through the 1920s. In 1931, the J. G. Brill Company introduced the Bullet, a lightweight, wind-tunnel designed car with a rounded front that could run either singly or in multiple-unit sets, capable of speeds over 90 mph (145 km/h). Although Depression-era economics cut into sales, the design was highly successful in service, lasting into the 1980s.

In 1925, the recently formed Pullman Car & Manufacturing Corporation experimented with lightweight self-propelled railcars in co-operation with the Ford Motor Company concurrent with Ford's development of its Trimotor aircraft. In 1931, Pullman enlisted the services of the Trimotor design contributor William Bushnell Stout to apply airplane fuselage design concepts to railcars. The result was the Railplane (not the Bennie Railplane), a streamlined self-propelled railcar with a tapered cross-section, lightweight tubular aluminum space frame and duralumin skin. In testing with the Gulf, Mobile and Northern Railroad in 1932, it reportedly reached 90 mph (145 km/h). The Union Pacific had been seeking improvements to self-propelled railcars based on European design ideas. The performance of the Railplane encouraged the railroad to increase its efforts in partnership with Pullman-Standard.

In 1931, the Budd Company reached an agreement with the French tire company Michelin to produce pneumatic-tired rail motorcars in the US, as an improvement on the heavy, underpowered and shimmy-prone "doodlebugs" that ran on American tracks. In that endeavor, Budd would produce lightweight rail equipment utilizing unibody construction and the high strength alloy stainless steel, enabled by shot welding, a breakthrough in electrical welding technique. The venture produced articulated power-trailer car sets with streamlined styling, which left the Budd Company just a (much) more powerful engine away from producing a history-making streamlined trainset.

The Great Depression caused a catastrophic loss of business for the rail industry as a whole and for manufacturers of motorized railcars whose primary markets, branch line services, were among the first to be cut. The interests of lightweight equipment manufacturers and rail operators therefore focused on the development of a new generation of lightweight, high-speed, internal combustion-electric powered streamlined trainsets that were primarily designed for mainline service.

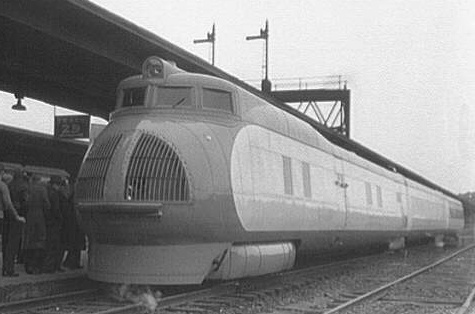
A Union Pacific M-10000 (1934)

The Chicago, Burlington & Quincy Railroad (Burlington) and the Union Pacific sought to increase the efficiency of their passenger services by looking to the lightweight, petroleum-powered technology that Budd and Pullman-Standard were developing. The Union Pacific named its project the M-10000 (designated first as The Streamliner and later as the City of Salina when in revenue service from 1935 to 1941). The Burlington initially named its first train the Burlington Zephyr. The two railroads' trains each entered service as three-car articulated sets (including the power car). The Winton Engine Corporation, a subsidiary of General Motors (GM), manufactured the engines for both locomotives. The prime mover for the Burlington Zephyr's diesel-electric propulsion was a new 600 hp diesel engine. The Union Pacific's M-10000 had a 600-horsepower (450 kW) spark-ignition engine that ran on "petroleum distillate", a fuel similar to kerosene. The two trainsets were star attractions at the 1934 World's Fair ("A Century of Progress") in Chicago, Illinois. During its set's demonstration period, the Union Pacific named the M-10000 as the Streamliner, providing the first use of the term with respect to trains. The Streamliner's publicity tour in February–May 1934 attracted over a million visitors and gained attention in national media as the herald of a new era in rail transportation.

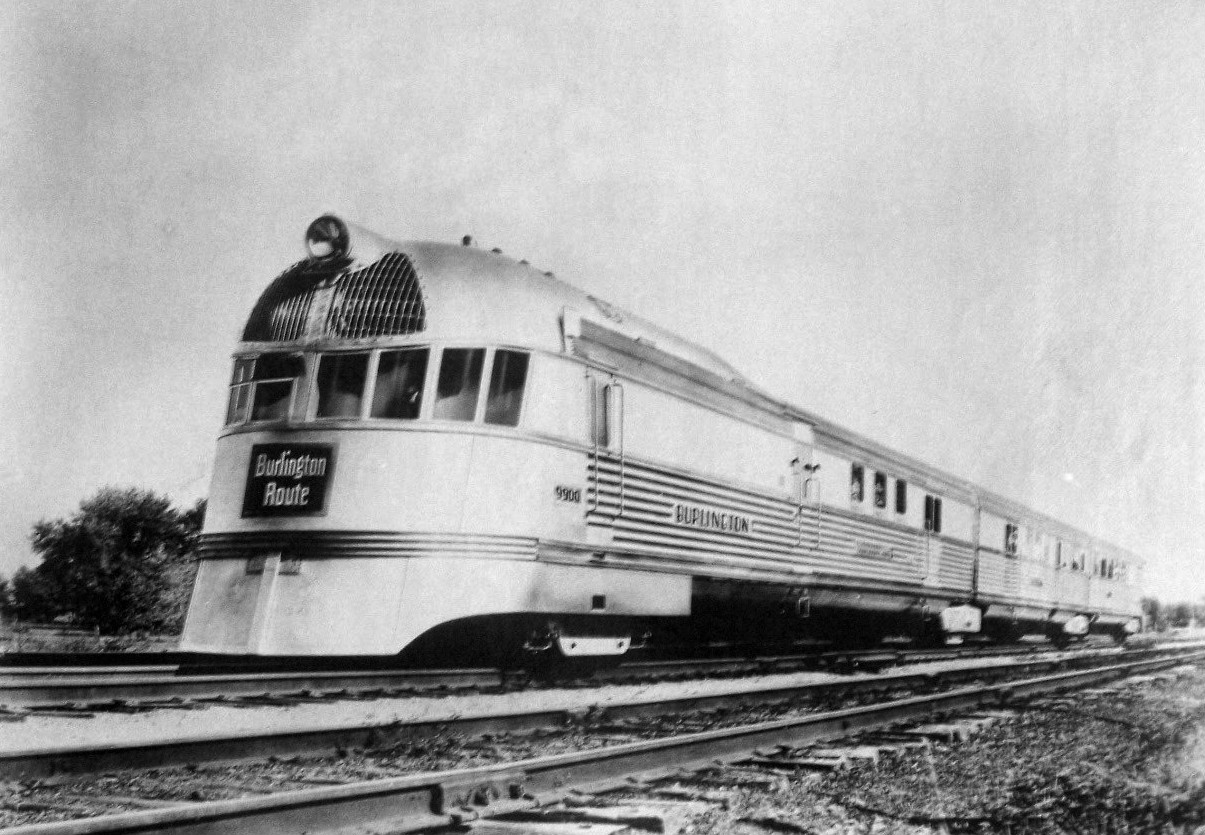
A Budd Company photograph of the Burlington Zephyr (1935)

On 26 May 1934, the Burlington's Zephyr made a record-breaking "Dawn to Dusk" run from Denver, Colorado, to Chicago for its grand entry as a Century of Progress exhibit. The Zephyr covered the distance in 13 hours, reaching a top speed of 112.5 mph (181.1 km/h) and running an average speed of 77.6 mph (124.9 km/h). The fuel for the run cost US$14.64 at 4¢ per U.S. gallon (equivalent to $352 and $1 per gallon respectively in 2025 after inflation). The Burlington's event was covered live on radio and drew large, cheering crowds as the "silver streak" zipped by. Adding to the sensation of the Zephyr were the striking appearance of its fluted stainless steel bodywork and its raked, rounded, aerodynamic front end that symbolized its modernity. The train's design echoed in steam locomotive styling throughout the following years.

After its Worlds Fair display and a nationwide demonstration tour, the Zephyr entered revenue service between Kansas City, Missouri, and Lincoln, Nebraska, on 11 November 1934. A total of nine Zephyr trainsets were built for the Burlington between 1934 and 1939. Each ran as named trains on various Burlington midwestern routes. The Burlington later renamed the Burlington Zephyr as the Pioneer Zephyr in honor of that train's status as the first of the fleet. In April 1935, two Twin Cities Zephyrs that bore the same three-car configuration entered service on the railroad's Chicago and Minneapolis-St. Paul route. Larger trainsets with more powerful Winton engines were built for the Burlington and put into service over longer routes. Twin-engine power units and eventually booster power units met the trainsets' additional power requirements. The Burlington's four-car Mark Twain Zephyr entered revenue service in October 1935 on the railroad's Saint Louis–Burlington, Iowa, route. Two partially articulated six-car trainsets entered service in May 1936 on the Burlington's Denver Zephyr route, which connected Chicago and Denver. The Burlington then replaced those sets with a pair of partially articulated ten-car trainsets in November 1936. The Burlington moved the Denver Zephyr's six-cat sets to the Twin Cities Zephyr, transferring that train's original streamlined cars to other Burlington routes.

The last of the classic Zephyrs was built for the Burlington's Kansas City–Saint Louis General Pershing Zephyr route. That trainset, which contained GM's newest 1,000-horsepower (750 kW) engine and conventional coupling, entered service in June 1939. The Burlington's original Zephyr trainsets remained in service in the postwar era. The railroad retired the last of its six-car sets in 1968 after using it as the Nebraska Zephyr.

On 31 January 1935, the Union Pacific's three-car M-10000 went into service between Kansas City, Missouri, and Salina, Kansas, as The Streamliner. The train subsequently became the City of Salina under the railroad's naming convention for its expanding fleet of diesel-powered streamliners. The Union Pacific operated the M-10000 as a three-car set until the railroad was retired the set in 1941. The trainset's 1942 scrapping provided Duralumin that was recycled for use in war-time military aircraft.

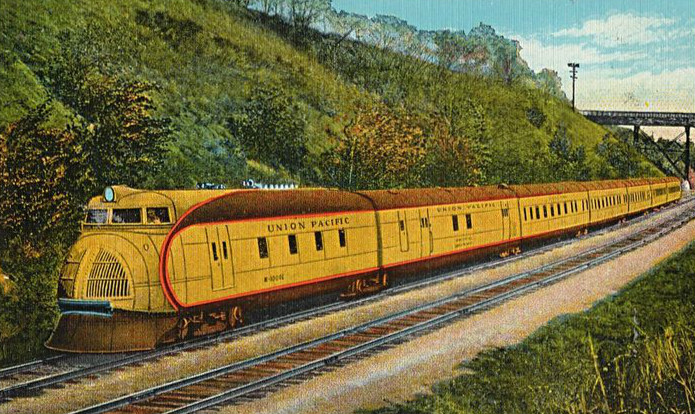
A 1939 colorized postcard depicting the Union Pacific's streamlined M-10001 City of Portland

The Union Pacific also commissioned the construction of five modified trainsets that had evolved from the initial M-10000 design. Those streamlined trains inaugurated the railroad's high-speed service out of Chicago while bearing the names City of Portland (June 1935), City of Los Angeles (May 1936), City of San Francisco (June 1936) and City of Denver (June 1936). The M-10001 set had a single power unit that contained a 1,200-horsepower (890 kW) Winton diesel engine. The power unit pulled six tapered low-profile cars that had the form of the original three-car M-10000 trainset. The M-10002's set consisted of a 1,200-+-900-horsepower (890 + 670 kW) cab/booster locomotive pulling nine cars of the same form. Automotive-styled cab/booster locomotive sets with 1,200-horsepower (890 kW) engines powered the Union Pacific's City of San Francisco and City of Denver sets. The two City of Denver sets started service two cars shorter than the M-10002 and M-10004 sets, with roomier and heavier straight-sided cars.

The Union Pacific's initial streamliner service to the west coast consisted of five runs monthly for each route. The railroad maintained its daily overnight service on the Chicago–Denver run by assigning three locomotive sets for two trains. The railroad then augmented that stable with locomotive equipment taken from other runs. Despite the breakthrough schedule times of the long-distance M-1000x "City" trains, the records of the Union Pacific's fleet reflected the limitations of the locomotives' technology when meeting the demands of long-distance and higher capacity service. The M-10001 ran for only 32 months as the City of Portland before it was replaced, re-entered service on the Portland–Seattle run and retired in June 1939.

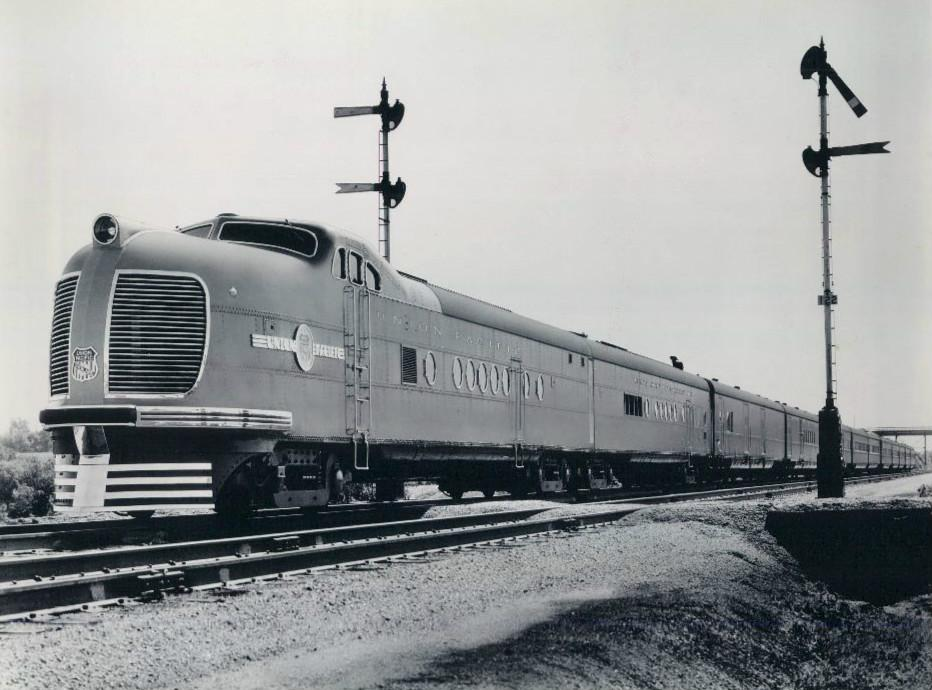
A Union Pacific City of Denver (M-10005 or M-10006), 1940

Similarly, the M-10002 spent 19 months as the Union Pacific's City of Los Angeles, 39 months as the City of Portland and ten months out of service starting in July 1941. The locomotive then served on the Portland–Seattle run until the railroad took it out of service again in March 1943. After running for 18 months as the City of San Francisco M-10004, the locomotive spent six months being refurbished and then served from July 1938 as a second unit on the City of Los Angeles. The Union Pacific retired the locomotive in March 1939. The Union Pacific converted the M-10001 and M-10004 power units to additional boosters for the City of Denver trains. The train's cars then became spare equipment. The two City of Denver trainsets (M–10005 and M–10006), after cannibalizing power from the M-10001 and M-10004, remained in service until 1953.

Class GG1 electric locomotives brought streamlined styling to the Pennsylvania Railroad's fleet of electric locomotives in late 1934. Meanwhile, the Boston and Maine's Flying Yankee, identical to the original Zephyr, entered service between Boston and Portland, Maine, on 1 April 1935.

The Gulf, Mobile and Northern Railroad Rebel trainsets were similar to the Zephyr in form, but were not articulated. Designed by Otto Kuhler, the ALCO powered diesel-electrics that the American Car and Foundry Company constructed were placed into service on 10 July 1935.

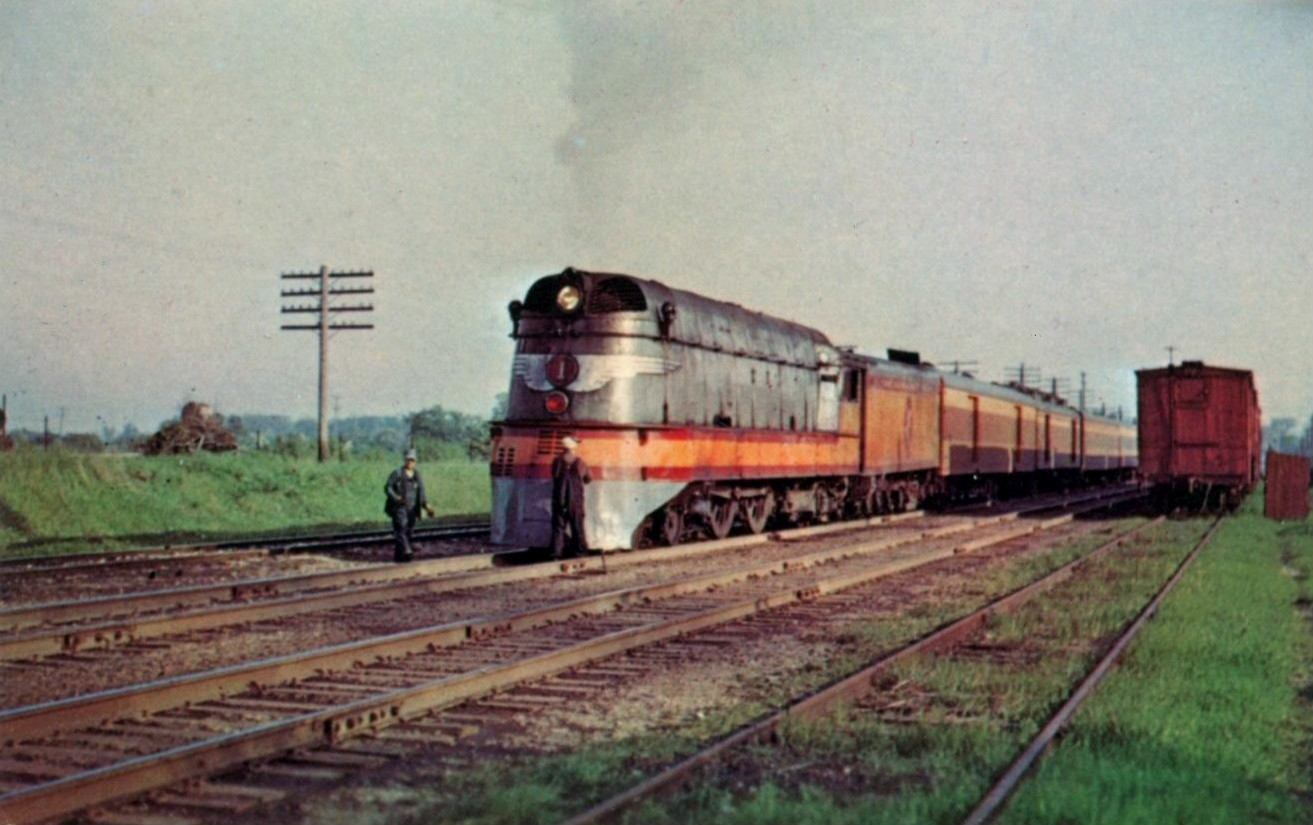
The Milwaukee Road's class A #1 pauses near Milwaukee in 1951.

While streamlining on steam locomotives was more about marketing than performance, newly designed locomotives with state-of-the-art steam technology were able to travel at high speeds. The Milwaukee Road class A Atlantics, built in 1935 to compete with the Twin Cities Zephyr, were the first "steamliners" equipped to back up their styled claim to extra speed. In a 15 May 1935 run by locomotive No. 2 and a dynamometer car, the railroad documented a top speed of 112.5 mph (181.1 km/h). This was the fastest authenticated speed reached by a steam locomotive at the time, making #2 the rail speed record holder for steam and the first steam locomotive to top 110 mph (180 km/h). That record lasted until a German DRG Class 05 locomotive exceeded it the following year.

The Illinois Central 121 trainset was the first of the Green Diamond streamliners running between Chicago and St Louis. It was a five-unit (including power car) articulated trainset for day service. The Pullman-built set had the same power format and 1,200-horsepower (890 kW) Winton diesel engine as M-10001, with some style aspects that resembled the later M1000x trainsets. The Illinois Central ran the 121 trainset on the Green Diamond from May 1936 to 1947. After an overhaul, the railroad placed the set on the Jackson Mississippi–New Orleans run until it retired and scrapped the set in 1950. The visual styling of the new trainsets made the existing fleets of locomotives and railcars suddenly look obsolete. Rail lines soon responded by adding streamlined shrouding and varying degrees of mechanical improvement to older locomotives and re-styling heavyweight cars.

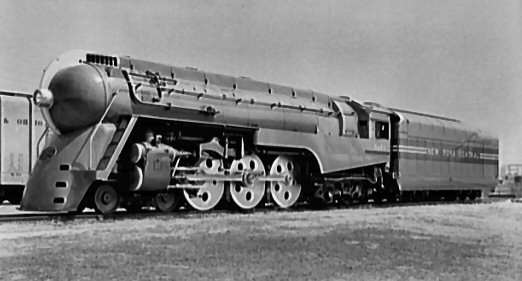
A J-3a Super Hudson on display at the 1939 World's Fair

The first American steam locomotive to receive that treatment was one of the New York Central Railroad's (NYC's) J-1 Hudson class locomotives built in 1930, which was re-introduced with streamlined shrouding and named the Commodore Vanderbilt in December 1934. The Vanderbilt styling was a one-off design by Carl Kantola. The NYC's next venture in streamlined styling was Henry Dreyfuss' 1936 full-length exterior and interior design of the railroad's Mercury trainsets. Raymond Loewy also designed in 1936 art-deco shrouding with a bullet-front scheme for the Pennsylvania Railroad's class K4 locomotives. In 1937, Otto Kuhler used a variation of the bullet-front design on a 4-6-2 locomotive constructed for the Baltimore & Ohio's streamlined Royal Blue. Henry Dreyfuss used a similar variation for the J-3a Super Hudsons that pulled the 20th Century Limited and other NYC express trains.

In 1937, the Milwaukee Road introduced the class F7 Hudsons on the Twin Cities Hiawatha run. The Hudsons could cruise above 110 mph (177 km/h) and were said to exceed 120 mph (193 km/h) on occasion. Otto Kuhler designed the Milwaukee Road's speedsters with "shovel nose" styling. Some of the class 7's details were evocative of those of the Zephyrs.

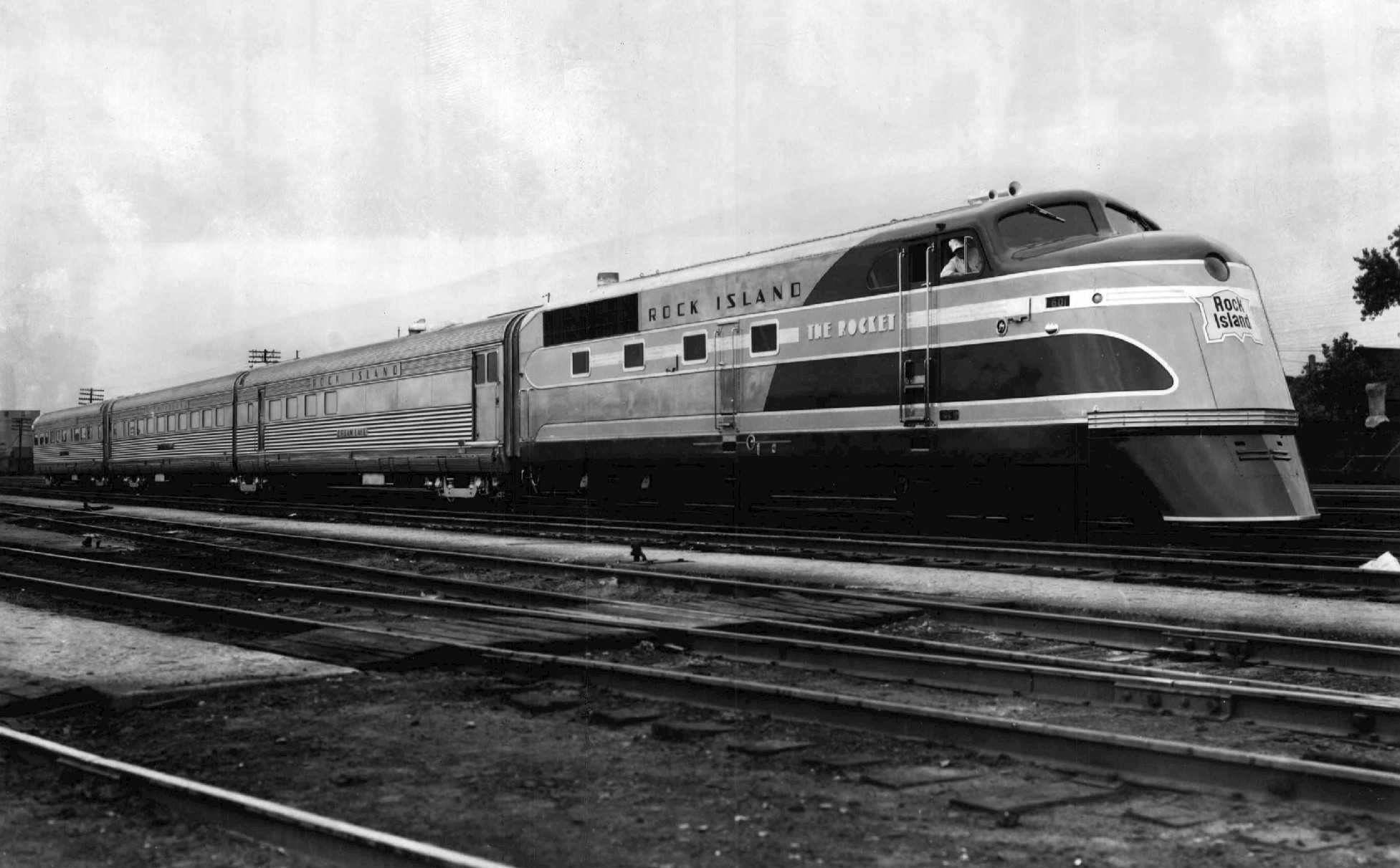
A Rock Island Rocket (1937)

Also in 1937, the Electro-Motive Corporation (EMC)—later incorporated into GM's Electro-Motive Division (EMD)—started production of streamlined diesel-electric passenger locomotives, incorporating the lightweight carbody construction and raked, rounded front end introduced with the Zephyr and the high-mounted, behind-the-nose cab of the M-1000x locomotives. One of the first, EMC's TA, was a 1,200-horsepower (890 kW) version produced for the Rock Island Rockets, a series of six lightweight, semi-articulated three and four-car trainsets. EMC/EMD manufactured streamlined E-unit diesel-electric locomotives from 1937 to 1963. These incorporated two features of the earlier EMC 1800 hp B-B development design locomotives, the twin-engine format and multiple-unit control systems that facilitated cab/booster locomotive sets.

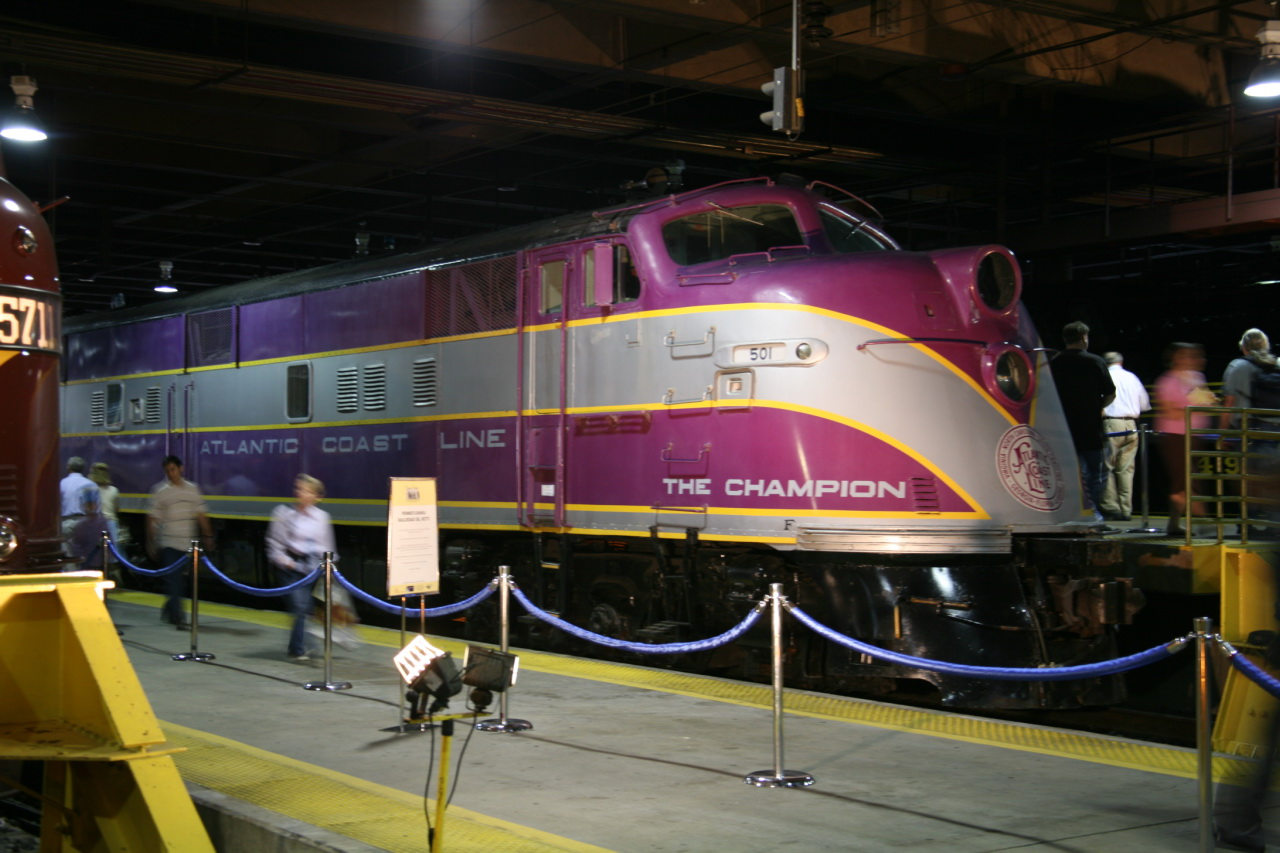
The preserved Atlantic Coast Line Champion EMC E3 on display in the North Carolina Transportation Museum in Spencer, NC, in 2008

The E-units brought sufficient power for full-sized trains such as the B&O Capitol Limited, the Atchison, Topeka and Santa Fe Railway's (AT&SF's) Super Chief, and the Union Pacific's upgraded City of Los Angeles and City of San Francisco, which challenged steam power in all aspects of passenger service. EMC introduced standardized production to the locomotive industry, with its attendant economies of scale and simplified processes for ordering, producing and servicing locomotives. As a result, EMC was able to offer a variety of support services that decreased technological and initial cost barriers that would otherwise deter conversions to diesel-electric power. With power and reliability of new diesel-electric units improved with the 2,000-horsepower (1,500 kW) EMC E3 locomotive in 1938, the advantages of diesel became compelling enough for a growing number of rail lines to select diesel over steam for new passenger equipment. The power and top speed advantages of state-of-the-art steam locomotives were more than offset by diesel's advantages in service flexibility, downtime, maintenance costs and economic efficiency for most operators.

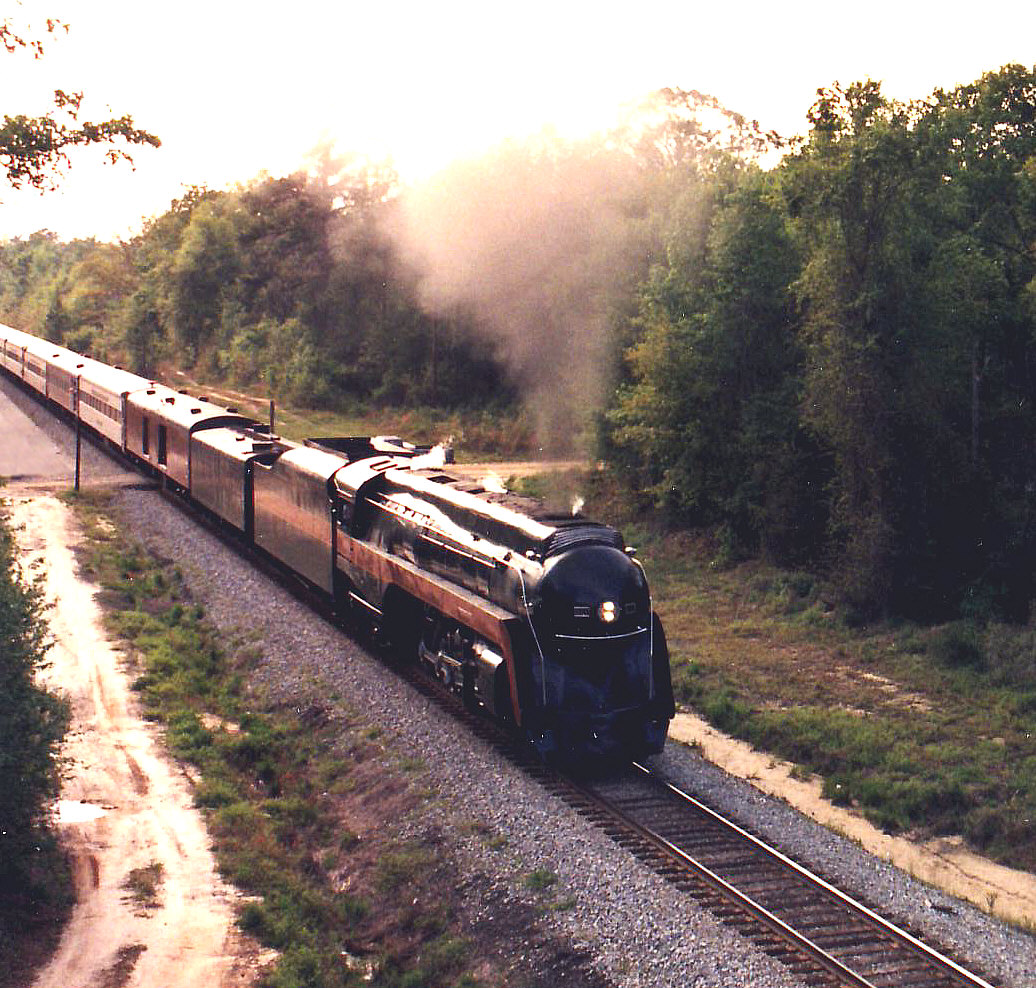
A Norfolk and Western class J streamlined steam locomotive (No. 611) operating in excursion service (1992)

The American Locomotive Company (ALCO), the builder of the Hiawatha speedsters, saw diesel as the future of passenger service and introduced streamlined locomotives influenced by the design of the E units in 1939. The replacement of steam with diesel power was interrupted by the US entry into World War II, with a military premium on diesel technology that stopped all production of diesel locomotives for passenger service between September 1942 and January 1945.

Streamlined steam locomotives continued to be produced into the early postwar era. Among the most distinctive were the Pennsylvania Railroad's duplex-drive 6-4-4-6 type S1 and 4-4-4-4 type T1 locomotives that Raymond Loewy styled. In terms of service longevity, the most successful were the Southern Pacific GS-3 Daylight locomotives introduced in 1938 and the Norfolk and Western class J locomotives introduced in 1941. In contrast to designs that completely encased the boiler in shrouding, streamlining of the GS-3/GS-4 series locomotives consisted of skyline casing flush with the smokestack and smoke-lifting skirting along the boiler that left the silver-painted smokebox on full display.

==== Japan ====
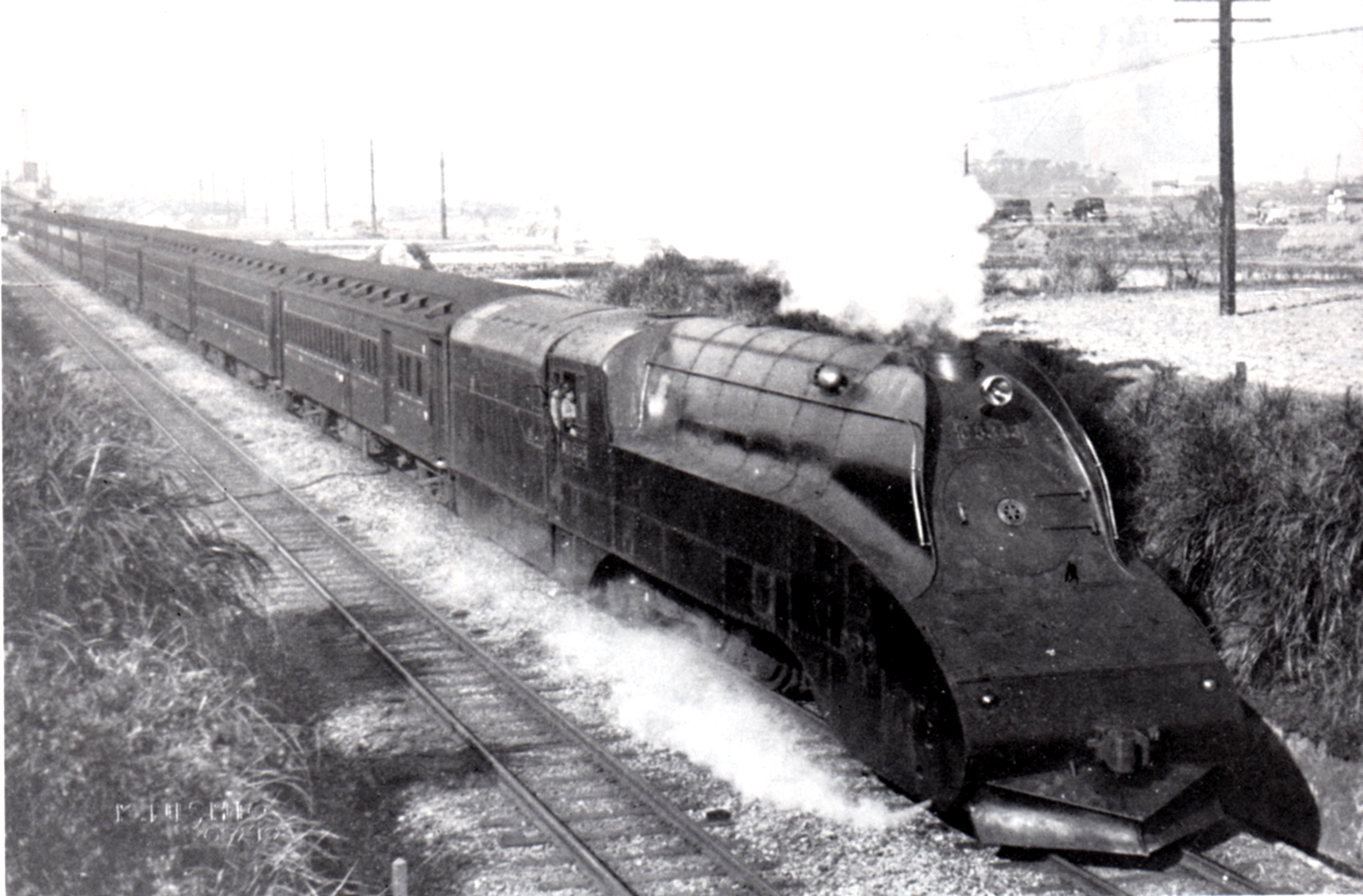
A Japanese Governmental Railways class C53 No. 43 streamlined locomotive in 1934

The trend of streamliners also came to Japan. In 1934, the Ministry of Railways (Japanese Government Railways, JGR) decided to convert one of its 3-cylinder steam locomotives class C53 into a streamlined style. The selected locomotive was No. 43 of class C53. However Hideo Shima, the chief engineer of the conversion, thought streamlining had no practical effect on reducing air resistance, because Japanese trains at that time did not exceed a speed of 62 mph (100 km/h).

Shima therefore designed the locomotive to create airflow that lifted exhaust smoke away from the locomotive. He had expected no practical effect on reducing air resistance completely, therefore he never tried to test fuel consumption or tractive force of the converted locomotive. The Japanese government planned to use this one converted streamline locomotive on the passenger express route between Osaka and Nagoya.

The converted locomotive gained much popularity from the public. JGR therefore decided to build 21 new streamlined versions of the class C55 locomotive. Additionally, JGR built 3 streamlined class EF55 electric locomotives. Kiha-43000 diesel multiple units and Moha-52 electric multiple units also received a streamlined style.

The South Manchuria Railway, which was under Japanese control at that time, also designed the Pashina class streamlined locomotive. The Railway operated the Asia Express, whose style was coordinated with that of Pashina locomotives.

These streamlined steam locomotives took many man-hours to repair due to their casing. After the outbreak of World War II, the lack of an experienced labor force made the problems worse. As a result, many of the locomotives had their casings removed.

=== Australia around World War II ===
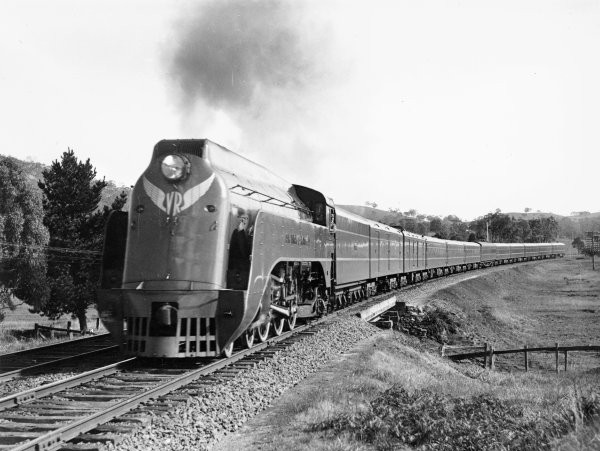
A streamlined S301 in Spirit of Progress service near Kilmore, Victoria, circa 1938

Streamliner locomotives arrived relatively late in Australia. In 1937 streamlined casings were fitted on four Victorian Railways S class locomotives for the Spirit of Progress service between Melbourne and Albury. Similar casings were then fitted on two Tasmanian Government Railways R class narrow-gauge locomotives for the Hobart to Launceston expresses.

Despite — or perhaps because of — the strategic priorities of World War II, some new streamliner locomotives were built in Australia during and immediately after the war. The first five New South Wales C38 class locomotives were modestly streamlined with distinctive conical noses, while the twelve South Australian Railways 520 class locomotives featured extravagant streamlining in the style of the Pennsylvania Railroad's T1.

In all cases, the streamlining on Australian steam locomotives were purely aesthetic, with negligible impacts on train speeds.

=== After World War II ===
==== Europe ====
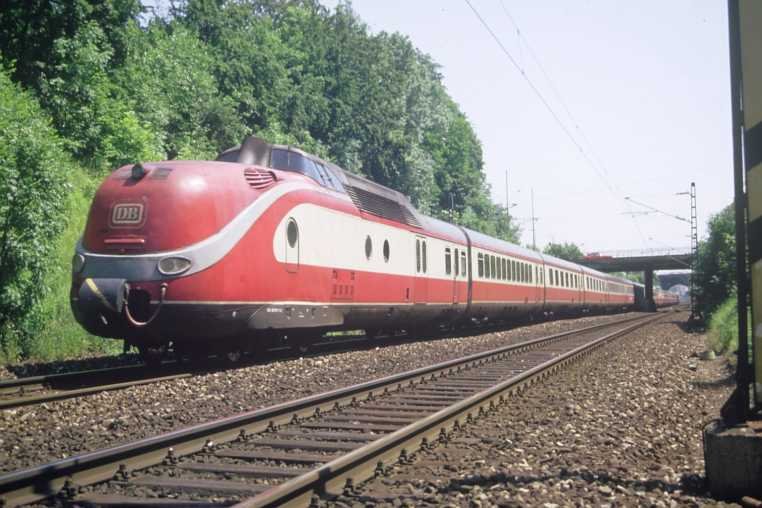
A DB Class 601 ex TEE operating in Munich in 1986

In Europe, the streamliner tradition gained new life after World War II. In Germany, DRG Class SVT 137 trains resumed service, but at slower speeds than before the war. Based on the Kruckenberg SVT 137, the Deutsche Bundesbahn's (DB's) streamlined diesel-electric Class VT 11.5 (later renamed to DB Class 601) built in 1957 was used as the "Trans Europ Express (TEE)" for international high-speed trains.

From 1965, the DB used the streamlined electric locomotives DB Class 103 with regular trains for high-speed service. From 1973, the DB used the DB Class 403, a fully streamlined four-unit electric train with tilting technology. In East Germany, the DR Class VT 18.16 was built for international express service.

The Swiss SBB and the Dutch NS procured five diesel-electric RAm TEE I (Swiss) and NS DE4 (Dutch) trainsets for Zürich-Amsterdam and Amsterdam-Brussels-Paris services. One set was lost in an accident 1971. The remaining four sets operated as TEE trains until 1974, were transferred to Canada for use on the Ontario Northland Railway (ONR) in 1976. The ONR operated three trains on its Toronto–Moosonee line as the Northlander until 1992.

From 1961, the SBB used for TEE service the RAe TEE II, a set of five streamlined electric trains compatible with four different railway electrification systems. Italy used pre-war trains and new trains that the Italian State Railways—Ferrovie dello Stato (FS)—developed. The new trains included the FS Class ETR 250 ("Arlecchino"), the ETR 300 ("Settebello"), the ETR 401 ("Pendolino"), the ETR 450 ("Pendolino") and the ETR 500.

Streamliner service temporarily ended in the United Kingdom with the outbreak of WWII. During the war, the LNER and LMS streamlined locomotives had part of their streamlining removed to aid maintenance. By the late 1940s and early 1950s, the state of the railways was improving as deteriorated track conditions caused by delayed maintenance work were corrected. The repairs and new improvements enabled the railways to provide additional mainline trackage for high-speed trains.

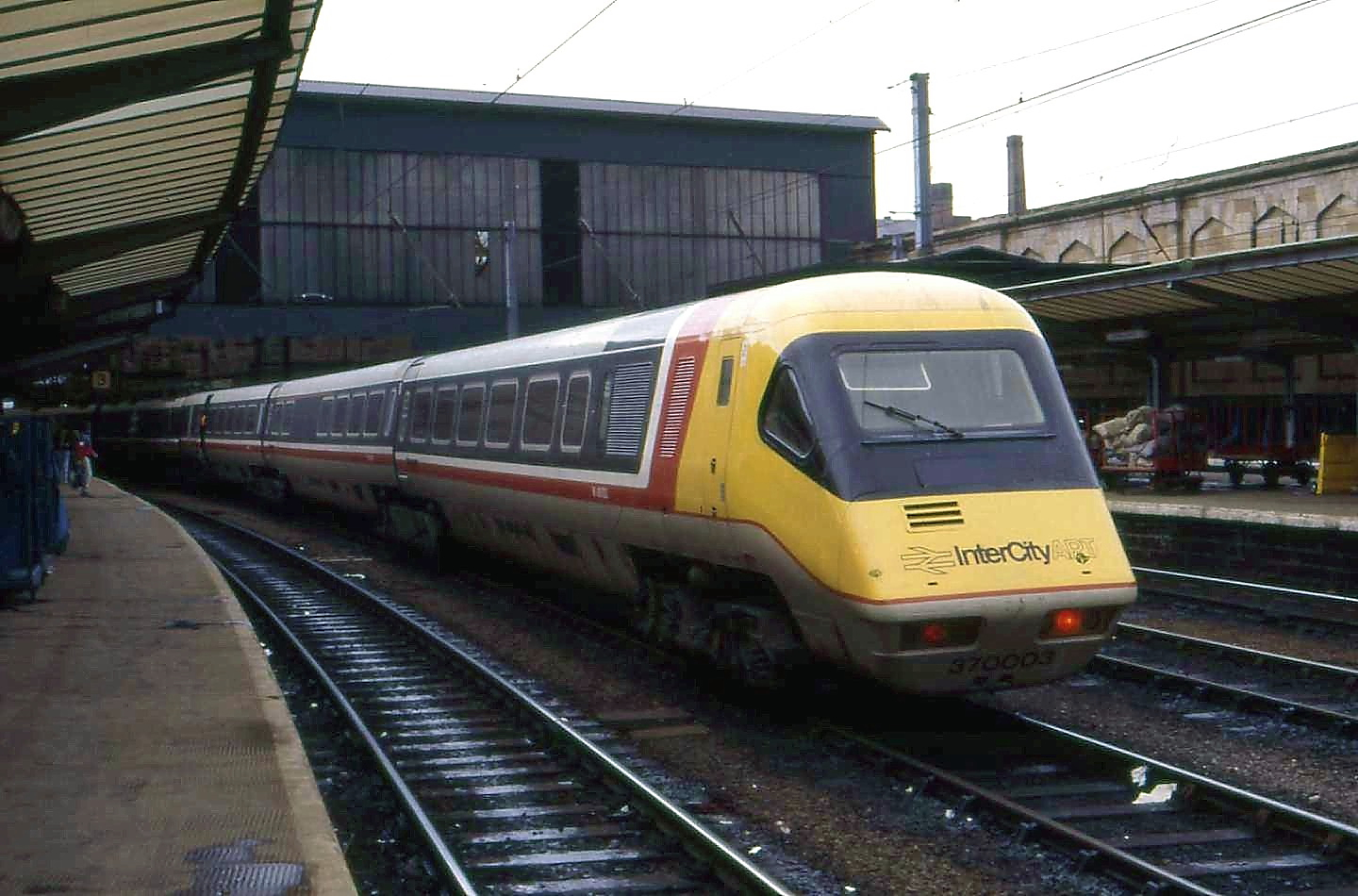
British Rail Class 370 passing Carlisle in 1980

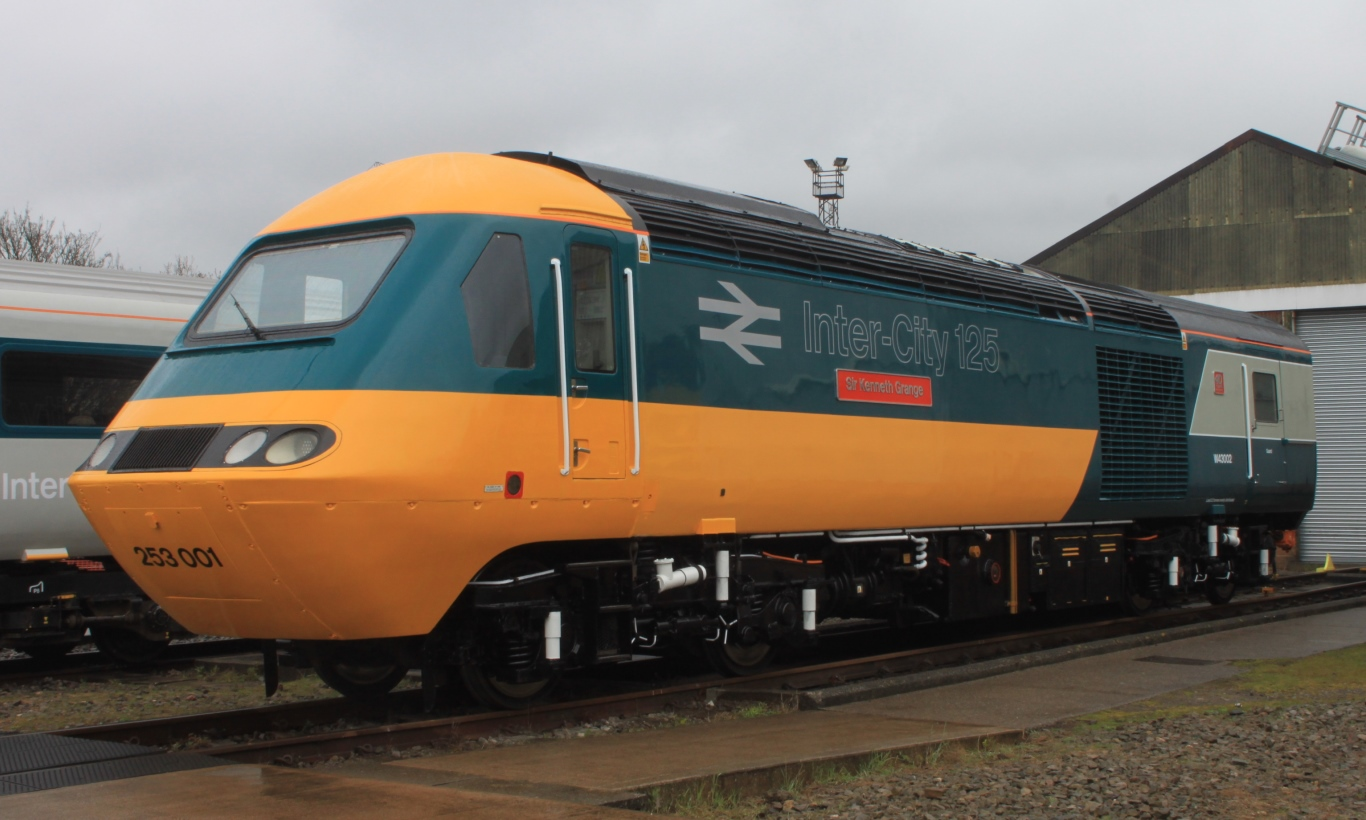
British Rail Class 43 (HST) locomotive in Bristol in 2016

The first experiments with diesel streamliner services in the United Kingdom were the Blue Pullman trains introduced in 1960 and withdrawn in 1973. These provided 90-mile-per-hour (140 km/h) luxury business services, but were marginally successful and ran only a little faster than mainstream services. The Blue Pullman was followed by research into streamlined trains and tilting trains, the first to enter passenger service, in 1976, being the diesel powered InterCity 125 (Class 43), followed by the electric, tilting, British Rail Class 370, and Class 91, in combination offering 125 mph (201 km/h) streamlined train services across the United Kingdom.

High-speed service with the electric German ICE 1 (Class 401) began in 1991. The train, which has traveled at speeds of up to 280 km/h (174 mph) in revenue service, broke the speed record that the first DMU "Flying Hamburger" had set 1933 traveling between Hamburg and Berlin.

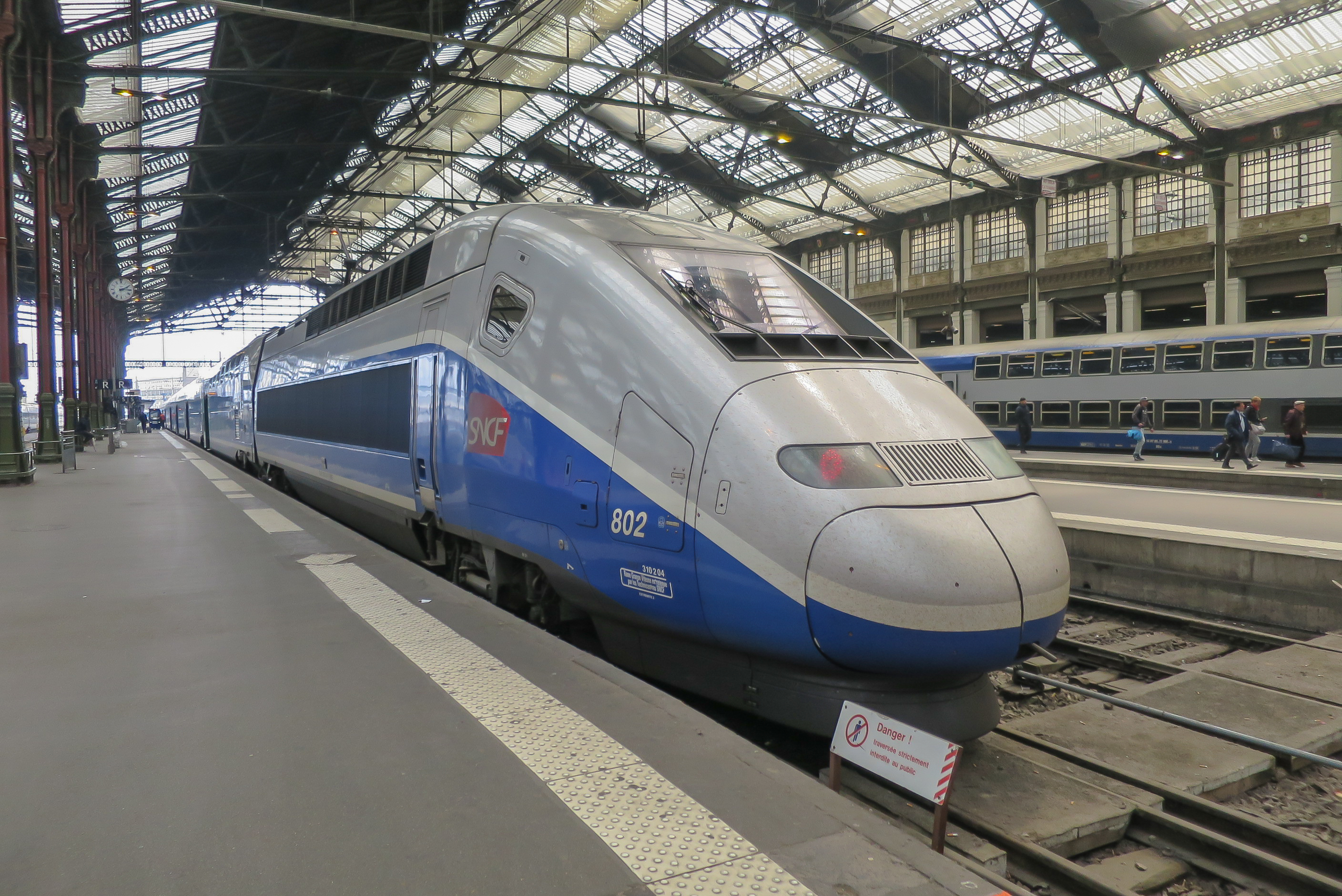
A TGV 2N2 train in the Paris-Gare-de-Lyon in 2018

A french TGV high-speed test train set a world record for the fastest wheeled train, reaching 575 km/h (357 mph) in 2007. Conventional TGV services operate at up to 322 km/h (200 mph) on the LGV Est, LGV Rhin-Rhône and LGV Méditerranée. The power cars of the TGV Euroduplex (2N2), which began commercial operations in 2011, have a more streamlined nose than do previous TGVs.

In 2015, Eurostar began to operate the electric multiple unit (EMU) British Rail Class 374, also known as the Eurostar e320, on its high-speed services through the Channel Tunnel. The train serves destinations beyond Eurostar's core routes to the Gare du Nord station in Paris and the Brussels-South railway station. Owned by Eurostar International Limited and capable of operating at 320 km/h (199 mph), the aluminum trains are sixteen-unit versions of the Siemens Velaro.

==== United States ====
High-speed steam service continued in the United States after World War II, but became increasingly uneconomical. The New York Central's Super Hudsons went out of service in 1948 as the line converted to diesel for passenger service. The Milwaukee Road retired its high speed Hiawatha steam locomotives between 1949 and 1951. The last of the Pennsylvania Railroad's short-lived T1 class locomotives went out of service in 1952. All of those iconic locomotives were scrapped. The last steam streamliners built were three Norfolk and Western class J locomotives in 1950, which operated until 1959.

In 1951, the Interstate Commerce Commission implemented regulations restricting most trains to speeds of 79 mph (127 km/h) or below unless automatic train stop, automatic train control, or cab signalling were installed. The new regulations minimized one of the key advantages of rail travel over the automobile, which became an increasingly attractive alternative as postwar construction of highway systems progressed. Rail operators marketed their services on the basis of luxurious sightseeing, as airlines increasingly competed with rail lines for long-distance travel.

In the mid-1950s, there were several attempts to revive the lightweight custom streamliner concept. None of these projects achieved any lasting impact on passenger service.

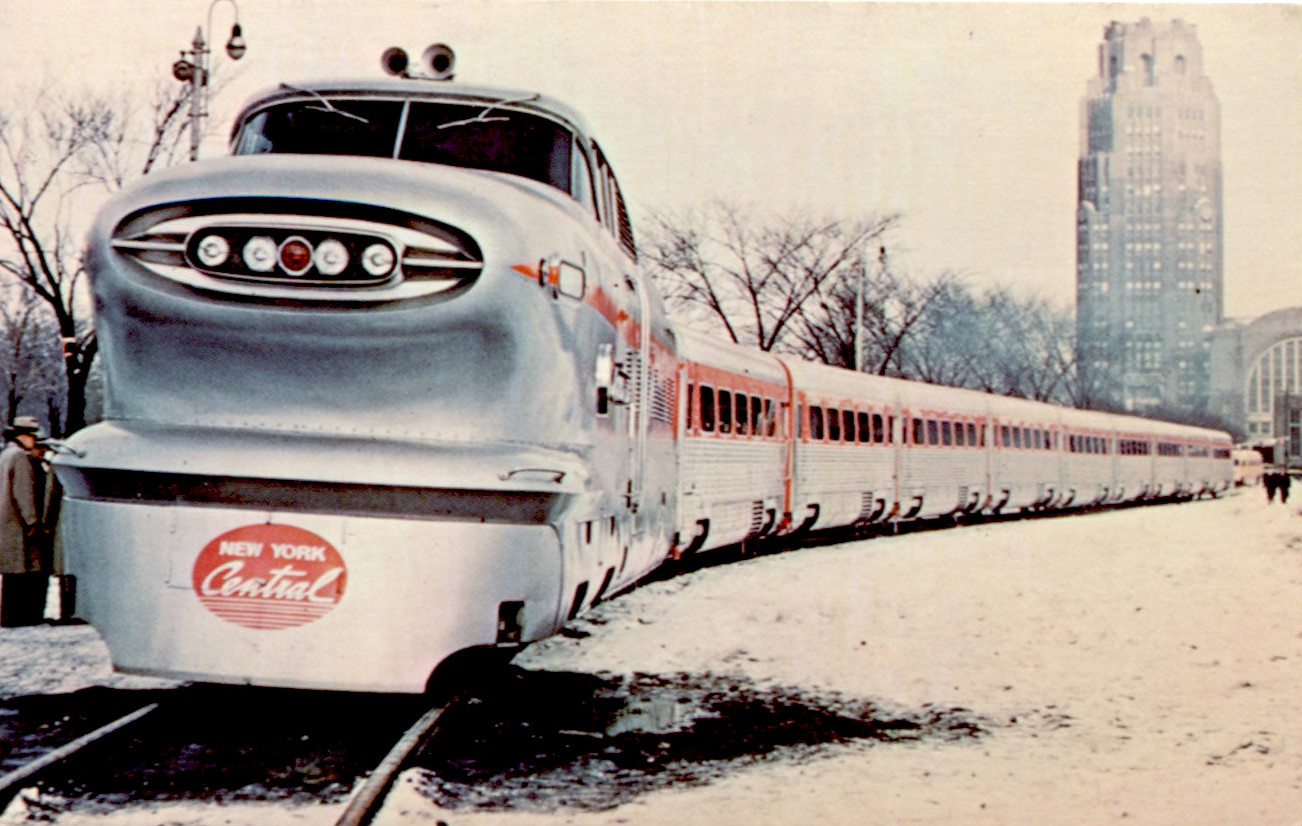
New York Central's Aerotrain at the Buffalo Central Terminal in 1956

The Train X project, first promoted by Robert R. Young no later than 1948, resulted in low-profile Baldwin RP-210 locomotives paired with articulated aluminum cars from Pullman-Standard. Two trainsets were built in 1956 for the New York Central Railroad's Ohio Xplorer and the New York, New Haven and Hartford Railroad's Dan'l Webster. The pair were problematic and were withdrawn from service by 1960.

GM's project, originally called Train Y, was marketed as the Aerotrain. It featured a futuristic, automotive-styled EMD LWT12 diesel–electric locomotive pulling aluminum coaches adapted from GM's long-distance bus design. Two trainsets were produced in 1955 and were trialed by several railroads, but no orders were forthcoming. The two demonstration units were eventually sold to the Rock Island Line, which was already operating an EMD LWT12 paired with Talgo II cars from ACF Industries as the Jet Rocket. Rock Island operated them in commuter service until 1966.

The Speed Merchant project also produced only two examples. They consisted of Fairbanks-Morse P-12-42 locomotives paired with Talgo II cars from ACF Industries, and were used by the Boston and Maine Railroad for commuter service and by the New York, New Haven and Hartford Railroad's John Quincy Adams. Both were retired by 1964.

In 1956, the Budd Company produced a single streamlined, lightweight, six car DMU trainset that the New York, New Haven and Hartford Railroad operated as the Roger Williams. After a short period of time in high speed service, the train was split up and the cars were used in service with the New Haven's other RDCs.

The advent of jet air travel in the late 1950s brought forth a new round of price competition from airlines for long-distance travel, severely affecting the ridership and profitability of long-distance passenger rail service. Government regulations forced railroads to continue to operate passenger rail service, even on long routes where, the railroads argued, it was almost impossible to make a profit.

Unlike air and automotive infrastructure, which federal and state governments subsidize, operating revenues entirely support privately owned rail infrastructure in the United States. By the late 1960s, most rail operators were therefore seeking to completely discontinue passenger service.

The lightweight custom streamliner concept was revived again in the 1960s with the UAC TurboTrain. These articulated trainsets used gas turbine engines instead of reciprocating diesel engines for traction power. They were operated by Penn Central and then Amtrak from 1969 to 1976, and in Canada by Canadian National and then Via Rail from 1969 to 1982.

Some GG1 electric locomotives that the Pennsylvania Railroad once operated remained in service until 1983. The last EMD E-units in regular service were retired in 1993.

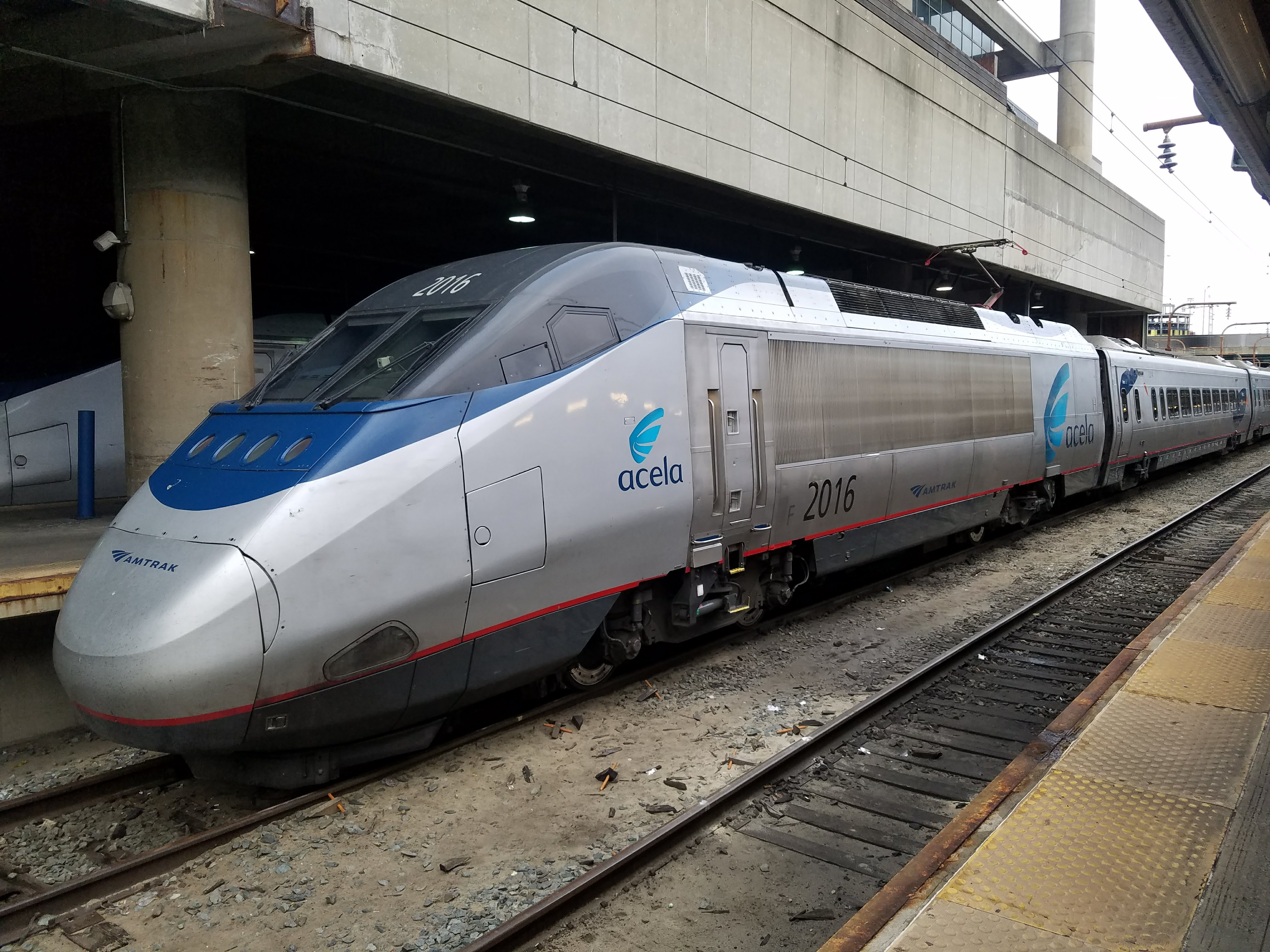
An Amtrak Acela Express at Washington, D.C.'s Union Station in 2018

Amtrak has operated nearly all long-distance passenger rail systems in the United States since 1971. The publicly-financed rail company's quest for greater fuel efficiency has led them to acquire and operate GE Genesis diesel-electric locomotives. In so doing, Amtrak reintroduced the lightweight, aerodynamic carbody construction that the Zephyr had pioneered in the 1930s.

Since 2000, Amtrak has operated high-speed Acela (named Acela Express until 2019) passenger trains that travel at speeds of up to 150 mph (240 km/h) in the Boston - Washington, D.C. Northeast Corridor. State governments and others in many areas throughout the United States have considered the construction of new high-speed lines, but rail travel is much less common in the U.S. than in Europe or Japan.

In 2008, California voters approved bonds to initiate construction of the California High-Speed Rail line, which would connect the San Francisco Bay Area, the Central Valley and Southern California. Construction of the first segment, between Bakersfield and Merced in the Central Valley, began in 2015.

==== Preserved examples (United States) ====
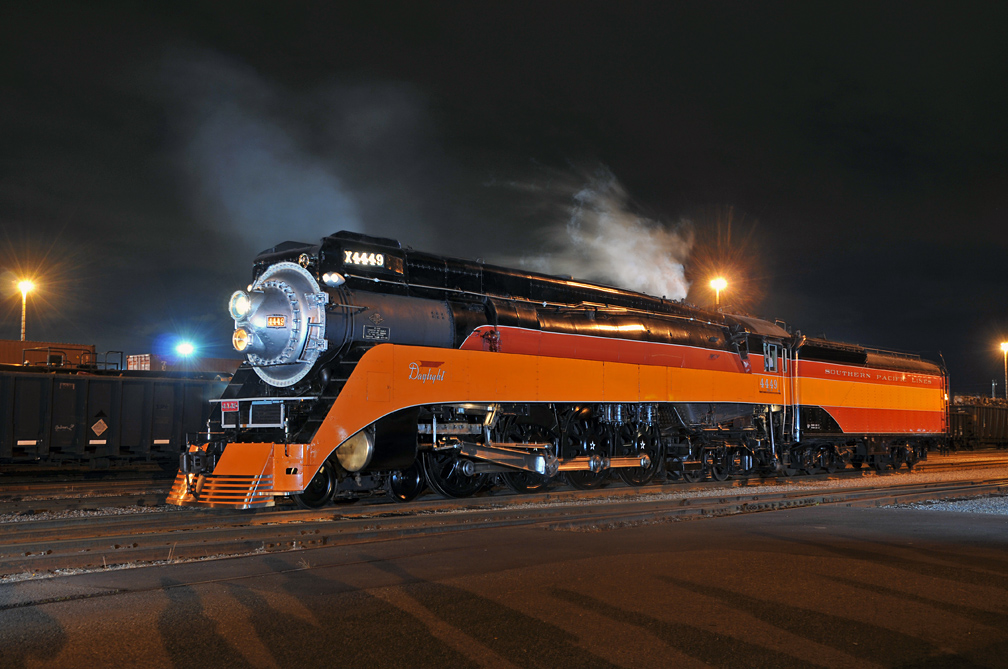
The restored Southern Pacific class GS-4 No. 4449 (Daylight) operating in Tacoma, Washington, in June 2011

After 26 years of service and traveling over 3,000,000 miles (4,800,000 km), the Pioneer Zephyr went to Chicago's Museum of Science and Industry. The Flying Yankee, the third streamliner to enter service, is undergoing restoration to operational condition. The Silver Charger locomotive of the General Pershing Zephyr trainset remained in service until 1966 and is also undergoing restoration.

In December 1974, the streamlined steam-powered Southern Pacific 4449 "Daylight" came off an outdoor public display to undergo a restoration and re-painting that enabled it pull the American Freedom Train, which toured the 48 contiguous United States as part of the nation's 1976 Bicentennial celebration. With the exception of occasional interruptions for maintenance and inspections, the restored locomotive has operated in excursion service throughout that area since 1984.

The twice-restored streamlined Norfolk and Western 611 operated in mainline excursion service within the United States from 1982 to 1994 and from 2015 to 2017. The locomotive has traveled for display at special events.

Examples of the pre-World War II "slant nose" EMC EA, E3, E5, and E6 locomotives are on display at the Baltimore and Ohio Railroad Museum, the North Carolina Transportation Museum, the Illinois Railway Museum, and the Kentucky Railway Museum. The stainless steel clad E5 is occasionally matched with one of the original Denver Zephyr car sets for excursion service. As of 2017, the Rock Island No. 630 E6 unit was under restoration for display in Iowa.

The EMD LWT12 locomotives and several passenger cars of GM's two Aerotrains are presently on display within the United States. The National Railroad Museum in Green Bay, Wisconsin now exhibits the Chicago, Rock Island and Pacific Railroad's Aerotrain locomotive No. 2 and two passenger cars. The National Museum of Transportation in Kirkwood, Missouri (near St. Louis) exhibits the Rock Island's locomotive No. 3 and two passenger cars.

==== Japan ====
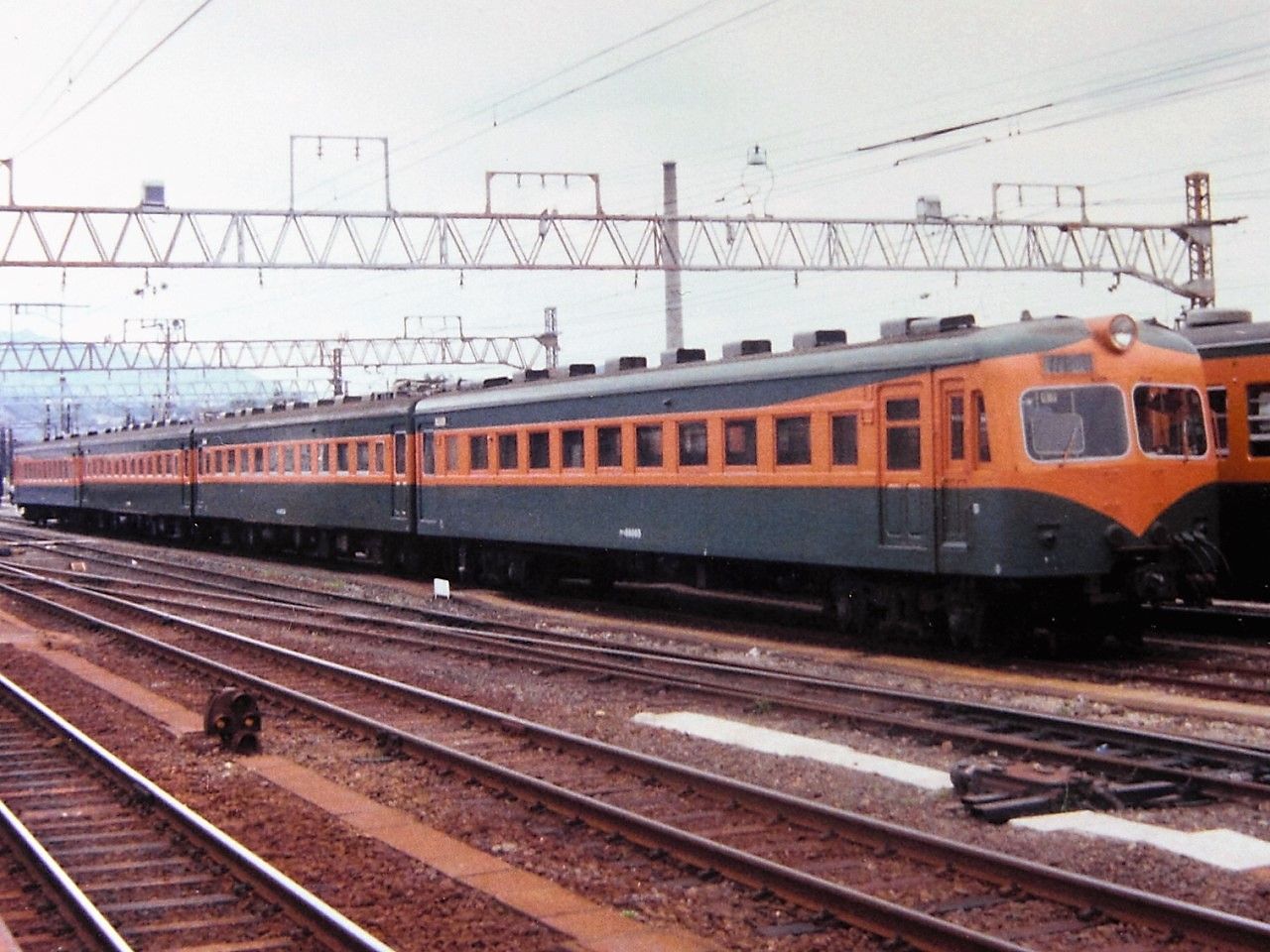
A JNR 80-0 series train at the Nakatsugawa station on the Chūō Main Line in 1979

After World War II, Japanese railroads favored multiple unit trains, even on their mainlines. In 1949, the Japanese National Railways (JNR) released the 80 series EMUs for use on long-distance trains. Lead coaches of the 80 series built after 1950 incorporated a streamlined design.

In 1957, Odakyu Electric Railway released the 3000 series EMUs. The exterior design was developed using a wind tunnel intended for aircraft.

An Odakyu 3000 set a world railway speed record of 145 km/h (90 mph) for a narrow-gauge train. Multiple unit trains were thus shown to be suitable for long-distance trains by the JNR Series 80 and for high-speed trains by the Odakyu 3000.

These experiences led to the development of the first Shinkansen, the 0 Series. The Odakyu 3000 strongly influenced the 0 series, which was also developed using a wind tunnel.

The lead coaches of the 0 series were developed using a Douglas DC-8 for a reference. At a speed of 193 km/h (120 mph), the aerodynamic style of the 0 series "bullet train" had a substantial effect on reducing air resistance.

In 2020, the Central Japan Railway Company (JR Central) began operating the N700S, the most recent addition to the N700 Series Shinkansen. The 16-car train reached its design speed of 362 km/h (225 mph) in trials conducted in 2019 on the Tokaido Shinkansen.

A JR Central L0 series five-car maglev train operating on the Yamanashi Test Track in 2013

The JR Central is presently developing and testing the L0 series high-speed maglev train. The JR Central plans to use the streamlined train on the Chūō Shinkansen railway line between Tokyo and Nagoya, which is under construction. The railroad expects to open the line in 2027 and to later extend it to Osaka.

A seven-car L0 series train set a world railway speed record of 602 km/h (374 mph) in 2015. The railway plans to operate the train at a maximum speed of 310 mph (500 km/h) when in revenue service. The train's speed would exceed that of the world's fastest commercial electric train, the Chinese Shanghai maglev, whose cruising speed is 431 km/h (268 mph).

=== High speed train services today ===
Worldwide many, if not most, high speed passenger trains are now streamlined. Speeds continue to rise as high-speed rail services become the normal long-distance rail service.

=== Streetcars and high-speed interurbans ===
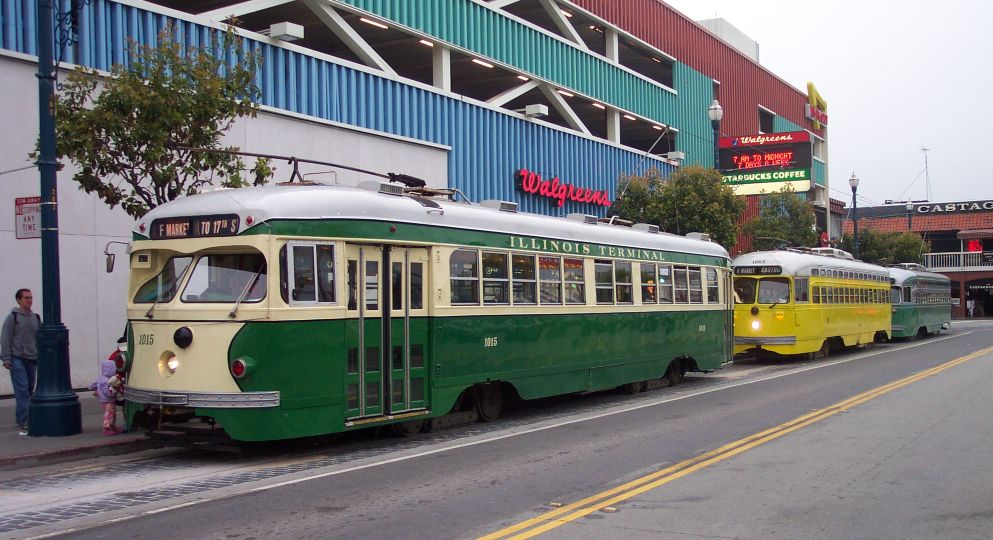
Three historic PCC streetcars on San Francisco's F Market & Wharves electric trolley line in 2003

Early versions of the PCC (Presidents’ Conference Committee) streetcars were referred to as Streamliners in North America. However, aerodynamic research appeared much earlier on the interurban scene, i.e. among the forerunners of the recent light rail. In 1905, the Electric Railway Test Commission started a series of test runs to develop a carbody design that would reduce wind resistance at high speeds.

Vestibule sections of different shapes were suspended independent of the carbody, with a dynamometer to measure the resistance of each. Over 200 test runs were made at speeds up to 70 mph (113 km/h) with parabolic, wedge, standard, and flat vestibule ends.

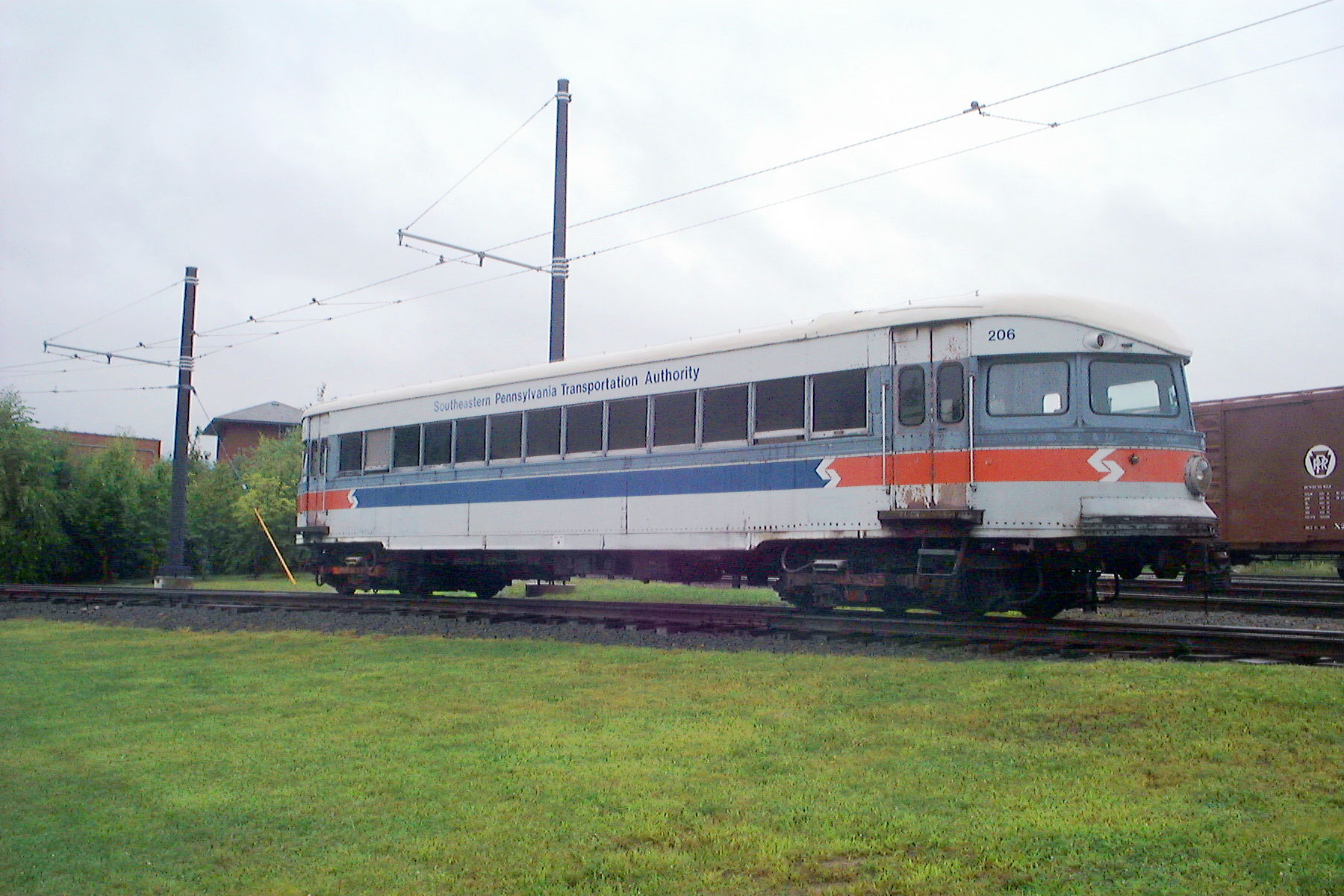
A late model Brill Bullet from the Philadelphia & Western Railway on display at the Electric City Trolley Museum in Scranton, Pennsylvania, in 2003

The test results indicated that a parabolic-shaped front end reduced wind resistance at high speeds below that of the conventional rounded profile. However, with that time's heavy railcars and moderate speeds, no significant operating economies were realized. Streamlining was discarded for another quarter-century.

From the 1920s, however, stronger alloys, lightweight metals, and better design were all used to reduce carbody weight—which in turn permitted the use of smaller bogies and motors with corresponding economies in power consumption. In 1922, the G. C. Kuhlman Car Company built ten lightweight cars for the Western Ohio Railway.

After an elaborate wind tunnel investigation, the first in the railway industry, the J. G. Brill Company made in 1931 its first Bullet railcars, capable to speeds above 90 mph (140 km/h). With 52 seats, they weighed only 26 tons. Some remained in use for almost 60 years.

== Buses ==
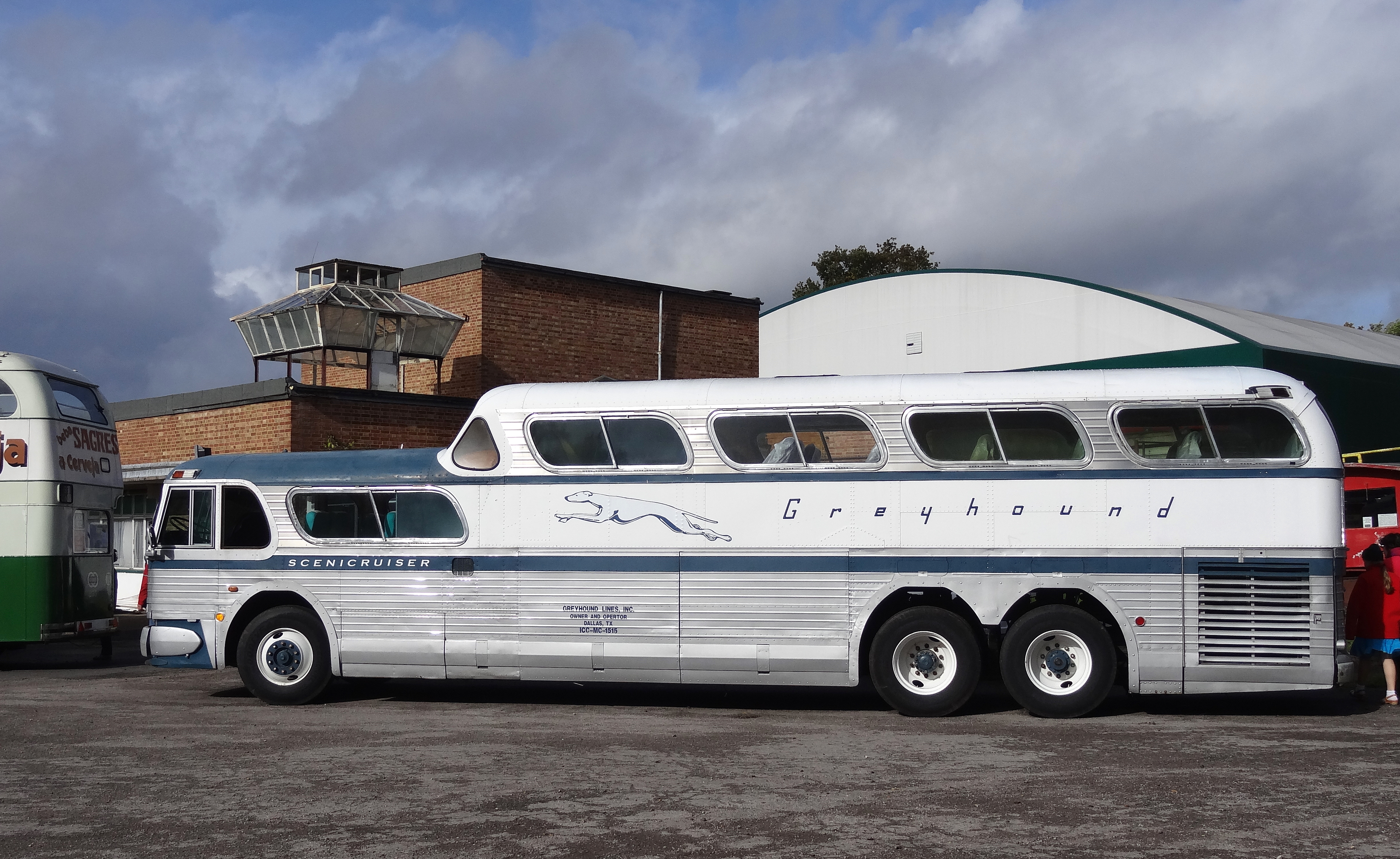
A preserved Greyhound Scenicruiser on display in the London Bus Museum in 2013

Many buses adopted a stylish streamline look in the 1930s with tests showing that streamlined design reduced fuel costs.

Starting in 1934, Greyhound Lines worked with the Yellow Coach Manufacturing Company for its Series 700 buses, first for Series 719 prototypes in 1934, and from 1937 as the exclusive customer for Yellow's Series 743 buses. Greyhound named these the "Super Coach" and purchased a total of 1,256 between 1937 and 1939.

General Motors also custom-built twelve streamlined Futurliners for its 1936 Parade of Progress and, later the 1939 New York World's Fair and traveling exhibits. The popular two-level GMC PD-4501 Scenicruiser, which GM manufactured for Greyhound Lines between 1954 and 1956, exemplified the further streamlining that occurred in the company's bus designs in the years that followed World War II.

== Automobiles ==
Beginning in 1899, engineers tried to incorporate aerodynamics into the shape of automobiles. Some such cars entered production.

=== Experimental and prototype vehicles ===
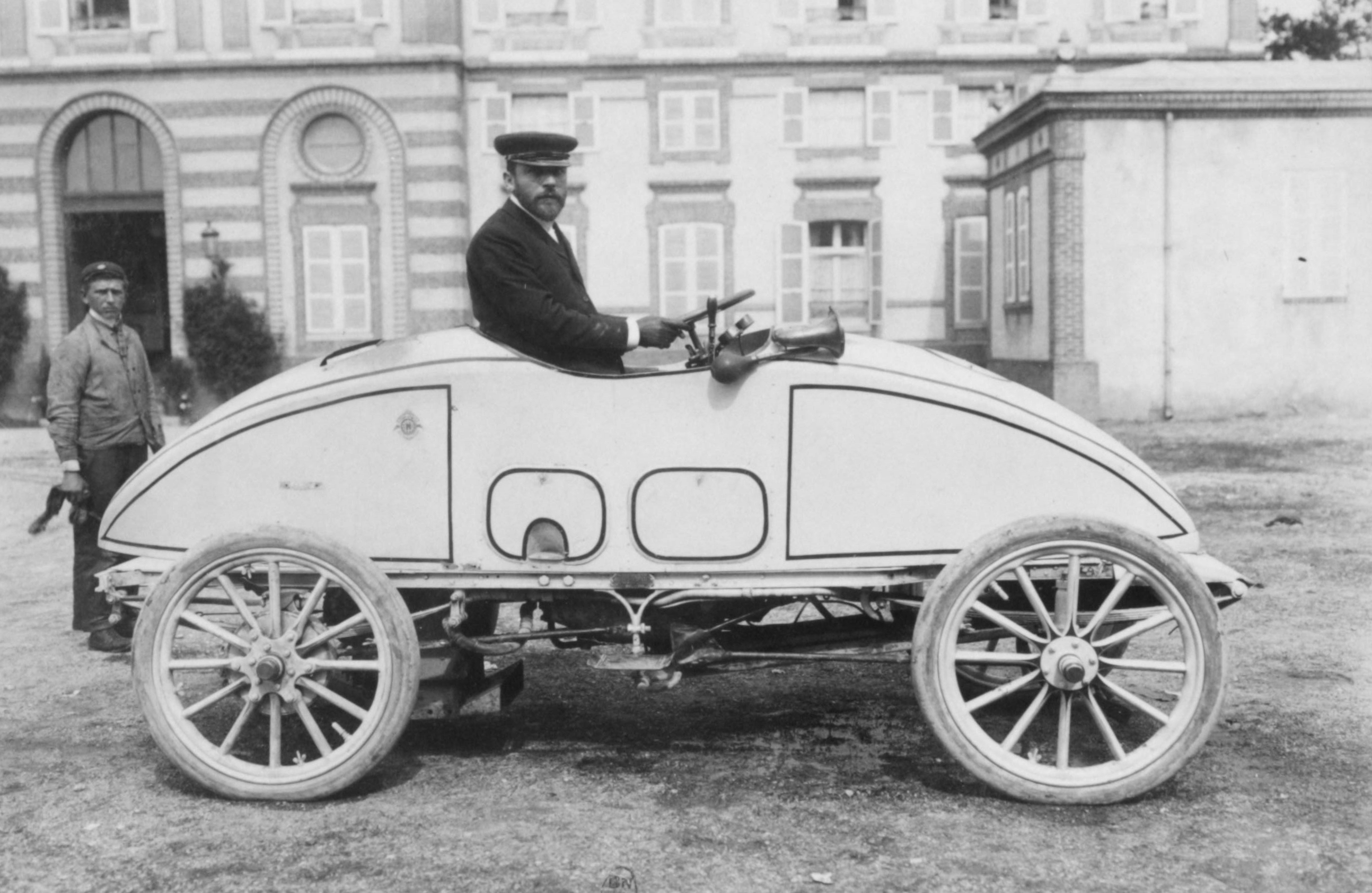
Léon Serpollet in his Œuf de Pâques at Deauville, 26 August 1902

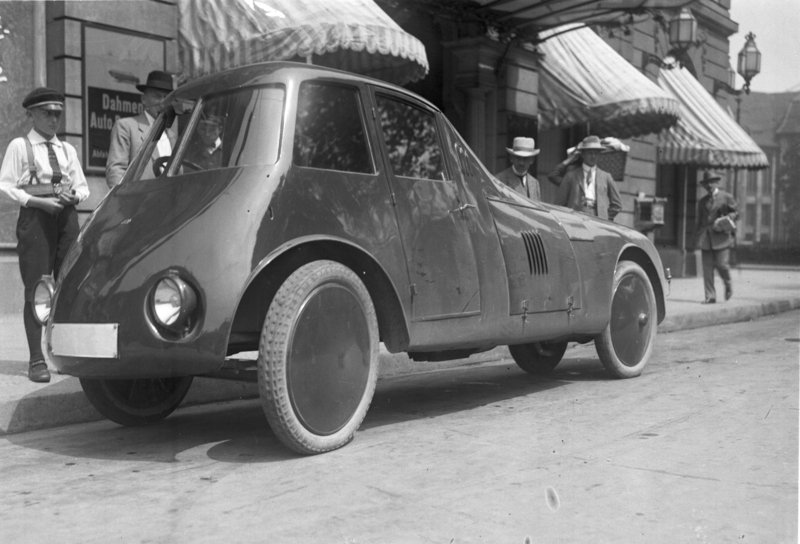
Streamlined car constructed by Aurel Perșu, Berlin, 1923

Chronologically:

- Camille Jenatzy's La Jamais Contente (1899)
- Léon Serpollet's Œuf de Pâques (1902)
- ALFA 40/60 HP Aerodinamica Prototype by Castagna (1914)
- Persu car (1922–23), designed by Romanian engineer Aurel Persu, who improved on the Tropfenwagen by placing the wheels inside the car body
- Burney car (1929-1931), working prototypes designed by Dennis Burney and manufactured by Streamline Cars
- Dymaxion (1933–1934), U.S. "teardrop" car
- Stout Scarab (1932–35, 1946), aerodynamic US car
- Porsche Type 12 prototype (1934), the model for the 1938 Volkswagen Beetle
- Schlörwagen (1939), German prototype aerodynamic car, never produced

=== Production vehicles ===
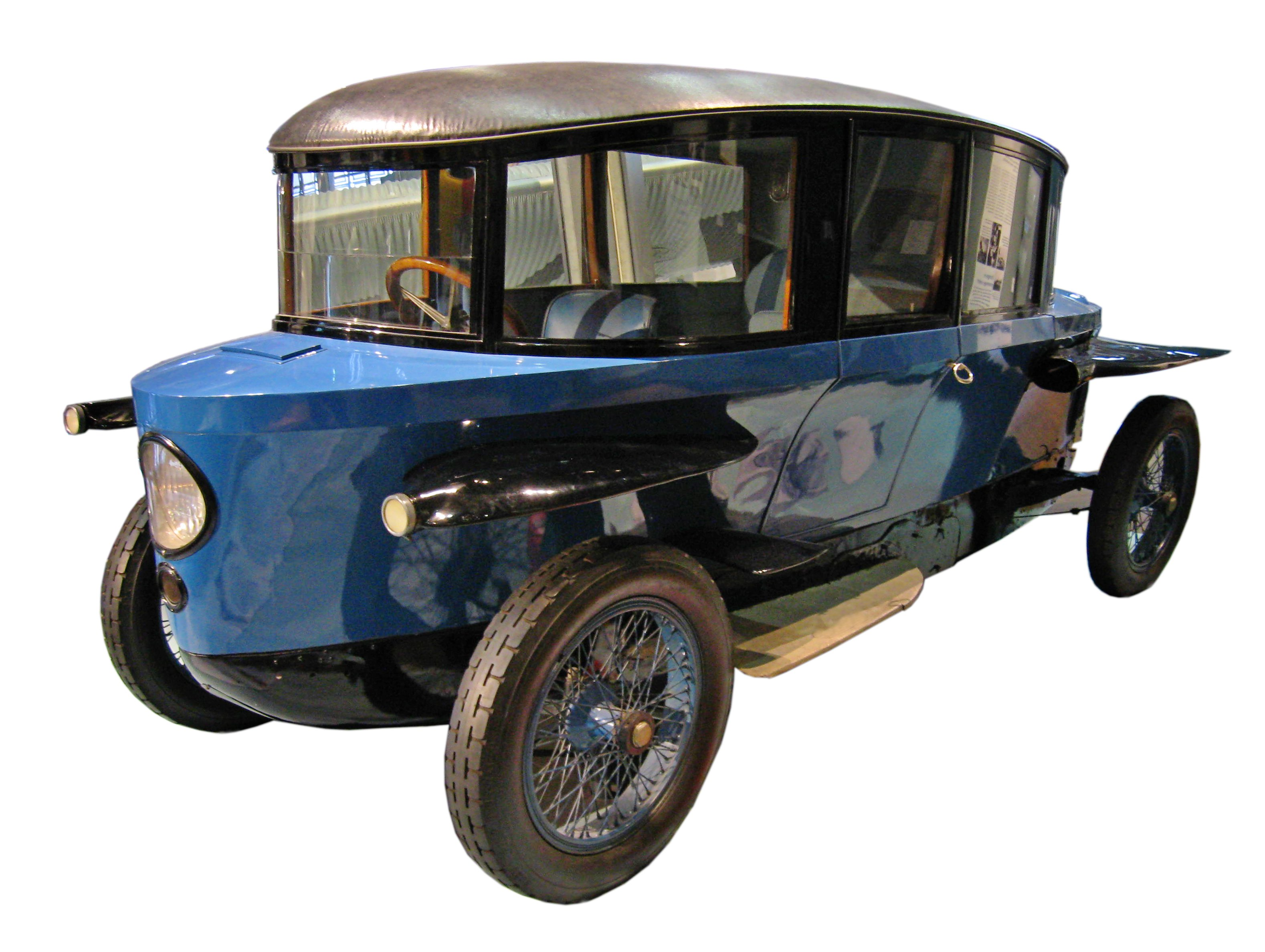
Rumpler Tropfenwagen1, Berlin Technikmuseum

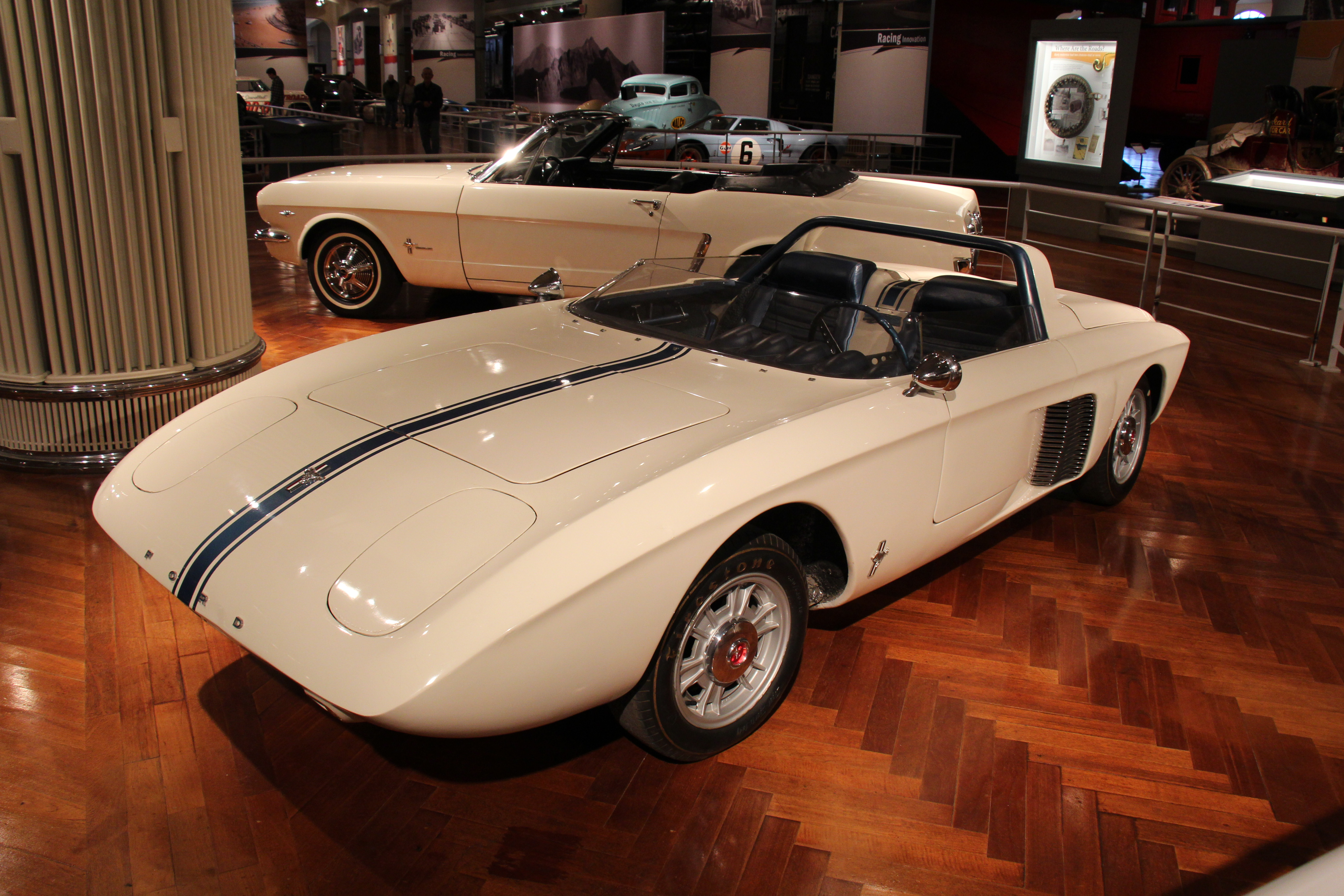
The 1962 Ford Mustang I concept car at the Henry Ford Museum in Dearborn, Michigan (2014)

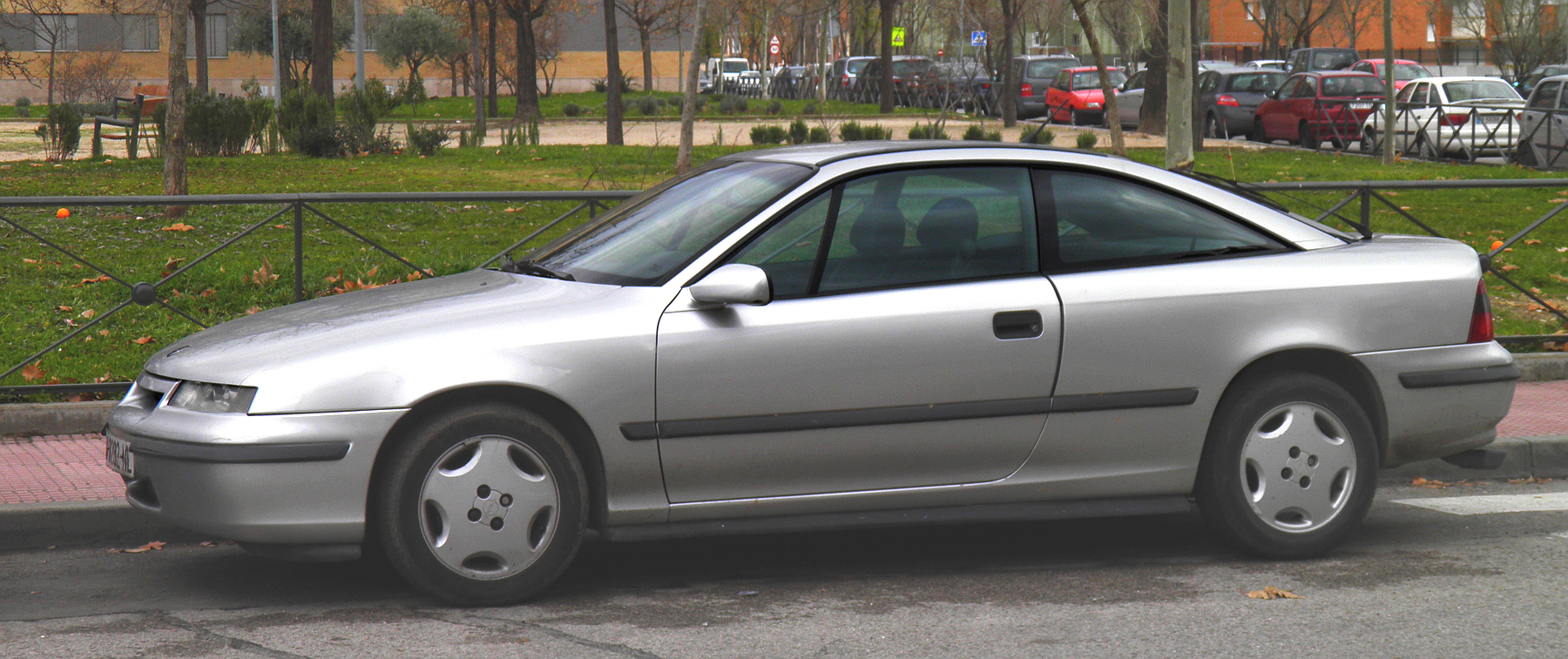
Opel Calibra with 0.26 Cd

Many production automobiles have had streamlined bodies. Among these were, chronologically by first production year:

- Rumpler Tropfenwagen (1921), first aerodynamic "teardrop" car to be designed and serially produced (about 100 units built, already wind tunnel optimized)
- Pontiac Economy Eight Series 601 (1933)
- Pierce Silver Arrow (1933)
- Tatra 77 (1934), first serial-produced and truly aerodynamic optimized automobile after the Tropfenwagen
- Chrysler Airflow (1934) streamlined car
- Steyr 100 (1934) was presented to the public at the latest in January 1934, just like the Chrysler Airflow.
- Citroën Traction Avant (1934)
- Toyota AA (1935)
- Buick Roadmaster (1936)
- Lincoln-Zephyr (1936)
- Volkswagen Beetle (1938)
- International Harvester Metro Van (1938)
- Pontiac Torpedo (1940)
- Hudson Commodore (1941)
- Tucker 48 (1947), also known as Tucker Torpedo
- Saab 92 (1949)
- Cadillac Eldorado (1952)
- Chevrolet Corvette (1953)
- Citroen DS (1955)
- Edsel Citation (1958)
- Mercedes-Benz W111 (1959)
- Audi 100 (1982)
- Opel Calibra (1989)
- General Motors EV1 (1996)
- Honda Insight (1999)
- Volkswagen XL1 (2015)
- Hyundai Ioniq 6 (2022)

=== Record-setting streamlined racing cars ===
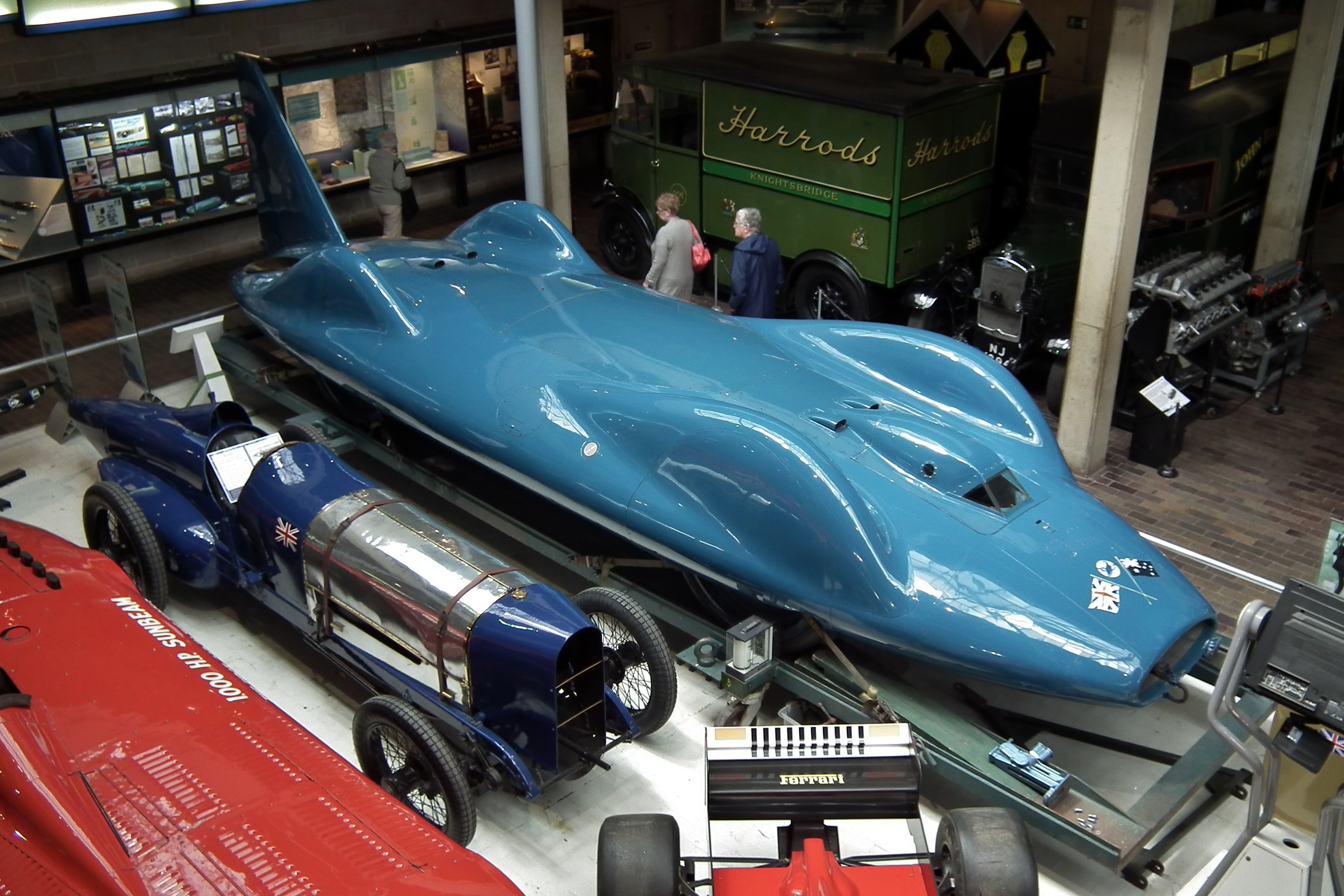
The streamlined 1960 Bluebird-Proteus CN7 racing car on display at the National Motor Museum in Beaulieu, Hampshire, England (2011)

Racing cars setting world land speed records have extensive streamlining. These include:

==== Electric ====
- White Lightning: Electric-powered vehicle land speed record of 396 km/h (246 mph) (1999)
- Buckeye Bullet 3: Electric-powered vehicle land speed record of 549 km/h (341 mph) (2016)

==== Fuel cell ====
- Buckeye Bullet 2: Hydrogen fuel cell-powered vehicle land speed record of 460 km/h (286 mph) (2008)

==== Internal combustion ====
- Bluebird-Proteus CN7: Wheel-driven land speed record of 649 km/h (403 mph) (1964)
- Goldenrod: Wheel-driven land speed record of 658 km/h (409 mph) (1965)
- Spirit of Rett: Wheel-driven land speed record of 666 km/h (414 mph) (2010)
- Speed Demon: Wheel-driven land speed record of 707 km/h (439 mph) (2012)
- JCB Dieselmax: Diesel-powered land speed record of 563 km/h (350 mph) (2006)

==== Rocket and jet ====
- Blue Flame (rocket): Land speed record of 1,001 km/h (622 mph) (1970)
- Thrust SSC (jet): Land speed record of 1,228 km/h (763 mph) (1997)

== Trucks ==
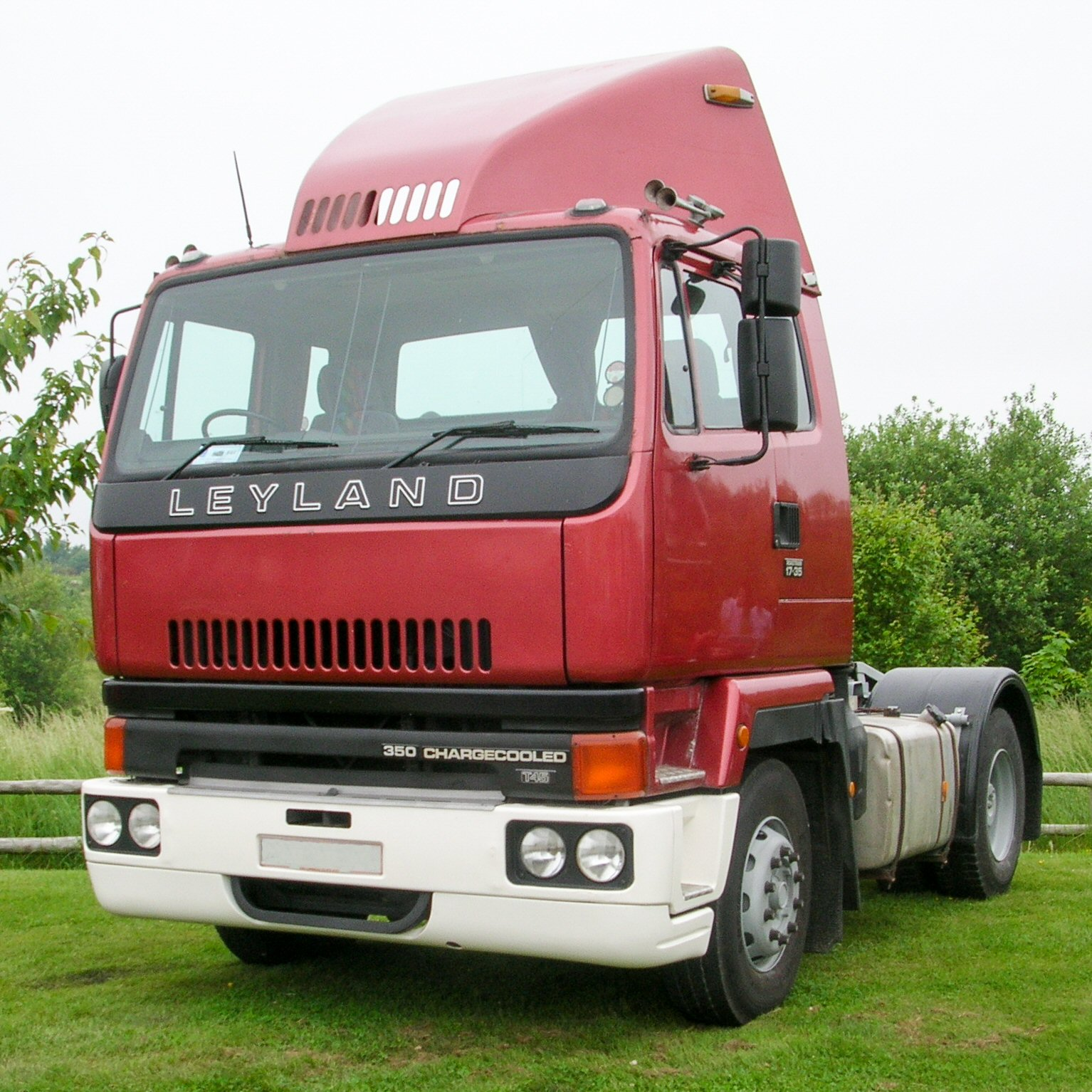
A streamlined 1988 Leyland T45 Roadtrain cab-over tractor unit for a semi-trailer truck (2007)

Many small trucks and tractor units for pulling semi-trailer trucks have streamlining to improve aerodynamics.

== Trailers ==
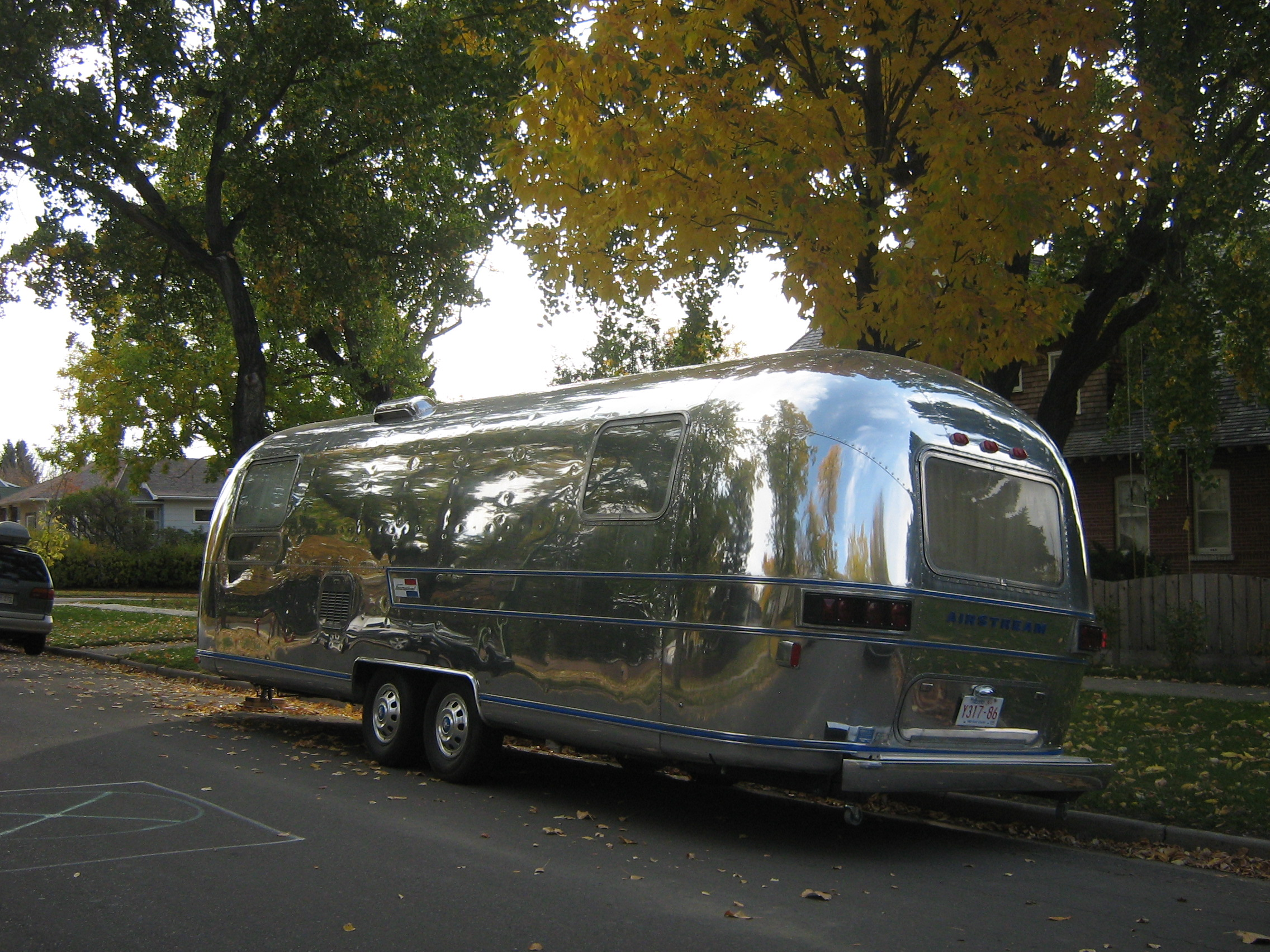
A four-wheel Airstream caravan trailer (2006)

Camping (caravan) and animal trailer manufacturers use streamlining to make trailers easier to tow. Current and past manufacturers include Airstream, Avalon, Avion, Boles Aero, Bonair Oxygen, Curtis Wright, Knaus Tabbert, Silver Streak, Spartan, Streamline, and Vagabond.

== Motorcycles ==
=== Land-speed records ===
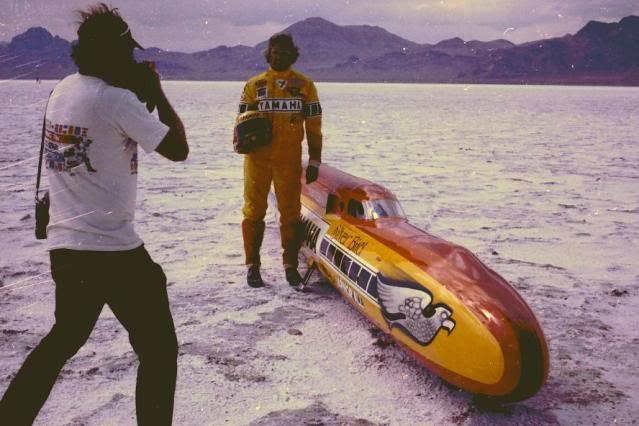
Don Vesco with his Silver Bird streamliner at the Bonneville Salt Flats race track west of Wendover, Utah

Streamlined motorcycles setting land-speed records include:

- NSU Delphin I: 1951
- NSU Delphin III: 340 km/h (210 mph) (1956)
- Gyronaut X-1: 396 km/h (246 mph) (1966)
- Munro Special: 296 km/h (184.087 mph) (1967)
- Big Red: 407 km/h (253 mph) (1970)
- Silver Bird: 489 km/h (304 mph) (1975)
- Lightning Bolt: 513 km/h (319 mph) (1978)
- BUB Seven Streamliner: held record from 2006 to 2008 and again from 2009 to 2010
- Ack Attack: 605 km/h (376 mph) (2010)

=== Energy efficiency ===
Streamlined motorcycles designed to reduce energy usage include:

- Vetter Streamliner
- Craig Vetter Fuel Economy Challenge
- Ecomobile, Swiss cabin motorcycle

== Bicycles and tricycles ==
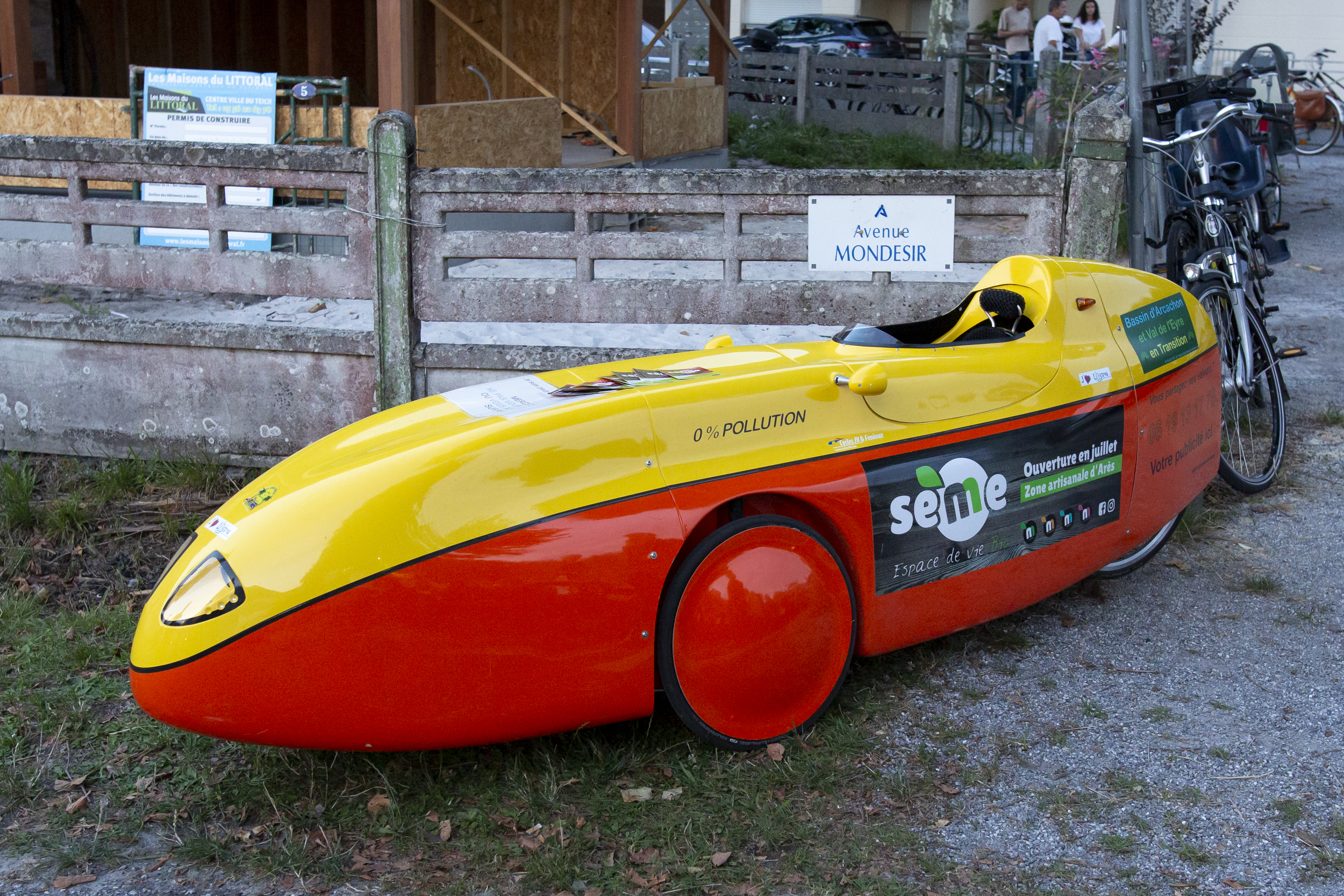
A partially enclosed three-wheeled velomobile (2018)

Bicycle fairings help to streamline the vehicle and the rider. Human powered upright and recumbent bicycles and tricycles termed velomobiles that are partially or completely enclosed for aerodynamic advantage and weather protection take streamlining even further. Although many velomobiles are recreational, two-wheeled velomobiles have set a number of cycling speed records.

== Ships ==
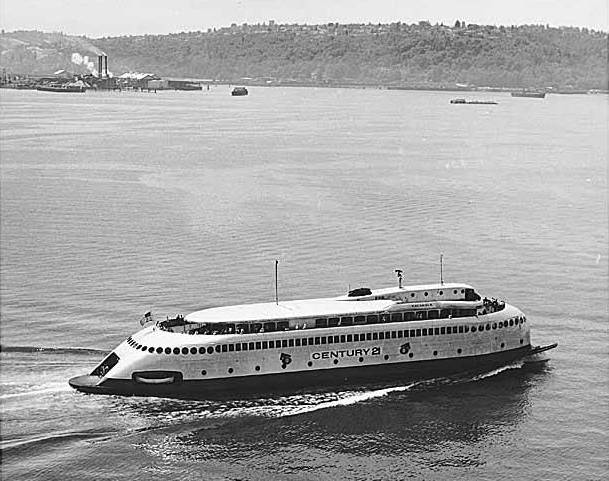
The MV Kalakala ferry in 1962

The Streamline Moderne–style automobile/passenger ferry MV Kalakala received its streamlining during a 1933–1935 reconstruction. The ship operated in Puget Sound near the northwestern coast of the U.S. state of Washington until 1967. It was scrapped in 2015.

== Sterling Streamliner diners ==
Many American roadside diners built since the 1930s have had streamlined exteriors and interiors. In 1939, Roland Stickney designed a diner named the Sterling Streamliner. Built by the John B. Judkins Company, a firm that also made custom car bodies, the prefabricated diner's production ceased in 1942 at the beginning of American involvement in World War II.

The rounded shapes of one or both ends of the Sterling Streamliner diners resembled the sloping curved nose of the Burlington Zephyr's streamlined silver locomotive. One such Sterling Streamliner with two rounded ends was built in 1940 and installed as the Jimmy Evans Flyer in New Bedford, Massachusetts. In the 1960s, the building was moved to the village of Pocasset in the town of Bourne, Massachusetts, on Cape Cod, where it was named the My Tin Diner.

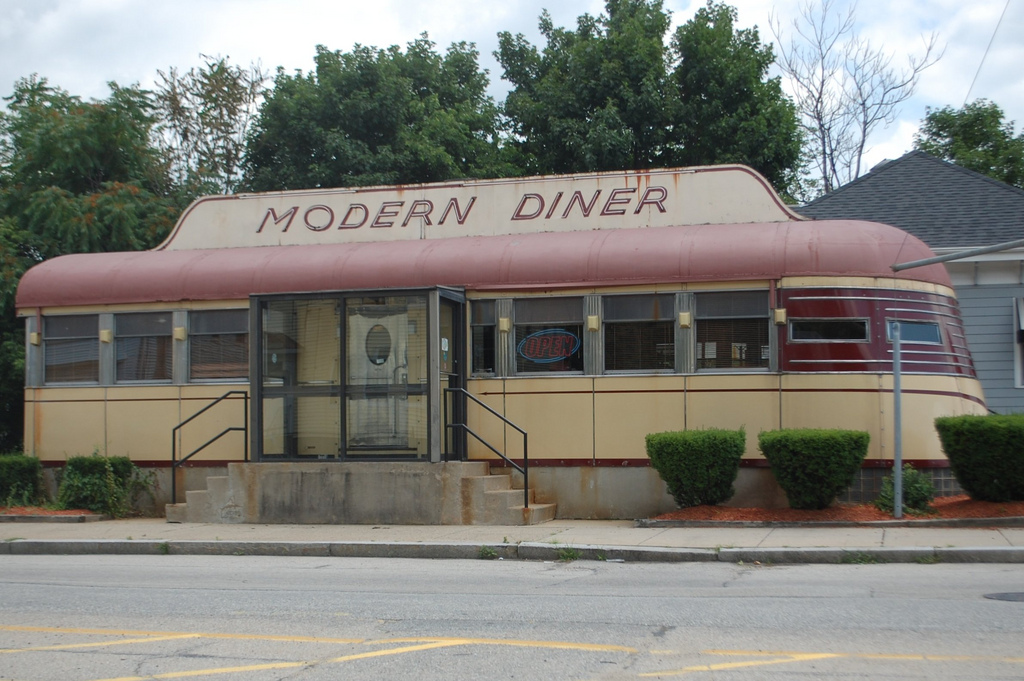
The Modern Diner in May 2010

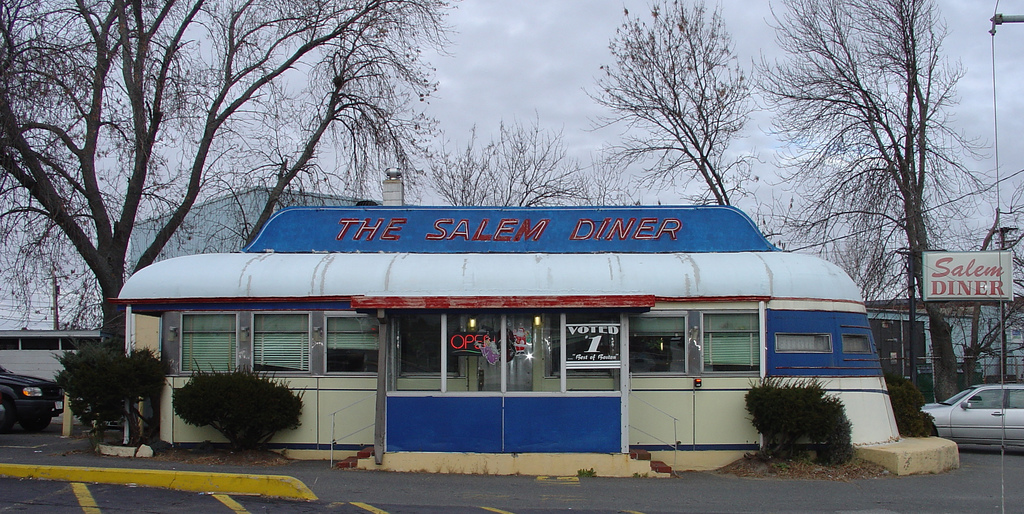
Salem Diner, in Massachusetts

In 2000, an arsonist severely damaged the My Tin Diner when he set it on fire. In 2003, the structure was moved into a field next to the Handy Hill Creamery near Hix Bridge Road in Westport, Massachusetts, while plans were being made to restore it to working condition. However, although restoration began, it was not completed. Visible from the Road, the derelict structure was the only Sterling Streamliner with two rounded ends known to still survive in 2019.

Only one Sterling Streamliner was open for business in 2020: the Modern Diner in Pawtucket, Rhode Island. That structure, which was placed on the National Register of Historic Places in 1978, has both a rounded sloped end and a flat vertical end. Although the building's roof was once silver, it is now maroon.
