= JCB Hydromax =

Streamliner car

Body and chassis
- Class: Land speed record vehicle (hydrogen)
- Body style: Long
- Layout: Dual-engine, 4-wheel drive
- Platform: Steel lattice chassis

Powertrain
- Engine: Two JCB hydrogen engines with turbochargers and intercoolers
- Transmission: Forward transmission and final drive connected to forward engine; rear transmission and final drive unit connected to rear engine

Dimensions
- Length: 32 ft (9.8 m)
- Curb weight: ~2.6 t (2.9 short tons)

The JCB Hydromax is a streamliner car designed for the purpose of breaking the land speed record for a hydrogen-engined vehicle.

The car was built for JCB, a British multinational equipment company. As of 2026, the car holds the world hydrogen-powered land speed record, having been driven to 406.320 miles per hour (653.909 km/h) by Andy Green. Prior to the FIA record attempt, the car set a new record at Bonneville Speed Week of 592.797 km/h (368.347 mph) in the AA/BGS class.

== Design ==
The car is powered by two specially-tuned versions of JCB's production hydrogen internal combustion engine, each featuring four cylinders and 4.8 L (290 cu in) of displacement, accompanied by single-stage turbochargers. The dual engines are mounted on their sides in the chassis with one driving the front wheels while the other drives the rear. Each generates around 600 kW (800 bhp), more than ten times the 56 kW (75 bhp) rated output of the production unit.

The coefficient of drag is claimed to be 10% lower than for the Dieselmax predecessor. The fuel tank, is located directly behind the carbon fibre cockpit. The fully laden weight of the vehicle, including fuel, oil, ice, water coolant and the driver, is slightly less than 2,700 kg (6,000 lb).

Engineering consultancy Prodrive helped develop the chassis, with engine development undertaken by Sussex-based Ricardo.

The vehicle was fitted with custom-made tyres to allow higher speed running. The original Dieselmax car used Goodyear 23×15 racing tyres, with larger tyres rejected to allow for a smaller frontal area but limiting the target speeds to 350mph for safety reasons.

During the 2026 Bonneville Speed Week and subsequent FIA record runs, the car was driven by Andy Green, a retired RAF Officer who also holds the absolute land speed record with ThrustSSC.

== Background ==
In 2006, JCB set a new diesel land speed record of 563.418 km/h (350.092 mph) in their JCB Dieselmax car. The record attempt was in part a marketing effort to showcase the new JCB444 engine. JCB had only recently begun manufacturing engines themselves, having previously used power units from other manufacturers in their machinery.

Dieselmax did not run at its full potential. Difficulties finding suitable tyres led to a self-imposed safety limit of 350mph, and a transmission issue meant the record speed was achieved while the car was still in fifth gear (the car had six).

In 2016, Lord Bamford expressed regret that the record had not been beaten and indicated that a fresh attempt could be made if the JCB record was broken.

In 2021 JCB unveiled a hydrogen-fuelled internal combustion engine derived from their diesel units. The engine received EU approval in 2025 and the first products using the engine came to market in 2026. JCB chose this year - the 20th anniversary of the Dieselmax record - to pursue a record for a hydrogen-powered vehicle.

The existing FIA record for a hydrogen-powered car was 301.95 km/h (187.62 mph), set by the BMW H2R in 2004. The H2R differed in using cryogenic liquid hydrogen where Hydromax ran on compressed gaseous hydrogen.

== Performance ==
Hydromax began testing on 16 June 2026 on the runway at RAF Wittering, achieving a speed of 335 km/h (208 mph) by the end of testing.

The Hydromax max made its first official run on the Bonneville Salt Flats as part of Speed Week, eventually attaining an average speed of 592.797 km/h (368.347 mph) to take the SCTA-BNI (Southern California Timing Association and Bonneville Nationals Inc.) event record for an 'AA/BGS' Blown Gas Streamliner on Thursday 6th August.. Following Speed Week, JCB remained at Bonneville to pursue an FIA World Record in excess of 640 km/h (400 mph).

On 11 August 2026, the JCB Hydromax car broke the official FIA land speed record for a hydrogen powered vehicle, attaining a speed of 406.320 miles per hour (653.909 km/h).

== See also ==
- List of vehicle speed records
- JCB Dieselmax
