= JCB Dieselmax =

Streamliner car

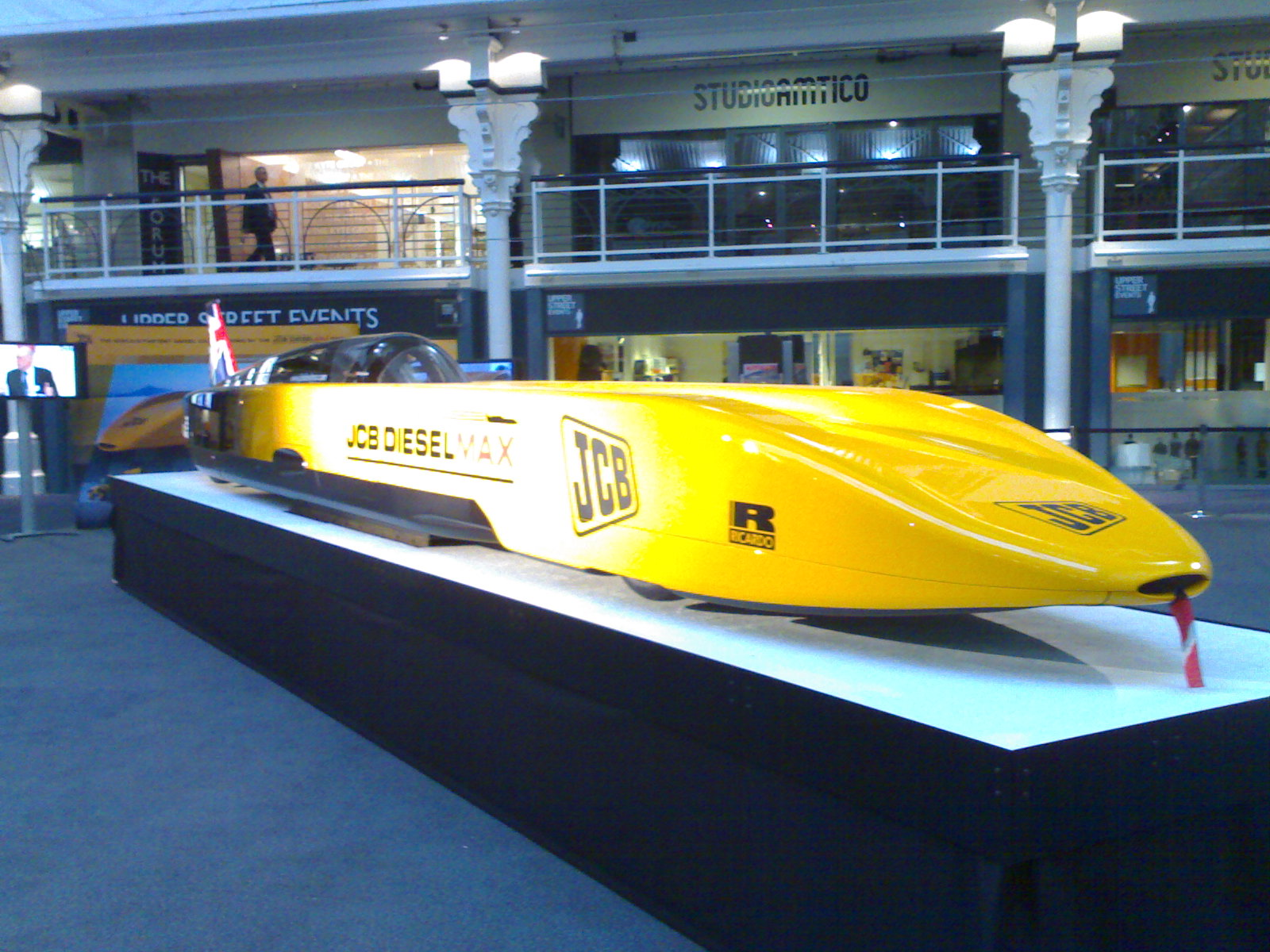

Overview
- Manufacturer: Visioneering

Body and chassis
- Class: Land speed record vehicle (diesel)
- Body style: Long
- Layout: Dual-engine, 4-wheel drive
- Platform: Hybrid square steel tube spaceframe with bonded carbon composite panels

Powertrain
- Engine: Two JCB444 common rail injection diesel engines with twin compound turbochargers and intercoolers
- Transmission: Forward transmission and final drive connected to forward engine; rear transmission and final drive unit connected to rear engine

Dimensions
- Wheelbase: 5.9 m (19 ft)
- Length: 9.1 m (30 ft)
- Width: 1.15 m (3.8 ft)
- Height: 0.98 m (3.2 ft) to canopy; 1.34 m (4.4 ft) to fin tip
- Curb weight: 2.7 t (3.0 short tons)

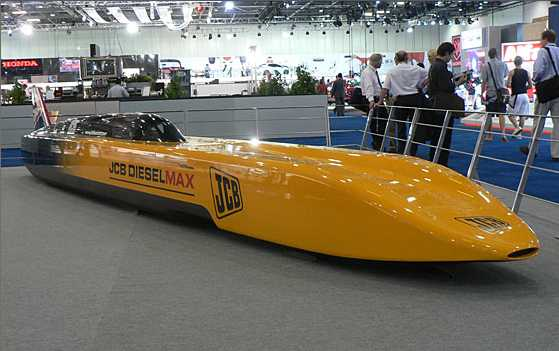
JCB Dieselmax on display at the British International Motor Show

The JCB Dieselmax is a streamliner car designed for the purpose of breaking the land speed record for a diesel-engined vehicle.

The car was built for JCB, a British multinational equipment company. As of 2018, the car holds the world diesel-powered land speed record, having been driven to over 350 miles per hour (560 km/h) by Wing Commander Andy Green in 2006.

== Design ==
The car is powered by two specially-tuned versions of the production JCB444 powerplant, developing up to 560 kW (750 bhp) each (over five times the power output of the production version with 6 bar (87 psi) of boost) and featuring four cylinders and 5 L (310 cu in) of displacement, accompanied by two stage turbochargers, intercooler and aftercooler. One of the dual engines drives the front wheels while the other drives the rear. Each engine is rev-limited to 3800 rpm.

As the size of the car prohibited meaningful wind tunnel testing, the streamlined shape of the car was refined entirely through the use of computational fluid dynamics by MIRA Ltd, which has enabled the car to obtain a very low coefficient of drag of only 0.147 and a C_{d}A value (drag coefficient × frontal area) of only 0.129 m^{2} (1.39 sq ft). The fuel tank, which holds only 9 L (2.4 US gal), is located directly behind the carbon fibre cockpit. The fully laden weight of the vehicle, including fuel, oil, ice, water coolant and the driver, is slightly less than 2,700 kg (6,000 lb).

The chassis was designed and built by Coventry-based engineering company Visioneering for JCB, with engine development undertaken by Sussex-based Ricardo. The electrical system for the vehicle was supplied by R&D Vehicle Systems Ltd under contract to Visioneering. Ron Ayers led work on the aerodynamics, having previously worked on the ThrustSSC land speed record car.

During the 2006 Bonneville Speed Week and subsequent FIA record runs, the car was driven by Andy Green, a serving RAF Officer who previously broke, and still holds, the absolute land speed record with ThrustSSC.

== Background ==
The previous diesel land speed record was 379.413 km/h (235.756 mph), set by an American, Virgil W. Snyder, in a streamliner branded "Thermo King-Wynn's" on 25 August 1973 at the Bonneville Salt Flats, Utah.

Carl Heap held the Southern California Timing Association record at 438.844 km/h (272.685 mph) in his 1947 International K-7 truck powered by a 16V92 Detroit Diesel.

== Performance ==
The car began initial testing on 20 July 2006 on the runway at RAF Wittering with the lower-power 450 kW (600 bhp) version of the JCB444 engine, the team slowly ramping up the speed to prove the chassis and engines. They eventually achieved a speed of over 320 km/h (200 mph) on 30 July 2006. Two days later, the car was disassembled ready to be flown to Wendover Airport, Utah, on the 8th of August. On 13 August 2006, after re-assembling and re-testing the car, the Dieselmax made its first official run on the Bonneville Salt Flats as part of Speed Week, eventually attaining an average speed of 510 km/h (317 mph) to take the SCTA-BNI (Southern California Timing Association and Bonneville Nationals Inc.) event record for an 'AA/DS' Diesel Streamliner.

On 22 August 2006, after being re-fitted with 560 kW (750 bhp) 'LSR' versions of the JCB444 engines, the JCB Dieselmax car broke the official FIA diesel engine land speed record, attaining a speed of 529.099 km/h (328.767 mph). 24 hours later the JCB Dieselmax car broke its own record, achieving a speed of 563.418 km/h (350.092 mph) over a distance of 1.6 km (1 mi) on 23 August 2006. Before attaining these speeds, the Dieselmax was pushed from behind, by a JCB Fastrac, until it hit 48 km/h (30 mph) where it engaged first gear.

The vehicle was fitted with Goodyear 23×15 racing tyres, with larger tyres rejected to allow for a smaller frontal area.

== Future ==
In a live interview from Utah on BBC News, Green said that the car was not running at its full potential, due to problems finding suitable tyres and that this speed was achieved while the car was still in fifth gear (the car has six). He also reported that the vehicle traveled 18 km (11 mi) on about 1 US gal (3.8 L) of fuel. The fuel tank holds just 9 L (2.4 US gal) while the ice tank, used for cooling, holds 180 L (48 US gal).

In 2016 a ten-year anniversary celebration was held, where Lord Bamford expressed regret that the record had not been beaten and indicated that a fresh attempt could be made if the JCB record was broken. Although JCB have not made any official statements on the subject of a return to Bonneville, JCB Group Engineering Director Tim Leverton has hinted that they are currently studying the development of tyres that would allow them to overcome the nominal 560 km/h (350 mph) 'safety limit' they had placed upon their current Goodyear units.

=== Hydromax ===
In 2026, JCB announced a return to Bonneville with the JCB Hydromax, a streamliner vehicle visually similar to Dieselmax, but powered by two hydrogen-fuelled internal combustion engines derived from the JCB444 engine. The 32ft streamliner generated around 1,200 kW (1,600 bhp) overall. On Thursday 6th August, Andy Green piloted Hydromax to a new SCTA record in the AA/BGS (Blown Gas Streamliner) class of 592.797 km/h (368.347 mph). Following Speed Week, JCB remained at Bonneville to pursue an FIA World Record in excess of 640 km/h (400 mph).

== See also ==
- List of vehicle speed records
- JCB Hydromax
