= List of vehicle speed records =

The following is a list of speed records for various types of vehicles. This list only presents the single greatest speed achieved in each broad record category; for more information on records under variations of test conditions, see the specific article for each record category. As with many world records, there may be some dispute over the criteria for a record-setting event, the authority of the organization certifying the record, and the actual speed achieved.

== Land vehicles ==
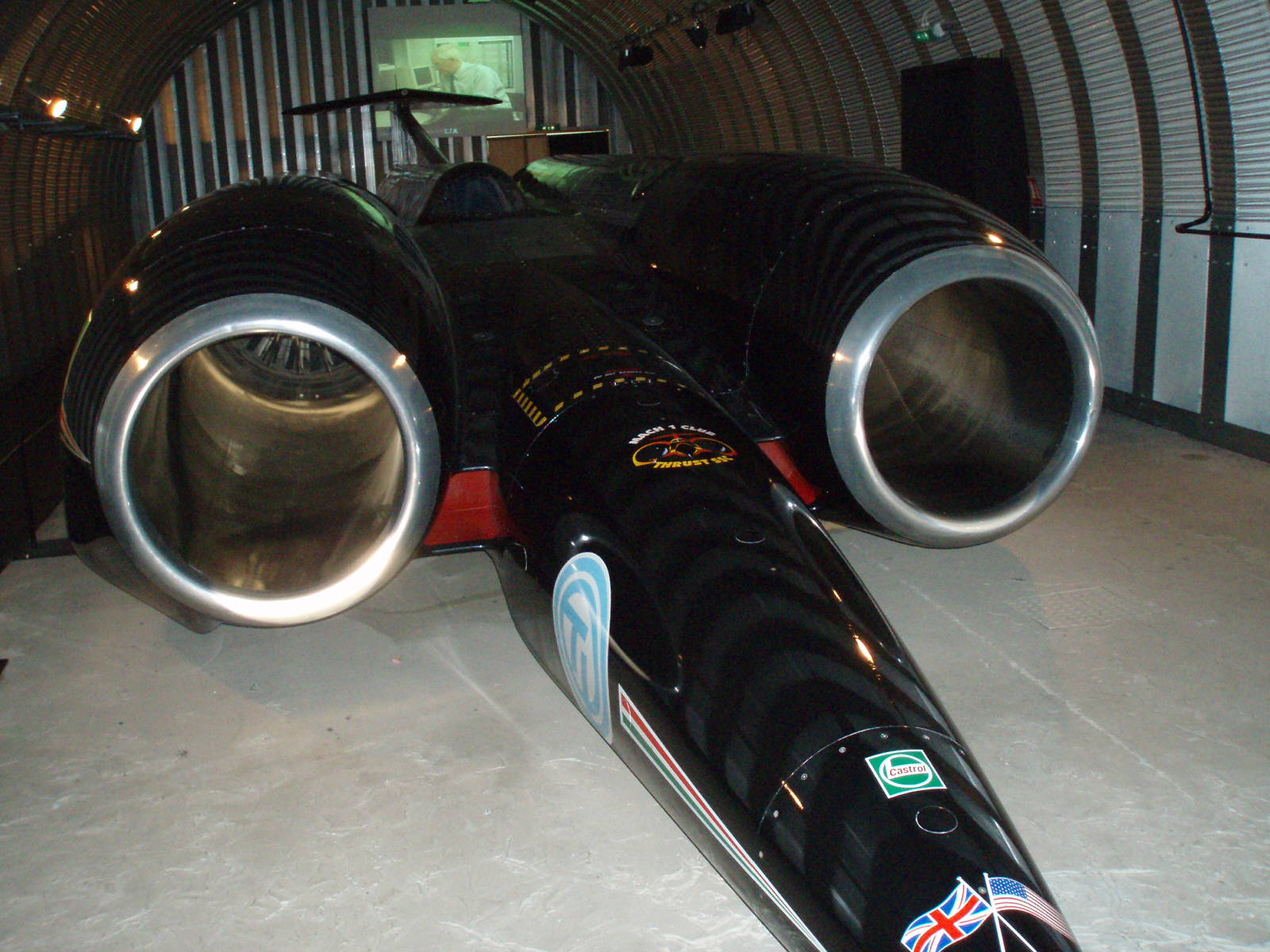
ThrustSSC, which has held the land speed record since 1997

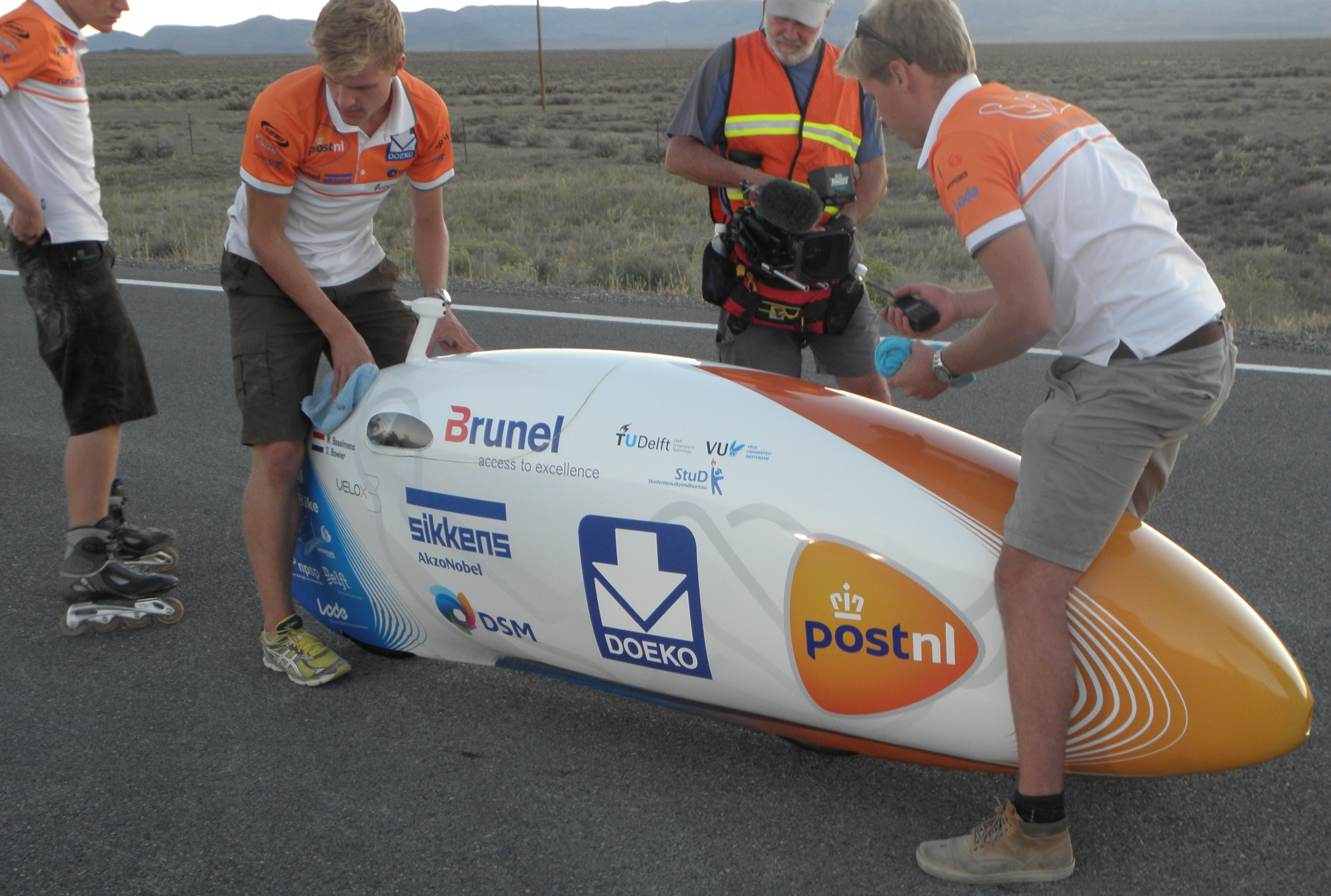
VeloX3, formerly the world's fastest human-powered vehicle

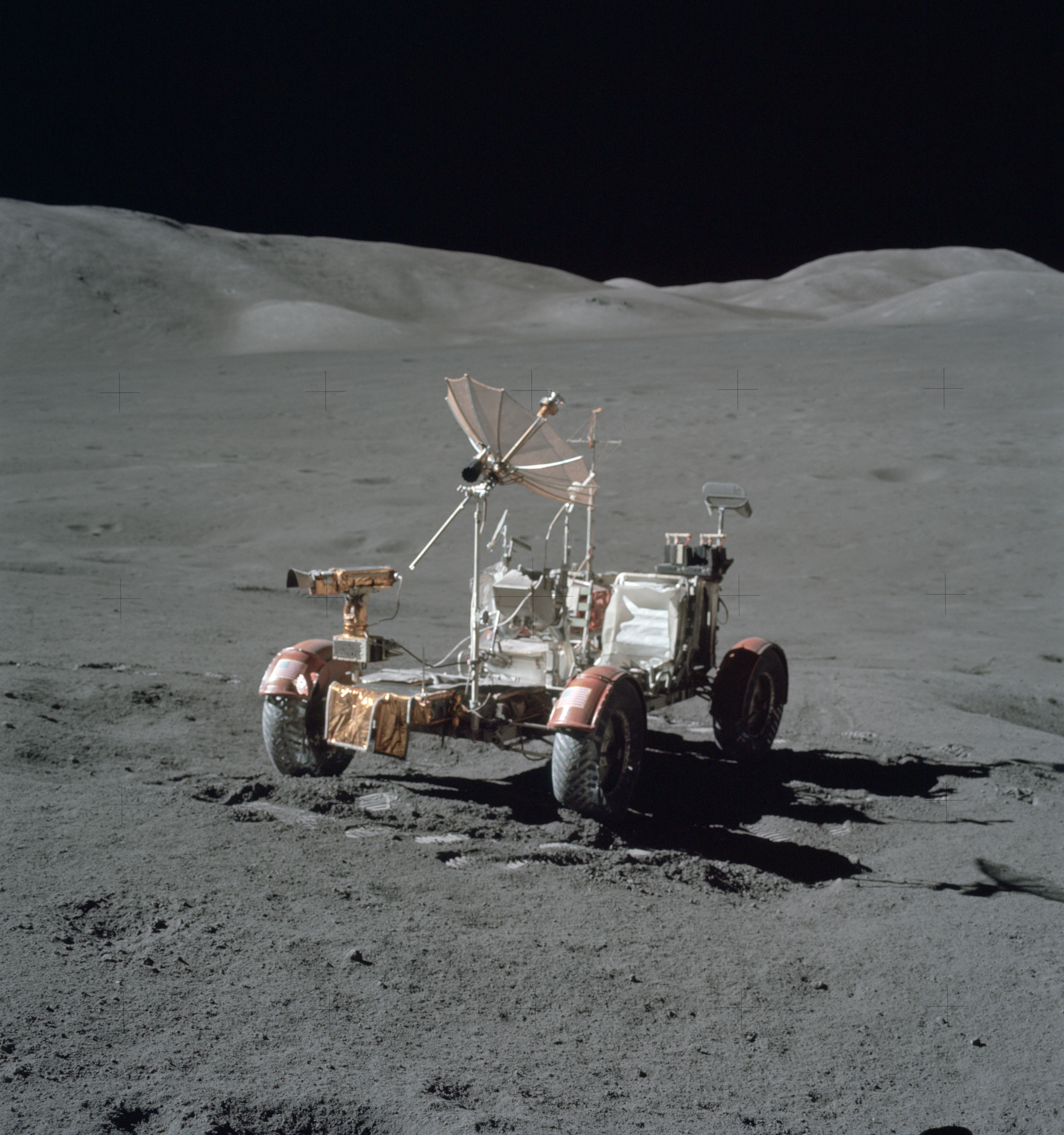
Apollo 17 LRV, fastest vehicle driven on the Moon

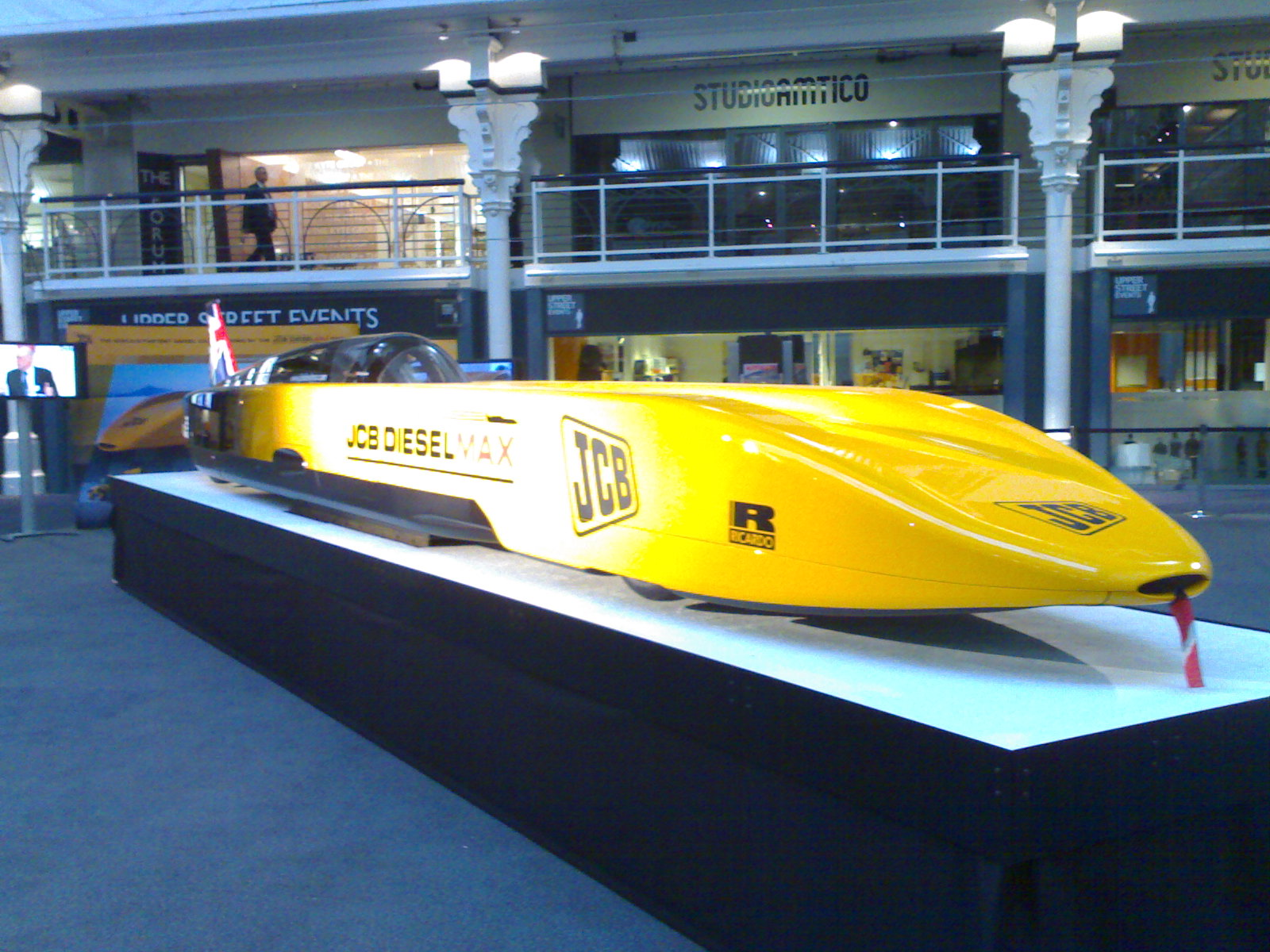
JCB Dieselmax, the fastest diesel car

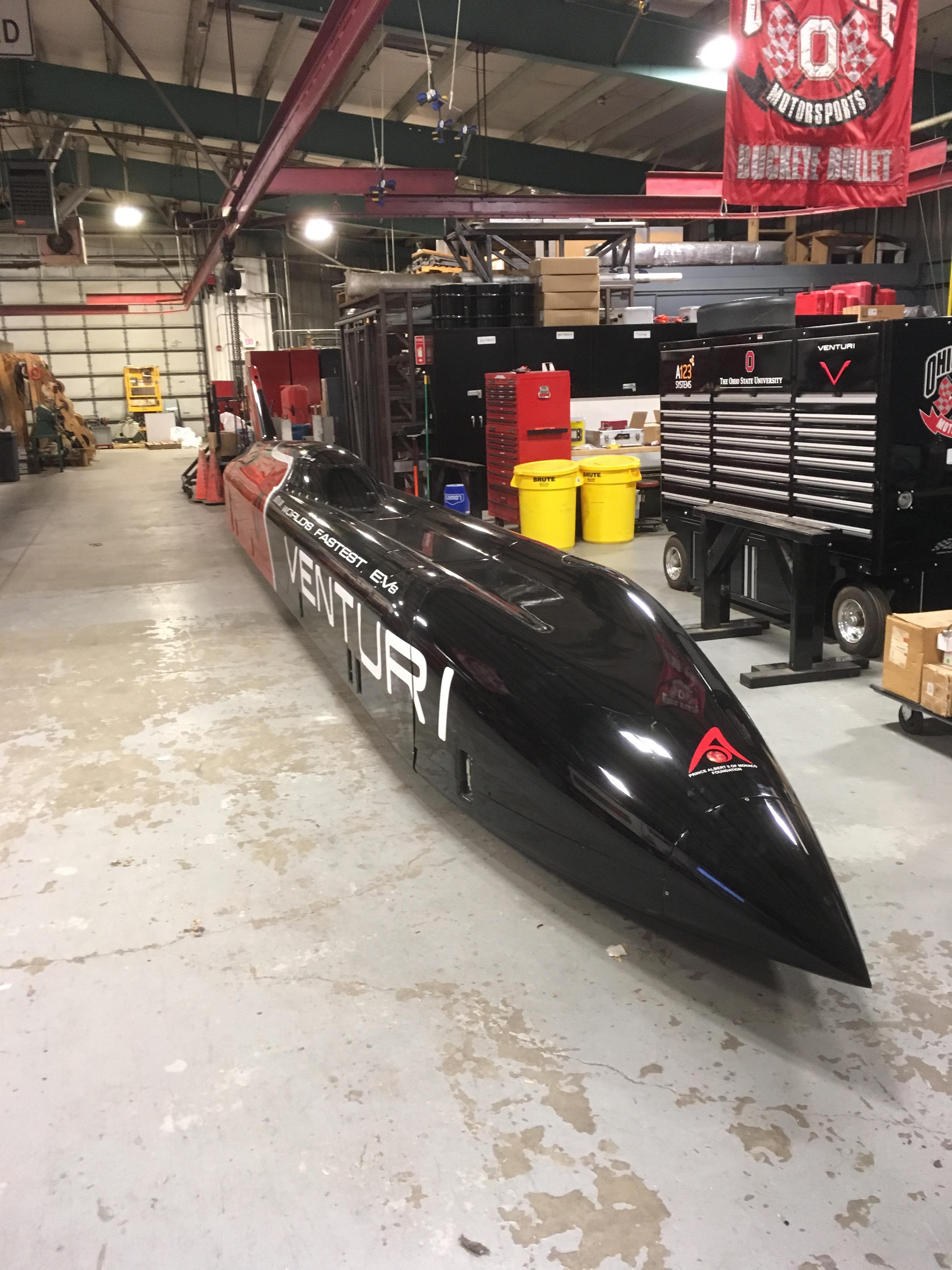
Buckeye Bullet 3, the fastest electric car

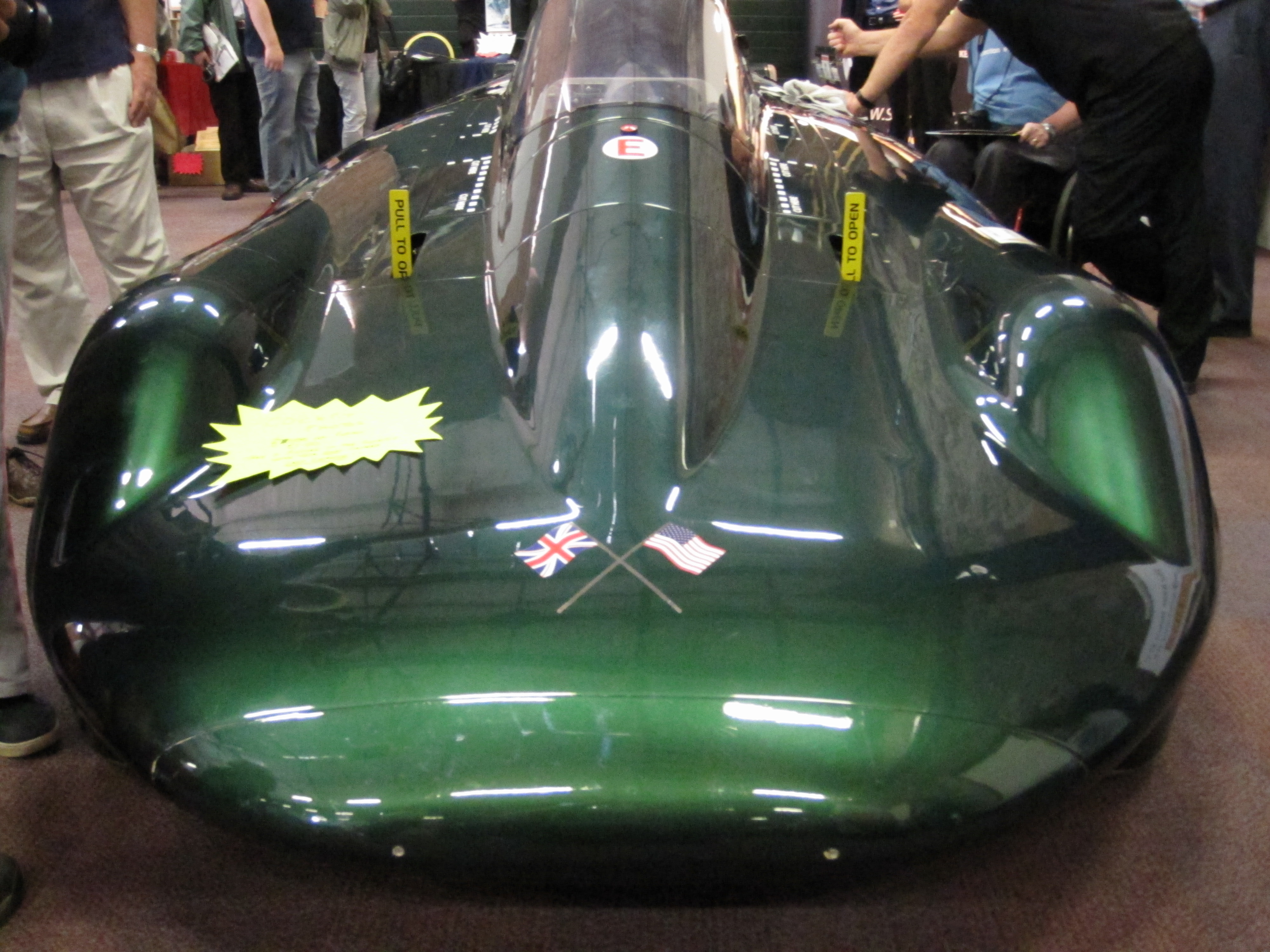
Inspiration, the fastest steam powered vehicle

Land speed records by type of vehicle
| Category | Speed (km/h) | Speed (mph) | Vehicle | Operator | Date | Certifier | Refs |
|---|---|---|---|---|---|---|---|
| Land speed record (Note: Average over two subsequent runs in opposite directions over a 1 mile (1.6 km) course, with flying start) | 1,227.985 | 763.035 | ThrustSSC | Andy Green | 15 Oct 1997 | FIA | |
| Wheel-driven (Note: Average over 1 mile (1.6 km), with a flying start) | 745.187 | 463.038 | Vesco Turbinator II | Dave Spangler | 14 Aug 2018 | SCTA | |
| Piston-engine (Note: Average over two subsequent runs with four hours to work on the vehicle in impound) | 722.204 | 448.757 | Challenger 2 | Danny Thompson | 12 Aug 2018 | SCTA | |
| Hydrogen-powered, piston (Note: Average over two subsequent runs in opposite directions over a 1 kilometre (0.62 mi) course, with flying start) | 653.908 | 406.320 | JCB Hydromax | Andy Green | 11 Aug 2026 | FIA | |
| Motorcycle (Note: Average over 1 kilometre (0.62 mi), with a flying start) | 605.698 | 376.363 | Ack Attack | Rocky Robinson | 25 Sep 2010 | FIM | |
| Diesel-powered | 563.998 | 350.452 | JCB DieselMax | Andy Green | 23 Aug 2006 | FIA | |
| Electric-powered | 550.627 | 342.144 | Venturi Buckeye Bullet 3 | Roger Schroer | 19 Sep 2016 | FIA | |
| Production vehicle | 490.485 | 304.773 | Bugatti Chiron Super Sport 300+ | Andy Wallace | 2 Aug 2019 | TÜV | |
| Radio-controlled car (rocket-powered) | 338.14 | 210.11 | Black Knight | Anthony Lovering | 4 May 2016 | GWR | |
| Radio-controlled car (battery-powered) | 325.12 | 202.02 | RC Bullet | Nic Case | 25 Oct 2014 | GWR | |
| Steam-powered | 238.679 | 148.308 | Inspiration | Don Wales | 25 Aug 2009 | FIA | |
| Wind-powered (Note: Average over 50 metres (160 ft)) | 225.58 | 140.17 | Horonuku | Glenn Ashby | 24 Feb 2023 | FISLY | |
| Human-powered (Note: Unpaced on a straight surface -0.6% grade; average over 200 metres (660 ft), with flying start (For other cycling records, see cycling records)) | 144.17 | 89.58 | AeroVelo Eta | Todd Reichert | 17 Sep 2016 | IHPVA | |
| Tracked vehicle | 121.9 | 75.7 | modified M113 APC | Carl May | Jul/Aug 1979 | US Army | |
| Solar-powered (Note: For vehicles powered directly by solar power, without batteries) | 91.332 | 56.751 | Sky Ace TIGA | Kenjiro Shinozuka | 20 Aug 2014 | GWR | |

Land speed records by surface
| Category | Speed (km/h) | Speed (mph) | Vehicle | Operator | Date | Certifier | Refs |
|---|---|---|---|---|---|---|---|
| On ice | 335.7 | 208.6 | Audi RS 6 | Janne Laitinen | 9 Mar 2013 | FIA | |
| On the Moon | 18.0 | 11.2 | Apollo 17 Lunar Roving Vehicle (LRV‑003) | Eugene Cernan | 11 Dec 1972 | (unofficial) | |
| On Mars | 0.18 | 0.11 | Mars Exploration Rovers; Spirit and Opportunity | Jet Propulsion Laboratory, with semi‑autonomous control | Jul 2004 | GWR | |

== Rail vehicles ==
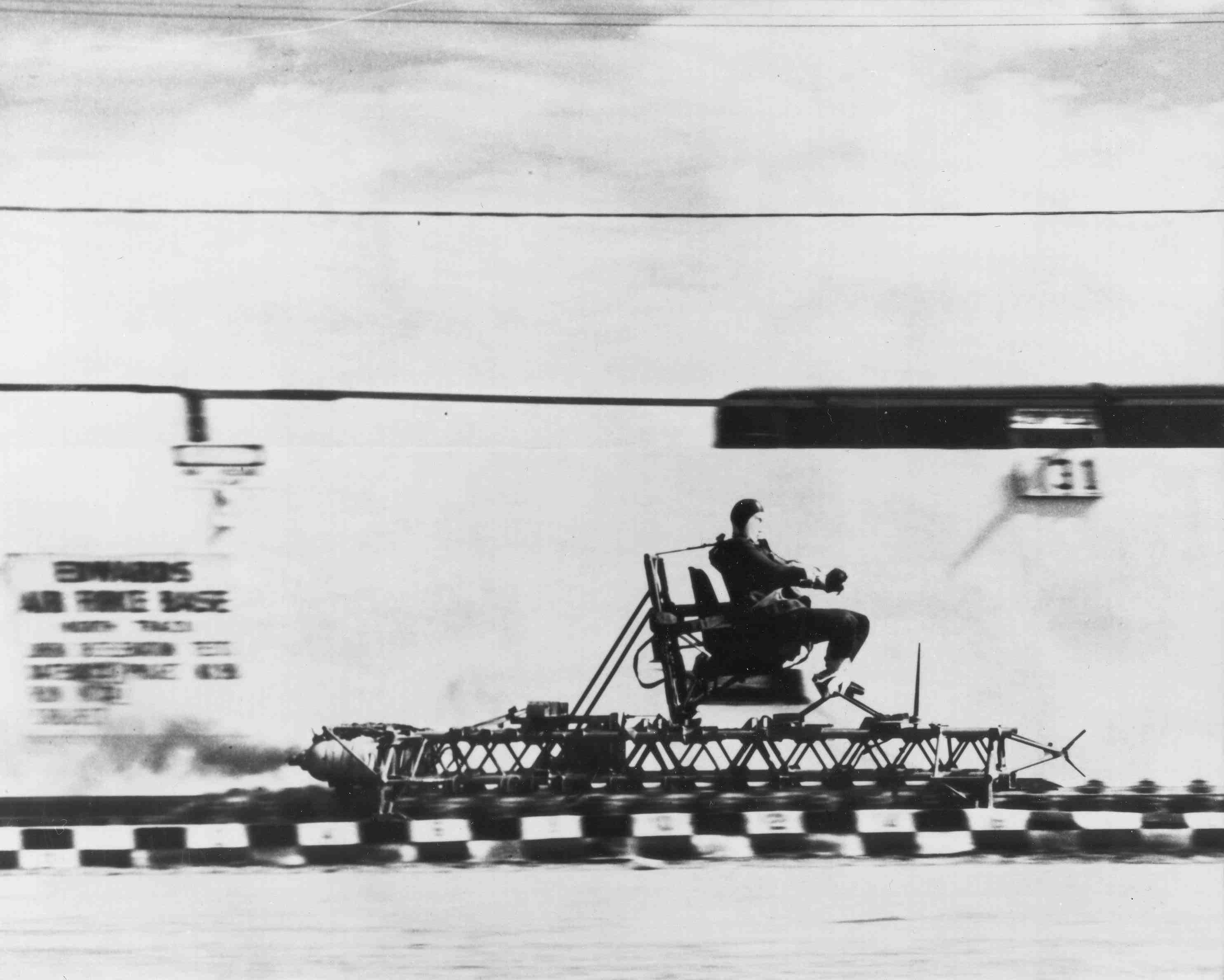
Lt. Col. John P. Stapp rides the rocket sled at Edwards Air Force Base

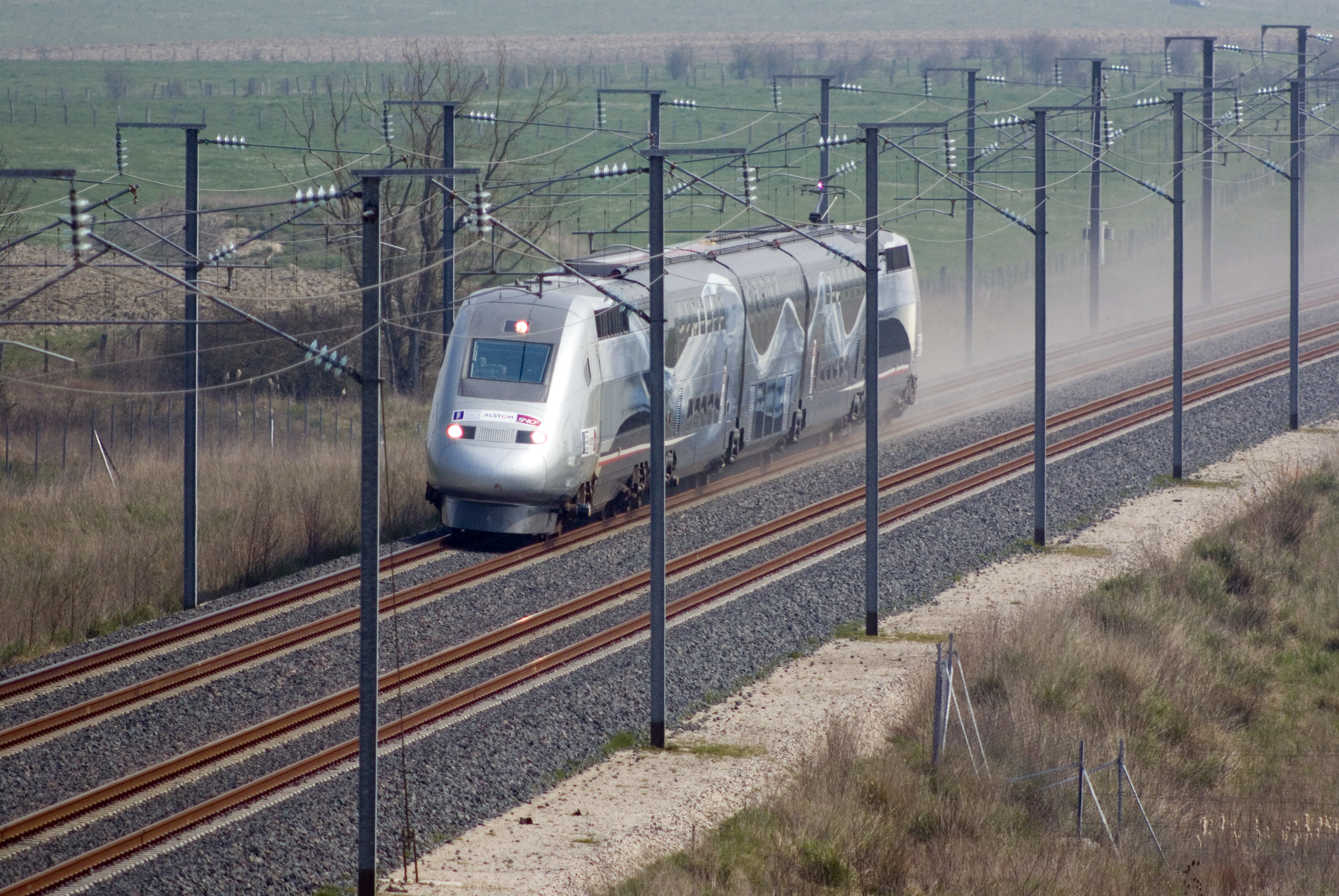
The V150, the world's fastest wheeled train, on its record-breaking run

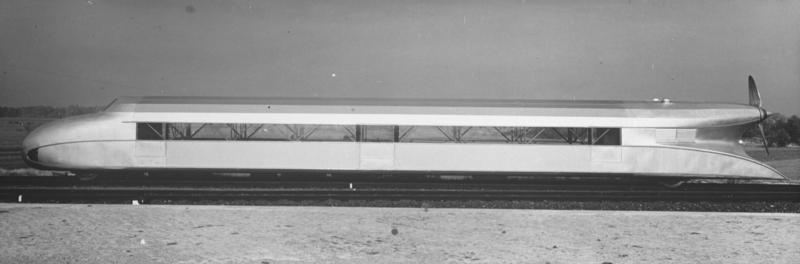
Schienenzeppelin propeller-driven rail car

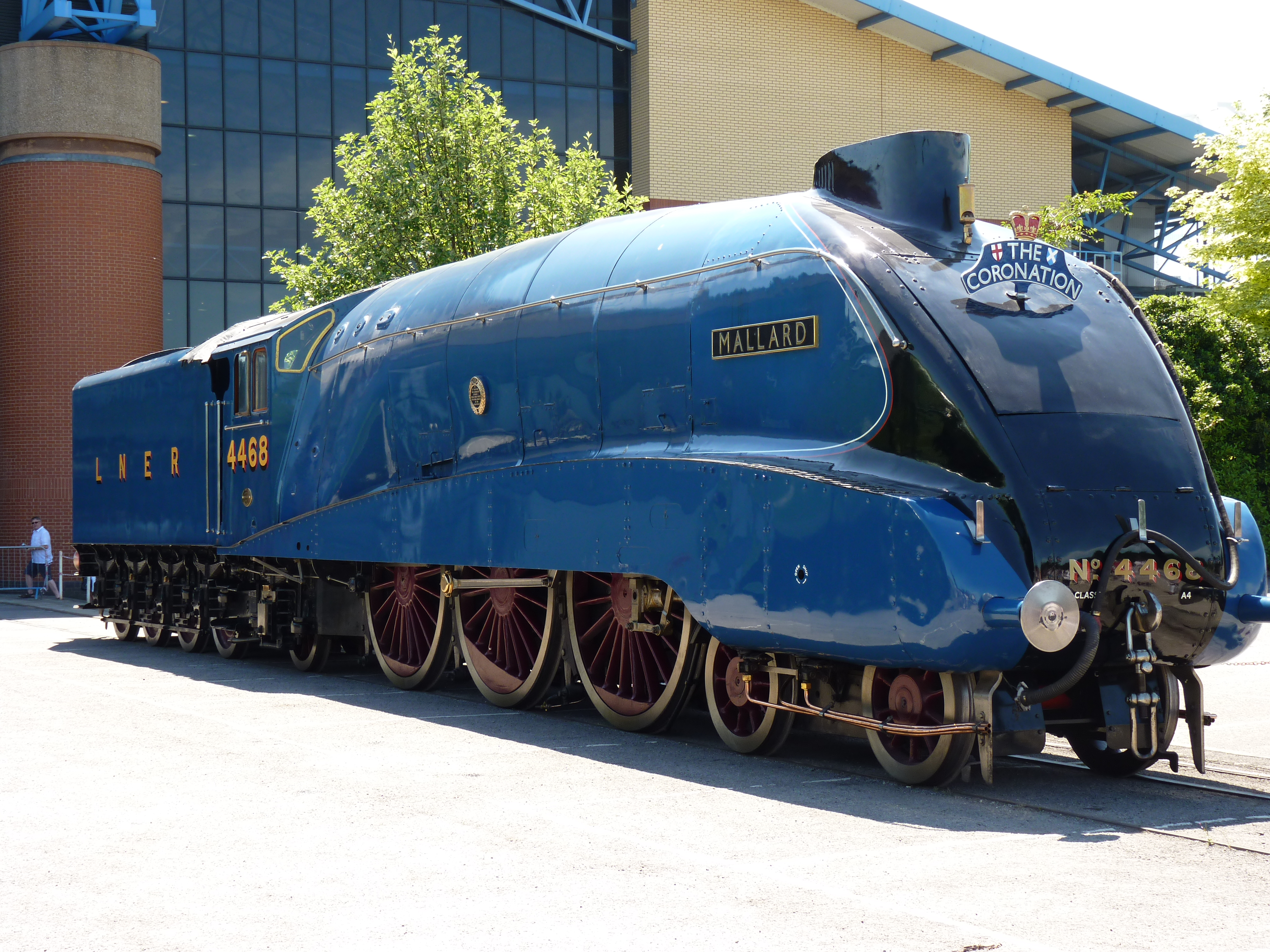
Mallard, the world's fastest steam locomotive

Rail speed records
| Category | Speed (km/h) | Speed (mph) | Vehicle | Operator | Date | Certifier | Refs |
|---|---|---|---|---|---|---|---|
| Rocket sled | 10,326 | 6,416 | Super Roadrunner | (uncrewed) / USAF | 29 Apr 2003 | | |
| Maglev rocket sled | 1,019 | 633 | (unnamed) | (uncrewed) / USAF | 4 Mar 2016 | | |
| Rocket sled (crewed) | 1,017 | 632 | Sonic Wind No. 1 | John Stapp / USAF | 10 Dec 1954 | | |
| Maglev train (crewed) | 603 | 375 | SCMaglev L0 Series | Central Japan Railway Company | 21 Apr 2015 | GWR | |
| Wheeled | 574.8 | 357.2 | TGV POS V150 | Eric Pieczac | 3 Apr 2007 | | |
| Propeller-driven | 230 | 140 | Schienenzeppelin | Franz Kruckenberg | 21 Jun 1931 | | |
| Steam-driven | 202.6 | 125.9 | LNER Class A4; 4468 Mallard | Joseph Duddington and Thomas Bray | 3 Jul 1938 | | |

== Aircraft ==
Aircraft speed records are based on true airspeed, rather than ground speed.

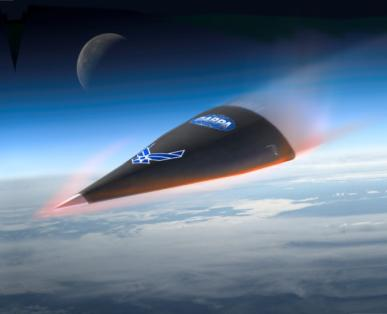
HTV-2 (artist rendering), the fastest uncrewed aerial vehicle

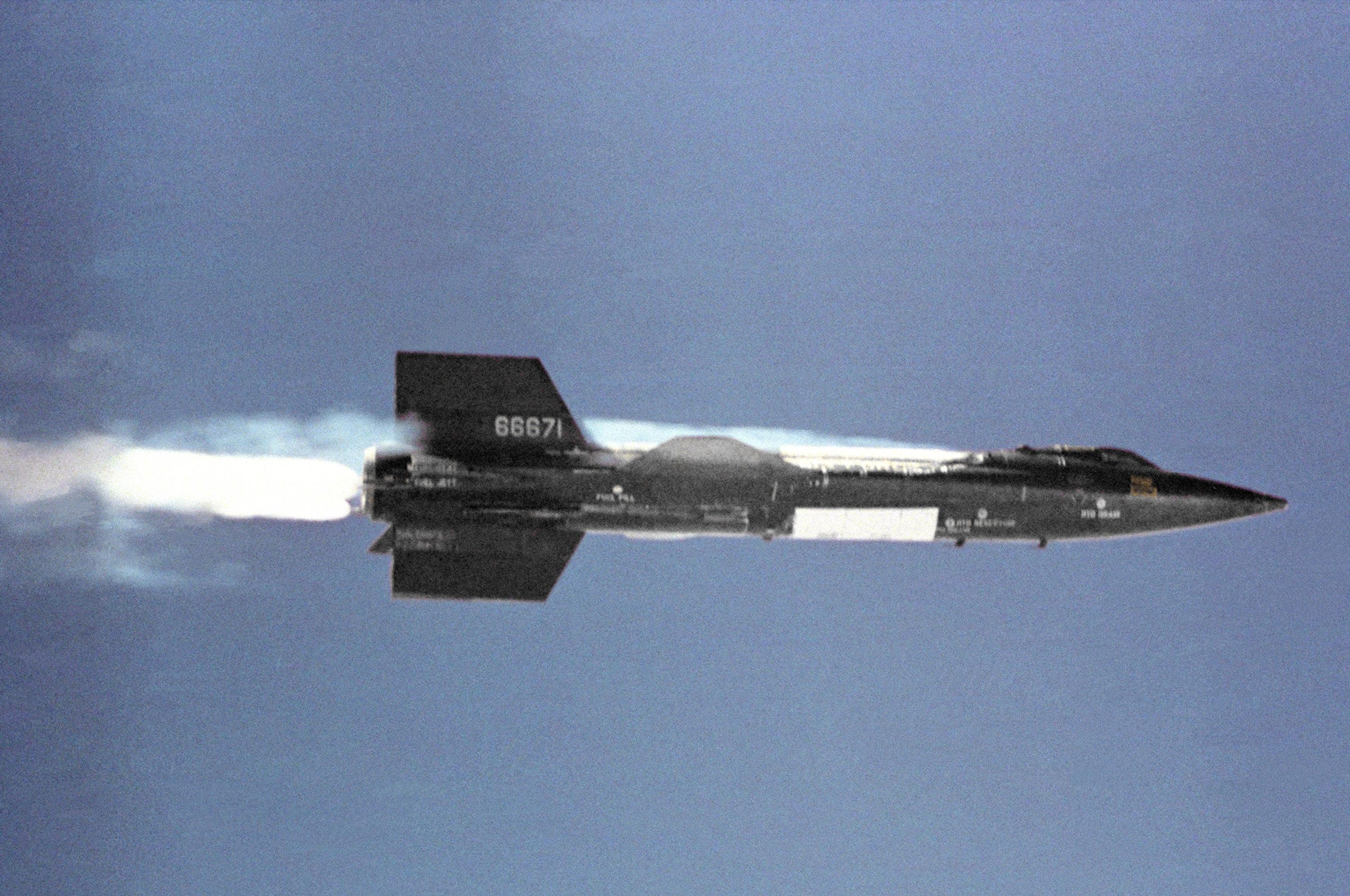
North American X-15, the fastest piloted rocket-powered aircraft

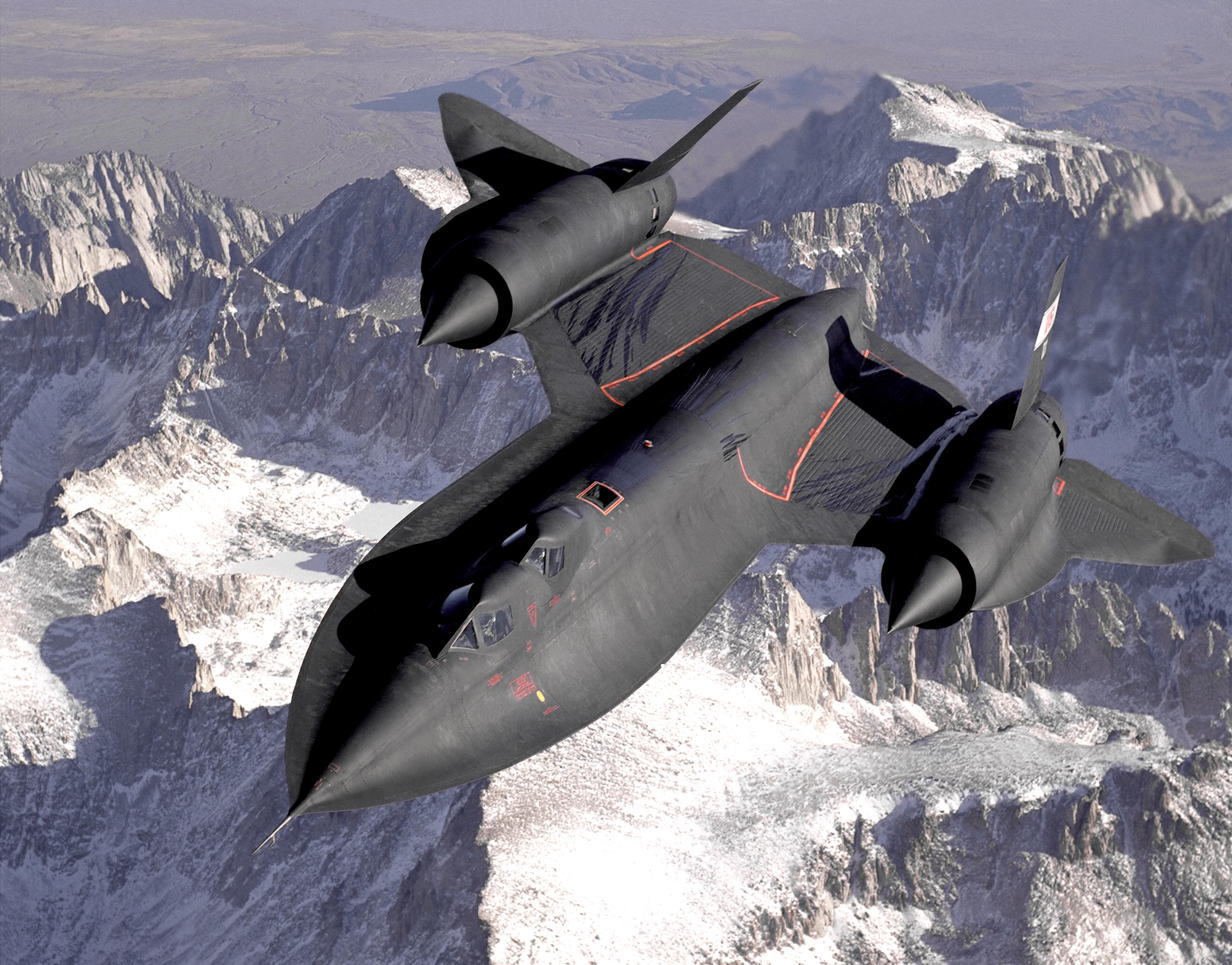
SR-71 Blackbird, the fastest piloted air-breathing aircraft

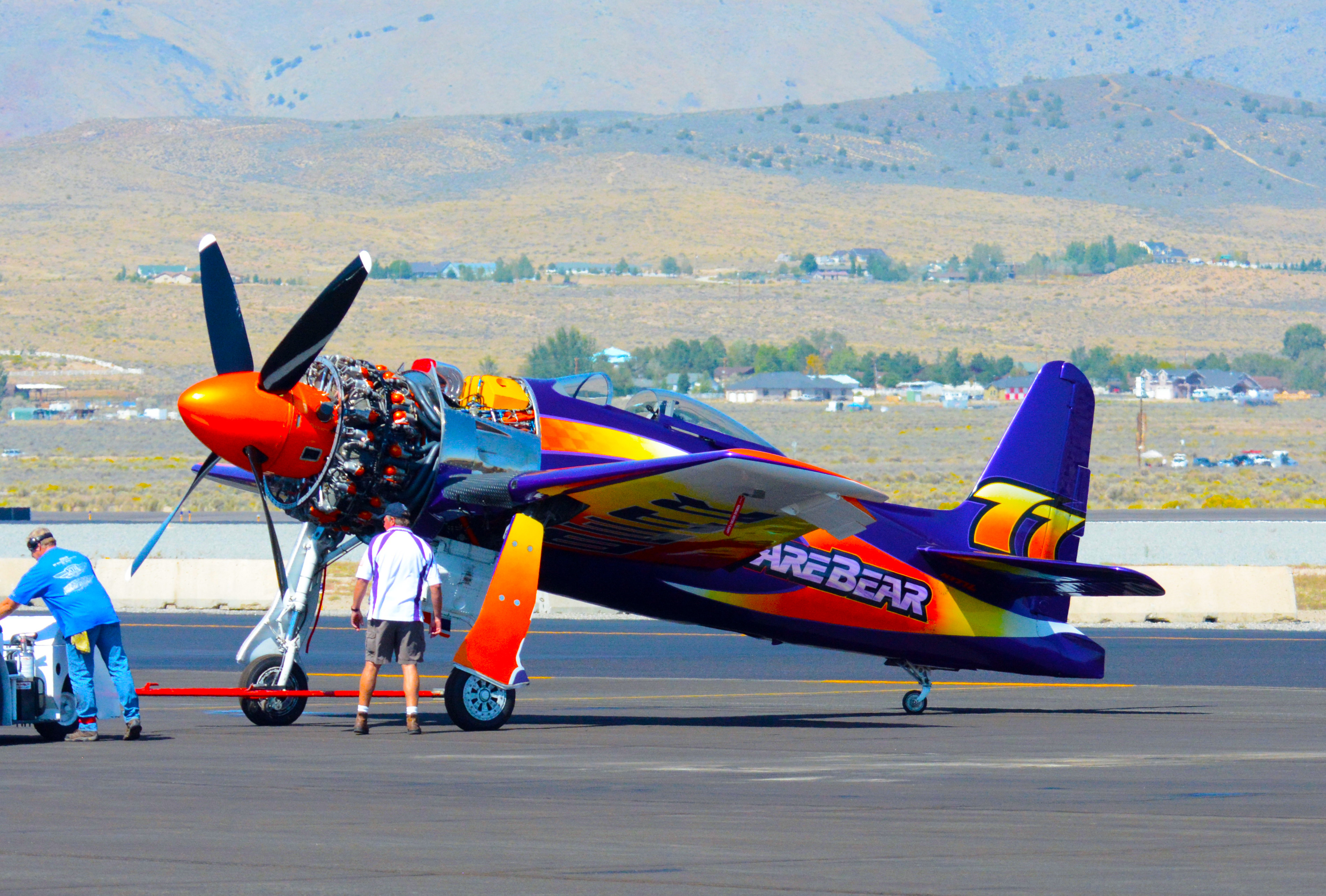
Rare Bear, the fastest piston-engined aircraft

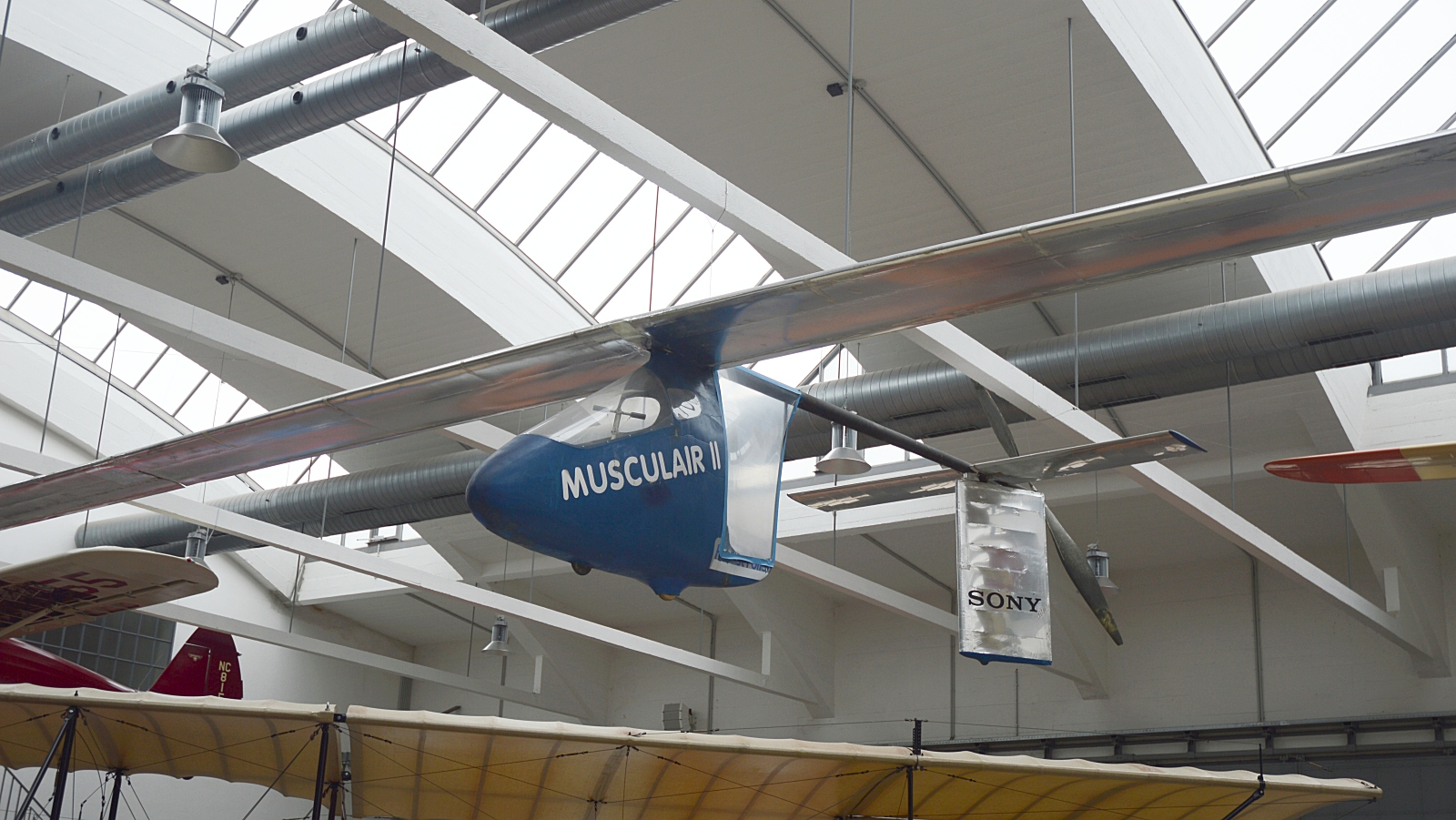
Musculair 2, the fastest human-powered aircraft

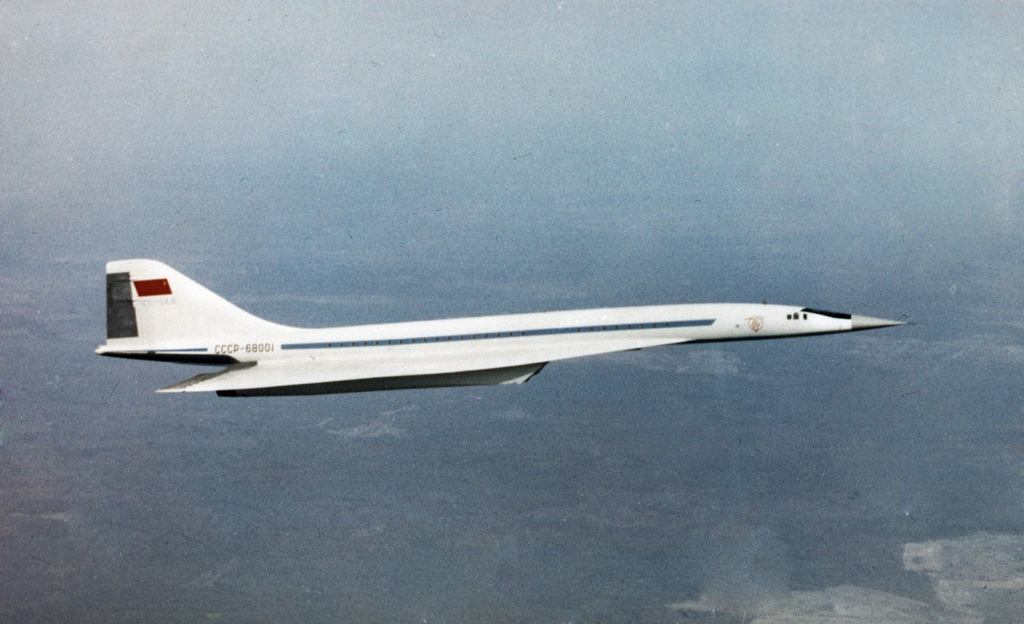
Tupolev Tu-144, the fastest commercial aircraft

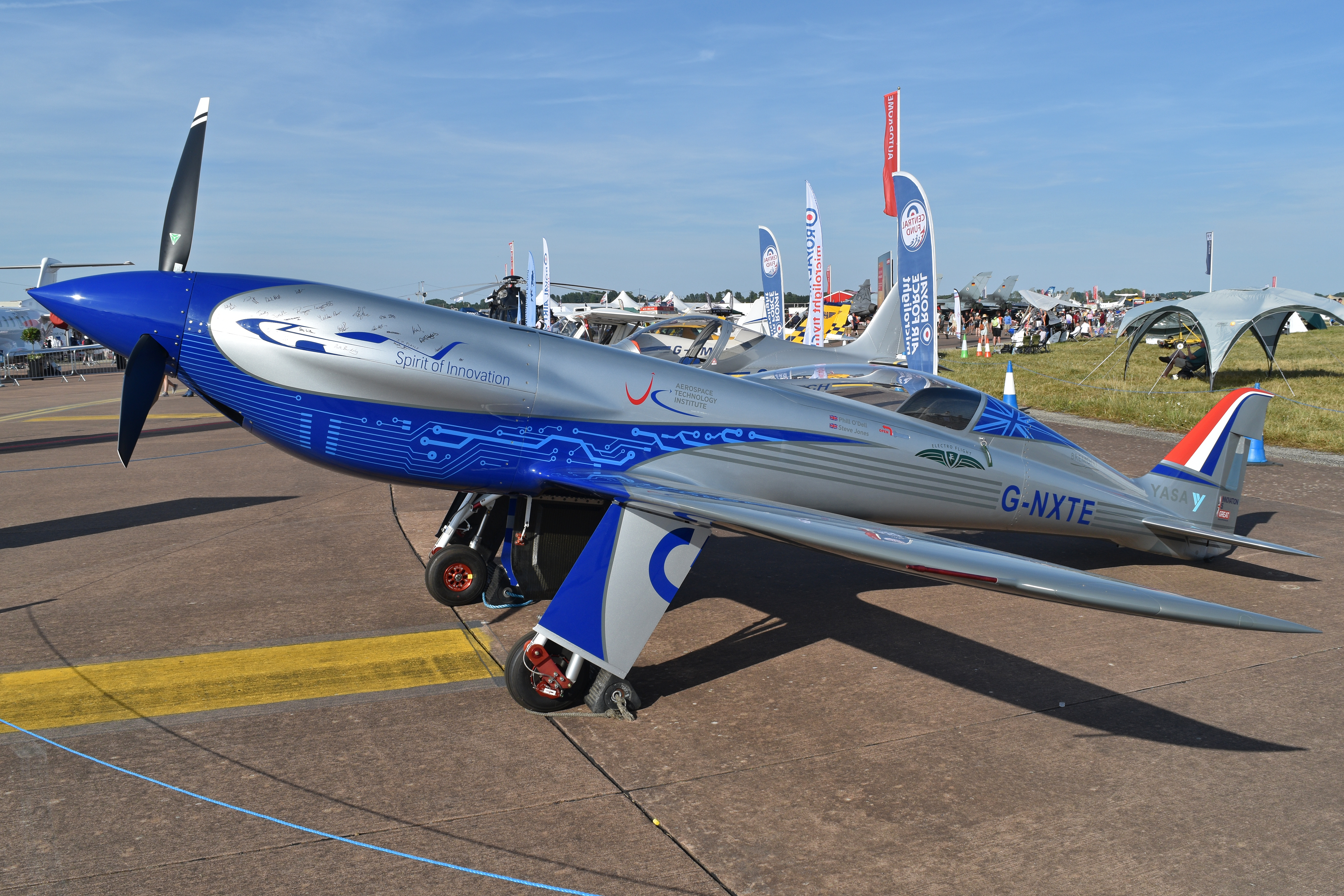
Rolls-Royce ACCEL, the fastest electric aircraft

Airspeed records
| Category | Speed (km/h) | Speed (mph) | Mach No. (Note: Mach number depends on ambient temperature, and thus altitude, as well as speed; it is not a direct measure of speed.) | Vehicle | Crew | Date | Certifier | Refs |
|---|---|---|---|---|---|---|---|---|
| Uncrewed aerial vehicle | 21,245 | 13,201 | ~20 | HTV‑2 | (uncrewed) | 22 Apr 2010 | (unofficial) | |
| Crewed, rocket-powered | 7,270 | 4,520 | 6.7 | North American X‑15A‑2 | William J. Knight | 3 Oct 1967 | GWR | |
| Crewed, air-breathing | 3,529.56 | 2,193.17 | 3.3 | Lockheed SR‑71A Blackbird #61‑7958 | Eldon W. Joersz | 28 Jul 1976 | FAI | |
| Commercial | 2,428.5 | 1,509.0 | 2.35 | Tupolev Tu-144 | Eduard Yelyan | Nov 1970 | (unofficial) | |
| Propeller-driven | 927.4 | 576.3 | ~ 0.85 | Piaggio P.180 Avanti | Joseph J. Ritchie, Steve Fossett | 6 Feb 2003 | FAI | |
| Piston-engined | 850.24 | 528.31 | 0.69 | Grumman F8F Bearcat (modified); Rare Bear | Lyle Shelton | 21 Aug 1989 | FAI | |
| Electric (Note: Over a 3-kilometer course) | 555.9 | 345.4 | 0.45 | Rolls-Royce Accel; Spirit of Innovation | Steve Jones | 19 Nov 2021 | FAI | |
| Helicopter (Note: Unofficial helicopter speed records by the Sikorsky X2 (460 km/h on 15 September 2010) and the Eurocopter X3 (472 km/h on 7 June 2013) would surpass this record if accepted.) | 400.87 | 249.09 | 0.33 | Westland Lynx 800; G‑LYNX | John Egginton | 11 Aug 1986 | FAI | |
| Glider (sailplane) (Note: Average speed over an out-and-return course of 500 km) | 306.8 | 190.6 | 0.25 | Schempp‑Hirth Nimbus‑4DM | Klaus Ohlmann (pilot), Matias Garcia Mazzaro | 22 Dec 2006 | FAI | |
| Airship (Note: Greater speeds reportedly achieved by rigid airships, including 140.3 kilometres per hour (87.2 mph) by the American USS Macon (ZRS-5), are not recognized by the FAI, because these runs did not account for wind speed by flying a set course in both directions.) | 115.1 | 71.5 | 0.09 | Zeppelin Luftschifftechnik; LZ N07‑100 (DLZFN) | Steve Fossett (pilot), Hans‑Paul Ströhle | 27 Oct 2004 | FAI | |
| Human-powered | 44.32 | 27.54 | 0.03 | Musculair 2 | Holger Rochelt | 2 Oct 1985 | FAI | |
| Ground effect vehicle | See entry under § Watercraft. | | | | | | | |
| Mars aircraft | 36 | 22 | - | Ingenuity | (uncrewed) | 12 Oct 2023 | (unofficial) | |

== Watercraft ==
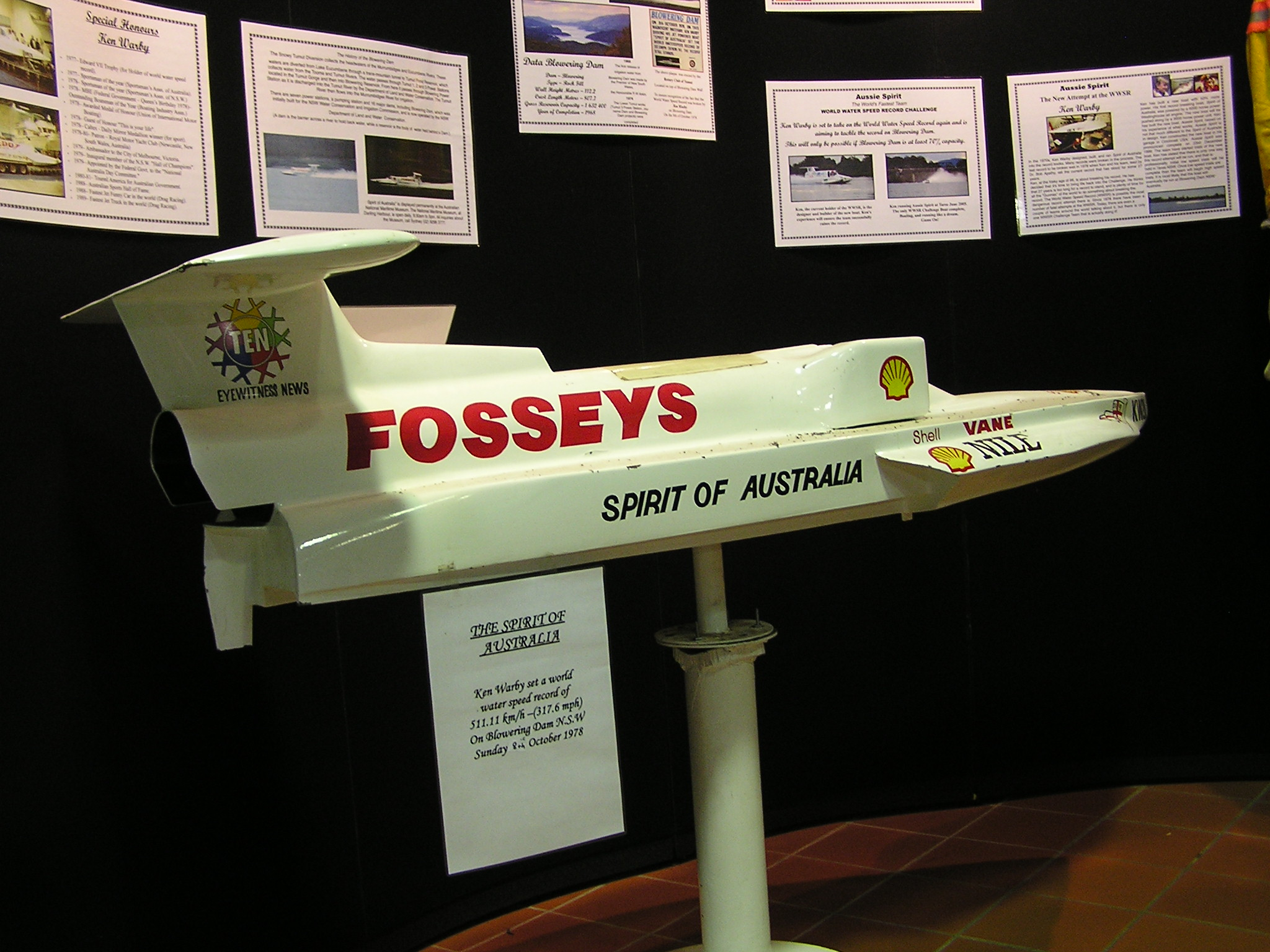
Model of Spirit of Australia, which holds the water speed record

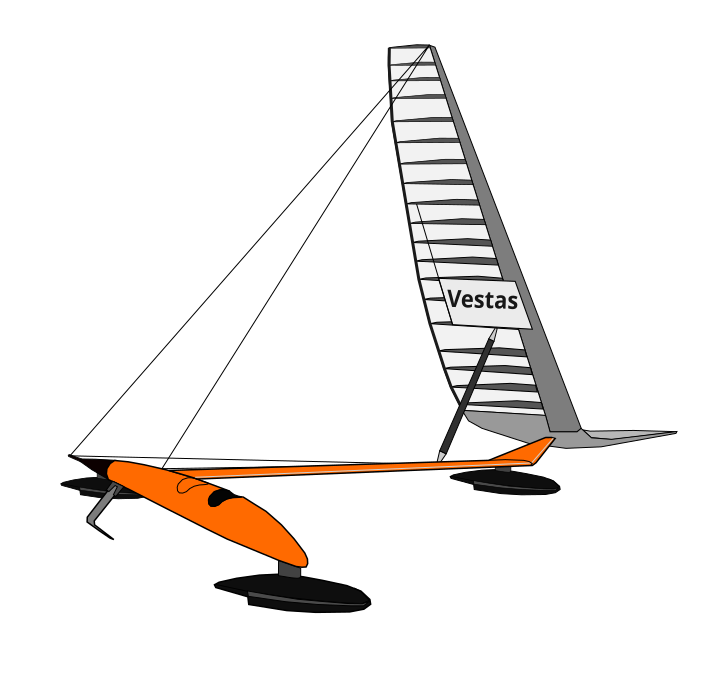
Vestas Sailrocket, the fastest wind-powered watercraft

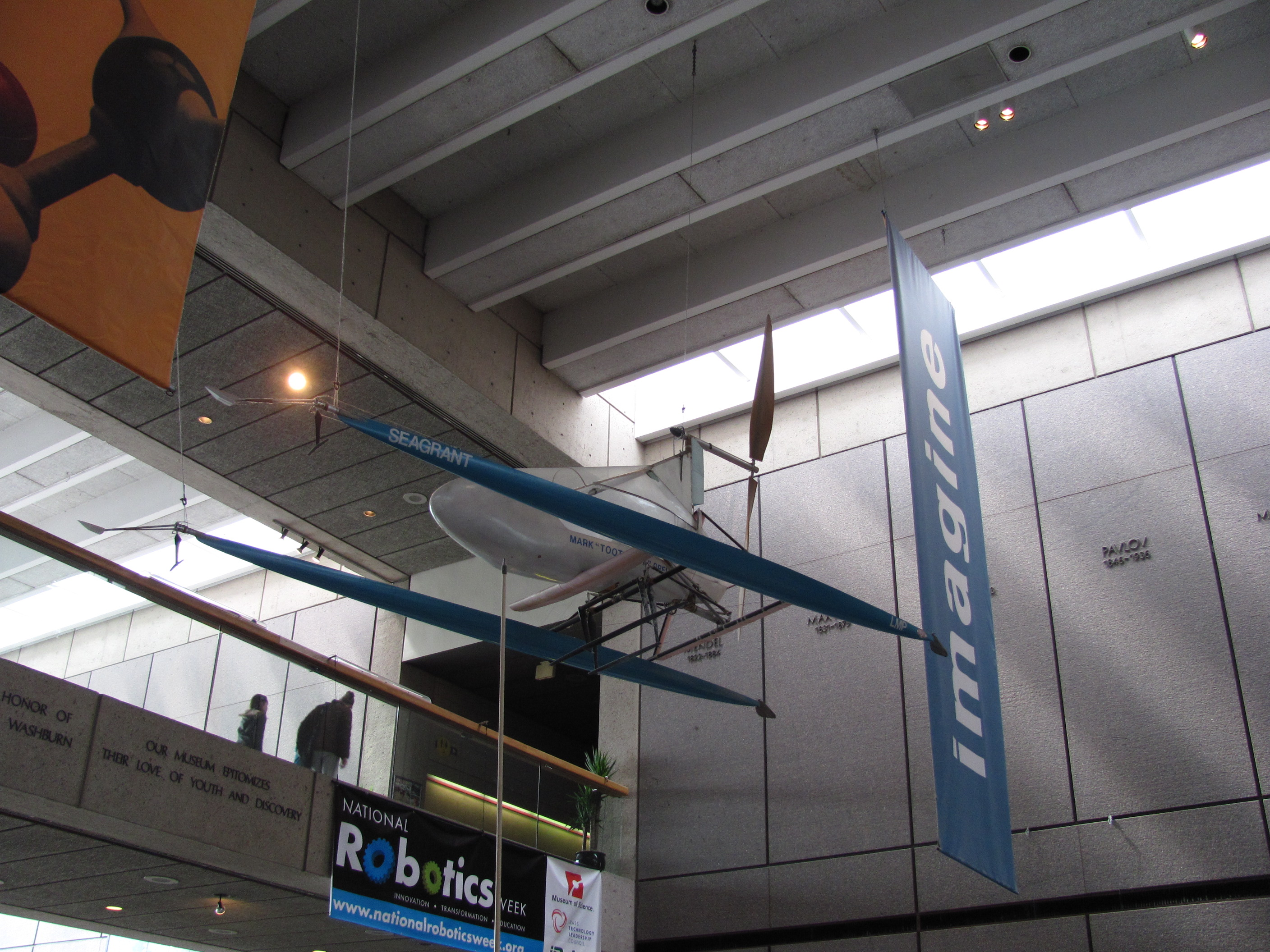
Decavitator, the fastest human-powered watercraft

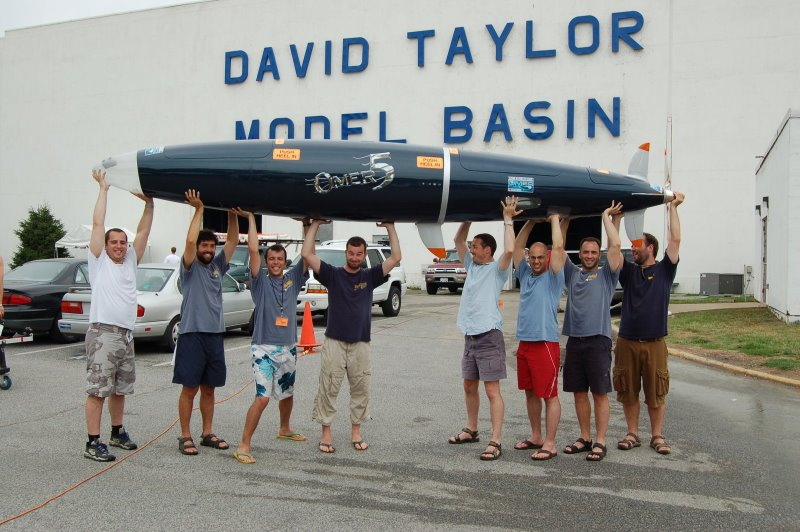
Omer 5, the fastest human-powered submarine

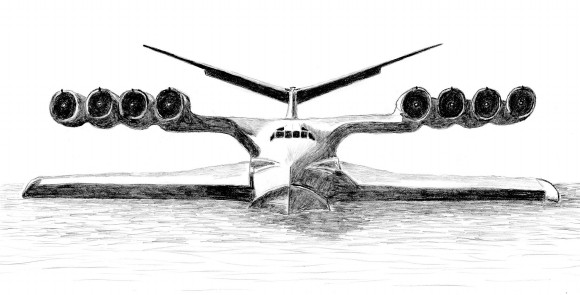
The "Caspian Sea Monster", the fastest ground-effect vehicle (Note: Ground effect vehicles (a.k.a. "Wing-In-Ground effect vehicles") are classified as maritime vessels, rather than aircraft, by the International Maritime Organization.)

Water speed records
| Category | Speed (knots) | Speed (km/h) | Speed (mph) | Vehicle | Operator | Date | Certifier | Refs |
|---|---|---|---|---|---|---|---|---|
| Water speed record | 275.98 | 511.11 | 317.59 | Spirit of Australia | Ken Warby | 8 Oct 1978 | UIM | |
| Propeller-driven | 226.78 | 420.00 | 260.97 | Problem Child | Daryl Ehrlich | 22 Nov 2009 | IHBA, GWR | |
| Wind-powered | 65.45 | 121.21 | 75.32 | Vestas Sailrocket 2 | Paul Larsen | 24 Nov 2012 | WSSRC | |
| Hovercraft (Note: Measured over 1 km with a flying start) | 74.2 | 137.4 | 85.4 | Universal UH19P; Jenny II | Bob Windt | 1 Jan 1995 | WHF, GWR | |
| Human-powered | 18.5 | 34.3 | 21.3 | Decavitator | Mark Drela | 27 Oct 1991 | IHPVA | |
| Human-powered submarine | 8.035 | 14.881 | 9.247 | Omer 5 | Sebastien Brisebois, Joel Brunet | 28 Jun 2007 | ISR | |
| Ground effect vehicle | 350 | 650 | 400 | Korabl Maket "Caspian Sea Monster" | Soviet Navy | ca. 1966–1980 | (unofficial) | |
| Underwater vehicle | There is no officially recognized speed record for underwater craft, due to the secretive nature of military vessels. In 1968, a Soviet November-class submarine reportedly tracked an American carrier group traveling at 31 knots (57 km/h; 36 mph). Uncrewed torpedo speed claims range from 60 knots (110 km/h; 69 mph) for the British Spearfish torpedo to 200 knots (370 km/h; 230 mph) for the Russian VA-111 Shkval. | | | | | | | |

== Spacecraft ==
In order to unambiguously express the speed of a spacecraft, a frame of reference must be specified. Typically, this frame is fixed to the body with the greatest gravitational influence on the spacecraft, as this is the most relevant frame for most purposes. Velocities in different frames of reference are not directly comparable; thus the matter of the "fastest spacecraft" depends on the reference frame used.

Because of the influence of gravity, maximum velocities are usually attained when a spacecraft is close to its primary body: either just after launch, at a point of closest approach (periapsis), or during the early stages of atmospheric entry.

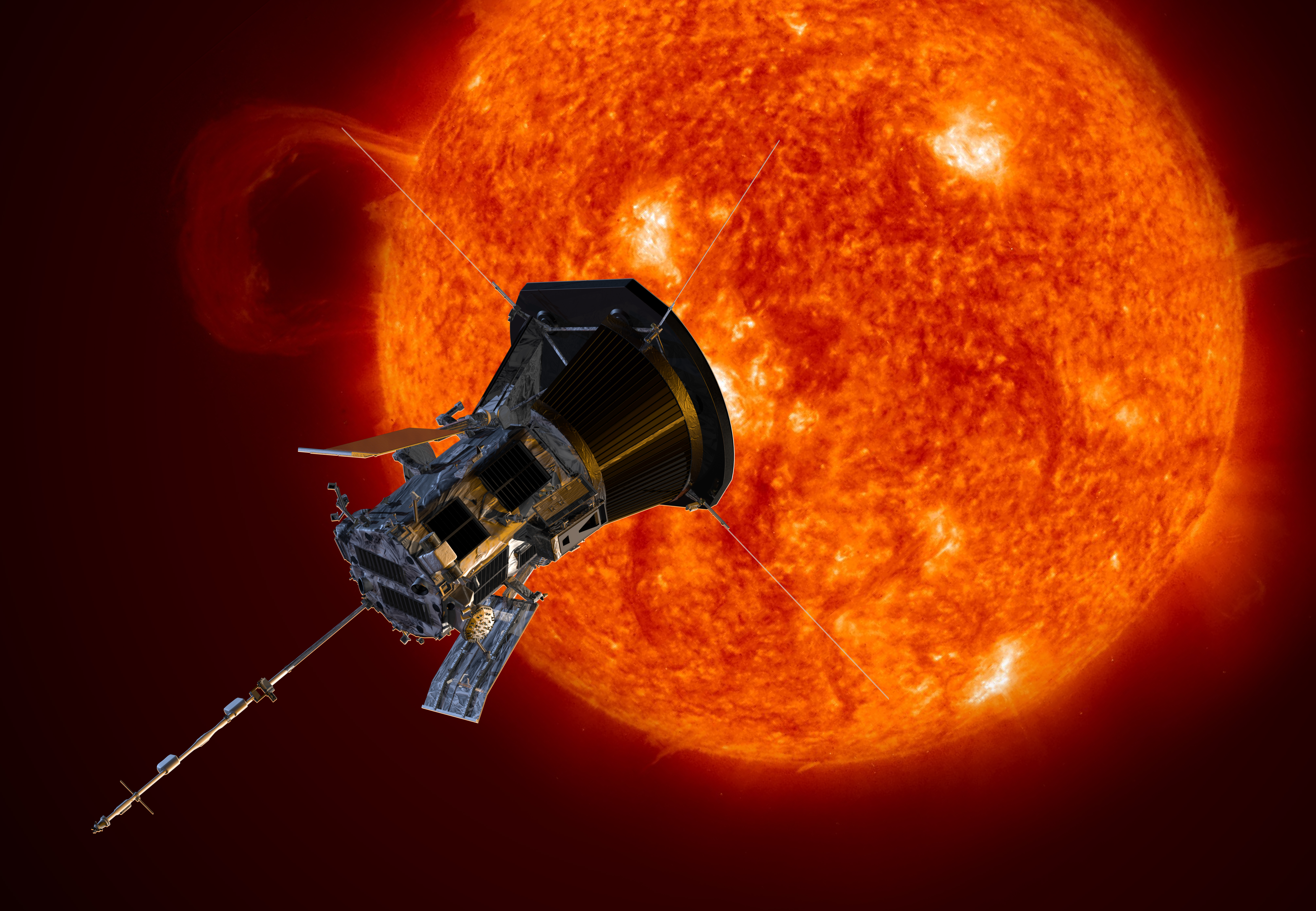
Parker Solar Probe (artist rendering), fastest spacecraft relative to the Sun

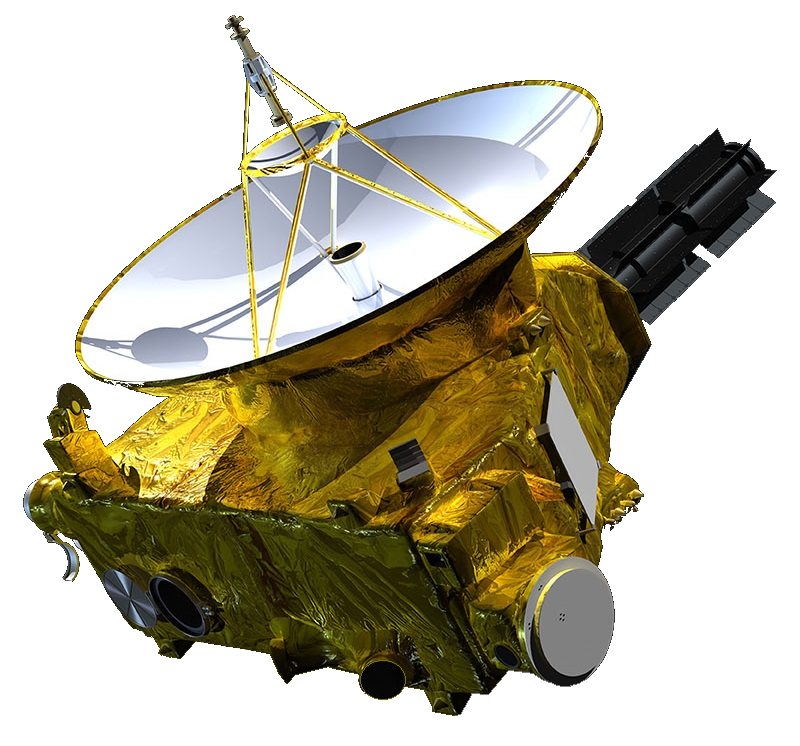
New Horizons (artist rendering), fastest spacecraft upon departing Earth

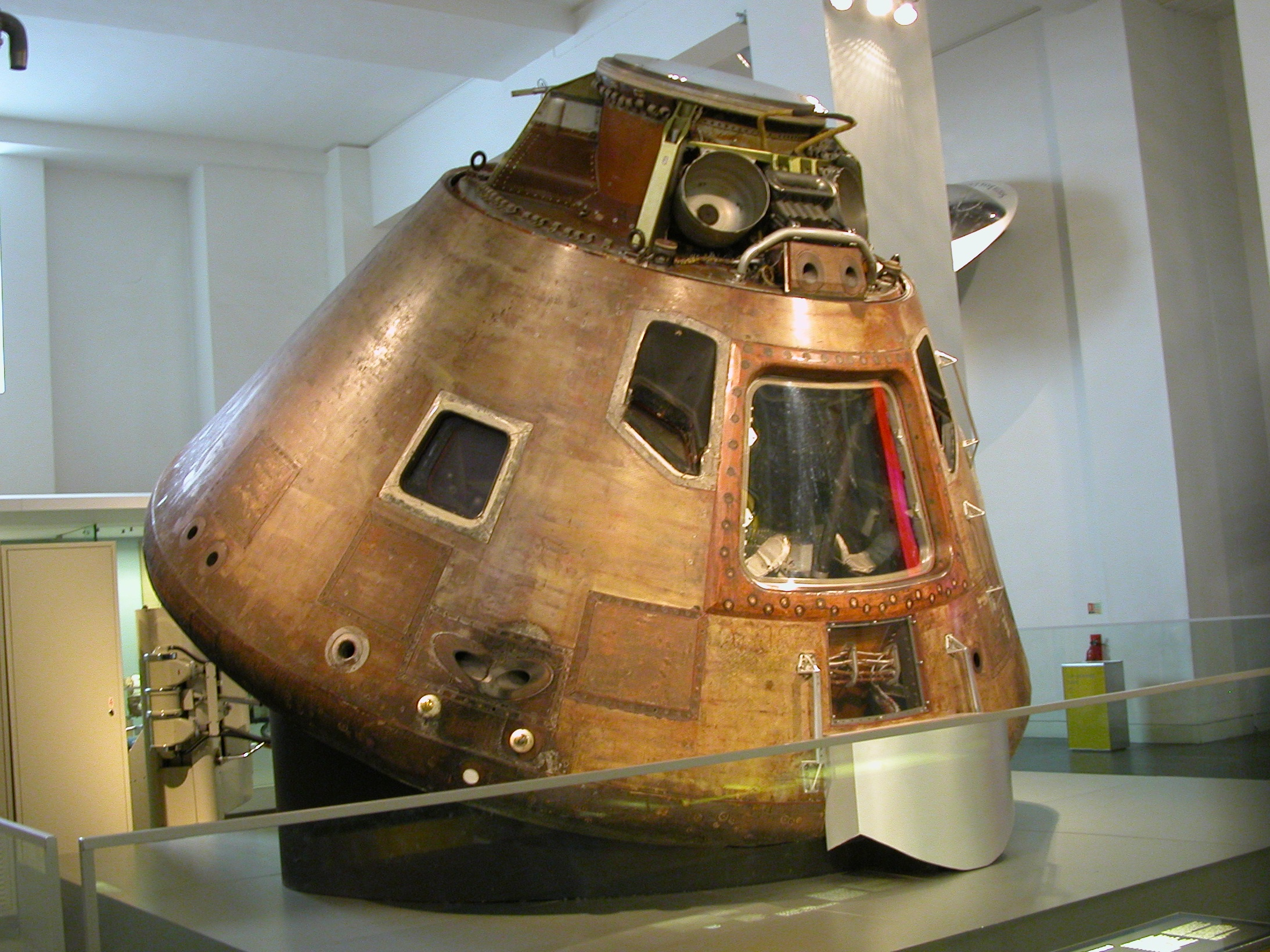
Apollo 10 CSM Charlie Brown, fastest crewed vehicle relative to Earth

Space speed records
| Frame of reference | Category | Speed relative to frame of reference | | | Vehicle | Operator | Crew | Date | Refs (Note: Speed records in this class are generally reported by the spacecraft operator and not independently verified.) |
| Frame of reference | Category | km/h | km/s | mph | Vehicle | Operator | Crew | Date | Refs |
|---|---|---|---|---|---|---|---|---|---|
| Sun | Periapsis | 692,000 | 192 | 430,000 | Parker Solar Probe | (United States) NASA | (uncrewed) | 24 Dec 2024 | |
| Earth | Escape | 58,536 | 16.26 | 36,370 | New Horizons | (United States) NASA | (uncrewed) | 19 Jan 2006 | |
| Earth | Entry | 46,100 | 12.8 | 28,600 | Stardust | (United States) NASA | (uncrewed) | 15 Jan 2006 | |
| Earth | Entry (crewed) | 39,897 | 11.08 | 24,790 | Apollo 10 CSM Charlie Brown | (United States) NASA | Thomas Stafford, John Young, Eugene Cernan | 26 May 1969 | |
| Mars | Entry | 27,000 | 7.6 | 17,000 | Mars Pathfinder | (United States) NASA | (uncrewed) | 4 Jul 1997 | |
| Jupiter | Orbit insertion | 209,000 | 58 | 130,000 | Juno | (United States) NASA | (uncrewed) | 4 Jul 2016 | |
| Jupiter | Entry | 173,736 | 48.26 | 108,000 | Galileo | (United States) NASA | (uncrewed) | 21 Sep 2003 | |
| Saturn | Periapsis | 122,000 | 34 | 76,000 | Cassini | (United States) NASA | (uncrewed) | 27 Apr 2017 | |

== See also ==
- Orders of magnitude (speed)
