= Andy Green (RAF officer) =

British world land speed record holder (born 1962)

Wing Commander Andy Green OBE
- Born: Andrew Duncan Green; 30 July 1962 (age 64); Atherstone, Warwickshire, England
- Military career
- Allegiance: United Kingdom
- Branch: Royal Air Force
- Service years: 1980 – 2019
- Rank: Wing Commander
- Service number: 5203707F
- Awards: Officer of the Order of the British Empire

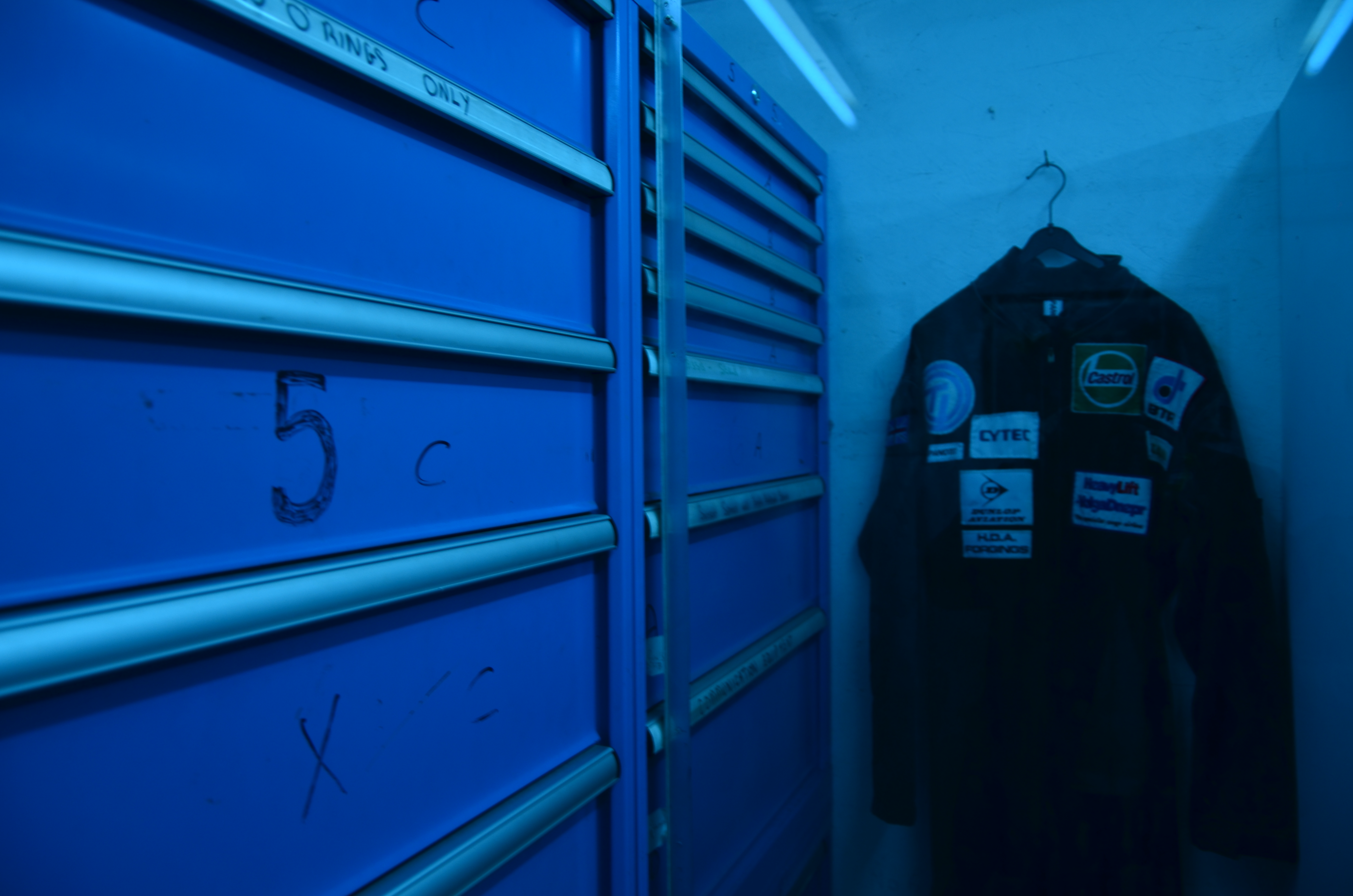
Suit of Andy Green

Wing Commander Andrew Duncan Green OBE (born 30 July 1962) is a retired British Royal Air Force fighter pilot and world land speed record holder since 1997, the first land speed record to break the sound barrier on four wheels.

== Early life ==
He was born in Atherstone, Warwickshire. Green's family moved to Hartlepool in the 1970s when his father was appointed chief fire officer of the local fire brigade. Green originally attended High Tunstall School before moving to Marske-by-the-Sea and beginning study at Bydales Comprehensive School. Green later moved to Kent with his family, where he studied at St. Olave's Grammar School in Orpington. While at a car show in Hartlepool at a young age, Green decided that he would be interested in a career within the military.

== RAF career ==
Green gained an RAF scholarship to Worcester College, Oxford, where he graduated in 1983 with first class honours in mathematics. He qualified as a fighter pilot on Phantom and Tornado interceptors. In 2003 Green was promoted to Wing Commander. He later became Officer Commanding Operations Wing at RAF Wittering near Peterborough. Green was the captain of the RAF team at the Cresta Run, where he used an experimental French toboggan and held the Inter-Services record for a number of years.

In his capacity as an RAF officer, he has served in West Germany, Iraq, Bosnia and Afghanistan.

== Speed records ==
=== Supersonic ===
Green is the current holder of the world land speed record, and the only person ever to break the sound barrier on land. On 25 September 1997 in ThrustSSC he beat the previous record in Black Rock Desert, US, reaching a speed of 714.144 miles per hour (1,149.303 km/h). On 15 October 1997, 50 years and 1 day after the sound barrier was broken in aerial flight by Chuck Yeager, Green reached 763.035 miles per hour (1,227.986 km/h), the first supersonic record (Mach 1.016). His call sign was "Dead Dog". As the vehicle exceeded the speed of sound it created a sonic boom.

Green was working on a new record attempt to break the 1,000 miles per hour (1,600 km/h) mark with Bloodhound LSR but stepped down from the driver position for the project in November 2023.

=== Road car ===
His next land speed attempt was intended to be for MG in a specially modified MG F called the MG EX255; however, due to the time required for modifications, the project did not finish on time and that attempt never happened.

=== Diesel power ===
In 2006 Green drove the JCB Dieselmax car, attempting to take the Diesel Land Speed Record over 300 mph (480 km/h). After testing the vehicle at RAF Wittering, on 22 August 2006, he broke the previous record of 236 miles per hour (380 km/h) (set in August 1973), after attaining an average speed of 328.767 miles per hour (529.099 km/h) during two runs on the Bonneville Salt Flats, Utah. Twenty four hours later, Green broke his own record, achieving a speed of 350.092 miles per hour (563.418 km/h) on 23 August 2006.

=== JCB Hydromax ===
In 2026, JCB announced a return to Bonneville with the JCB Hydromax. The streamliner vehicle is visually similar to Dieselmax, but powered by a hydrogen-fuelled version of the JCB444 engine. At Bonneville Speed Week on Thursday 6 August, Green drove Hydromax to a new SCTA record of 592.797 km/h (368.347 mph) in the AA/BGS (Blown Gas Streamliner) class.

Following Speed Week, JCB remained at Bonneville to attempt an FIA World Record in excess of 640 km/h (400 mph). On 11 August 2026, Green broke the official FIA land speed record for a hydrogen powered vehicle, attaining a speed of 406.320 miles per hour (653.909 km/h). This more than doubled the existing record of 301.95 km/h (187.62 mph), set by the BMW H2R in 2004.

== Honours and awards ==
Green was appointed an Officer of the Order of the British Empire in the 1998 New Year Honours. He was awarded the Segrave Trophy by the Royal Automobile Club in 1997. In 2006 he was awarded the John Cobb Trophy by the British Racing Drivers' Club for "a success of outstanding character" and an Honorary degree from Staffordshire University in July 2008.

== Racing experience ==
On 14 June 2009, Green gained his first circuit racing experience, whilst raising money for the Bloodhound SSC project, by participating in Round 4 of the Elise Trophy at Snetterton.

== See also ==
- List of vehicle speed records

Achievements
Preceded by Richard Noble	Land speed record holder 1997 – present	Incumbent
