= Ron Ayers =

English engineer (1932–2024)

Ronald Frederick Ayers MBE (11 April 1932 – 29 May 2024) was an English engineer who was responsible for the aerodynamics of the land speed record-holding vehicles, ThrustSSC and JCB Dieselmax, and was Chief Aerodynamicist for the Bloodhound SSC.

== Background ==
Born in Westminster, London, England, on 11 April 1932, Ayers developed an interest during the Blitz. Ayers obtained a BSc in aeronautical engineering from the University of London and an MSc in aerodynamics from Cranfield University before starting his working career as an apprentice at Handley Page Ltd, eventually working his way up to helping design prototypes of the Handley Page Victor bomber aircraft. After that he was employed by the British Aircraft Corporation (BAC) in their Guided Weapons Division, initially as Chief Aerodynamicist and then later Head of Operational Research and Deputy Head of Management Services. Much of his time at BAC was devoted to the development of the Bloodhound surface-to-air missile.

Ayers was a Chartered Engineer and a member of the Royal Aeronautical Society. He was appointed Member of the Order of the British Empire (MBE) in the 2014 New Year Honours for services to engineering.

Ayers died on 29 May 2024, at the age of 92.

== Land speed records ==
In retirement, while working as a volunteer at Brooklands Museum, Ayers found research papers from pre-World War II record-breaking attempts, and it sparked his interest in record-breaking. His involvement in the land speed record-breaking attempt came about through a chance meeting with Richard Noble in the offices of Ken Norris, the designer behind Donald Campbell's record-breaking Bluebird CN7. Through a combination of rocket sled testing at Pendine Sands and extensive computational fluid dynamics testing, Ayers was able to develop and refine a shape which would eventually go on to break the sound barrier.

Ayers was responsible for the design of the JCB Dieselmax which smashed the World Speed Record for diesel cars on 23 August 2006, clocking 350 mph. He was heavily involved in the design of the current land speed record attempt vehicle, the Bloodhound SSC.
