= El Mirage Lake =

Lake in the state of California, United States

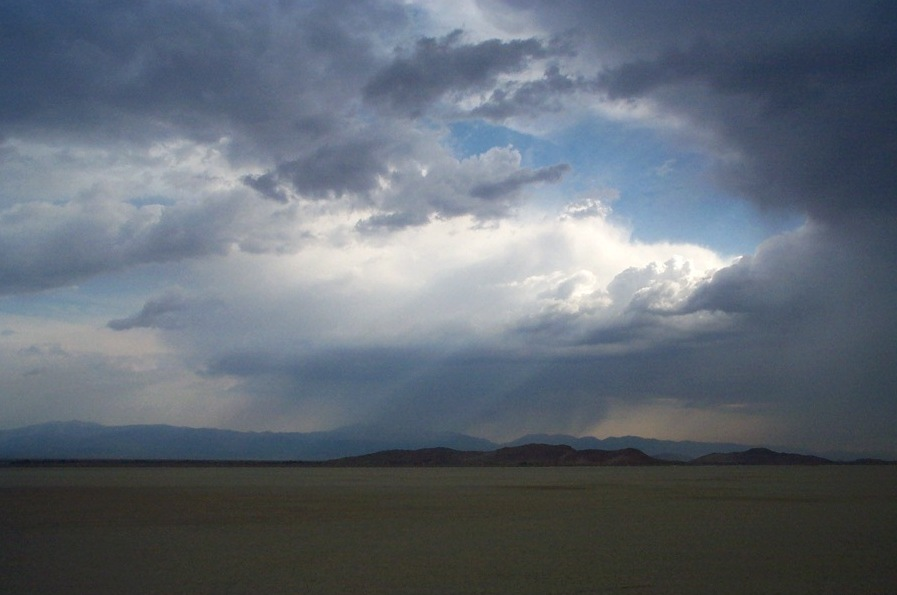

- Location within California Location within the United States
- Location: Mojave Desert, San Bernardino County, California
- Coordinates: 34.6470°N 117.60001°W
- Lake type: Endorheic basin
- Basin countries: United States
- Max. length: 10 km (6.2 mi)
- Max. width: 3 km (1.9 mi)
- Shore length^{1}: 25 km (16 mi)
- Surface elevation: 865 m (2,838 ft)
- References: U.S. Geological Survey Geographic Names Information System: El Mirage Lake
- ^{1} Shore length is not a well-defined measure.

El Mirage Lake is a dry lake bed in the northwestern Victor Valley of the central Mojave Desert, within San Bernardino County, California.

The lake is located about 9 miles (14 km) west-northwest of the town of Adelanto and 10 mi (16 km) north of Highway 18 in San Bernardino County.

The dry lake, at an elevation of 2,840 ft (870 m), is approximately 6 mi (9.7 km) long.

== El Mirage Off-Highway Vehicle Recreation Area (OHV) ==
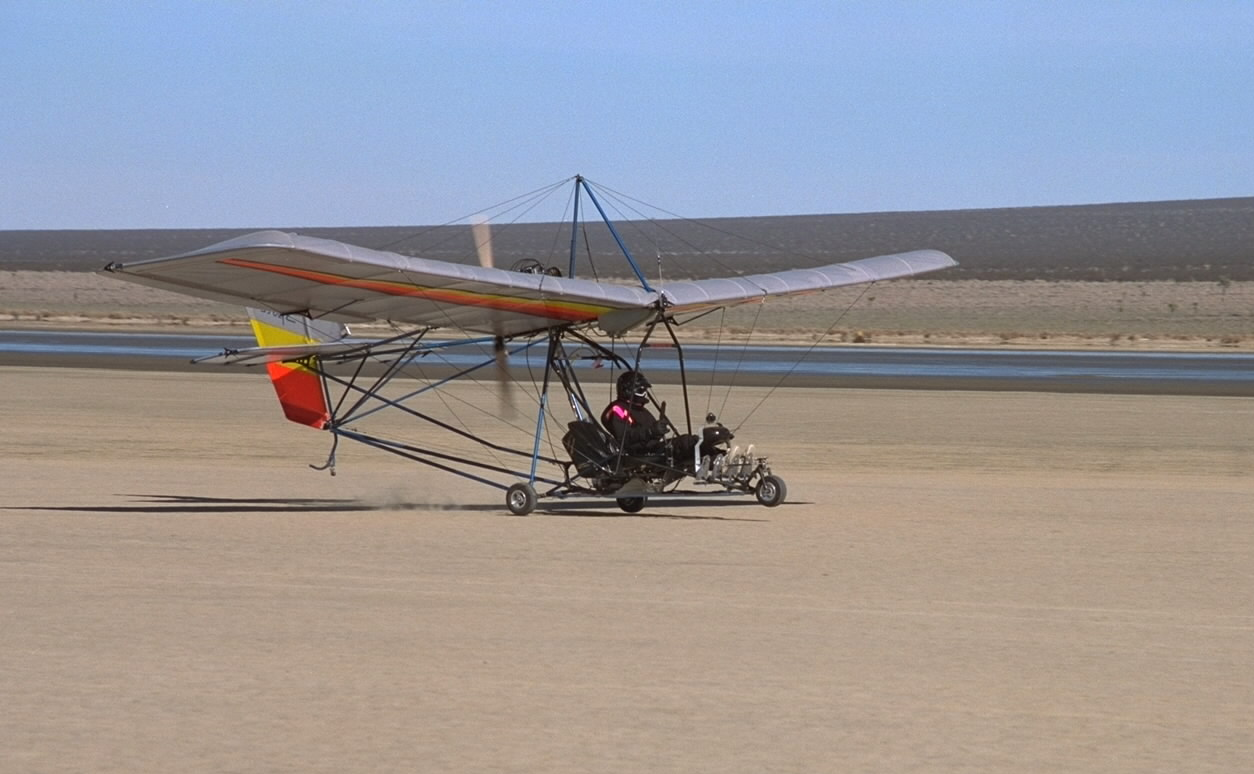
Ultralight aircraft at El Mirage Dry Lake

Formerly open to all visitors, it has been a popular spot for many activities ranging from gyrocopter and ultralight aircraft operations to automobile racing. The Bureau of Land Management has installed a fence to enclose the lake and some of the surrounding areas, and now charges fees for entry to what is now known as the El Mirage Off-Highway Vehicle (OHV) Recreation Area. It is a popular filming location for automobile commercials. Permits for the Recreation Area can be purchased on-site, at local retailers and online. Annual permits are $90, weekly permits are $30, and daily permits are $15. Private aircraft may still land on the lakebed.

For 50 years the lakebed has been used by the Southern California Timing Association for timed speed runs. The club also operates the Bonneville Salt Flats speed runs.

== Climate ==
El Mirage Lakebed experiences a desert climate, with cool winters and hot summers. Due to the lakebed's aridity and high elevation, the diurnal temperature variation is substantial. Though summer days can be very hot, summer nighttime temperatures are cool. The lakebed receives an occasional dusting of snow in the winter months, however, snowfall usually melts within 24 hours.

Climate data for El Mirage Lakebed, California
Month	Jan	Feb	Mar	Apr	May	Jun	Jul	Aug	Sep	Oct	Nov	Dec	Year
Record high °F (°C)	76 (24)	82 (28)	88 (31)	96 (36)	104 (40)	110 (43)	112 (44)	108 (42)	106 (41)	98 (37)	84 (29)	80 (27)	112 (44)
Mean daily maximum °F (°C)	56.8 (13.8)	60.5 (15.8)	65.4 (18.6)	72.1 (22.3)	80.9 (27.2)	91.1 (32.8)	97.7 (36.5)	96.3 (35.7)	89.3 (31.8)	77.8 (25.4)	65.2 (18.4)	56.9 (13.8)	75.8 (24.3)
Mean daily minimum °F (°C)	29.3 (−1.5)	32.4 (0.2)	36.4 (2.4)	40.0 (4.4)	47.7 (8.7)	55.0 (12.8)	60.3 (15.7)	59.0 (15.0)	53.5 (11.9)	43.9 (6.6)	34.2 (1.2)	27.9 (−2.3)	43.3 (6.3)
Record low °F (°C)	3 (−16)	5 (−15)	18 (−8)	23 (−5)	29 (−2)	32 (0)	41 (5)	41 (5)	33 (1)	14 (−10)	14 (−10)	1 (−17)	1 (−17)
Average precipitation inches (mm)	1.14 (29)	1.14 (29)	0.92 (23)	0.26 (6.6)	0.21 (5.3)	0.05 (1.3)	0.16 (4.1)	0.35 (8.9)	0.28 (7.1)	0.26 (6.6)	0.31 (7.9)	0.72 (18)	5.81 (148)
Average snowfall inches (cm)	0.8 (2.0)	0.3 (0.76)	0.2 (0.51)	0 (0)	0 (0)	0 (0)	0 (0)	0 (0)	0 (0)	0 (0)	0 (0)	0.7 (1.8)	1.9 (4.8)
Source: The Western Regional Climate Center

== See also ==
- El Mirage, California — adjacent to the lakebed.
- Endorheic lakes of California
- Lakes of the Mojave Desert
- List of lakes in California
