= Omer (submarine) =

Series of human-powered submarines

Omer is the name of a series of human-powered submarines. The submarines were built by students of the École de technologie supérieure (School of Higher Technology) in Montreal, Quebec, for the International Submarine Races. As of 2025, Omer teams hold the human-powered submarine world speed records for two-seater propeller, one-seater propeller and one-seater non-propeller categories. Those records are :

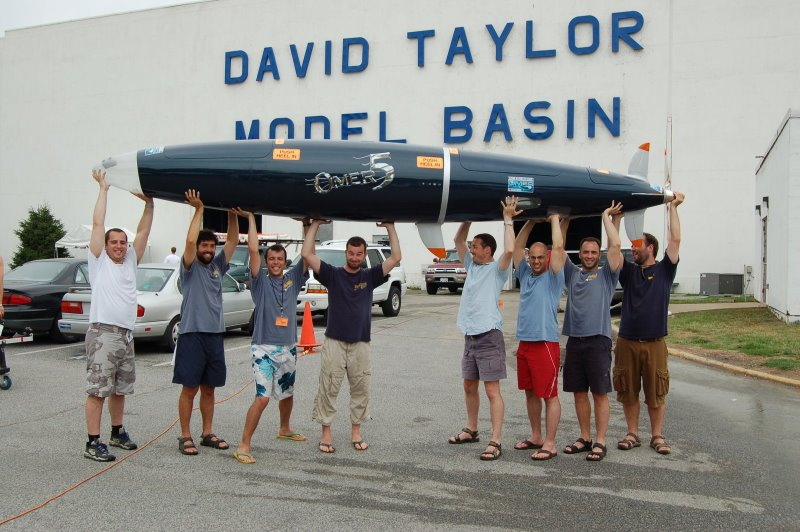
Omer 5 team - 2007

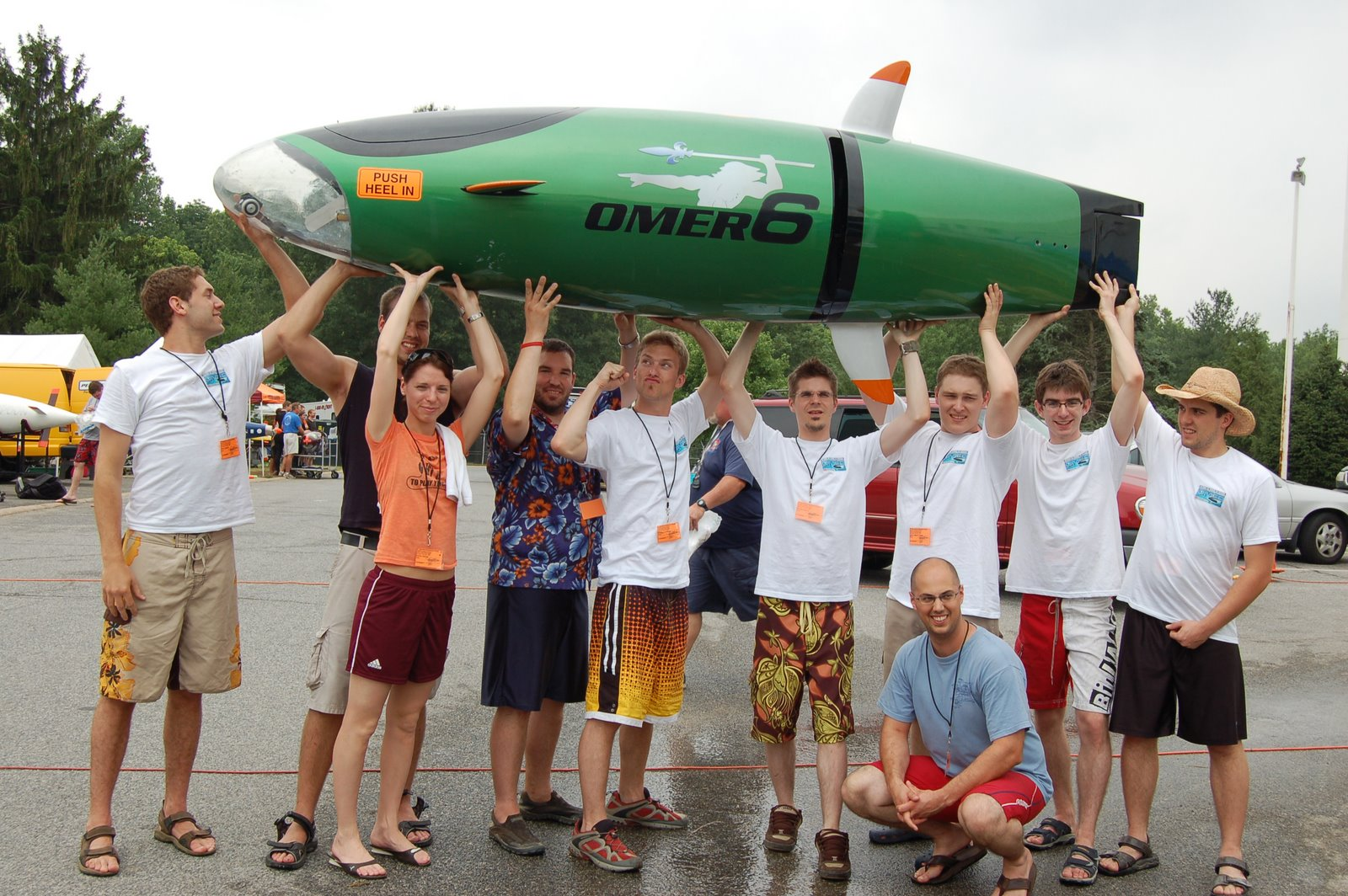
Omer 6 team - 2007

- 8.035 knots for Omer 5 (two-seater / propeller)
- 4.96 knots for Omer 11 (one-seater / non-propeller)
- 7.682 knots for Omer 13 (one-seater / propeller)

Omer 13 is the latest generation of Omer submarine.

== History ==
Since 1992, a group of students from the É.T.S. in electrical, mechanical, software and automated automation engineering have taken part in the completion of Omer, a human-powered submarine. The first generation of Omer was a two-seater submarine that made its mark around the world. Despite the students' efforts and with numerous prizes and awards in conception and innovation, Omer was not the world's fastest submarine. Otherwise, at the first presence of the Omer team, a variable pitch system was operational and gave good performances and helped the next Omer submarines to increase their speed.

In September 1995, the team decided that Omer would become the world's champion. With new members' ideas and older members' expertise, Omer 2 was born. In four months, a new hull was made and a new onboard computer was added to control the variable pitch from the propeller, and to give some information to the pilot as well.

Omer went to California for a competition in May 1996, where it won a world record in the two-seater category. With that victory in hand, the team decided to aim for first place in the one-seater category. Construction on Omer 3 began.

The team found success in Washington in June 1997, winning world record in all categories. In the summer of 2001, Omer 4 was set to beat the previous world record of 7.192 knots. Since then, a new electrical control system has been tested and integrated for the 2002 competition in California.

Since their creation, Omer, Omer 2 and Omer 3 had a lot of visibility in the media, and gained offers of help from individuals and corporations.

In the summer of 2003, Omer 5, the new two-seater submarine took first place again using the experience acquired from Omer 4. The new submarine is now much more stable than Omer 4. In 2005, it beat the world speed record for a two-seater submarine setting the mark at 7.061 knots.

In the summer of 2007, the submarine Omer 5 set the new world record reaching a speed of 8.035 knots. Omer 6 a submarine using non-propeller reach 4.642 knots, with its driver Nicolas Tardif, setting also a world record for non-propeller submarine.

== 2007 results ==
Carderock, Maryland, June 28, 2007 – Speed results by division in the 9th International Submarine Races held June 25–29 at the Naval Surface Warfare Center's Carderock Division David Taylor Model Basin in Bethesda, Maryland:

Two Person Propeller:

1. 8.035 knots, OMER 5, École de technologie supérieure, University of Quebec
2. 4.795 knots, F-A-U Boat, Florida Atlantic University
3. 4.775 knots, Drekar, Western Washington University
4. 4.043 knots, Sub Taxi, Independent

One Person Propeller:

1. 7.420 knots, Wasub V, Delft University of Technology
2. 6.473 knots, Archimede 4, École Polytechnique de Montreal
3. 5.022 knots, Maroon Harpoon, Texas A&M
4. 4.958 knots, Mercury, University of Michigan
5. 4.835 knots, Sublime, Hernando County Schools, Spring Hill, Florida
6. 3.771 knots, Phantom 5, Virginia Tech
7. 3.488 knots, Sea Wolf, Hernando County Schools
8. 2.343 knots, Dive Dawg, University of Washington
9. 2.262 knots, Swamp Thing, University of Florida
10. 1.694 knots, U-3.2, Sussex Technical High School, New Jersey
11. 1.285 knots, RSR Fourier, University of Maryland
12. 0.505 knots, Sea Car, Don Burton, Independent

One-Person, Non-Propeller:

1. 4.642 knots, OMER 6, École de technologie supérieure, University of Quebec
2. 2.092 knots, Sea Bomb, University of Bath, UK
3. 2.035 knots, Sebastion, University of California San Diego
4. 0.854 knots, Bogus Batoid, Bruce Plazyk, Independent
5. 0.499 knots, Battlin' Pete, U.S. Merchant Marine Academy
