= ThrustSSC =

Supersonic car

Thrust SSC
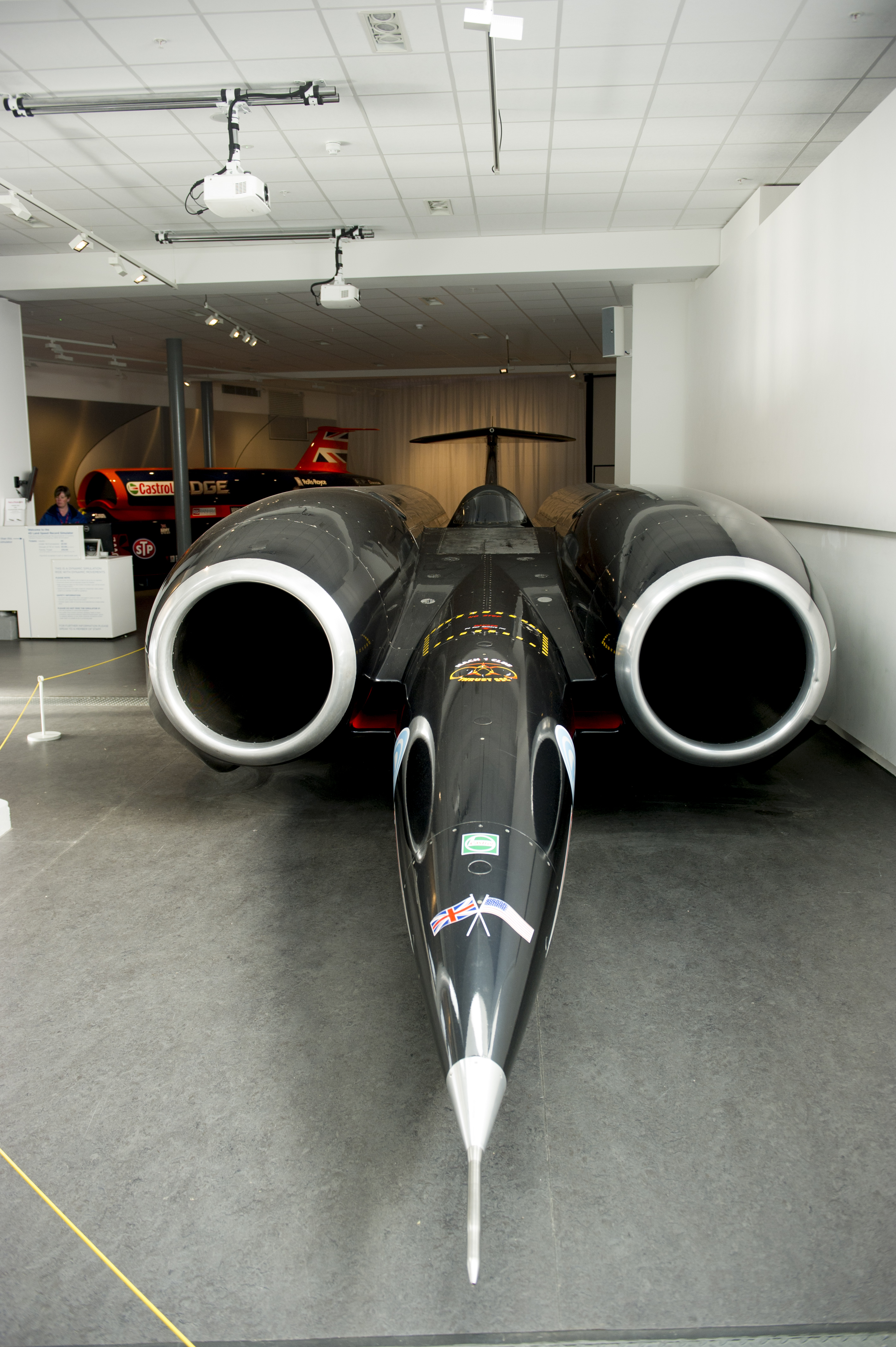
- Thrust SSC at the Coventry Transport Museum, where it is part of the permanent collection.

Overview
- Manufacturer: SSC Programme Limited
- Designer: Richard Noble, Glynne Bowsher, Ron Ayers, Jeremy Bliss and Reece Liebenberg

Body and chassis
- Class: Land Speed Record vehicle

Powertrain
- Engine: two Rolls-Royce Spey turbofan:- Rolls-Royce Spey 202

Dimensions
- Length: 16.5 m (54 ft)
- Width: 3.7 m (12 ft)
- Kerb weight: 10.6 tonnes

Chronology
- Predecessor: Thrust2
- Successor: Bloodhound LSR (planned)

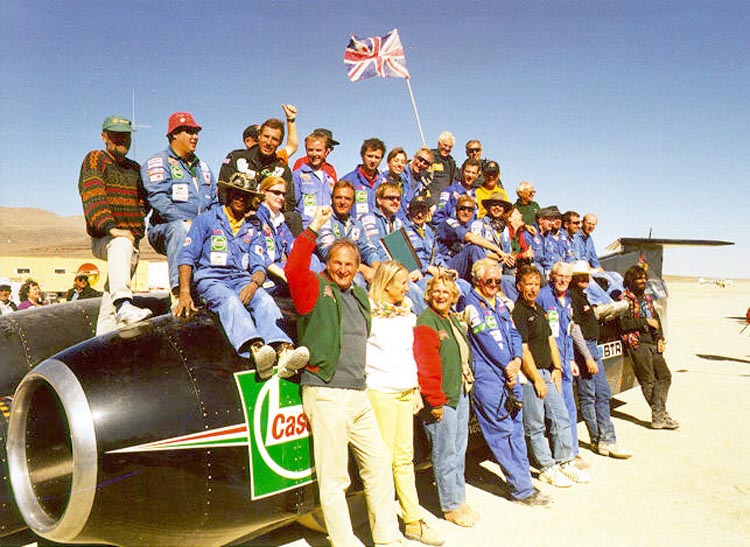
The team with ThrustSSC

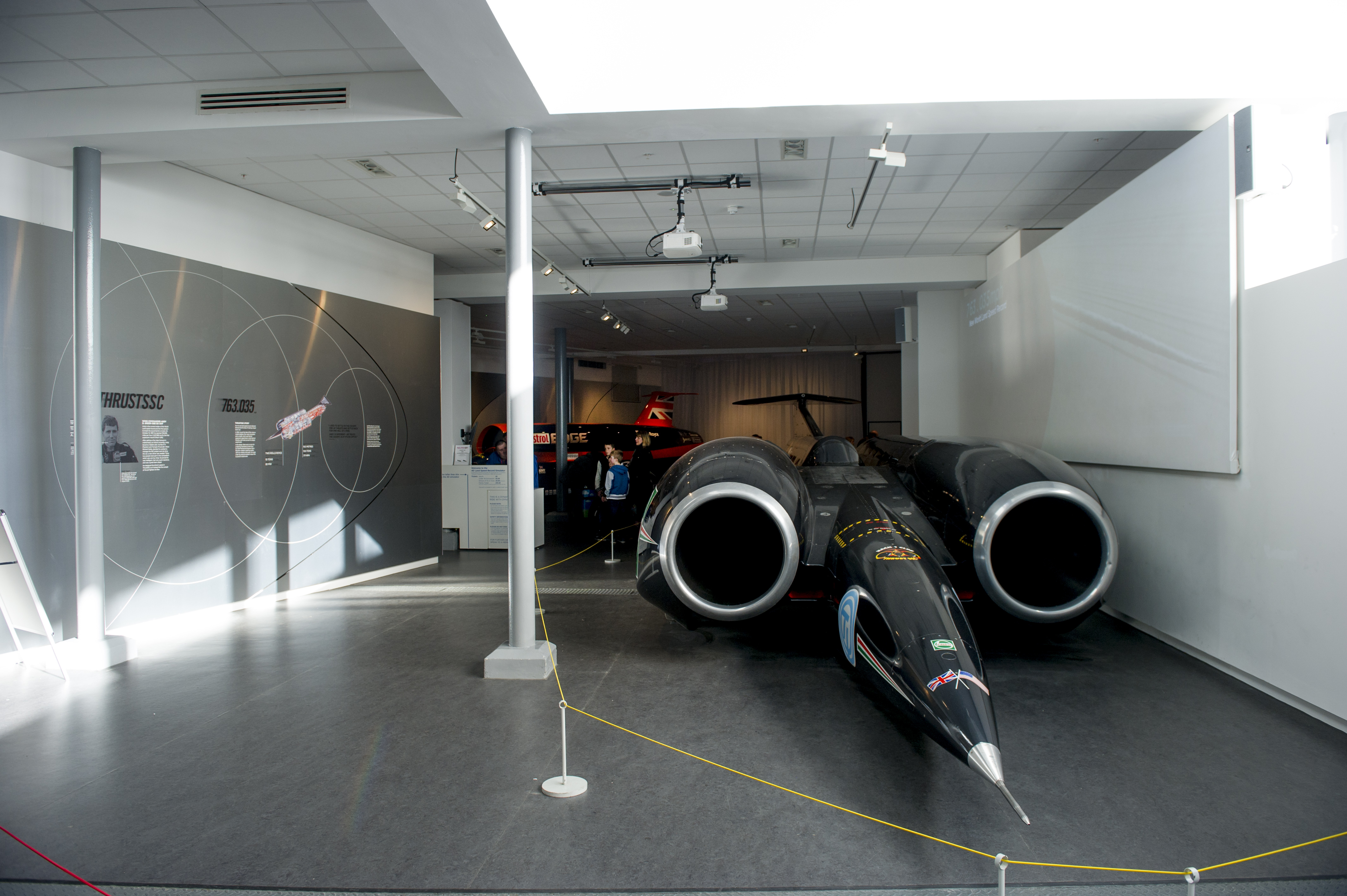
ThrustSSC on display in the Coventry Transport Museum's Landspeed Gallery

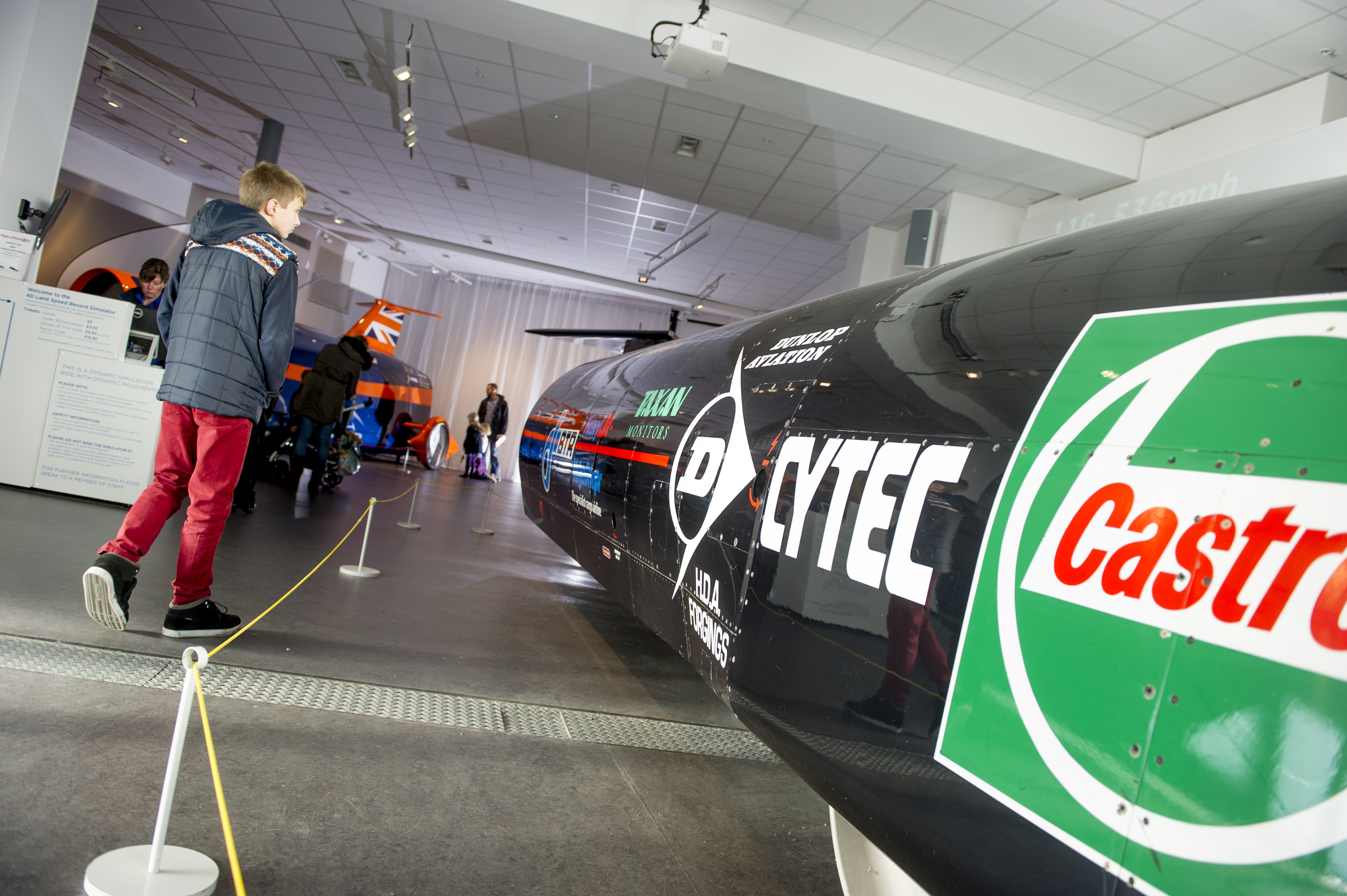
Side view of Thrust SSC showing its branding and marks at Coventry Transport Museum

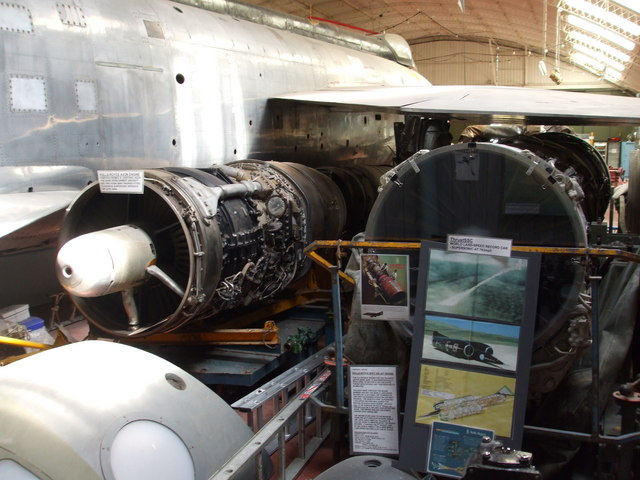
One of the Rolls-Royce engines in the Norfolk and Suffolk Aviation Museum

ThrustSSC, Thrust SSC or Thrust SuperSonic Car is a British jet car developed by Richard Noble, Glynne Bowsher, Ron Ayers, and Jeremy Bliss. Thrust SSC holds the world land speed record, set on 15 October 1997, and piloted by Andy Green, when it achieved a speed of 1,228 km/h (763 mph) and it became the first and only land vehicle to officially break the sound barrier. It was developed in Coventry.

Alongside Thrust2, Thrust SSC was displayed in the "Spirit of Speed Gallery" of the Coventry Transport Museum in Coventry, England. As part of the Museum's redevelopment project both cars were relocated by specialist haulier to the new Biffa Award Land Speed Record Gallery which opened in 2015.

The car is 16.50 m (54.1 ft) long and 3.7 m (12 ft) wide and has a kerb weight of 10.6 tons. It had a reported thrust of 223 kN (approximately 50,000 pounds force) at some operating conditions. Jet engines are not designed to operate at peak airspeed while still in ground effect; a proper estimate would need to take this into account.

== Details ==
The jet was driven by Royal Air Force fighter pilot Wing Commander Andy Green in the Black Rock Desert in the US state of Nevada. It was powered by two afterburning Rolls-Royce Spey turbofan engines, as used in the British version of the F-4 Phantom II jet fighter. The twin engines developed a net thrust of 223 kN (50,000 lbf) at the measured record speed of 341 metres per second, burning around 18 litres/second (4.0 Imperial gallons/s or 4.8 US gallons/s) of fuel. This was about 4,850 L/100 km (0.06 mpg_{‑imp}; 0.05 mpg_{‑US}).

After the record was set, the World Motor Sport Council released the following message:

The World Motor Sport Council homologated the new world land speed records set by the team ThrustSSC of Richard Noble, driver Andy Green, on 15 October 1997 at Black Rock Desert, Nevada (USA). This is the first time in history that a land vehicle has exceeded the speed of sound. The new records are as follows:
- Flying mile 1,227.985 km/h (763.035 mph)
- Flying kilometre 1,223.657 km/h (760.345 mph)
In setting the record, the sound barrier was broken in both the north and south runs.

Paris, 11 November 1997.

== Legacy ==
In 1983 Richard Noble had broken the world land speed record with his earlier car Thrust2, which reached a speed of 1,019 km/h (633 mph). The date of Andy Green's record came 50 years and one day after Chuck Yeager broke the sound barrier in Earth's atmosphere, with the Bell X-1 research rocket plane on 14 October 1947.

Both Thrust SSC and Thrust2 are displayed at the Coventry Transport Museum in Coventry, England. Visitors can ride a 4D motion simulator depicting a computer-generated animation of the record-breaking run from the perspective of Green.

Several teams are competing to break the record, including the Bloodhound LSR project, launched in 2008, and previously the North American Eagle Project, from 2004 until the project's abandonment after a fatal crash in 2019.

== Richard Noble's Orange–Intel dispute ==
In June 2012, a television advertisement for the Orange San Diego mobile phone, containing an Intel processor, was broadcast on British television and featured a fast car in computer-generated imagery. Richard Noble claimed that the car was a representation of Thrust SSC and thus these companies had used his intellectual property without permission, putting the future of the Bloodhound LSR project in doubt. The Advertising Standards Authority rejected the Bloodhound team's complaint, claiming that intellectual property disputes were not in its remit. According to BBC News technology correspondent Rory Cellan-Jones, Intel and Orange responded that their production team had researched different styles of "superfast vehicles" and developed their own Orange-branded landspeed car, and that the advertisement and phone were not connected to Noble or Bloodhound LSR.

== See also ==
- Air speed record
- Budweiser Rocket
- List of vehicle speed records
- RAF High Speed Flight
- Rocket car

== Notes ==
Achievements
Preceded by ThrustSSC; 713.990 MPH, 1,149.055 Km/h set by Andy Green, on 25 September 1997.	FIA Outright World Land Speed Record holder (1 km); 760.343 MPH, 1,223.657 Km/h set by Andy Green, on 15 October 1997.	Succeeded by Incumbent
Preceded by ThrustSSC; 714.144 MPH, 1,149.303 Km/h set by Andy Green, on 25 September 1997.	FIA Outright World Land Speed Record holder (1 mile); 763.035 MPH, 1,227.985 Km/h set by Andy Green, on 15 October 1997.	Succeeded by Incumbent
