= Southern California Timing Association =

US auto racing sanctioning organisation

Southern California Timing Association (SCTA) is a competition sanctioning body that maintains rules and record for Land Speed Racing events held at El Mirage Dry Lake, California and at the Bonneville Salt Flats, Utah. It is a non-profit, volunteer organization made up of eleven separate car clubs.

SCTA has been in existence since its first meeting on November 29, 1937 and is considered to be the oldest operating racing organization in the United States. At that first meet between five and seven local car clubs met to organize lake bed races and to establish a set of guidelines to make dry lake land speed trials safer. Since its creation the SCTA in conjunction with its sister organization the Bonneville Nationals Inc. (BNI) have organized, sanctioned and recorded hundreds of meets and thousands of records.

The organization holds two meets each year on the Bonneville Salt Flats in Utah. Speed Week is held in August and World Finals in October. The SCTA also holds six events at El Mirage Dry Lake in Southern California. It is responsible for ensuring compliance with BLM standards for use of public lands, safety regulations for competitors and spectators, technical inspection of race vehicles, timing recording of record attempts and maintaining a list of current class records as well as history of prior record holders.

The organization is governed by a board of directors that is made up of five elected members consisting of president, vice president, secretary, treasurer and sergeant at arms. The balance of the board, up to 17 total members, are appointed by the elected board members. Elected board members serve a one-year term and may be elected to one additional year. Thereafter an elected board member is not allowed to seek the same office for at least one year. Appointed board members have no term limits. The SCTA elected board is also responsible for appointing the BNI Board that consists of a minimum of three members. The BNI Board oversees the organization of the two events at the Bonneville Salt Flats. Operation of the meets are transferred to the SCTA following the driver's meeting on the first day of each meet.
