= Lambky Liner =

- Manufacturer: Max Lambky
- Assembly: c. 1990–2012 (12 redesigns)
- Class: Speed record streamliner motorcycle
- Engine: Two, c. 1,000 cc supercharged Vincent Motorcycles pushrod V-twin engines Alcohol fuel
- Top speed: 250–275 mph (402–443 km/h)
- Brakes: Parachute assist
- Weight: 1,600 pounds (730 kg) with rider and fuel (wet)

The Lambky Liner is a motorcycle land-speed record streamliner designed by Navy veteran and Vincent motorcycle restorer Max Lambky from Kansas, United States. It reached a top recorded speed of 250 mph (400 km/h) at the 2007 International Motorcycle Speed Trials, and an estimated 275 mph (443 km/h) in second gear before a supercharger spindle broke and spoiled a run in 2008.

== Design and construction ==
World record holder Don Vesco consulted with Lambky on several features of streamliner design that Lambky utilized, including hub-center steering.

The streamliner is powered by dual alcohol-burning supercharged Vincent Motorcycles pushrod V-twin engines, built in 1949 and 1952. The total displacement is almost 2,000 cc running on alcohol, developing c. 400 horsepower (300 kW).

Total weight with rider and fuel is 1,600 pounds (730 kg). Frontal area is 4 square feet (0.37 m^{2}).

As of 2012, nine iterations of the streamliner had been built by Lambky, including a sidecar configuration. Development costs were reported as $100,000 in 1997, and over $150,000 by 2008.

== Riders ==
Riders included Don Angel, the first, who was recorded going 150 mph (240 km/h) through the timing lights backwards in 2006, and Hartmut Weidelich, a German who also rebuilt the engines.

== Records ==
The streamliner won an award at the 2005 Speed Trials by BUB at Bonneville Speedway in the antique division at 212.86 miles per hour (342.56 km/h).

In September, 2010, it set a new Southern California Timing Association (SCTA) record of 191.303 miles per hour (307.872 km/h) in the SCS-PBF class; SCS stands for special construction (hub steering, two engine) streamliner; PBF stands for piston, blown, (alcohol/nitro) fuel.
