= Ack Attack =

- Also called: Top 1 Ack Attack
- Class: Land-speed record streamliner
- Engine: 2× turbocharged 1,299 cc (79.3 cu in) inline-four
- Top speed: 634.217 km/h (394.084 mph)
- Power: Over 1,000 hp (750 kW)
- Transmission: Dual water-cooled drivechains (left and right)
- Frame type: Tubular steel
- Wheelbase: 12 ft (3.7 m)
- Dimensions: L: 20.5 feet (6.2 m); H: 32 in (810 mm)
- Weight: 1,617 lb (733 kg) (dry); 2,000 lb (910 kg) (including rider) (wet)
- Fuel capacity: 4.7 US gallons (18 L; 3.9 imp gal)

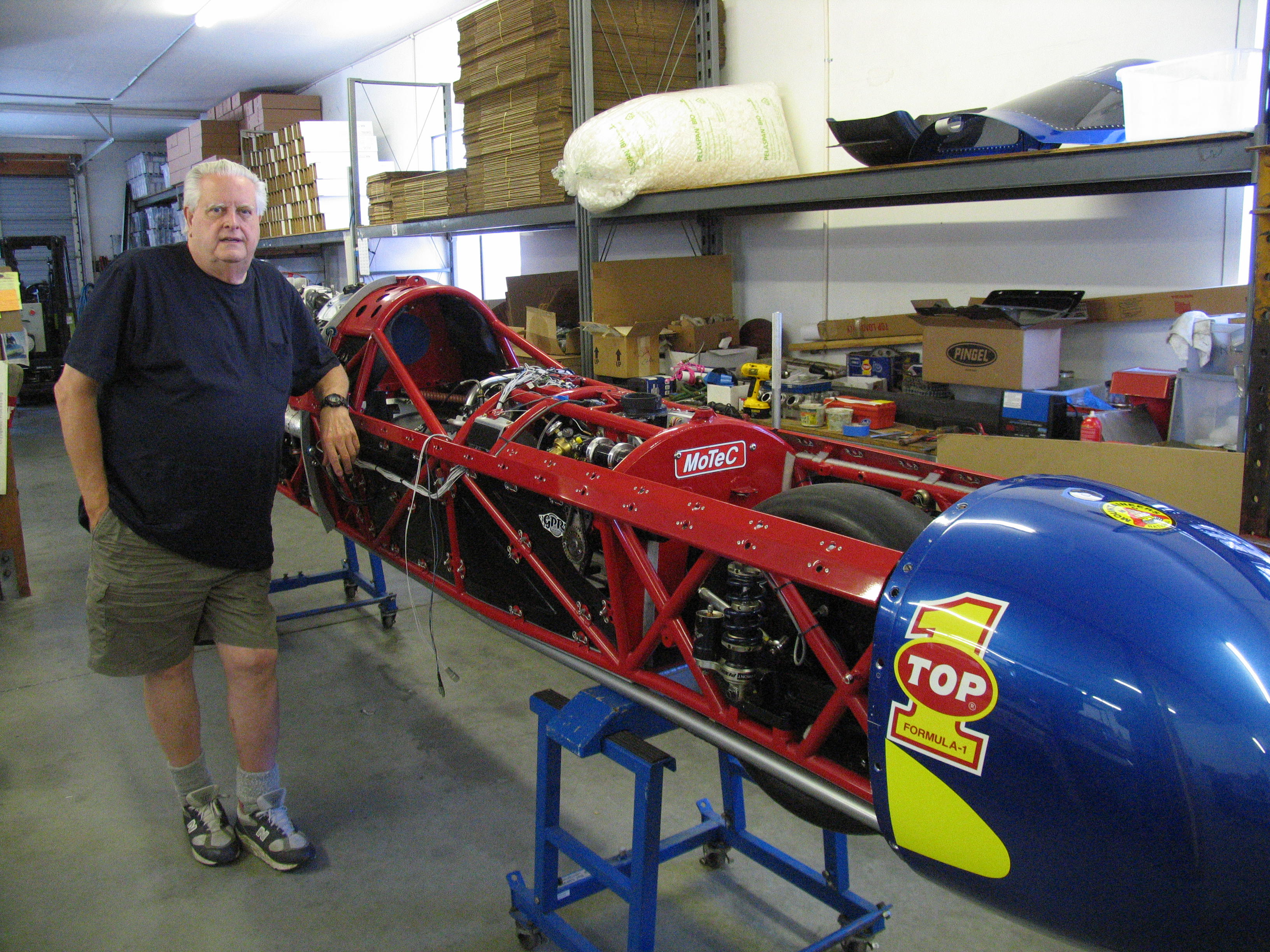
Mike Akatiff with the Top 1 Ack Attack

The TOP 1 Ack Attack is a specially constructed land-speed record streamliner motorcycle that, as of March 2013, has held the record for world's fastest motorcycle since recording a two-way average speed of 605.697 km/h (376.363 mph) on September 25, 2010, in the Cook Motorsports Top Speed Shootout at Bonneville Speedway, Utah. The Ack Attack's fastest one-way speed was officially recorded at 634.217 km/h (394.084 mph). This was the third time in four years the Ack Attack had broken the motorcycle land-speed record.

The record was confirmed and certified by the Federation Internationale de Motocyclisme (FIM), which is the world's leading regulatory authority for motorcycle racing. The Ack Attack's record was included in the 2012 Guinness World Records.

Designed and built from the ground up by Mike Akatiff, the Ack Attack's bullet-shaped chassis is made from chromoly tubing. The motorcycle streamliner is powered by two 1,299 cc (79.3 cu in) Suzuki Hayabusa engines, using a single Garrett turbocharger, intercooled with dry ice at 35 pounds per square inch (240 kPa) boost, which produce more than 900 horsepower (671.1 kW), and runs on Mickey Thompson tires. While pursuing the land-speed record, the Ack Attack experienced a number of failed attempts, including runs which ended in spectacular crashes.

== History ==
The first land-speed record for a motorcycle was unofficially set in the early 1900s by Glenn Curtiss in Yonkers, New York. His recorded speed was 64 mph (103 km/h). Curtiss continued to push the limits of speed at the time, and by 1907 he had more than doubled his own record, setting a new mark of 136.27 mph (219.31 km/h). This record stood for more than 20 years.

It was not until 1930, in Arpajon, France, that Curtiss's record was officially eclipsed when Joseph S. Wright rode 137.23 mph (220.85 km/h) on his motorcycle.

From the 1930s through the mid-1950s a number of motorcycle riders pushed their motorcycles to set new land-speed records at different locations (mostly in Europe). By 1956, when riders began to near, and ultimately exceed, the 200-mph mark, the record-setting attempts were taking place at the Bonneville Salt Flats in Utah.

Bonneville has remained the location for record-breaking attempts to this day. A number of motorcycles have taken advantage of the area's fast conditions to push the land-speed record higher and higher. In 1975, Don Vesco became the first rider to set a record exceeding 300 mph (480 km/h) on his Yamaha motorcycle.

Between 2006 and 2010, the TOP 1 Ack Attack and the BUB Seven streamliner have gone back and forth with the motorcycle land-speed record on five occasions. The current mark, recorded in the 2012 edition of the Guinness World Records, stands at 376.363 mph (605.698 km/h), set by the Ack Attack on September 25, 2010.

In August 2017, Mike Akatiff brought the Ack Attack to the largest salt flats in the world at Salar de Uyuni, Bolivia to attempt another record-breaking run and achieve the team's goal of becoming the first motorcycle to break the 400-mph barrier. While the team didn't set the record on this attempt, they intend to return to Bolivia in the future for another run at 400 mph and beyond.

== Attempts and crashes ==
September 2004 – At the International Speed Trials by BUB, the Ack Attack, ridden by Jimmy Odom, was hit by a crosswind while pushing 300 mph (480 km/h). Odom was uninjured when the motorcycle streamliner crashed in the high-speed wipeout.

February 2006 – The Ack Attack team traveled to the Lake Gairdner area in Australia in an attempt to break the motorcycle land-speed record. With a traveling crew of 23 people, including riders Sam Wheeler and John Noonan, the team arrived at the salt flats near Lake Gairdner only to discover that the conditions were not conducive to breaking the record. The area had been hit by a huge thunderstorm the week before the team arrived. Since they had traveled so far, the team tried a run, but the poor conditions only allowed for the Ack Attack to reach a top speed of 249 mph (401 km/h).

September 2006 – On September 3, 2006, the TOP 1 Ack Attack, ridden by Rocky Robinson, broke the motorcycle land-speed record at the Bonneville Salt Flats. Conditions were perfect on the salt, and the motorcycle reached a top speed of 342.797 mph (551.678 km/h), approximately 20 mph (32 km/h) faster than the previous record, which had stood since July 1990. The Ack Attack's record was short-lived however. On September 5, 2006, just two days after the Ack Attack's historic run, the record was broken by the BUB Lucky 7 streamliner ridden by Chris Carr at 350.884 mph (564.693 km/h).

September 2007 – Again at the International Speed Trials by BUB, Rocky Robinson rode the Ack Attack through the measured mile in pursuit of reclaiming the motorcycle land-speed record. At the end of the run, at speeds in excess of 320 mph (510 km/h), Robinson lost control of the bike, crashed, and rolled 16 times.

September 2008 – Back again at Bonneville, the Ack Attack broke the motorcycle land-speed record for the second time. Again ridden by Rocky Robinson, the streamliner set a world-record mark of 360.913 mph (580.833 km/h).

September 2010 – The BUB Lucky 7 again reclaimed the motorcycle land-speed record at Bonneville in 2009. Then, on September 25, 2010, the Ack Attack, for the third time in four years, set a new world's record at Bonneville by traveling 376.363 mph (605.698 km/h). Once again, Rocky Robinson was in the rider's seat for another run to reclaim the title.

== Mike Akatiff ==
Mike Akatiff is the owner of Ack Technologies, an avionics company, and is a motorcycle racer, machinist, mechanic, and parts builder. Akatiff first became interested in setting the motorcycle land-speed record in 2002. He dedicated a large portion of his company facility in Northern California to designing and constructing the Ack Attack, and assembled a team of old friends to help build the motorcycle.

== See also ==
- Motorcycle land-speed record
- BUB Seven Streamliner
