= New Hudson Motorcycles =

British motorcycle manufacturer

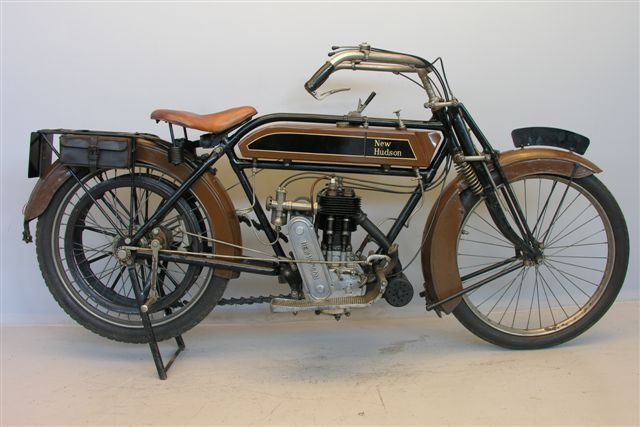
- Industry: Manufacturing and engineering
- Founded: 1903
- Defunct: 1957
- Fate: Taken over by BSA after the Second World War
- Headquarters: Birmingham, UK
- Key people: George Patterson
- Products: Motorcycles

New Hudson Motorcycles was a British motorcycle manufacturer. Founded in 1903 by George Patterson in Birmingham, their first motorcycle was produced in 1902 but was unsuccessful. The New Hudson range expanded between 1910 and 1915 using JAP engines, then the factory joined the war effort until 1919. As well as side-valve and OHV single-cylinder engines of 350 to 600 cc, they also built a 211 cc two-stroke and a number of three-wheelers with MAG engines. In 1927 Bert le Vack broke the 100 miles per hour (160 km/h) record at Brooklands on a 500 cc New Hudson.

The firm stopped motorcycle production in 1932 and changed their name to Girling Ltd – which still exists as a brake-component company. Bikes were made under the New Hudson name after the Second World War, when they became a subsidiary of Birmingham Small Arms Company (BSA) and manufactured successful autocycles until 1957.

== Models ==
Model	Year	Notes
293cc aiv	1911	
Model 3B 500cc	1912	31/2 HP single-cylinder engine
500cc 'Touring'	1914	
'Big Six'	1916	
220cc	1922	Two-stroke
500cc Type E	1924	
350cc	1926	Twin-port
346cc OHV	1927	
Brooklands 500cc	1929	MSO dry sump engine
596cc SV	1929	
350 SV	1931	
350 OHV	1931	
493 SV	1931	
350 OHV 'Tourist'	1932	Three-speed
493 OHV	1932	
550 SV	1932	
Bronze Wing	1933	500 cc
Autocycle	1940	Villiers JDL engine
Autocycle	1950	98 cc

== See also ==
- List of motorcycles of the 1910s
- List of motorcycles of the 1920s
