= Owen Baldwin =

British World War I flying ace

Owen Morgan Baldwin
- Born: 21 February 1893; Twyford, Berkshire, England
- Died: 12 January 1942 (aged 48); Berkshire, England
- Military career
- Allegiance: United Kingdom
- Branch: Royal Air Force
- Rank: Captain
- Unit: No. 73 Squadron RAF
- Conflicts: World War I World War II
- Awards: Distinguished Flying Cross and Bar; Legion d'Honneur (France); Croix de Guerre with palm (France)
- Other work: Motorcycle racer

Captain Owen Morgan Baldwin DFC* (21 February 1893 – 12 January 1942) was a British World War I flying ace credited with 16 aerial victories. Post-war he was a successful professional motorcycle racer, and for a time holder of the official motorcycle land-speed record.

== World War I ==
Baldwin was a mechanical engineer in civilian life. He joined No. 73 Squadron RAF, which was tasked with ground support missions, and became a flight leader as well as the squadron's leading ace. His most notable day in action was 15 September 1918, when he scored five victories by destroying two German Fokker D.VIIs and an observation plane, and driving down two more D.VIIs out of control. His victory roll is notable for having only three "soft" victories scored by driving an enemy down instead of destroying him.

Baldwin was confirmed in rank as a Flying Officer, effective 7 March 1925. He was also in service during World War II; he was commissioned a Flying Officer in the RAF Reserve on 12 December 1939.

== Honours and awards ==
Distinguished Flying Cross

Lieutenant Owen Morgan Baldwin.
A gallant and skilful pilot who has on many occasions attacked troops and transport at low altitudes. Recently he encountered twelve enemy aeroplanes, two of which he crashed. He has, in addition, accounted for five other machines, showing at all times fearlessness and resource.

Bar to the Distinguished Flying Cross
Lieutenant (Acting-Captain) Owen Morgan Baldwin, DFC.
A gallant and determined officer, conspicuous for his skill and daring in attack. Since he was awarded the Distinguished Flying Cross he has destroyed six enemy aircraft and driven down two out of control, accounting for four in one day. In all he has to his credit thirteen machines destroyed and three driven down out of control.

== Motorcycle racer ==
Post-war Baldwin became one of the first professional motorcycle racers. He competed twice in the Isle of Man TT Senior Race, riding a Martin in 1921, but failing to finish, and riding a Rudge in 1922 and coming 14th. He eventually found fame riding a Zenith V twin at Brooklands, competing in solo and sidecar races ranging from a single lap to 500 miles. He also competed in hillclimbing events, setting a record time at the Kop Hill event in Princes Risborough on a Matchless-MAG in 1923, and coming second in 1925. He was awarded the Brooklands Gold Star Medal for completing a lap at an average speed over 100 mph (160 km/h) in 1927, and competed in the Brooklands 200 mile race four times between 1925 and 1929, winning once, and coming third three times. Baldwin's greatest achievement came at Arpajon in 1928 when riding his Zenith-JAP he became the first man to ride a measured kilometre at an average speed of over 200 km/h (120 mph), taking the official FIM motorcycle land-speed record.

In 1923 Baldwin entered into a partnership with Edward Alexander Burney of Burney & Blackburne to form to the company Burney, Baldwin & Co. Ltd. The company manufactured high-quality motorcycles, but was wound up in 1927.
