= Wilhelm Herz =

German motorcycle racer

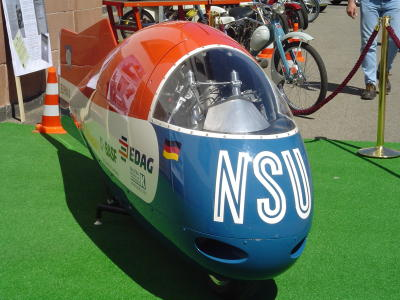
NSU Delphin III replica

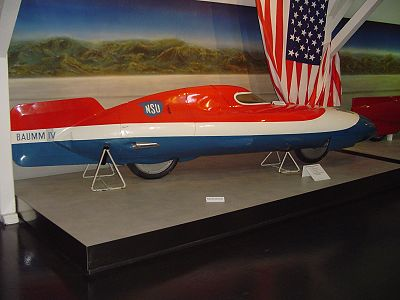
Fliegender Liegestuhl Baumm IV

Wilhelm Herz (18 January 1912 – 5 January 1998) was a German professional motorcycle racer and land speed racer. After his motorcycle racing career, he became the manager for the Hockenheimring circuit.

== Motorcycle racing career ==
Herz was born in Lampertheim, Grand Duchy of Hesse. He started his career in 1932 with DKW and went over to NSU in 1939. He raced on national and international courses like the Berlin AVUS, Grenzlandring, Eläintarhan ajot in Helsinki, Hockenheimring, Sachsenring in Hohenstein-Ernstthal, Isle of Man, Monza, Nürburgring, Schleizer Dreieck, Schottenring and Solitude Racetrack. He gained his international reputation through numerous world records on two and four-wheeled vehicles. He set a motorcycle record in 1951 on the Munich - Ingolstadt motorway and repeated it at Bonneville Speedway, Utah in 1956. In this instance, he was the first person to ride a motorbike over 200 mph (320 km/h).

From 1954 until 1992, Herz was manager of the Hockenheimring which he led to international prominence, especially after the Nürburgring was declared too dangerous for international motorsport, as it hosted both the MotoGP and Formula One rounds in Germany at the time, and also became Germany's premier drag strip after one was built in the section between the stadium section. Wilhelm Herz was honoured for his merits in the field of motorsports by former German President Theodor Heuss who presented him the Silbernes Lorbeerblatt in 1952 and in 1972 he received the Order of Merit of the Federal Republic of Germany by President Gustav Heinemann. The city of Hockenheim honoured his merits concerning the Hockenheimring by presenting him with the Goldene Verdienstmedaille.

In 2006 Heinz Herz, son of Wilhelm Herz, was presented by BUB Enterprises (maker of BUB Seven streamliner) with a replica of the Delphin III, to celebrate the 50th anniversary of the world record 1956 in the course of the International Motorcycle Speed Trials, sanctioned by the FIM and the AMA, on the Bonneville Salt Flats.
