= Lightning Bolt (motorcycle) =

- Manufacturer: Don Vesco
- Predecessor: Silver Bird (streamliner)
- Class: Streamliner
- Engine: 2×inline-4, twin turbo, 2,032 cc total displacement
- Top speed: c. 333 miles per hour (536 km/h)

Lightning Bolt is an American-built streamliner motorcycle that held the motorcycle land-speed record from 1978, when Don Vesco rode it to 318.598 miles per hour (512.734 km/h), until 1990. It was also the fastest vehicle participating in the 1978 Bonneville Speed Week with a one-way 333.117-mile-per-hour (536.100 km/h) run. It was powered by twin turbocharged inline-4 engines sourced from a Kawasaki Kz1000, with a combined displacement of 2,032 cc. The near-stock engines were linked at both ends of their cranks by two Gilmer belts and utilized the rear engine's gearbox.

Lightning Bolt was apparently succeeded by another streamliner based on two turbocharged six-cylinder Kawasaki motors (probably from the early-1980s Kawasaki Z1300) that did not set records. Vesco turned his attention to automobile land speed racing in the 1990s with a six-wheel car called "Skytracker" that Vesco described as a "cross between a car and a motorcycle", then his final vehicle, the land speed record-setting #111 Turbinator.
