= NSU Delphin III =

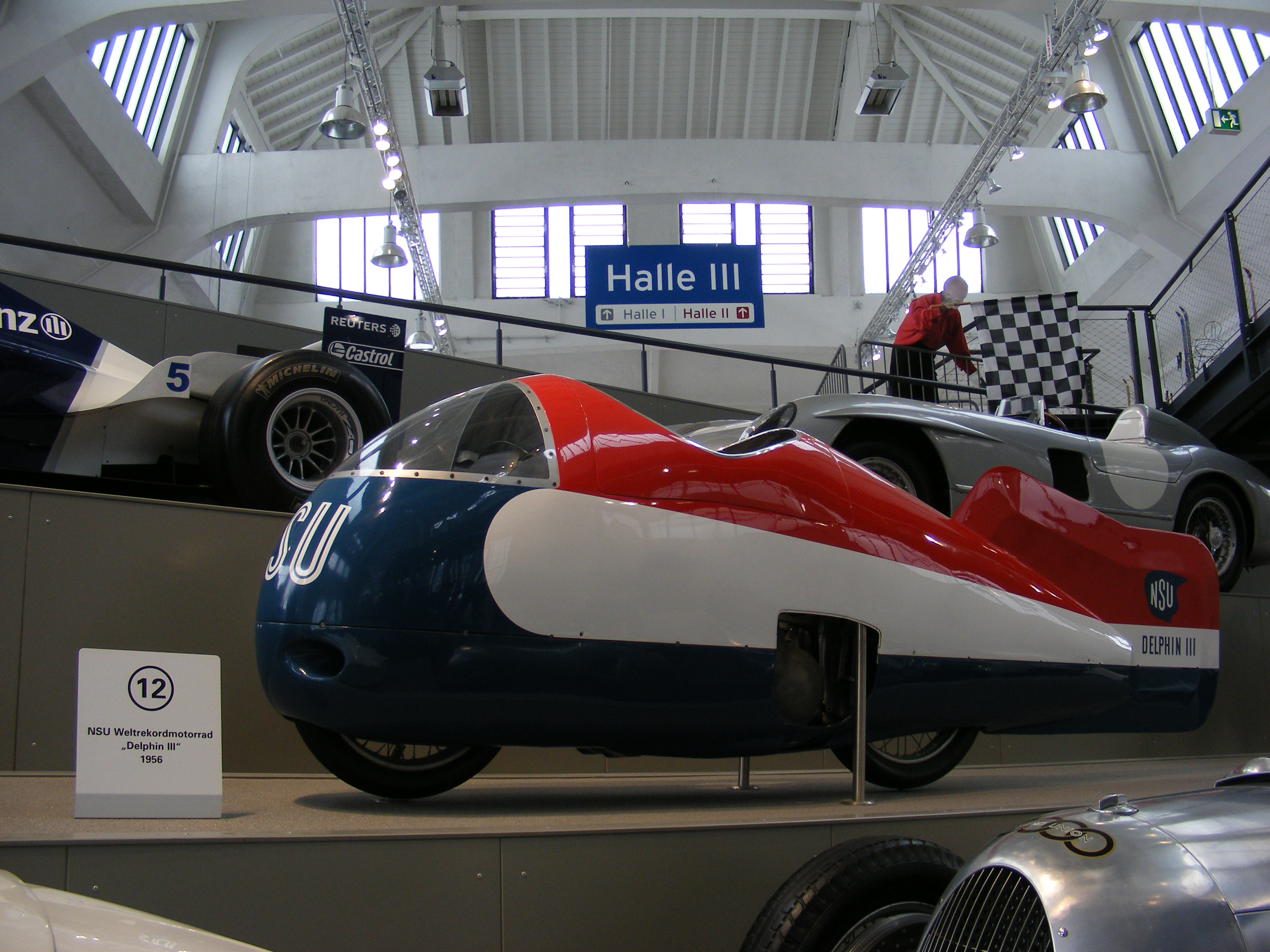
- Delphin III in the Deutsches Museum in Munich
- Manufacturer: NSU Motorenwerke
- Also called: Dolphin III
- Predecessor: Delphin I/II
- Class: Streamliner
- Engine: 499 cc, 4-cycle supercharged parallel twin
- Top speed: 210.64 mph (338.99 km/h)
- Power: 110 hp @ 8,500 RPM
- Dimensions: L: 3.7 m (12 ft); H: 1.1 m (43 in)

The NSU Delphin III streamliner motorcycle set the motorcycle land speed record in 1956. Wilhelm Herz rode the machine to 211.4 miles per hour (340.2 km/h) at Bonneville Speedway in Utah, to break 200 mph (320 km/h) for the first time. Its fairing, designed in a wind tunnel at University of Stuttgart (then Stuttgart Technical College), gave it a drag coefficient of 0.19. The same engine powered Herz to a 1951 world speed record, with a less efficient frame/fairing, the Delphin I. The engine used an unusual rotary supercharger related to NSU's eventual development of the Wankel engine. In the supercharger, both a trochoidal inner rotor and epitrochoidal outer rotor spun around a stationary shaft.
