= Advance Motor Manufacturing Company =

British motorcycle and engine manufacturer

- Type: Private
- Industry: Motorcycle, Aero engine
- Founded: 1905
- Founder: Douglas Gainsford and Frederick Smart
- Defunct: 1947
- Fate: Sold to Sheepbridge Engineering
- Successor: Advance Motor Supplies Ltd.
- Headquarters: Northampton, United Kingdom
- Key people: Douglas Gainsford and Frederick Smart
- Products: Motorcycles and Engines

The Advance Motor Manufacturing Company was a British motorcycle and engine manufacturer established in 1905. As well as supplying aircraft engines to the pioneering monoplane developers, Advance engines were also used by Captain Robert Scott to power Antarctic snow sleds. After the end of the Second World War, the company was sold to Sheepbridge Engineering and became a motor supplies organisation.

== History ==
The Advance Motor Manufacturing Company Ltd was incorporated on 31 May 1905 with registered offices at Louise Road, Northampton by Douglas Herbert Gainsford and Frederick Smart, with an original share capital of £10,000. Gainsford and Smart previously ran a bicycle shop in Northampton that also hired out motorcycles, and from 1903 when Joseph Power joined them they began designing and manufacturing engines and motorcycles. The reliability of Advance engines was such that it was not long before they were in demand from other motorcycle manufacturers and they came to be exported all over the world.

Moving to a larger factory on the corner of Kingsthorpe Road and Balmoral Road in 1912, Advance ended vehicle production to concentrate on reconditioning engines and making components, including the 'Gradua' multi-speed mechanism for Zenith Motorcycles and engines for Duzmo Motorcycles, producing everything in-house except for cylinder castings. As well as producing their own products and supplying stationary engines for driving agricultural machinery, Advance were agents for Kerry Cars and dealers for Brown and Barlow carburettors.

Advance were also pioneers and innovators, with a number of patents for components such as the 'Advance Adjustable Pulley' (the basis of the Gradua multi-speed mechanism) that aided the ascent of steep hills, and their adjustable belt fastener. They had a sister company that was incorporated in 1916, Standard Valves Ltd, which manufactured replacement valves for the motor trade.

By 1936 Advance had become contractors to the War Office, Admiralty and the Air Ministry, providing specialist engineering services including cylinder re-grinding and repairs, case hardening and grinding. Sometime between 1949 and 1953 Advance was sold to Sheepbridge Engineering of Chesterfield and renamed Advance Motor Supplies Ltd, and in 1979 they were taken over by GKN Plc who changed the name to GKN Replacement Services Ltd in 1982. The name was changed again by 1984 to GKN Autoparts Distribution Ltd, then in January 1990 it became Partco Ltd and finally Partco AutoParts Ltd in October 1995. As of October 2011, the company was still on the UK register of companies, but is shown as being dormant.

== Motorcycles ==
The 1904 360 cc Advance 2¾ hp (2.05 kW) motorcycle on display at the National Motorcycle Museum (UK) is thought to be the only complete Advance motorcycle in existence. The engine has an automatic inlet valve above a mechanical exhaust valve and the rear wheel is driven by a belt from the crankshaft. Pedals and a free-wheel hub are provided for starting and helping the engine on steep hills. The handlebar grips, pedal blocks and the box for the ignition's accumulator are all made of wood.

The 2¾ hp engine was replaced by a 3 hp (2.2 kW) version, a 3½ hp (2.6 kW) and a 6 hp (4.7 kW) V-twin, all with the same basic design of automatic inlet valves and a one-piece cylinder head and barrel. The Advance engines quickly gained a reputation for reliability and were much in demand from other motorcycle manufacturers. At the Cordingley show in 1907 Advance exhibited 2 variants of their 3 hp single motorcycle and a 3 hp lady's motorcycle with 2-speed gear and spring forks as well as a 6 hp twin-cylinder air-cooled tricar. They also displayed their 3, 6 and 9 hp water and air-cooled engines. In 1908 Advance made a range of motorcycles and three-wheelers including a new 9 hp (6.9 kW) motorcycle with an air-cooled engine.

== Tricars and Forecars ==
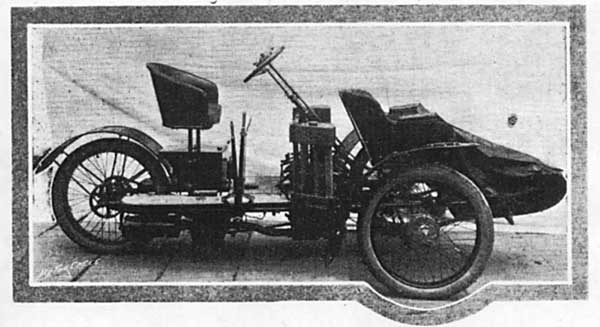
Advance Tri-Car

In addition Advance made a 6 hp Forecar, and 6 and 9 hp Tricars, all of which were available with air- or water-cooled engines. These Forecars were fitted out by Chater-Lea, including the sprung chassis and two-speed gearbox which also had a neutral position. The brakes were foot operated and all controls were contained within the steering wheel. Announced in October 1907, the 9 hp Tricar had trembler coil ignition and was cooled by twin radiators with a belt-driven pump. The water-cooled engine was a V-twin with 90mm bore and 90mm stroke (1145cc). The Chater-Lea three-speed gearbox also had a reverse gear, and front and rear seats had springing for comfort.

A visit to the factory reported in 1907 mentions a 5HP tricar with V-twin air-cooled engine used to collect the visitors, and production of both air and water-cooled tricars with or without 2-speed gear (as well as motorcycles).

== Advance V4 aero engine ==
The Advance V4 aero engine was made from two V-twin engines bolted together back-to-back. One of the engines would have been running backwards and it is not known how the crankshafts were joined. The carburettor was a Brown & Barlow type 65DU or GU as used by cars of the time and fed a one-into-two-into-four manifold. With an output of 20 brake horsepower (15 kW) and a capacity of 2290 cc, the flywheel was 9.25 inches (23.5 cm) in diameter and weighed 36 pounds (16 kg). The engine revved to 1,800 rpm.

=== Grose Monoplane ===
The Grose Monoplane was built in Oakington in 1909 by Alfred Grose and Neville Feary, to attempt to win the Daily Mail prize of £1,000 for the first British aircraft to fly a circular mile with a British pilot. The Advance V4 aero engine was chosen to provide the power and in its first trial the monoplane was tethered to a tree but it never flew. It was eventually dismantled and taken to de Havilland at Hatfield.

=== Dixon Nipper ===
Another aircraft to use the Advance V4 aero engine was the 'Dixon Nipper No.1', designed and built by H.S. Dixon in 1911 with a wingspan of 26 feet (7.9 m). A single-seat canard pusher monoplane, the Nipper flew but crashed and was completely wrecked in an accident at Acton. The Nipper's unusual design was recognised by Hollywood, however, as a non-flying replica was built for the 1960s comedy film Those Magnificent Men in their Flying Machines, called the Little Fiddler.

=== Hammond Monoplane ===
The Hammond Monoplane used a 30 horsepower (22 kW) water-cooled Advance V4 engine and was built at Brooklands in the summer of 1913. A single-seat monoplane, it was designed and built by experienced pioneering aviator Edward Victor Hammond who had built and flown a biplane in 1910 and a triplane in 1911 at Brooklands. The Advance engine was modified by Hammond and the fuselage consisted of a pair of parallel steel tubes.

=== Handley Page Bluebird ===
The first powered Handley Page aircraft, the Type A Bluebird of 1910, used an Advance V-four engine. A single-seat monoplane, the Bluebird was made of wood covered with fabric, and crash landed on its maiden flight on 26 May 1910. Changes were made to improve control and a more powerful Alvaston flat-twin engine of 25 horsepower (19 kW) replaced the Advance. When the Bluebird was exhibited at Olympia in April 1911 it had progressed to a 35 horsepower (26 kW) Green engine, which in turn was replaced by an Isaacson radial engine and first flew 15 July 1911, once again crash landing, so it may have been the airframe design rather than the Advance engine that was the cause of the problem.

== Antarctic snow-sled ==
The engine developed for the Grose Monoplane was also tested in Norway in 1909 as a snow-sled engine by Antarctic explorer Captain Robert Scott. The engine was changed to an in-line four-cylinder 16 horsepower (12 kW) unit with mechanical inlet valves, rather than their usual automatic valves. It used a Brown & Barlow carburettor and had a Bosch magneto ignition. The motorised sledge engine was designed to run for 300 miles (480 km) carrying three-quarters of a ton at a top speed of just 3 miles per hour (4.8 km/h). In the coverage of Scott's departure on 1 June 1910 The New York Times quoted him as saying they would take the motorised sledges as far as they could and hoped they would "relieve the ponies and dogs of weight and increase the safety of the return journey".
