= Valerie Thompson =

American motorcycle racer

- Known for: Motorcycling
- Website: valeriethompsonracing.com

Valerie Thompson (born April 17, 1967) is an American motorcycle drag and land speed racer. She is a seven-time motorcycle land-speed record holder and charter member of the Mojave Magnum "200 MPH Club."

In 2012, Thompson was selected to drive the North American Eagle Project jet car for an attempt to break the long-standing land speed record for a woman, set by Kitty O'Neil in December 1976, at 512.71 mph (825.13 km/h). The Project's vehicle did not break O'Neil's record until sometime after Thompson's time with the team, when driver Jessi Combs was killed during deceleration, after an August 2019 run where she set the speed record for a woman, at 522.783 mph (841.338 km/h).

In 2007, Thompson sponsored the domain website GoDaddy.

Thompson raced the BUB Seven Streamliner at the 2017 Bonneville Motorcycle Speed Trials.
