= Dave Campos =

American motorcycle racer

Dave Campos (born 1942, Santa Rosa, New Mexico) is a top-fuel drag motorcycle racer and held the motorcycle land speed record from 1990 until 2006.

== Motorcycle world land speed record ==
Campos set both the AMA and FIM absolute speed records on Saturday July 14, 1990 with an overall average speed of 518.450 km/h (322.150 mph), and a second, faster run at an average of 519.609 km/h (322.870 mph).

The bike was a 23 ft (7.0 m) long streamliner named Easyriders, powered by two Ruxton-Harley-Davidson 1500 cc engines with a dry weight of 2,500 pounds (1,100 kg). It is claimed that the record drew the largest ever crowd to Bonneville Salt Flats. The bike was sponsored by individual members of the public for $25 shares, with an opportunity to attend the event and have your name somewhere on the bike. Some 10,000 took up the offer. On the third day of the sixteen it took to break the record, the bike was damaged after an accident. The team and many sponsors stayed up three days and nights to fix it. The only suitably specified front tyre for 400 mph (640 km/h) was manufactured by Firestone in 1967. The team had a small stock of second hand versions.

The streamliner is owned by Joe Teresi, owner and publisher of Easyriders magazine.

Campos' record was broken by Rocky Robinson driving the Top 1 Ack Attack streamliner on September 3, 2006, only to be broken again two days later by Chris Carr. The current motorcycle land speed record belongs to Rocky Robinson and the Top 1 Ack Attack team and was set September 25, 2010 at 376.363 mph (605 km/h) with an exit speed on the final run of over 394 mph (634 km/h).

The Easyrider Streamliner with Campos at the controls still holds the motorcycle land speed record for a normally aspirated motorcycle engine. All subsequent record holders utilized engines with forced induction.
