= Gyronaut X-1 =

Land speed record motorcycle (1966-70)

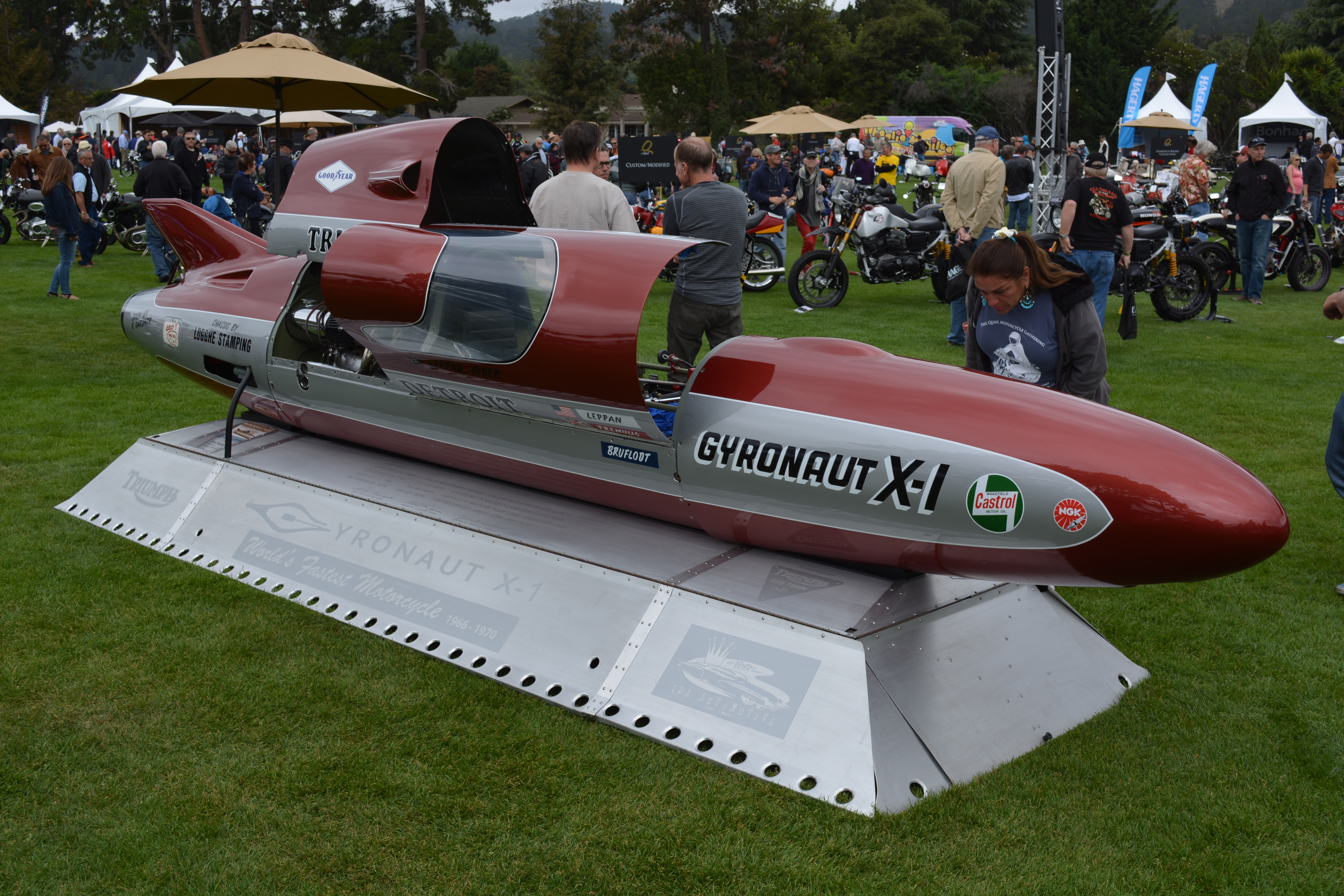
Gyronaut X-1 displayed at Quail Motorcycle Gathering, Carmel, California during 2015

Gyronaut X-1 was a streamliner motorcycle that set the motorcycle land-speed record of 245.667 mph (395.363 km/h) in 1966, ridden by Detroit Triumph dealer Bob Leppan. It was powered by two 650 cc Triumph TR6 Trophy motorcycle engines.

The streamlined body was designed by Alex Tremulis, who designed automobiles including the Tucker automobile and Ford Gyron.

It had innovative safety equipment including a cromoly steel roll cage and fire suppression equipment.

Gyronaut crashed in 1970 at over 280 mph (450 km/h). Four decades later, Steve Tremulis, nephew of the designer, displayed the partially restored Gyronaut to the public for the first time in early 2012. It was shown fully restored at Speed Week in 2013, and won a special award at the 2014 Quail Motorcycle Gathering.

== See also ==
- List of motorcycles by type of engine
