= Silver Bird (streamliner) =

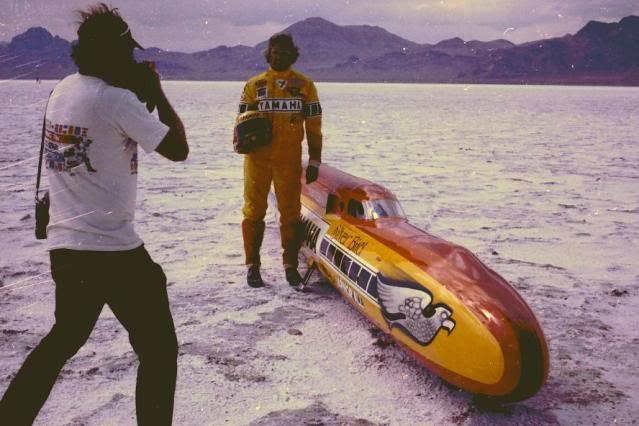
- Don Vesco with Silver Bird at Bonneville Speedway
- Manufacturer: Don Vesco
- Predecessor: "Big Red" streamliner
- Successor: "Lightning Bolt" streamliner
- Class: Streamliner
- Engine: 2× Yamaha Inline-4 694.9 cc (42.41 cu in) reed-valve two-stroke, 1,389.8 cc (84.81 cu in) total displacement
- Bore / stroke: 64 mm × 54 mm (2.52 in × 2.13 in)
- Top speed: 303.812 mph (488.938 km/h)
- Power: 240 hp (180 kW)
- Dimensions: L: 21 ft (6.4 m); H: 32 in (810 mm)
- Weight: 900 lb (410 kg) (wet)

Silver Bird was a motorcycle land-speed record setting streamliner motorcycle. It was powered by two motors delivering 240 horsepower (180 kW). It was the first motorcycle to set a speed record over 300 miles per hour (480 km/h), when ridden by Don Vesco at the Bonneville Speedway in 1975.

== Construction ==
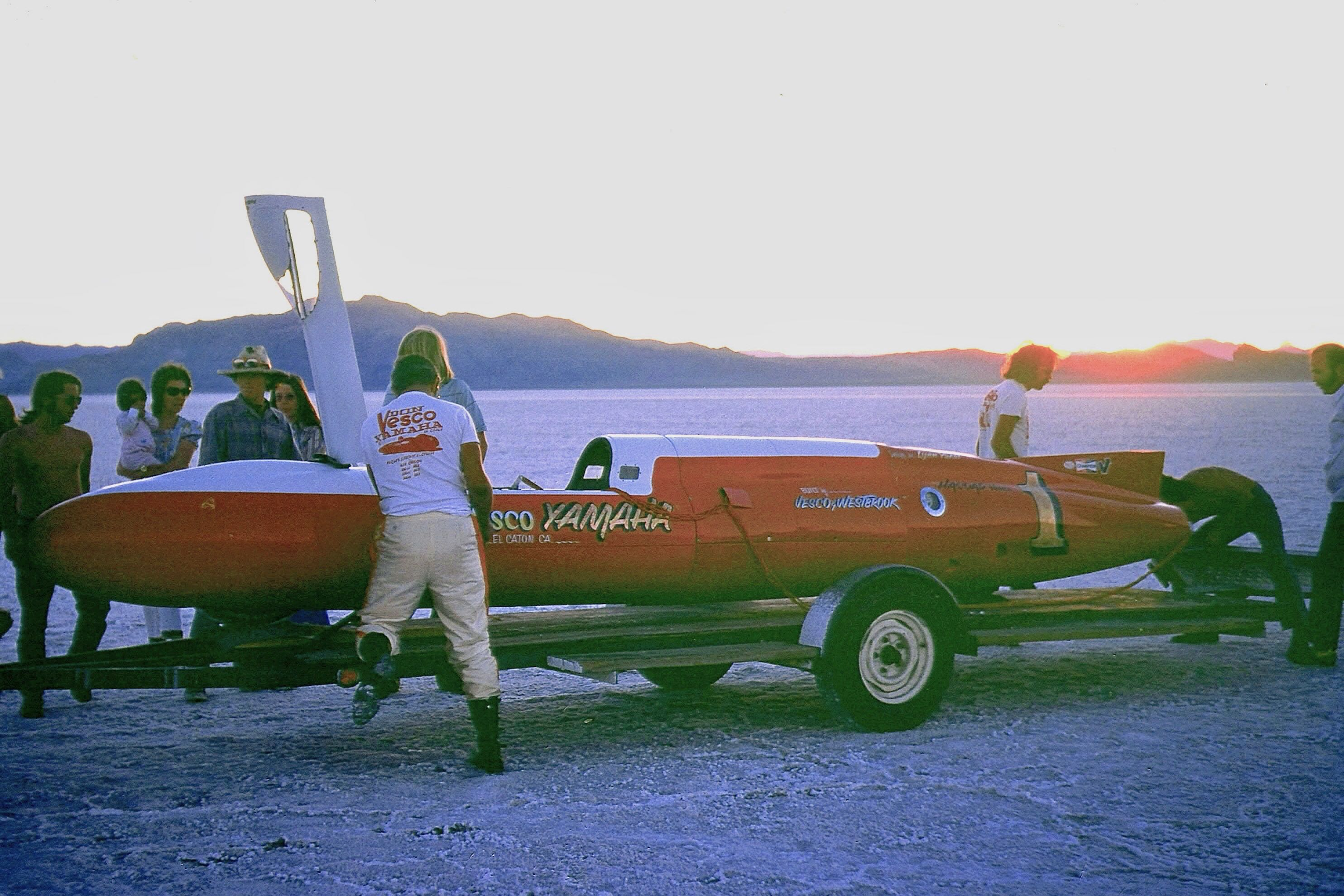
Silver Bird c. 1974 with shorter stabilizing fin than on the 1975 record setting run

The motorcycle was built by Don Vesco and sponsored by Yamaha. It had two four-cylinder, 694.9 cc reed-valve two-stroke engines from the Yamaha TZ750 racebike.

=== Specifications ===
- Displacement: 1,389.8 cc total
- Engine bore and stroke: 64mm×54mm
- Dimensions: 21 feet long, 32 inches high
- Weight: c. 900 pounds (410 kg)
