= Big Red (motorcycle) =

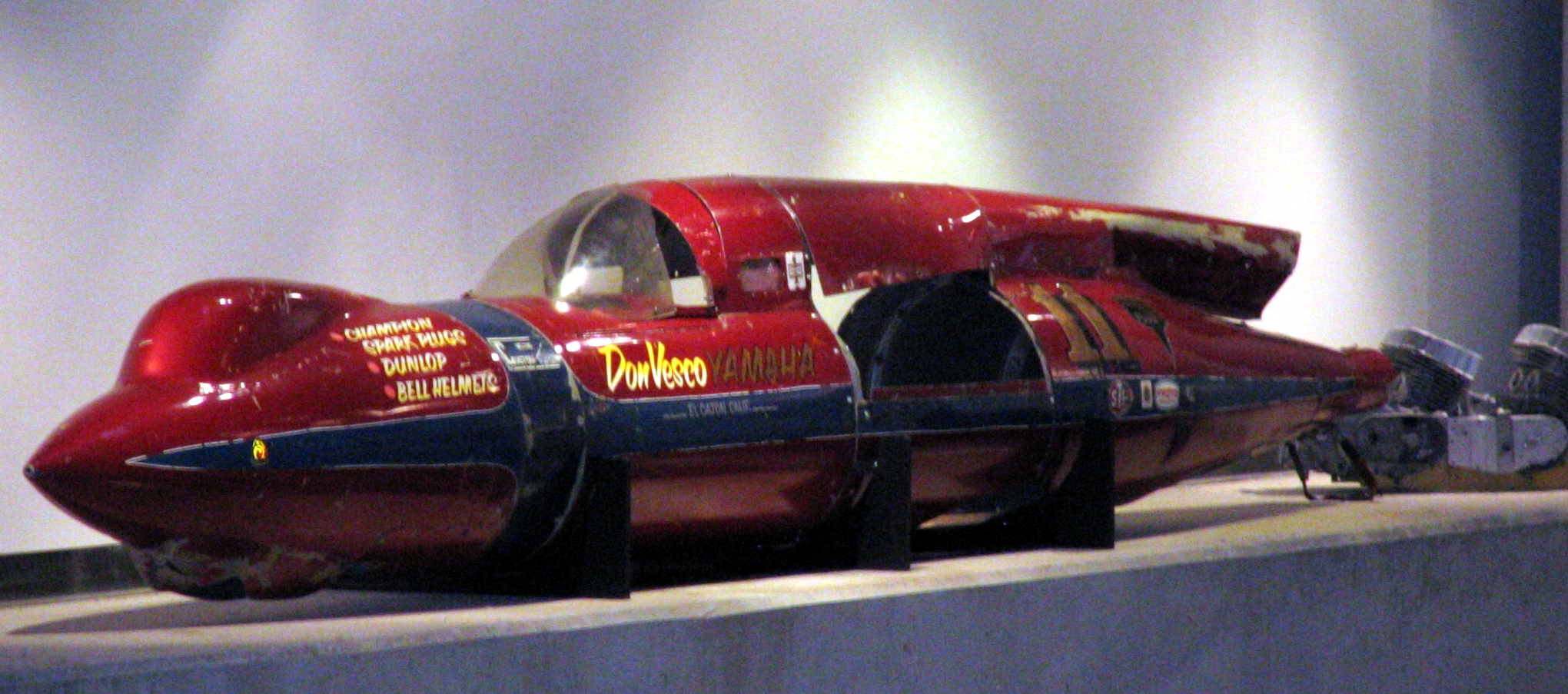
- Big Red at Barber Vintage Motorsports Museum
- Manufacturer: Don Vesco
- Production: 1969–1970
- Successor: "Silver Bird"
- Class: Speed record streamliner motorcycle
- Engine: Two 350 cc (21 cu in) two-stroke, two-cylinder Yamaha motors
- Frame type: Monocoque body (drop tank)
- Brakes: Parachute assist
- Dimensions: L: 5,486 mm (18 ft 0 in)

Big Red is the streamliner motorcycle with which American Don Vesco set the motorcycle land-speed record of 405.25 km/h (251.81 mph) on 17 September 1970 at the Bonneville Salt Flats in Utah.

At Bonneville Speed Week in 1969, Vesco took Big Red to a speed of 365 km/h (227 mph). The following year, using the 5.5-metre (18 ft 1 in) long motorcycle constructed from an aircraft drop tank, he undertook several attempts to break the 395.363-kilometre-per-hour (245.667 mph) record set by Robert Leppan in 1966. He succeeded by reaching 405.25 km/h (251.81 mph). A month later, Cal Rayborn set a new record averaging 427.25 km/h (265.48 mph) across two runs in opposite directions.

The motorcycle is currently on display at the Barber Vintage Motorsports Museum.
