= Duzmo Motorcycles =

British motorcycle manufacturer

- Industry: Manufacturing and engineering
- Founded: 1919
- Defunct: 1923
- Fate: Sold
- Successor: D. J. Sheppards
- Headquarters: Enfield Highway, UK
- Key people: John Wallace
- Products: Motorcycles

Duzmo Motorcycles was a British motorcycle manufacturer. Founded in Enfield Highway, London in 1919 by John Wallace, engines for the early Duzmo machines were manufactured by the Advance Motor Manufacturing Company in Northampton. Wallace had no training as an engineer but while he was still at school he set up a workshop in his garden and built a motorcycle from parts. This experience helped him secure an apprenticeship with Collier & Sons. His father bought him a Rudge racing motorcycle and he began competing at Brooklands. Originally riding for JAP until they found he was under age, Wallace met Bert le Vack and both found work at Scottish car makers Arrol-Johnston designing aircraft engines for the duration of the First World War.

After the war Wallace designed a racing motorcycle engine and sold the design to the Portable Tool and Engineering Company of Enfield Highway, who employed Wallace as their chief designer. Bert le Vack helped with development and between them created the Duzmo in 1920. They were keen to go into production but the Portable Tool directors decided to wind up the company. Wallace borrowed money to go it alone and built Duzmo motorcycles under his own name, with engines made for him by The Advance Motor Manufacturing Co. of Northampton.

Wallace designed the last Duzmo in 1923. It had a number of novel innovations, including an inclined engine and low seat but only one was built before Wallace ran out of money and had to sell the business to D. J. Sheppards. He returned to aircraft engine design with D. Napier & Sons and died in 1983.

== Models ==
Model	Year	Notes
Duzmo 496cc	1920	Belt drive
Duzmo 992cc	1922	V twin
Duzmo	1923	Inclined engine
