= Zenith Motorcycles =

Former British motorcycle manufacturer

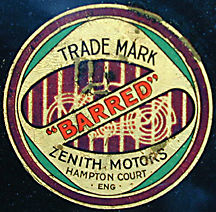
- Industry: Manufacturing and engineering
- Founded: 1904
- Defunct: 1950
- Headquarters: London
- Products: Motorcycles

Zenith Motorcycles was a British motorcycle and automobile manufacturer established in Finsbury Park, London in 1903, by W. G. Bowers. Automobile manufacture only lasted from 1905 to 1906. The first Zenith motorcycle was the 'BiCar' of 1903, based on Tooley's Bi-Car design, which was purchased by Zenith for its own production. The BiCar was a unique design with hub-center steering and a low-slung chassis with the engine (from Fafnir in Germany) centrally fixed.

Fred ('Freddie') W. Barnes was hired as chief engineer in 1905, and patented the "Gradua" variable-ratio belt drive transmission that year. The Gradua system simultaneously changed the diameter of the crankshaft belt-drive pulley to alter the drive ratio, while moving the rear wheel forward or back to maintain belt tension. The Gradua's action was controlled by a rotating lever atop the fuel tank, and was among the first attempts to provide multiple drive ratios for a motorcycle, at a time when very simple, direct belt-drive transmission was the industry norm. Variable drive ratios proved a significant advantage in competition, leading riders of other marques to complain the Gradua gave an unfair advantage; eventually Zeniths with Gradua gears were banned from many competitions. Zenith capitalized on this ban, adding the word "Barred" to their advertising and logo. The Gradua system was replaced by the now-standard gearbox and chain transmission in 1924.

In 1914, the factory moved to larger premises, quite close to the Brooklands race track,( 5 miles away) at the old East Molesey Mill about halfway between East Molesey and Esher. As WW1 rapidly approached, the factory turned its attention to commercial sidecar outfits, ostensibly to replace the horses commandeered by the military. After WW1, racing and endurance trials occupied much of Freddie Barnes' interest. Zenith motorcycles used engines from various suppliers including Precision, Villiers, Bradshaw, Martlett, British Anzani, Fafnir, and JAP.

Zenith was a relatively small manufacturer, but had significant success in speed contests throughout the 'Teen and 1920s. Chief Engineer Freddie Barnes personally oversaw Zeniths in competition, and in the 1920s racing Zeniths held more 'Gold Stars' on the Brooklands racing circuit (for 100+mph laps in competition) than any other marque. Racing engines of single and v-twin configuration included the most advanced designs available, including the DOHC single-cylinder JAP, the twin-cam JAP sidevalve v-twin, the Martlett OHV 1000cc v-twin, the Blackburne OHV 1000cc v-twin, and the JAP KTOR and JTOR OHV 1000cc v-twins. Riders included 'Ted' Baragwanath, Bert LeVack, Owen Baldwin, H.M. Walters, and Joe Wright.

In the 1931 Zenith declared bankruptcy due to the Depression, although 'Writers of Kennington', a principal Zenith dealer, purchased the name and restarted production at the Hampton Court factory in Surrey on the river and immediately adjacent to the Hurst Park horse racing venue. The Second World War interrupted production again, and Zenith finally ceased production in 1950. The last Zenith models of 1947-1950 used JAP 750cc sidevalve v-twins, and were basically the same models as produced before WW2.

== Automobile history ==
Between 1905 and 1906, the company introduced the Popular model, which had a two-cylinder, 6HP Stevens engine and a belt driven rear axle.

== Speed records ==
Zenith were always keen to promote themselves via competition. Freddie Barnes competed and won regularly on his own machines in 1909–1913, and in 1922 it was a Zenith that was the first British machine to do a 100 mph (160 km/h) lap of the Brooklands circuit with rider Bert le Vack. In 1925 Zenith held the record for the number of over 100 mph laps of the bumpy Brooklands circuit. Works rider Joseph S. Wright held the lap record at Brooklands from 1925 until 1935.

Zenith held the motorcycle world speed record on two occasions, the first FIM record of 124.55 mph (200.44 km/h) set in 1928 by Owen M. Baldwin at Arpajon, France, the site of the Autodrome de Linas-Montlhéry. Bert le Vack surpassed Baldwin the following year on a 995 cc (60.7 cu in) Brough-Superior at the same location. In 1930 Zenith was in financial trouble due to the recession, and were taken over by one of their dealers, Writer's of South London. The ex-Zenith works rider Joe Wright, riding an OEC with a 994 cc (60.7 cu in) JAP engine, took back the record on 31 August at 137.23 mph (220.85 km/h), again at Arpajon, France. But the record was broken twice more in 1930, first to Ernst Jakob Henne riding a supercharged BMW to 137.85 mph (221.85 km/h) at Ingolstadt, Germany. Claude Temple made arrangements to try to win the title back in Cork, Ireland using his supercharged OEC again with Joe Wright on board. Joe Wright had managed to acquire the works 995 cc (60.7 cu in) supercharged J.A.P-engined Zenith, and he took this to Ireland as a spare machine (visible on the Pathe news when the OEC is tow started). The OEC bike suffered a mechanical failure and was not able to complete the required two runs, so Wright used his Zenith to set a new world record of 150.65 mph (242.45 km/h). As Zenith were temporarily out of business, and OEC were paying the bills, the fact the Zenith had made the run and not the OEC was conveniently overlooked in much of the publicity of the time, and even in the FIM record books .. An eyewitness account by Freddie Barnes himself was published the following year, noting the Zenith victory, and later eyewitness accounts confirmed his claim.

== Models ==
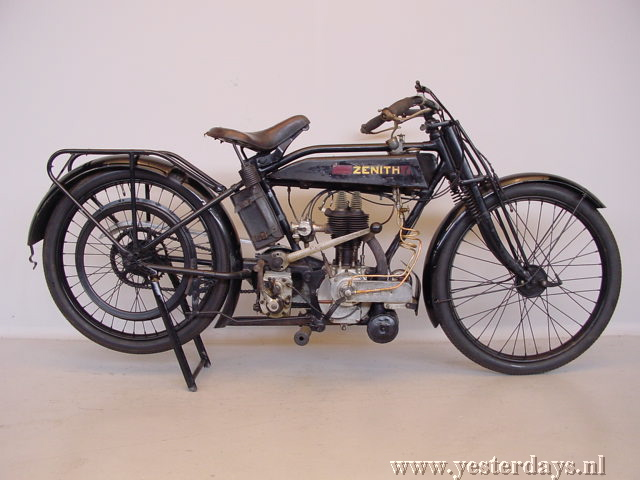
1924 Zenith JAP 346 cc

Model	Year	Notes
Zenith Bi-Car	1903	Hub-center steered, full suspension
Zenith Tri-Car	1908	Fafnir single-cylinder
Zenith 'Zenette'	1908	Fafnir single-cylinder
Zenith 'Zenette' Tri-car	1908	J.A.P. water-cooled 6HP, Chater-Lea 2-speed gear
Zenith Gradua 6HP (770cc)	1911	"Gradua" variable drive belt
Zenith 3 1/2HP	1911	JAP single-cylinder sidevalve 500cc
Zenith Lightweight	1911	JAP single-cylinder OHV 250cc
Zenith 8HP Twin-Cylinder Racer	1913	JAP twin-cylinder '90 Bore' OHV
Zenith 3 1/2HP Single-Cylinder Racer	1913	JAP single-cylinder '90 Bore' OHV
Zenith Models E, G, J	1914	JAP V-twin sidevalve 770cc, 1000cc, 1100cc
Zenith Gradua 680 cc	1918	JAP Twin
Zenith-Bradshaw 494cc	1922	Oil-cooled horizontally opposed Bradshaw engine
Zenith "Brooklands".	1923	344 cc JAP engine
Zenith 346 cc	1924	JAP engine
Zenith 680 cc	1926	Side-valve JAP engine
Zenith C5 Special 500 cc	1936	JAP 500cc OHV engine
Zenith 750 cc	1948	JAP engine

The Zenette motorcycle and Zenette tri-car had a novel form of rear suspension at a time when most motorcycles had none, partly because of the effect rear suspension had on the tension of the drive belt. In the Zenette this was overcome by having the swinging arm pivoted near the centre of the engine and mounting the engine on the swinging arm. The Zenette motorcycle had another instantly recognisable feature, the fuel tank and battery were at the rear of the engine space, leaving a bare top tube.

== See also ==
- List of car manufacturers of the United Kingdom
- List of motorcycles of the 1910s
- List of motorcycles of the 1920s
- List of motorcycles of the 1930s
