= BUB Seven Streamliner =

BUB Seven
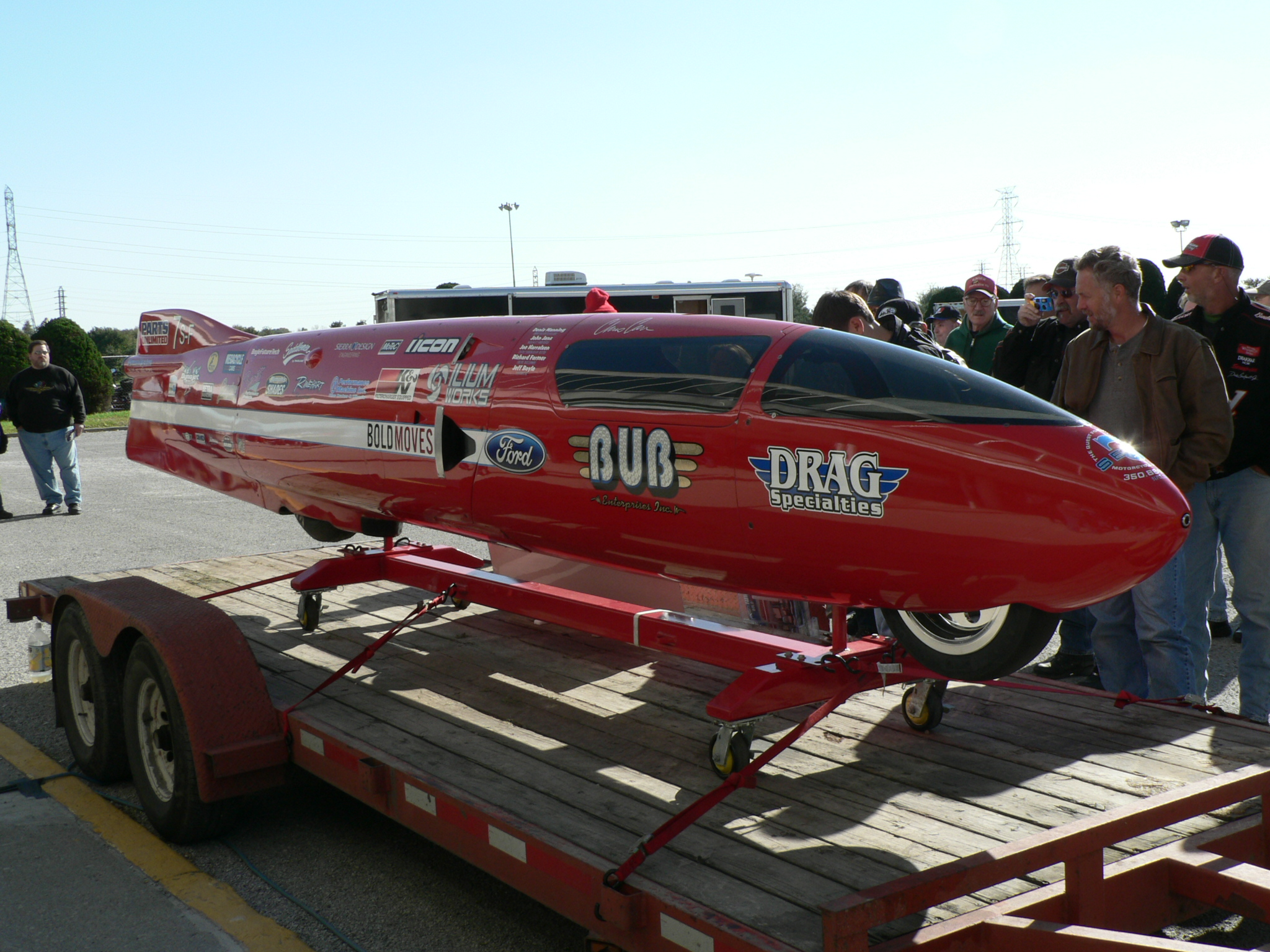
- Manufacturer: Denis Manning/BUB Enterprises
- Also called: Lucky 7
- Class: Streamliner
- Engine: 2,997 cc 16-valve turbocharged V-4
- Bore / stroke: 4.125 in x 3 in
- Compression ratio: 9.5 : 1
- Top speed: 367.382 mph (591.244 km/h)
- Power: 500 brake horsepower (370 kW) @ 8500 RPM
- Torque: 400 pound force-feet (540 N⋅m) @ 8500 RPM
- Transmission: Four speed, dry clutch Water-cooled chain drive
- Frame type: Carbon fiber/kevlar/aluminum honeycomb composite monocoque
- Dimensions: L: 21 ft (6.4 m); W: 22 in (0.56 m); H: 32 in (0.81 m)
- Weight: 1,600 lb (730 kg) (dry)

BUB Seven Streamliner is an American-built streamliner motorcycle that held the motorcycle land-speed record from 2006 to 2008 and again from 2009 to 2010. BUB Seven and two other streamliners traded the title of "world's fastest motorcycle" during official speed runs at Bonneville Speedway in the summer of 2006. The other two competitors were Ack Attack and the EZ-Hook streamliner. In 2017, Valerie Thompson rode BUB Seven for more record attempts at Bonneville.

== Design ==
Design for the streamliner is attributed to Motorcycle Hall of Fame inductee Denis Manning, who is also the owner, although it was listed for sale in 2010. Additional design work for the purpose-built V-4 engine was provided by Joe Harralson of Sierra Design Engineering. According to Harralson, the only off the shelf component in the engine is the oil filter. Manning has stated that the aerodynamic shape was inspired by the Coho salmon, who he observed swimming 50 miles per hour (80 km/h) in the Columbia River.

Manning had previously built Cal Rayborn's 1970 world speed record motorcycle, using a similar streamlined fairing built from a surplus jet drop tank.

=== Specifications ===
- Weight: 1,600 lb (730 kg)
- Length : 21 ft (6.4 m)
- Height: 32 in (0.81 m)
- Width: 22 in (0.56 m)
- Coefficient of drag: 0.08 or 0.09
