= Don Vesco =

American motorcyclist (1939–2002)

Donald A. Vesco
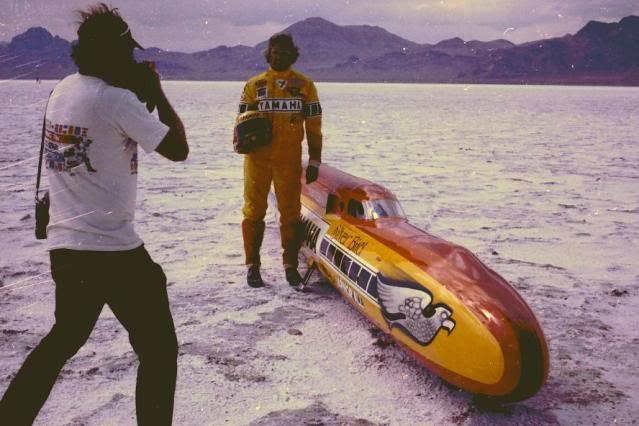
- Vesco with his Silver Bird streamliner at the Bonneville Speedway
- Born: April 8, 1939; Loma Linda, California, U.S.
- Died: December 16, 2002 (aged 63); San Diego, California, U.S.
- Occupations: Motorcycle racer and businessperson
- Known for: Motorcycle land-speed record and wheel-driven land speed record

Don Vesco (April 8, 1939 – December 16, 2002) was an American businessman and motorcycle racer who held multiple motorcycle land-speed and wheel-driven land speed records. In his lifetime, he set 18 motorcycle and 6 automobile speed records.

Vesco's accomplishments recognized by the American Motorcyclist Association include winning the United States motorcycle Grand Prix 500 cc class in 1963, operating a California motorcycle dealership that sponsored up to 60 racers at a time, and setting a number of motorcycle and automobile land speed records.

== Speed records ==
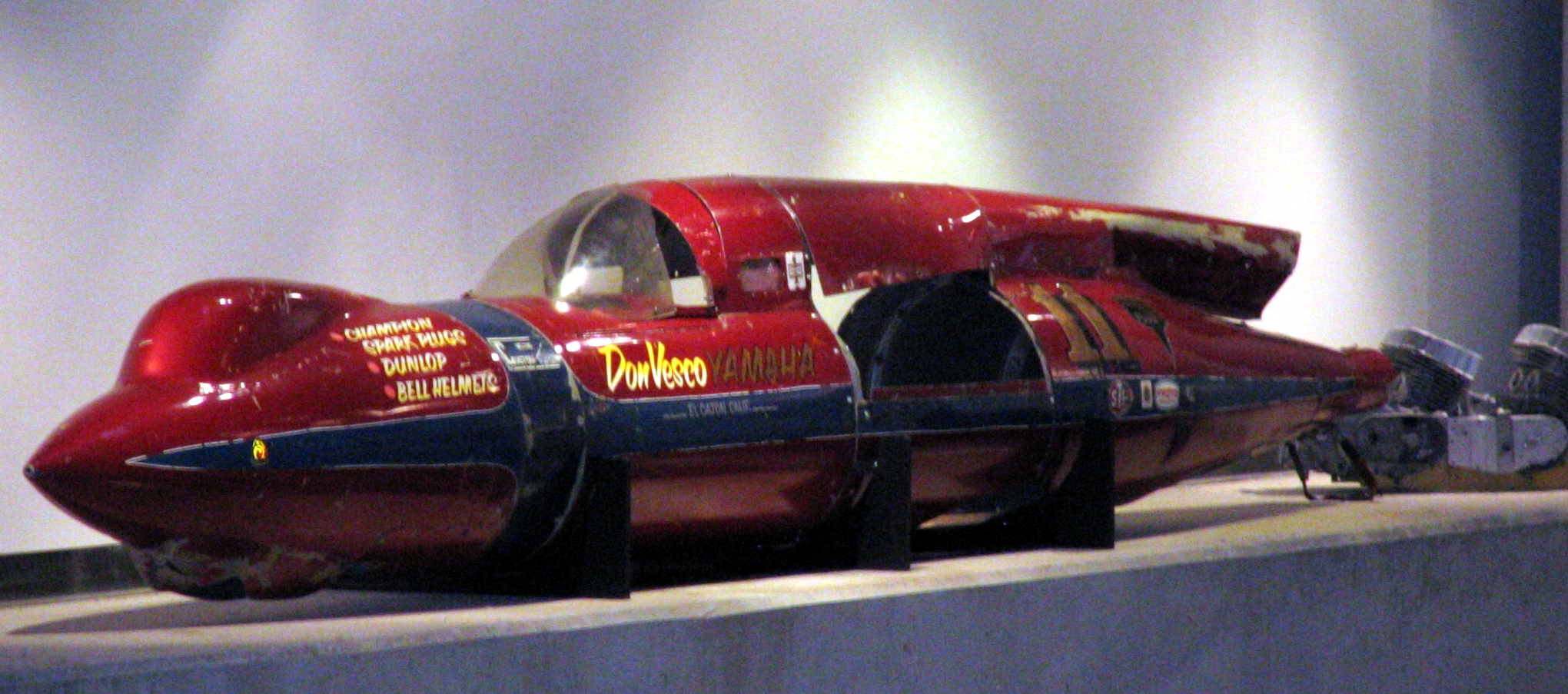
"Big Red" at Barber Vintage Motorsports Museum

Vesco's motorcycle land speed records were set in 1970 at 251.66 miles per hour (405.01 km/h) in a twin-engined streamliner "Big Red", becoming the first person to ride faster than 250 mph; in 1975, when he pushed past the 300-mile-per-hour (480 km/h) milestone for the first time with "Silver Bird"; and in 1978 at 318.598 miles per hour (512.734 km/h) in a twin-turbo powered streamliner "Lightning Bolt", a record that stood for 12 years.

In 2001, Vesco set the FIA wheel-driven land speed record of 458.440 miles per hour (737.788 km/h) in a turboshaft powered streamliner called "Turbinator". After Don's death "Turbinator" was further improved by his brother Rick Vesco, and Vesco driver Dave Spangler averaged 493.03 miles per hour (793.45 km/h) in 2018.

== Other designs ==
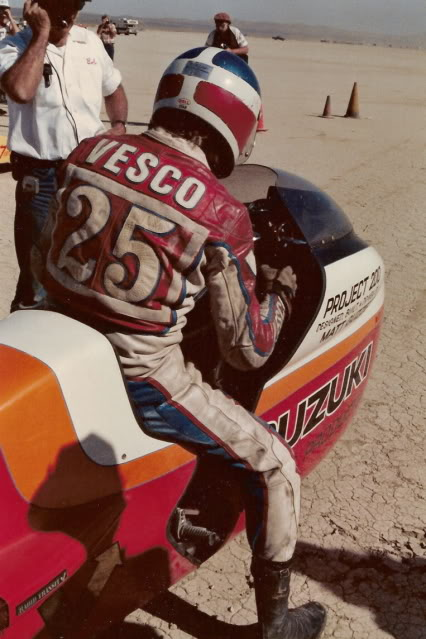
Vesco on the "Project 200" high-mileage motorcycle designed by Matt Guzzetta

In addition to his own land speed record vehicles, Vesco had a consulting role in other streamlined vehicles. One was Max Lambky's Vincent-engined Lambky Liner streamliner. Another was the "Project 200" streamliner designed by his business partner, Matt Guzzetta, and speed tested by Vesco at El Mirage Dry Lake. Project 200 competed in the Craig Vetter Fuel Economy Challenge and in 1983 performed an American coast-to-coast transit without refueling, sponsored by Motorcyclist magazine.

Vesco also designed aftermarket motorcycle accessories including extended range gas tanks for offroad motorcycles sold through Don Vesco Products, which also had a line of motorcycle fairings called "Rabid Transit" designed by Guzzetta.

== Death ==
Vesco died in 2002 from prostate cancer.

== Honors ==
Vesco was inducted to the Motorcycle Hall of Fame in 1999 and posthumously inducted to the Motorsports Hall of Fame of America in 2004.

=== Collections ===
Vesco's "Big Red" #11 streamliner is part of the Barber Vintage Motorsports Museum collection. His #14 streamliner, with a fiberglass body molded around a 22-inch aircraft drop tank, powered by twin supercharged Yamaha XS650 SOHC engines, is on display at the National Motorcycle Museum in Iowa. The "Project 200" fuel efficiency contest streamliner was on display at the San Diego Automotive Museum as of 2011.

== Notes and references ==
=== Sources ===
Speed records

- Setright, L.J.K. (1979), The Guinness book of motorcycling facts and feats, Guinness Superlatives, ISBN 978-0-85112-200-7
- Glick, Shav (December 18, 2002), Obituaries: Don Vesco, 63; Held Speed Records for Cars, Motorcycles
- "Don Vesco, 63, Record-Setting Motorcyclist", The New York Times, December 20, 2002
- 300 MPH chapter, Bonneville 200 MPH Club
- Youngblood, Ed (January 12, 2008). "Current news: New at the National Motorcycle Museum (USA)". Ed Youngblood's Moto History.
- 1970 Vesco Engineering Yamaha Twin Streamliner, National Motorcycle Museum, c. 2013

Other projects

- Belair, Fernando (February 1976), "Tank buyer's accessory guide", Cycle World: 40–43
- Vetter, Craig (1982), "Craig Vetter Fuel Economy Run Gallery of Winners", Craig Vetter Fuel Economy Challenge website, archived from the original on 2016-03-04
- Renvall, Björn (January 1983), "Nu satsar Don Vesco på ekonomimotorcykeln" [Don Vesco now (working) on economy motorcycle], Allt Om MC (in Swedish)
- Fisher, Jackson (June 1996), "High rollers: meet the long riders", Cycle World: 44 (Rabid Transit fairing)
- Lambky, Max (November 2007), 1990-1992 First Streamliner
- DeWitt, Norm (October 1, 2008), "Coast to coast without refueling? It's been done. (NEXT GAS: 2443 MILES)", Motorcyclist, archived from the original on March 8, 2016 – via HighBeam Research
- Youngblood, Ed (November 30, 2011), "How Matt Guzzetta crossed America on one tank of gas", Ed Youngblood's Motohistory
