= Chris Carr (motorcyclist) =

American motorcycle racer

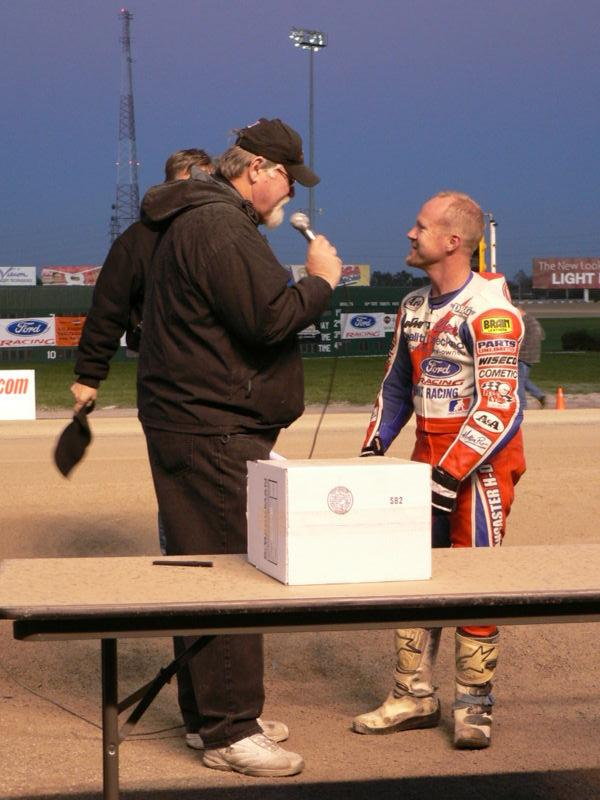
Chris Carr (right) during an interview in October 2006

Chris Carr (born May 6, 1967 in Stockton, California) is an American motorcycle dirt-track racer and seven-time winner of the A.M.A. Grand National Championship. He has also competed as a motorcycle road racer at the national level and was a motorcycle land speed world record holder.

== Racing career ==
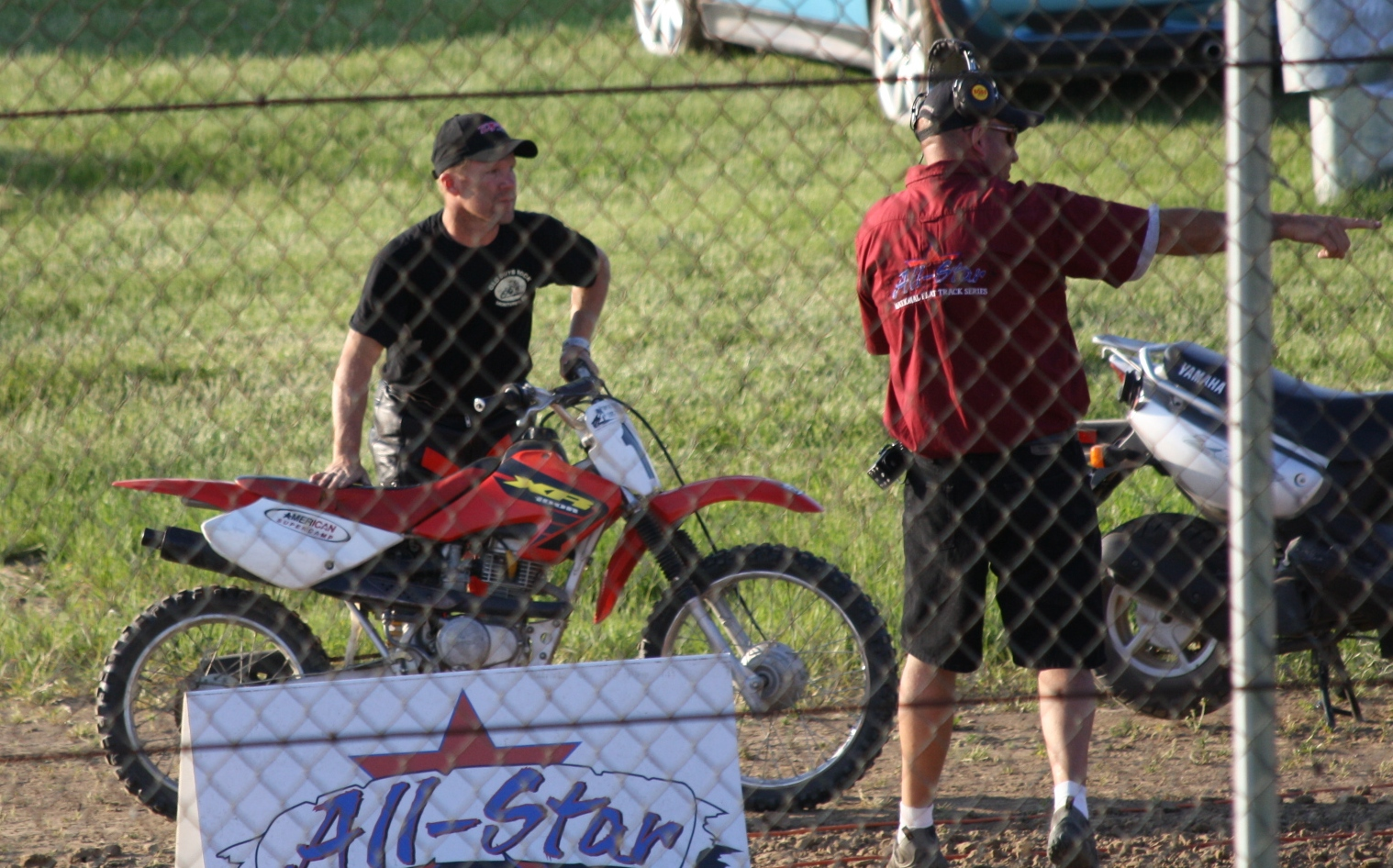
Carr (left) during his 2011 farewell tour

Carr began his racing career as an amateur racer in 1983. He turned professional in 1985, finishing seventh in the Grand National Championship earning him the A.M.A. Rookie of the Year Award. Carr won his first Grand National in August 1986 at the Peoria TT and finished the season ranked fourth in the championship. He slowly climbed the points standing each year. In 1989, he became a member of the Harley-Davidson factory racing team. After finishing second to his Harley-Davidson teammate, Scott Parker in 1990 and 1991, he finally claimed the Grand National Championship in 1992. He ran the Grand National Series full-time until 1995 where he finished third while winning rookie of the year in the AMA Superbike road racing series. Carr left the dirt tracks to go road racing for two years (1996 and 1997).

Carr won the 1992, 1999, and 2001-2005 AMA Grand National Dirt Track (Flat Track) championships, the 2000 Formula USA Dirt Track Championship and the AMA 600cc Dirt Track championship seven times (1988–1993, and 1995).

Carr was in contention for the 2006 Grand National Championship at the final race at Scioto Downs in Columbus, Ohio before dropping out with mechanical problems. He ended the season tied for fourth in points behind chief rival Kenny Coolbeth.

Carr was inducted into the A.M.A. Motorcycle Hall of Fame in 2004.

== Land speed record ==
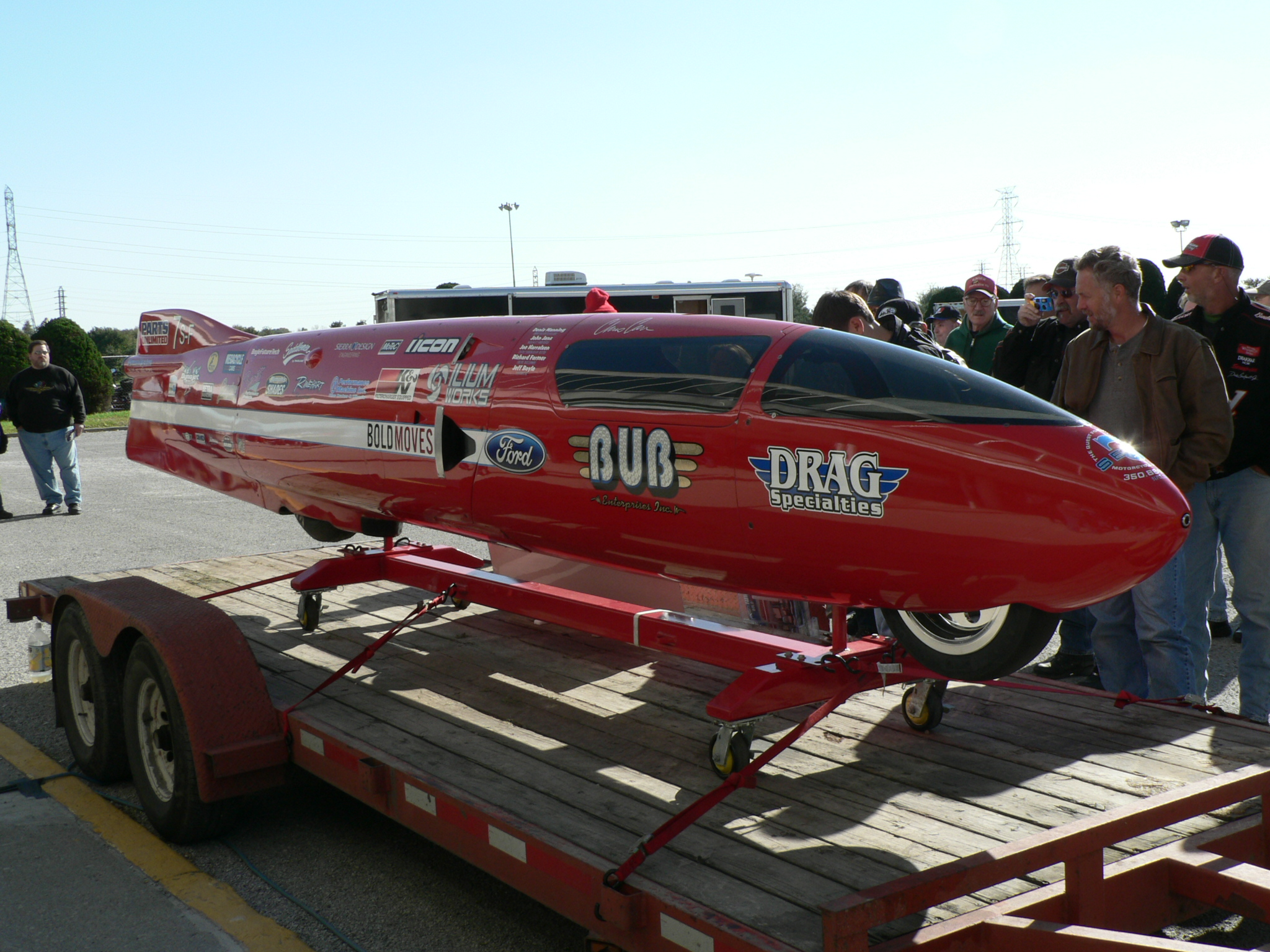
World Record Motorcycle on display

On September 5, 2006, Carr broke the motorcycle land speed world record at the Bonneville Salt Flats (Utah), with a two-pass 350.8 mph (562.6 km/h) average. He was the first motorcyclist to break the 350 mph barrier. Carr's fastest run was at 354 mph (567.8 km/h).

On September 28, 2008, Rocky Robinson broke Carr's record driving the Top 1 Oil Ack Attack streamliner. Carr regained the title on 24 September 2009 with a speed of 367.382 mph.(Pending FIM ratification). This was later topped by Rocky Robinson and the Top 1 Ack Attack team on Sept. 25, 2010. Robinson set a new record of 376.363 mph (kilo average)(Pending FIM ratification) and had an exit speed of 394 mph.

== Educational activities ==
Carr is part owner of American Supercamp, a nationally renowned dirt track school taught on 80cc-230cc bikes.

== Awards ==
Carr was inducted into the Motorsports Hall of Fame of America on March 17, 2020.

== Personal life ==
Away from the track, Carr is an active golfer and reader.
