= Bert le Vack =

British motorcycle racer (1888–1931)

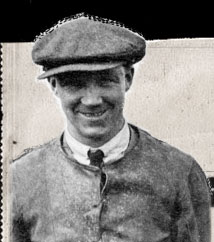
- Born: 1888; London, England
- Died: 16 September 1931 (aged 42–43) near Bern, Switzerland
- Occupations: Racer and specialist engine tuner
- Known for: Motorcycle racing and world records

Herbert 'Bert' le Vack (1888 – 16 September 1931) was a motorcycle world speed record holder throughout the 1920s and earned the nickname the 'Wizard of Brooklands' for his exploits at Brooklands.

An expert racing engine tuner, le Vack worked for some of the great marques and in the late 1920s joined Motosacoche in Switzerland as the works rider, chief designer and tuner. Le Vack was killed in a sidecar accident on 16 September 1931 near Bern, but is generally regarded as being one of the greatest racing motorcyclists of his day.

== Life ==
Bert le Vack was born in North London and was of Scottish descent, the son of an upholsterer and antique dealer Albert Edward le Vack. Bert's grandfather was John le Vack, a Scottish steam locomotive engineer, who moved to London from his birthplace in Caithness. Bert's first job was with Legros and Knowles, of Willesden Junction. He moved on to work for Daimler, Napier and the London General Omnibus Company. Le Vack began his racing career on bicycles but once he visited Brooklands he began tuning motorcycles and won the first hill climb he entered on a 1909 Triumph. In 1912, he competed in the London to Edinburgh Run and in 1913 he was working with another JAP test rider at Brooklands called John Wallace, who was sacked for being 'under age'. On the outbreak of World War I, they both joined Scottish car makers Arrol-Johnston and turned their talents to designing, assembling and testing aero engines. Wallace founded Duzmo Motorcycles In the 1914 Senior TT, he averaged 45 mph (72 km/h) and won a gold medal.

After the war, le Vack had his own garage and it was a chance exchange of a Scott for an MAG-engined Edmund that re-awakened his interest in motorcycle racing. Tuning up the Edmund led to the neglect of his business, so when he had an offer of employment from Wallace he agreed and began developing Duzmo engines. He then built a competition motorcycle that he used in competitions and demonstrations. He called the bike the 'Ace' and then it became the 'Duzmo' in 1920 when Bert became well known as a racer.

Towards the end of 1920, Bert moved to the Hendee Manufacturing Co, who made Indian motorcycles in Springfield, Massachusetts. He joined their London Depot and developed the eight valve Indian engine. Bert married Ethel Dale in 1912 and there were four children. He divorced Ethel in 1929 and later remarried.

Le Vack was very much in favour of using alcohol-based fuels in racing and obtained supplies from a London distillery. This led to an offer to work as an engine designer for John A. Prestwich, founder of the JAP company who produced racing engines for many top marques, including Brough Superior. Le Vack used his experience of the Indian Powerplus on which he won the famous 500-Mile Race at Brooklands in 1921 to help JAP develop their British vee-twin into what he called a "Yank-buster" – the 'Super Big Twin', so called because of its 986 cc ohv engine. (Indian subsequently dropped out of international competition).

Although le Vack only stayed with JAP for four years he played a significant part in their success and JAP advertisements in the Motor Cycle showed Bert on a Brough Superior with the 976 cc vee-twin JAP engine. As well as his tuning knowledge, le Vack gained a reputation for blending special racing fuels and had his own workshop in the Tottenham factory. Described as a quietly spoken man with few friends, le Vack became something of an enigma. in a rare interview for The Motor Cycle in 1923 with the title 'The Making of a Speed Man', he described his early days when he nearly blew himself up by looking into a petrol tank at night with a match.

On 1 January 1930, le Vack joined Motosacoche in Geneva, Switzerland, for whom he had already ridden in the 1914 Isle of Man Tourist Trophy. Motosacoche built racing motorcycles and le Vack joined as the works rider, chief designer and tuner and was killed in the Swiss Alps on 16 September 1931, while driving a motorcycle combination, 16 km from Bern on a business trip to Geneva, accompanied by a Bosch engineer as his passenger. He appears to have had a stroke or heart attack, which caused the outfit to swerve off the road, hitting a tree. Both Le Vack and Passenger were thrown off. Le Vack broke his neck, but the passenger was uninjured. The event was reported in the Journal de Geneva of 17 September 1931. His ashes were returned to England and interred near Brooklands in St Mary's churchyard, Byfleet not far from the grave of racing driver Parry Thomas. The inscription on his gravestone simply states 'In Loving Memory of Herbert Le Vack, Dearly Beloved Husband of Mary Helen Le Vack, Who Died in Switzerland, 16 September 1931'.

== Racing career ==
Le Vack rode for Brough Superior and helped keep T. E. Lawrence's Broughs tuned. He also rode for the leading manufacturers of the 1920s, including Indian, New Imperial and Zenith, After a time in Birmingham at the New Hudson works, Bert went to Motosacoche and rode for them in the 1914 Isle of Man Tourist Trophy Races. Le Vack won the Brooklands 500 in 1921 on a 1000 cc Indian. In 1923, he secured second place in the 1923 Lightweight Tourist Trophy Races with a New Imperial 250 cc – despite a breakdown that meant he had to push the bike half a mile to the finish.

== World records ==
| Year | Place | Country | Motorcycle | Speed |
|---|---|---|---|---|
| 1921 | Brooklands | UK | Indian | 107.5 miles per hour (173.0 km/h) |
| 1923-11-10 | Brooklands | UK | | 108.48 |
| 1924 | Cavendish Drive, Clipstone, Nottinghamshire | UK | Brough Superior | 111.1 m.p.h |
| 1924–7–6 | Arpajon | France | Brough Superior 867 cc | 118.93 |
| 1929–8–25 | Arpajon | France | Brough Superior 995 cc | 129.07 |
| 1927 | Brooklands | England | New Hudson 500 cc | 100 |

== See also ==
- New Hudson Motorcycles
- Brough Superior Motorcycles
- Motorcycle Land-Speed Record
