= Cal Rayborn =

American motorcycle racer

Rayborn with his 1968 Daytona 200 race winner's trophy

Calvin Rayborn II (February 20, 1940 – December 29, 1973 (aged 33)) was a top American professional motorcycle road racer in the 1960s and early 1970s.

Born and raised in San Diego, California, Rayborn began riding motorcycles at an early age. He began his racing career in dirt track events in Southern California and in 1964, he began racing professionally in the A.M.A. Grand National Championship, a series which encompassed events in four distinctive dirt track disciplines plus road racing. Rayborn excelled at road racing, winning his first AMA national at Carlsbad, California in 1966.

Rayborn's prowess on road courses earned him a place on the Harley-Davidson factory racing team. It was with Harley-Davidson that he achieved his greatest success, winning two consecutive Daytona 200 victories in 1968 and 1969. He also set two 1970 motorcycle land speed records. He accomplished an impressive feat when he competed in the Transatlantic Trophy match races in England in 1972. The Transatlantic Trophy pitted the best British riders against the top American road racers. On an outdated motorcycle with no experience on British race tracks, Rayborn won three of the six races.

Rayborn won his last AMA National road race in 1972, at the Laguna Seca racetrack, near Monterey, California. Racing with a modified XRTT-750, it would also be Harley-Davidson's last National road race win.

Towards the end of 1973, it was apparent that the Harley-Davidson team could no longer provide him with a competitive motorcycle for road racing, so Rayborn accepted an offer to race for the Suzuki factory.

In December 1973, Rayborn travelled to New Zealand to compete in an auto racing event. He also accepted an offer to race a Suzuki motorcycle at the Pukekohe Park Raceway outside of Auckland. Rayborn's bike was short of power and top speed so the bike was hurriedly converted to burn methanol fuel. Rayborn started the race and was up with the leaders when the bike's engine seized. In the ensuing crash he slammed into a wall close to the edge of the track and was killed.

Rayborn was inducted into the AMA Motorcycle Hall of Fame in 1999.
