= List of motorcycle land-speed records =

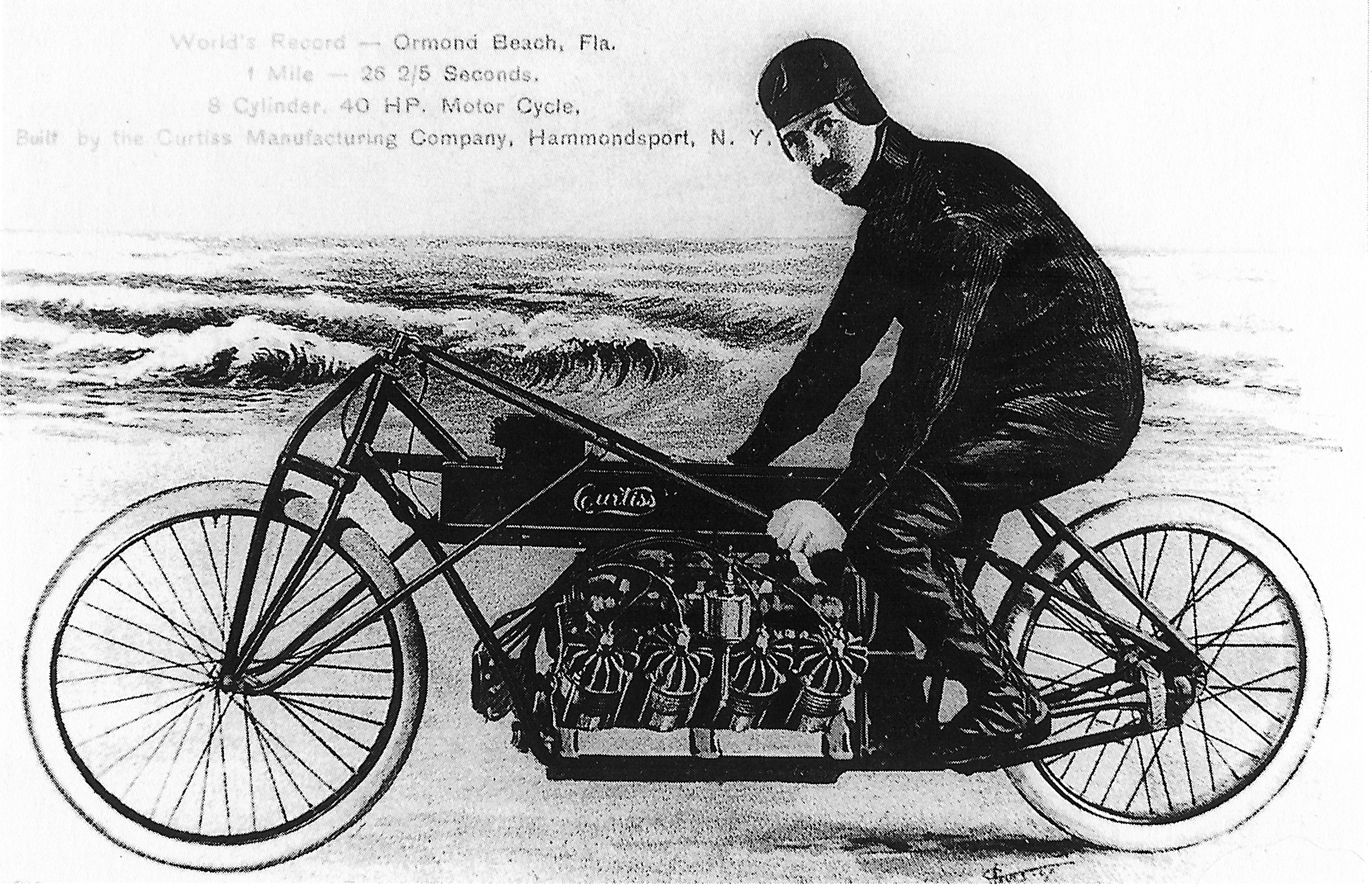
Glenn Curtiss, fastest person on earth, on his V8 motorcycle in 1907

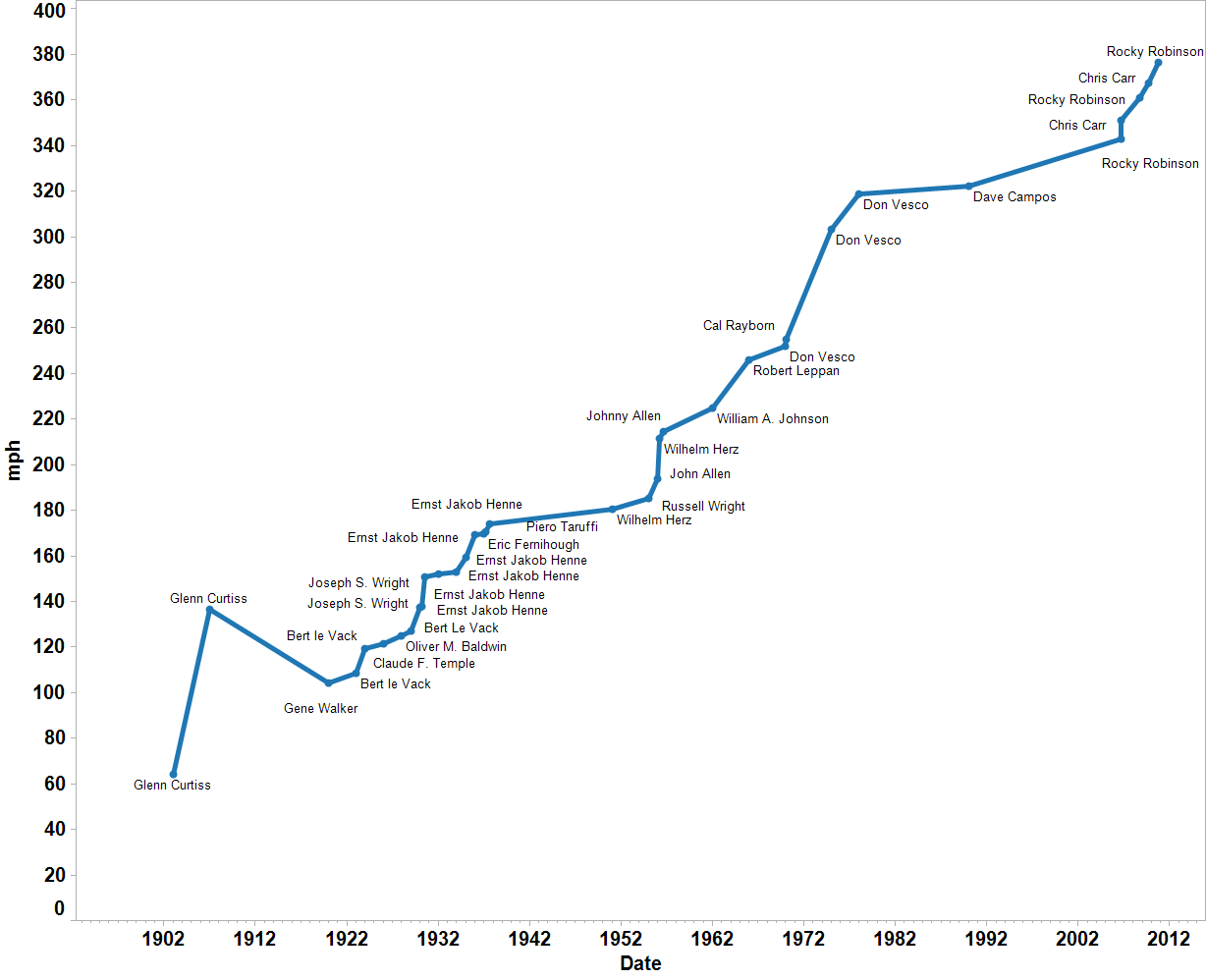
Speed (mph) by year.

The motorcycle land-speed record is the fastest speed achieved by a motorcycle on land. It is standardized as the speed over a course of fixed length, averaged over two runs in opposite directions. AMA National Land Speed Records requires two passes the same calendar day in opposite directions over a timed mile/kilometre while FIM Land Speed World Records require two passes in opposite directions to be over a timed mile/kilometre completed within two hours. These are special or modified motorcycles, distinct from the fastest production motorcycles. The first official FIM record was set in 1920, when Gene Walker rode an Indian on Daytona Beach at 104.12 mph (167.56 km/h). Since late 2010, the Ack Attack team has held the motorcycle land speed record at 376.36 mph (605.69 km/h).

== History ==
The first generally recognized motorcycle speed records were set unofficially by Glenn Curtiss, using engines of his own manufacture, first in 1903, when he achieved 64 mph (103 km/h) at Yonkers, New York using a V-twin, and then on January 24, 1907, on Ormond Beach, Florida, when he achieved 136.27 mph (219.31 km/h) using a V8 housed in a spindly tube chassis with direct shaft drive to the rear wheel. An attempted return run was foiled when his drive shaft came loose at speed, yet he was able to wrestle the machine to a stop without injury. The Curtiss V-8 motorcycle is currently in the Transportation collection of the Smithsonian Institution; a replica was presented in 2025.

Curtiss's 1907 record was for a few years the fastest speed any person had ever travelled under power: the rail record stood at 210.2 km/h (131 mph), achieved in Germany when in 1903 electric powered Experimental three-phase railcars of AEG and Siemens competed. First motor car records had been set in the 1890s by battery electric cars, then bettered by ICE-powered automobiles to 109 mph in 1905, beating steam locomotives. At the time, Europeans used roads in France or beaches in Belgium that soon were too short. The opening of the Brooklands banked oval did not help much regarding overall speed records, as the Blitzen Benz cars were limited by the track in 1909. On long beaches in Florida, a steam car made to win the record did so in 1906, at 127.66 mph (205.45 km/h), but both the steamer and Curtiss were beaten when the Benz cars arrived there in 1911.

In the air, airships were to big to be fast, and airplanes barely did fly in public before 1906. The Wright Brothers claimed to have achieved 37.85 mph (60.91 km/h) in 1905, and resumed flying only in 1908, after air speed records officially recognized by FAI had been set in France. Airplanes gained speed in the early 1910, catching up to land vehicles, then the war broke out. Afterwards, airplanes always were faster, aided by lower drag in altitude, and some vehicles used aircraft powerplants.

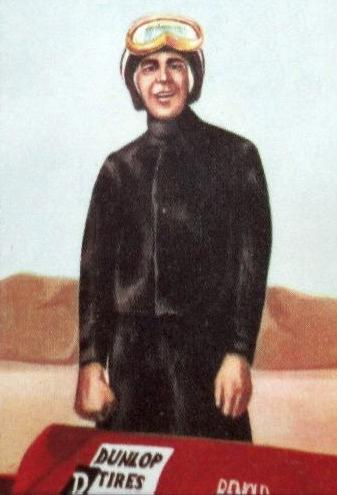
William A. 'Bill' Johnson, USA, Motorcycle land-speed record on 1962-09-09, Bonneville Salt Flats with Dudek Triumph Streamliner

The first officially sanctioned Fédération Internationale de Motocyclisme (FIM) record was set in 1920, when Gene Walker rode an Indian on Daytona Beach at 104.12 mph (167.56 km/h). Curtiss in 1907 had used a large 4-liter V8 aircraft engine not practical for riding on public roads, and it failed on the return run. The first FIM-sanctioned record to exceed his speed did not occur until 1930, at Arpajon in France, when an OEC special with a 1,000cc supercharged JAP V-twin engine averaged 137 mph (220 km/h) over the required two-way runs. The 1930s saw an international battle between the BMWs ridden by Ernst Henne and various JAP-powered British motorcycles, with the penultimate pre-World War II record being taken in 1937 by Italy's Gilera, shortly before BMW set a final pre-war record of 173.68 mph (279.51 km/h) that stood for 14 years.

After World War II, the German NSU factory battled Britain's Vincent HRD and Triumph for top speed honors during the 1950s. The Germans, both customers and manufacturers, soon moved over to the automobile market, and British-engined machines dominated the 1960s records. New Zealand's Burt Munro (of the film The World's Fastest Indian), set a speed record at Bonneville in 1967 of 183 mph (295 km/h) for a motorcycle with an engine under 1000cc.

A Japanese-engined streamliner motorcycle first took the record in 1970, and alternated with Harley-Davidson-engined machines as record-holders until 1990, when Dave Campos's streamliner powered by twin Harley-Davidson engines averaged 322.15 mph (518.45 km/h). That record stood for 16 years before being surpassed in 2006 by the Ack Attack team's twin Suzuki engined machine at an average of 342.8 mph (551.7 km/h). The BUB team, using a custom-built V4 engine, then alternated as record holders with Ack Attack over the next four years. As of April 2026, the Ack Attack team has held the motorcycle land speed record at 376.36 mph (605.69 km/h) since late 2010.

== Jet-engine trike ==
The fastest record certified by the FIM is that set in 1964 by the jet-propelled tricycle, Spirit of America. It set three absolute land speed records, the last at 526.277 miles per hour (846.961 km/h). While such records are usually validated by the Fédération Internationale de l'Automobile, the FIA only certifies vehicles with at least four wheels, while the FIM certifies two- and three-wheelers. Breedlove never intended Spirit of America to be classified as a motorcycle, despite its tricycle layout, and only approached the FIM after being rejected for record status by the FIA. Spirit of America's FIM-ratified record prompted the FIA to add the new category of thrust-powered vehicles to its world record listings. Furthermore, most people think of the tricycle Spirit of America, now part of the permanent collection of Chicago's Griffin Museum of Science and Industry, as a car and not a motorcycle.

== List of AMA National and FIM World Land Speed records ==
Link to Bonneville Motorcycle Speed Trials AMA National and FIM World Records

== List of "absolute" and Streamliner records ==
Date	Location	Rider	Make	Engine displacement cc (cu in)	Speed		Comments
Date	Location	Rider	Make	Engine displacement cc (cu in)	mph	km/h	Comments
1903	Yonkers, New York, US	Glenn Curtiss	Curtiss V-2	1,000 cc (61 cu in)	64	103	over the mile, first (unofficial) World Speed Record, Hercules V-twin
1905	Blackpool, UK - Average Speed over 1,000m on 27 July 1905.	Henri Cissac	Peugeot 1,489cc V twin	1,489cc	87	140	Blackpool Speed Trials
24 January 1907	Ormond Beach, Florida, US	Glenn Curtiss	Curtiss V-8	4,000 cc (240 cu in)	136.27	219.31	Unofficial record stood over 20 years
14 April 1920	Daytona Beach, Florida, US	Gene Walker	Indian	994 cc (60.7 cu in)	103.56	166.66	
6 November 1923	Brooklands, UK	Claude Temple	Anzani		108.48	174.58	
8 June 1924	Arpajon, France	Tommy Turner	AJS Special-AJ Stevens	799 cc (48.8 cu in)	110.66	178.08	
6 July 1924	Arpajon, France	Bert le Vack	Brough Superior-JAP]	867 cc (52.9 cu in)	118.99	191.50	
5 September 1926	Arpajon, France	Claude F. Temple	OEC-Temple	996 cc (60.8 cu in)	121.44	195.44	
25 August 1928	Arpajon, France	Owen M. Baldwin	Zenith-JAP	996 cc (60.8 cu in)	124.27	199.99	
25 August 1929	Arpajon, France	Bert Le Vack	Brough-Superior	995 cc (60.7 cu in)	129.00	207.6	
19 September 1929	Ingolstadt, Germany	Ernst Jakob Henne	BMW WR 750	735 cc (44.9 cu in)	134.67	216.75	The first successful use of a supercharger for a World Record.
31 August 1930	Arpajon, France	Joseph S. Wright	OEC-Temple JAP	994 cc (60.7 cu in)	137.23	220.99	First official record to exceed Curtiss' pioneering effort.
21 September 1930	Ingolstadt, Germany	Ernst Jakob Henne	BMW WR 750	735 cc (44.9 cu in)	137.74	221.67	
6 November 1930	Cork, Ireland	Joseph S. Wright	Zenith JAP	995 cc (60.7 cu in)	150.74	242.59	
2 November 1932	Tát, Hungary	Ernst Jakob Henne	BMW	736 cc (44.9 cu in)	151.86	244.40	
30 October 1934	Gyon, Hungary	Ernst Jakob Henne	BMW	736 cc (44.9 cu in)	153.00	246.23	
27 September 1935	A3 autobahn (Frankfurt-München route), Germany	Ernst Jakob Henne	BMW	736 cc (44.9 cu in)	159.10	256.04	First record over 250 km/h (160 mph)
12 October 1936	A3, Germany	Ernst Jakob Henne	BMW Type 255	493 cc (30.1 cu in)	169.08	272.11	
19 April 1937	Gyon, Hungary	Eric Fernihough	Brough Superior-JAP	995 cc (60.7 cu in)	169.72	273.14	JAP supercharged Fernihough was killed in a 1938 attempt
21 October 1937	Autostrada A4 (Italy) (Brescia-Bergamo route)	Piero Taruffi	Gilera	492 cc (30.0 cu in)	170.37	274.18	Supercharged four-cylinder. Taruffi famous as Grand Prix driver.
28 November 1937	A3, Germany	Ernst Jakob Henne	BMW	495 cc (30.2 cu in)	173.68	279.50	Last pre-World War II record
1951	A9 autobahn (Ingolstadt-München route), Germany	Wilhelm Herz	NSU Delphin I streamliner	499 cc (30.5 cu in)	180.29	290.322	First post-World War II record
1955	Swannanoa, New Zealand	Russell Wright	Vincent-HRD	998 cc (60.9 cu in)	184.83	297.640	
25 September 1955	Bonneville, US	John Allen	Triumph	649 cc (39.6 cu in)	192.719	310.151	Unratified by FIM^{[a]}
2 August 1956	Bonneville, US	Wilhelm Herz	NSU Delphin III streamliner	499 cc (30.5 cu in)	189.5	304.97	
4 August 1956	Bonneville, US	Wilhelm Herz	NSU Delphin III streamliner	499 cc (30.5 cu in)	210.64	338.992	First record over 200 mph (320 km/h)
6 September 1956	Bonneville, US	Johnny Allen	Triumph Tiger T110	649 cc (39.6 cu in)	214.4	345.188	Unratified by FIM^{[b]}
5 September 1962	Bonneville, US	William A. Johnson	Triumph	650 cc (40 cu in)	224.57	361.41	
1966	Bonneville, US	Robert Leppan	Triumph Special Gyronaut X-1 streamliner	1,298 cc (79.2 cu in)	245.667	395.36	Triumph Special twin-engined
1970	Bonneville, US	Don Vesco	Yamaha "Big Red" streamliner	700 cc (43 cu in)	251.66	405.25	Two-stroke twin-engined First record over 250 mph (402 km/h)
1970	Bonneville, US	Cal Rayborn	Harley-Davidson streamliner	1,480 cc (90 cu in)	265.492	410.37	single nitro-fueled Sportster engine nicknamed 'Godzilla' built by Warner Riley.
28 September 1975	Bonneville, US	Don Vesco	Yamaha "Silver Bird" streamliner	1,480 cc (90 cu in)	302.92	487.515	First record over 300 mph (483 km/h)
28 August 1978	Bonneville, US	Don Vesco	Lightning Bolt streamliner	2,030 cc (124 cu in)	318.598	509.757	Turbocharged twin Kawasaki Kz1000 engines. First record over 500 km/h (311 mph)
14 July 1990	Bonneville, US	Dave Campos	Easyriders streamliner	3,000 cc (180 cu in)	322.150	518.450	Twin Harley-Davidson engines. Longest held official record, 16 years (see Curtiss' 20 year unofficial record)
3 September 2006	Bonneville, US	Rocky Robinson	TOP 1 Oil-Ack Attack streamliner	2,600 cc (160 cu in)	342.797	551.678	Twin Suzuki engines
5 September 2006	Bonneville, US	Chris Carr	BUB Seven Streamliner	2,997 cc (182.9 cu in)	350.884	564.693	BUB/Sierra Design V4
26 September 2008	Bonneville, US	Rocky Robinson	TOP 1 Oil-Ack Attack streamliner	2,600 cc (160 cu in)	360.913	580.833	Twin Suzuki engines
24 September 2009	Bonneville, US	Chris Carr	BUB Seven Streamliner	2,997 cc (182.9 cu in)	367.382	591.244	BUB/Sierra Design V4
25 September 2010	Bonneville, US	Rocky Robinson	TOP 1 Oil-Ack Attack streamliner	2,600 cc (160 cu in)	376.363	605.697	Twin Suzuki engines First record over 600 km/h (373 mph)

== Notes ==
a. At the time, it had been the accepted practice that the FIM would require the American Automobile Association to carry out official timing for any run in the USA. However shortly before the record attempt the A.A.A. had withdrawn from controlling motor sport, leaving no official body representing the FIM. Although every effort had been made to show the impartiality of the officials and the accuracy of the equipment, after several months the claimed record was not accepted by the FIA as the timing was "not carried out by an official certified by the FIM.".

b. The issues with official FIM timing of runs in the US were still not resolved at this time. NSU had solved the problem for their runs in August by including accredited timekeepers and officials in the team that they bought over with them from Europe. The British Motor Corporation had also been attempting record runs that year, and the FIA arranged for a British timekeeper to go to America for these. The equipment he had used for timing the runs was tested and approved by the FIA. However he had to leave America before Allen could make his run, and so the same equipment was used by two Americans who had been given written authority to act as timekeepers on behalf of the FIM. At the FIM meeting in Paris in October, the FIM postponed approval of the record, alleging that the timekeeper was not recognised by the FIM and that no official FIM observer had been present. After further deliberation and investigation, the FIM announced in April 1957 that they were unable to ratify the record claimed as the equipment used had not been approved by them.

== See also ==
- List of fastest production motorcycles
