= Motosacoche =

MOTOSACOCHE
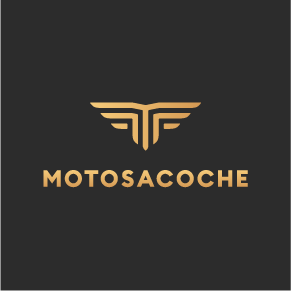
- New Motosacoche logo from 01.08.2021
- Company type: Privately held company
- Founded: 1901
- Founder: Henri & Armand Dufaux
- Headquarters: Geneva
- Key people: Paul Merz CEO

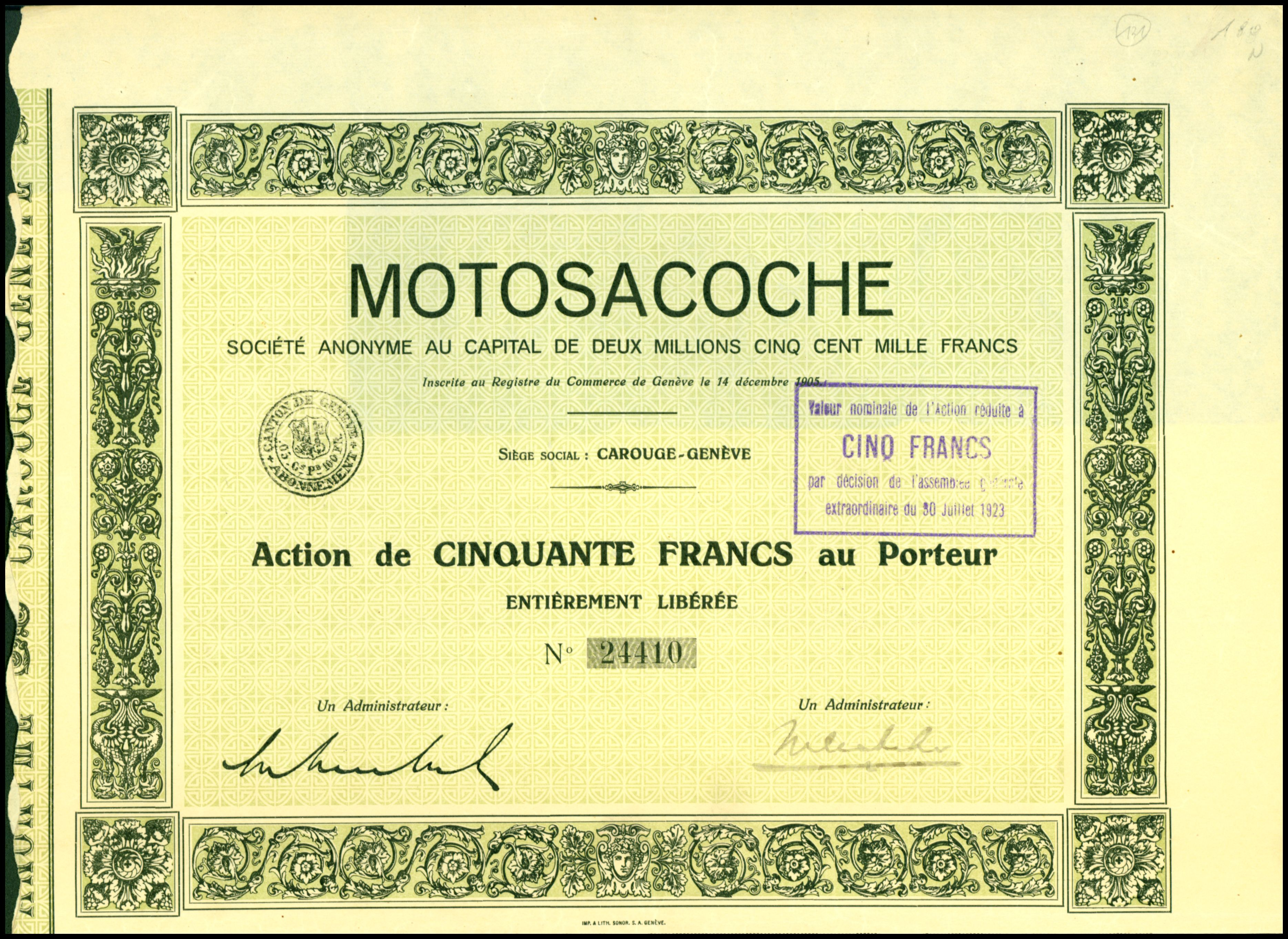
Share of the Motosacoche SA, issued 1905

Motosacoche was founded in 1899, by Henri and Armand Dufaux, in Geneva, Switzerland. Motosacoche was once the biggest Swiss motorcycle manufacturer, known also for its MAG (Motosacoche Acacias Genève) engines, used by other European motorcycle manufacturers.

== History ==
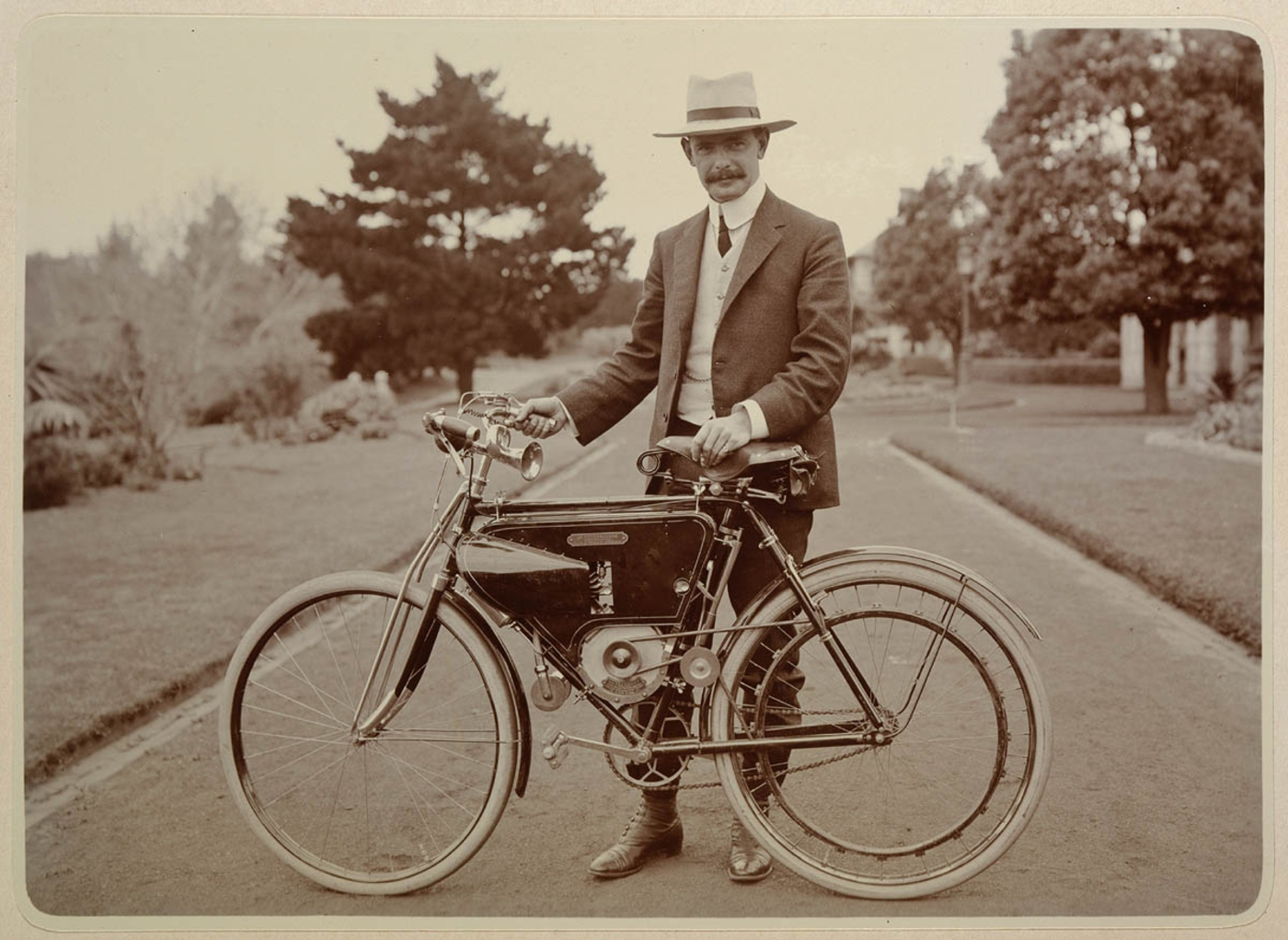
Dr Connolly's Motosacoache motorcycle, Callan Hospital, Sydney, c. 1908

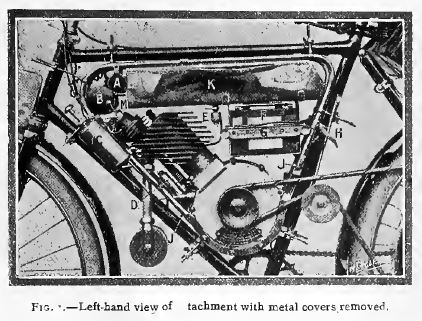
Details of a 1907 Motosacoche unit (covers removed)

From 1900 Motosacoche produced a bicycle auxiliary engine in a subframe that could be installed into a conventional bicycle. The details of the engine were hidden behind covers, and to some this looked like an engine in a bag, hence the Motosacoche name, meaning "engine in a bag".

In 1910 Royal Enfield used Motosacoche 344 cc 2.75 hp engines in a successful V-twin model. They are reputed to have supplied Triumph, Ariel, Matchless and Brough-Superior with engines at times too, first through H & A Dufaux England Ltd, and then, by 1912, Motosacoche Ltd (GB), with Osborne Louis De Lissa. Motosacoche had factories in Switzerland, France and Italy, and supplied MAG engines to continental manufacturers including Clement, Condor, Imperia, Neander and Monet Goyon.

When the Bol d'Or 24-hour event was first held on the outskirts of Paris in 1922 the winning rider covered more than 750 miles (1,210 kilometres) on a 500 cc Motosacoche.

In 1928 they made a name in the Grand Prix, with the Motosacoche 350 M 35 ohc racing bike, built by Dougal Marchant of England, ridden to two European championship titles, 350 and 500, by Wal Handley.

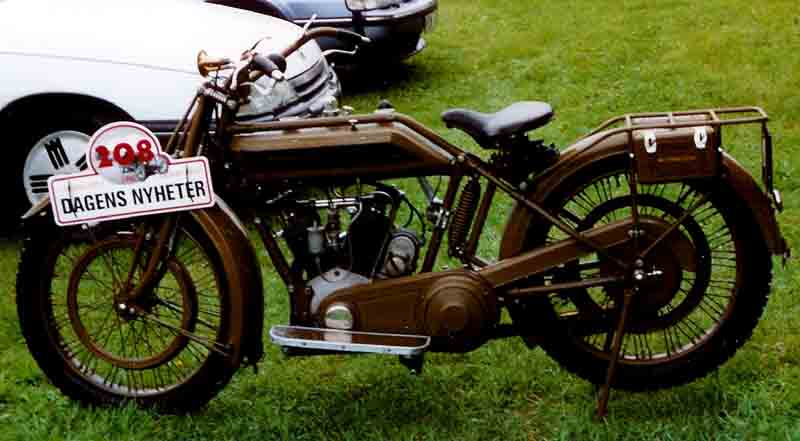
Motosacoche 2 C 10 Sport 500 cc 1925

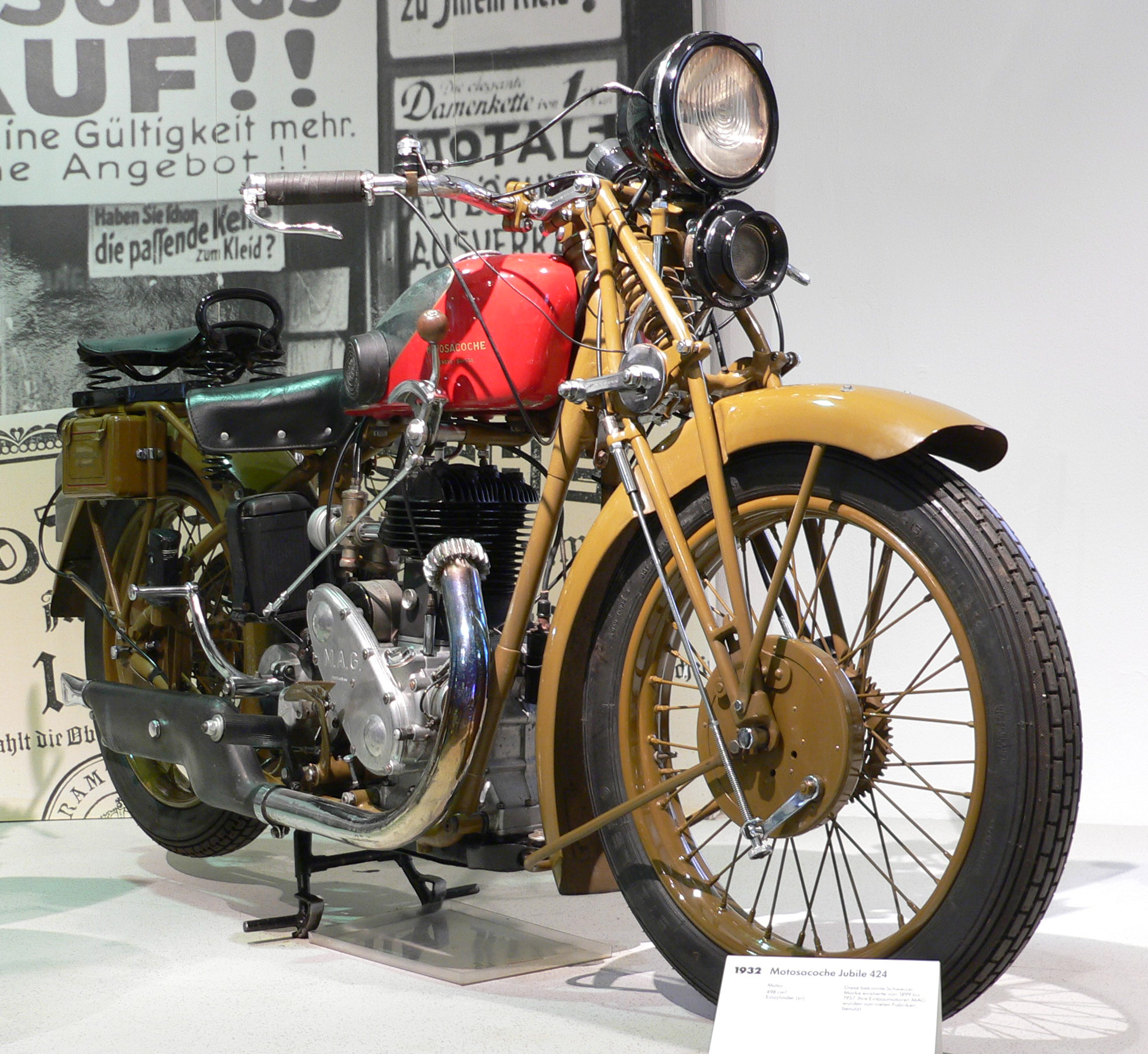
1932 Motosacoche Jubile 424

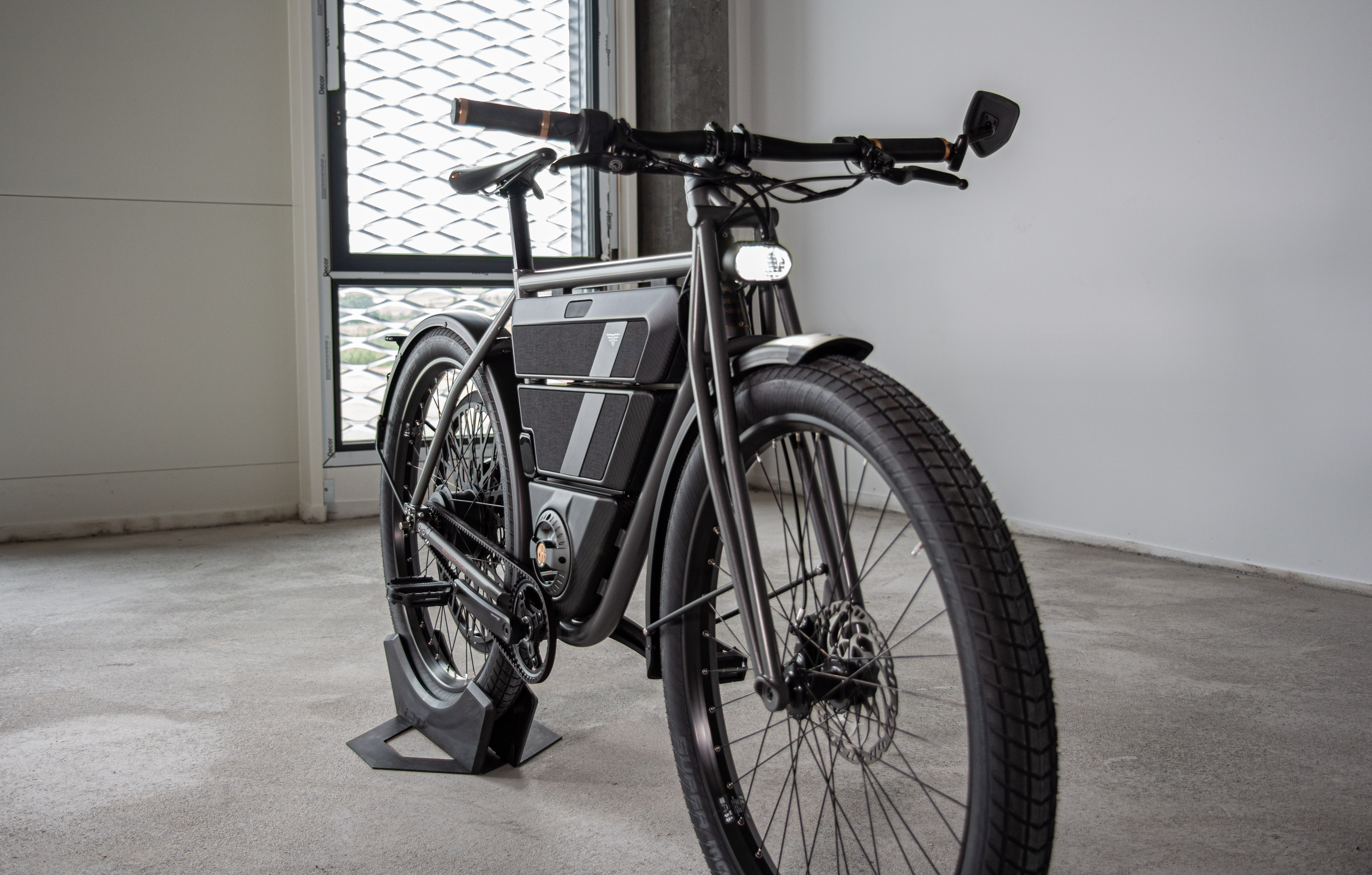
2024 Electric Type-A

Bert le Vack joined Motosacoche in 1930. He had ridden in the 1914 Isle of Man Tourist Trophy and became the works rider, chief designer and tuner. Le Vack was killed in an accident in the Swiss Alps on 17 September 1931, while testing the Motosacoche A 50 near Bern. He was to present the motorbike to a Swiss Army officer.

During the 1930s Motosacoche were eclipsed by the Norton Motorcycle Company and went into decline. After World War II, an unusual Marchant-designed 200 cc sv was shown in 1947, but not produced. In 1953 Richard Kuchen-designed German UT motorcycles were marketed under the Motosacoche name, but this was unsuccessful, and by 1956 motorcycles were no longer produced, but MAG stationary and industrial motors continued.

Motosacoche SA, a Swiss company based in Geneva, holds the historic Motosacoche brand. Founded in 2020 by Swiss entrepreneur Paul Merz, the company revitalized the marque with a focus on modern electric mobility. In 2021, Motosacoche SA unveiled its first prototype, an e-bike, marking its reintroduction to the market. That same year, the official history of the brand, Motosacoche: The Story of the Legendary Swiss Motorcycle (in French), authored by Sandra Ansanay-Alex, was published in a limited edition of 1,000 copies, which has since sold out.

After completing the European Union’s homologation process, Motosacoche SA commenced commercial production, delivering of its Type-A model to customers in January 2025. This milestone marked the brand’s return to serial manufacturing after decades of dormancy.

== Models ==
=== Fuel engines ===
- Type-A, 1901 - 1910,
- D4, Motosacoche for women 1908,
- 2C10, 1911,
- Autosacoche, 1913
- 1C9H Sport, 1928–39, 498 cc, o.h.v.,20 hp
- 2 Cylinders, 1930 & 1932
- 209, 1928
- 210, 1928 & 1929
- 212 twin, 1954, 247 cc, o.h.c
- 2C7, 1914, 496 cc, s.v.
- 304 Tourer, 1927, 346 cc, i.o.e.
- 309, 1928
- 310, 1928 & 1929
- 310 BL, 1933
- 318, 1933
- 319, 1933
- 322 Competition, 1933
- 350 Competition, 1930 & 1932
- 350 Sport, 1930 & 1932
- 350 Tourer, 1930 & 1932
- 409, 1928 & 1929
- 409 BL, 1933
- 410, 1928 & 1929
- 410 LL, 1933
- 419, 1933
- 420, 1933
- 422 Competition, 1933
- 425 Luxe, 1933
- 426 Luxe, 1933
- 439 Tourisme Luxe, 1939, 498 cc, s.v.
- 500 Competition, 1930 & 1932
- 500 Sport, 1930 & 1932
- 500 Touring, 1930 & 1932
- 720, 1933
- 720 Tourisme Grand Luxe, 1939, 846 cc, s.v.
- A1, 1908, 214 cc, a.i.o.e
- A50 (works racer), 1928, o.h.c.
- BL, 1929 & 1930
- Jubilee Sport, 1931, 498 cc, o.h.v.
- L, 1928
- R10H, 1929
- R14H, 1929 & 1930
- R14K, 1929
- R9K, 1930
- 877TL, 1931 & 1932

=== Electric engines ===
- Type-A, 2024
