= Streamlined motorcycle =

Aerodynamic motorcycle

A streamlined motorcycle is a motorcycle with a fairing that goes beyond a 'full' or 'dustbin' fairing, to form an aerodynamic shell to minimize drag. This helps attaining higher top speeds, as in the motorcycle land-speed record, or increased energy efficiency, as in the Craig Vetter Fuel Economy Challenge. Often they are feet forwards motorcycles or have the rider in a prone position, rather than upright, to reduce the frontal area exposed to headwind.

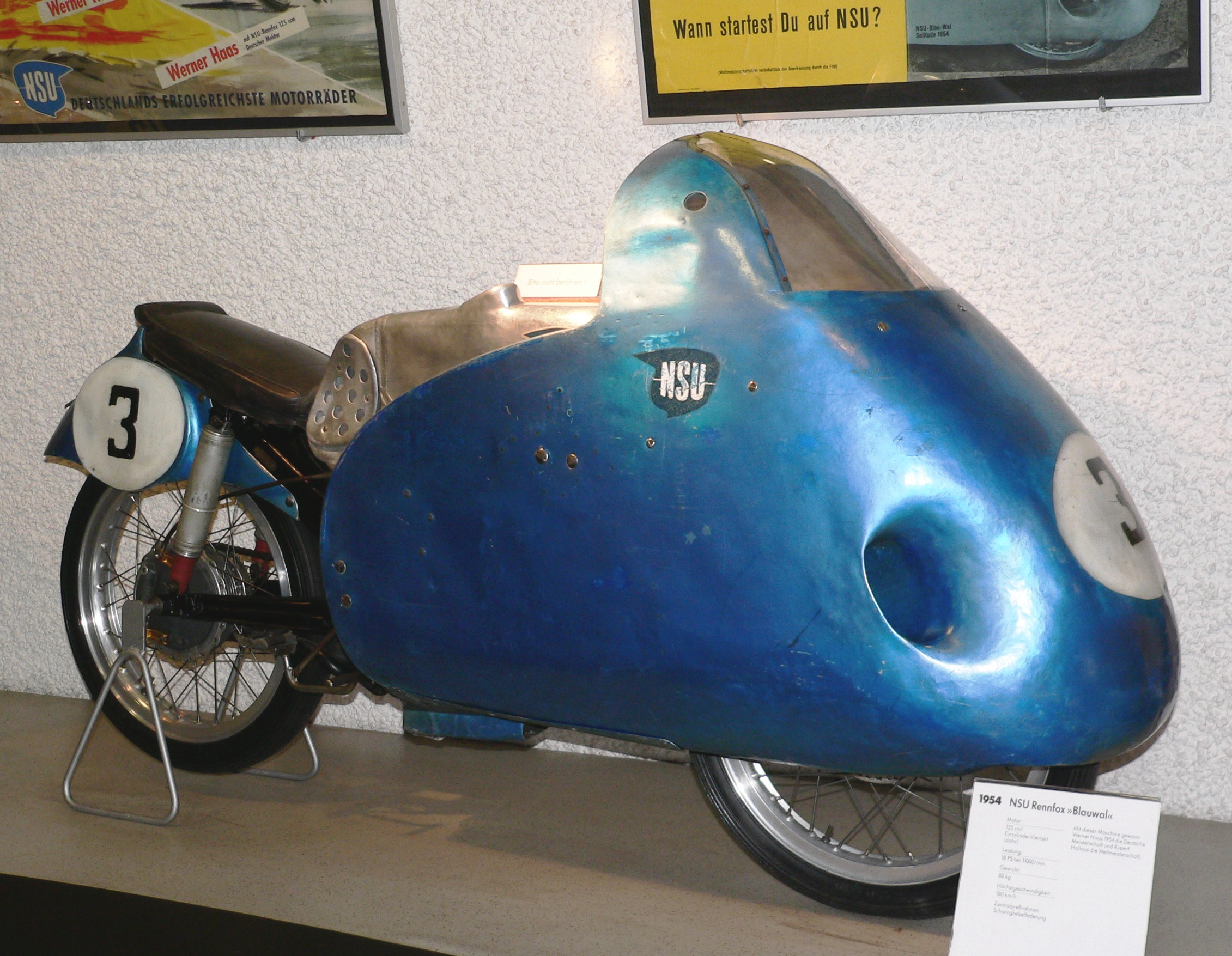
NSU Rennfox G.P. 125 O.H.C. TWIN (1954)

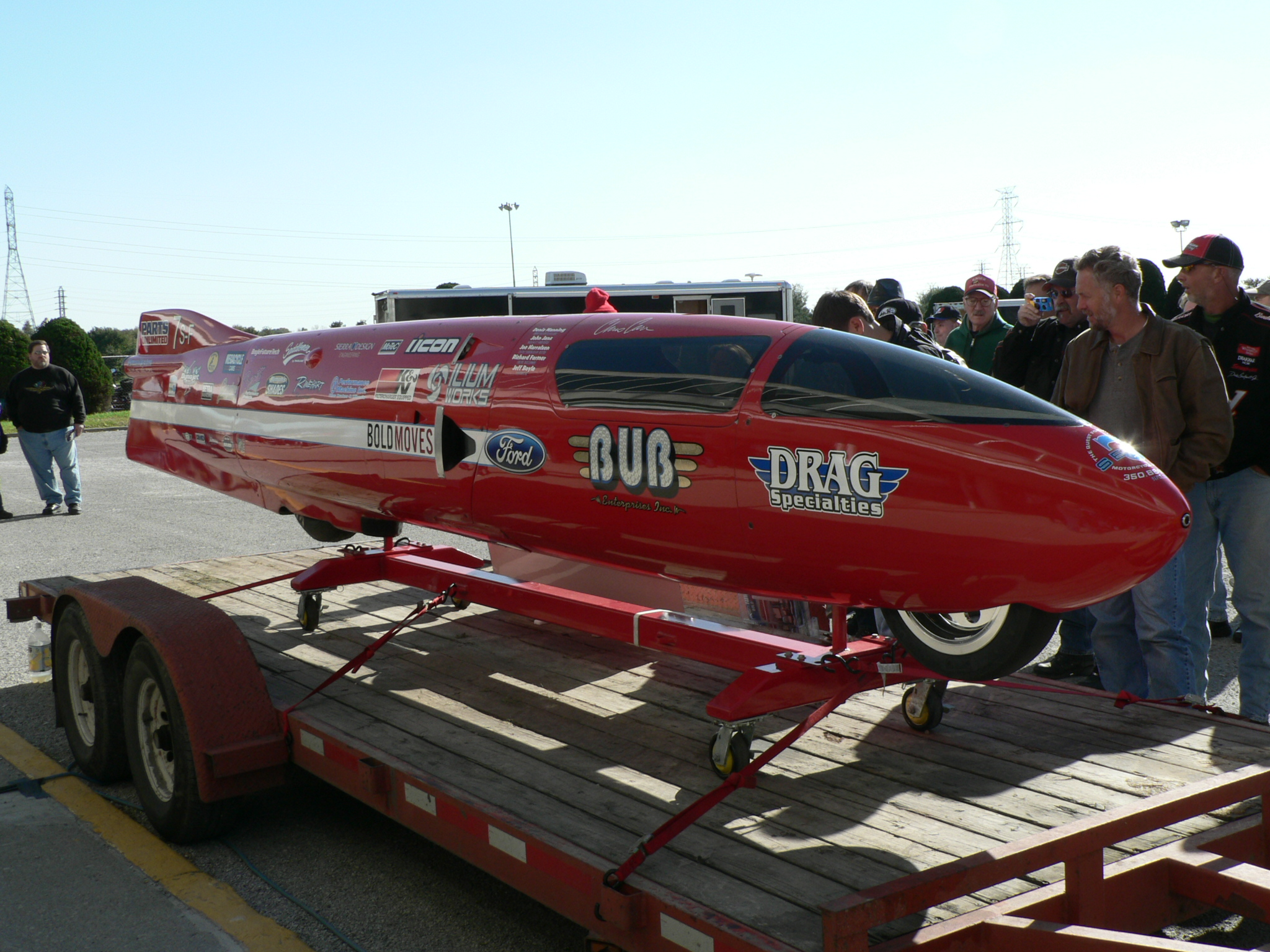
BUB Seven Streamliner

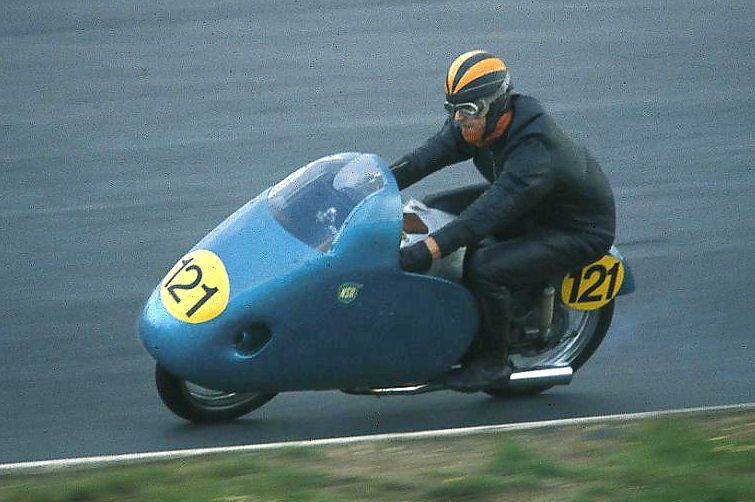
NSU Rennmax G.P. 250 O.H.C. TWIN (1954)

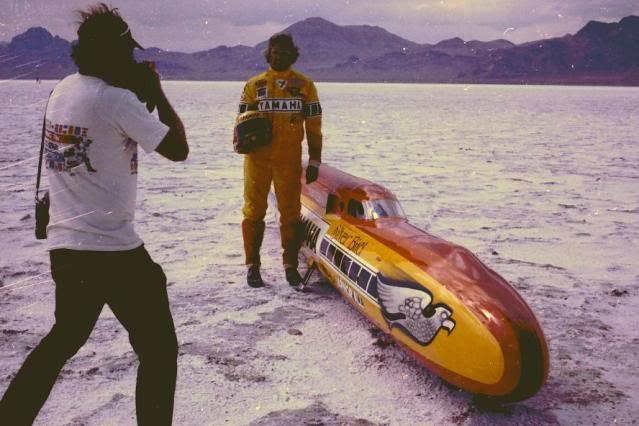
Silver Bird streamliner
