= Land speed racing =

Form of motorsport

Land speed racing is a form of motorsport.

Land speed racing is best known for the efforts to break the absolute land speed record, but it is not limited to specialist vehicles.

A record is defined as the speed over a course of fixed length, averaged over two runs (commonly called "passes"). Under current FIA rules, two runs are required in opposite directions within one hour, over a timed mile and a new record mark must exceed the previous one by at least one percent to be validated. Records are set in either the flying kilometre or flying mile. Motorcycle land speed racing requires 2 passes the same calendar day in opposite directions over a timed mile/km for AMA National Land Speed Records while FIM Land Speed World Records require two passes in opposite directions to be over a timed mile/km completed within 2 hours.

== History ==
The sport's origins date to the 1930s with the Mormon Meteor at Bonneville Speedway in Utah and in California, when the Southern California Timing Association first held meets for a variety of hot rodded vehicles.

The SCTA began hosting Speed Week at Bonneville in August 1949 (then called the Bonneville Nationals), and have done so every year since, celebrating their seventy-fifth anniversary in 2023. Top speed of the year earns an SCTA tropy; for the inaugural year, it went to Alex Xydias and Dean Batchelor for the So-Cal streamliner, with a speed of 193.54 mph (311.47 km/h). Since then, the trophy has gone to Mickey Thompson, Art Arfons, the Summers Brothers, Don Vesco, Al Teague, and ten-time winner George Poteet, among others. The 2023 trophy was awarded to Chris Raschke in Speed Demon (the team's eleventh win), with a pass of 333.35 mph (536.47 km/h).

Any vehicle – car, truck, or motorcycle – able to meet the class requirements and safety regulations has been able to make an attempt to break the existing record. For automobiles running under FIA sanctioning, the record is set by averaging two runs (commonly called "passes"), one in either direction, within the space of two hours. All vehicles are separated by classes based on displacement. Vintage engines, like the Ford Flathead, Buick Straight Eight, Stovebolt engine and others are raced in the vintage classes. These consist of:

- XF: Ford Flathead
- XO: Overhead valve engines and non Ford flatheads built up to 1959.
- XXF: Ford flatheads with overhead valve head conversions.
- XXO: Overhead valve engines with specialist cylinder heads.
- V4: Vintage four cylinder engines made before 1935. Overhead valve/Overhead cam conversions permitted.
- V4F: Vintage flathead four cylinder engines built before 1935, valvetrain must remain a valve in block.

== Women's record ==
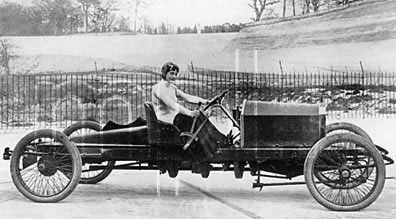
Dorothy Levitt, in a 26hp Napier, at Brooklands, England, in 1908

In 1906, Dorothy Levitt broke the women's world speed record for the flying kilometer, recording a speed of 91 mph (146.25 km/h) and receiving the sobriquet the "Fastest Girl on Earth". She drove a six-cylinder Napier motorcar, a 100 hp (74.6 kW) development of the K5, in a speed trial in Blackpool.

In 1929, Frenchwoman Hellé Nice broke the female speed record. She reached 122.84 mph (197.7 km/h) in a Bugatti 35B on a 10 km course on the Montlhery track outside Paris. The feat was so great that the newspapers at the time named her "Queen of Speed".

A subsequent record was set by Lee Breedlove, the wife of Craig Breedlove, who piloted her husband's Spirit of America - Sonic 1 to a record of 308.506 mph (496.492 km/h) in 1965. According to author Rachel Kushner, Craig Breedlove had talked Lee into taking the car out for a record attempt in order to monopolize the salt flats for the day and block one of his competitors from making a record attempt.

For 43 years, the world record was held by Kitty O'Neil with a speed of 512.710 mph (825.127 km/h), in the jet-powered SMI Motivator, set at the Alvord Desert in 1976.

On August 20, 2019, 43 years later, American professional racer, television personality, and metal fabricator Jessi Combs attempted to break Kitty's long-standing world record at the age of 39 and at the same location. Combs died after her car suffered a mechanical failure on her second run from the opposite direction (used to establish an average to account for wind); the mechanical failure (located on the front wheel assembly) was speculated to have been caused by hitting an object in the desert. Despite dying during the execution of the run, her record attempt was eventually validated, and her new time was posthumously ratified by Guinness on 25 June 2020, ten months after the fatal attempt. Her time was recorded as 522.783 mph (841.338 km/h), which is more than 10 mph faster than Kitty O'Neil's historic record.

== Records by class ==
=== 1960–present wheel driven cars ===
There is no "wheel-driven" category as such. The Fédération Internationale de l'Automobile validates records in a variety of classes, of which the "wheel-driven" classes are in Category A (Special cars) and Category B (Production cars). The accepted record is fastest average speed recorded over any one-mile or one-kilometer distance, averaged over two runs in opposite directions (to factor out wind) within one hour of each other. The most recent wheel-driven record holders have been from a variety of different classes within Category A.

Burkland's 411 Streamliner, driven by Tom Burkland on the Bonneville Salt Flats, holds the current piston-engined wheel-driven land speed record

In 2008, Tom Burkland broke the piston-engined wheel-driven record for the flying mile, recording a speed of 415.896 mph (669.320 km/h). He drove the Burkland family streamliner powered by two 450+ cubic inch-displacement supercharged Donovan engines (bought second-hand), with crankshafts bolted together nose-to-nose, running on methanol.

Poteet & Main, Speed Demon driven by George Poteet on the Bonneville Salt Flats in 2010

In September 2010, George Poteet made an attempt to break the piston-engined wheel-driven record for the flying mile and flying kilometer. His car, Speed Demon, built by Ron Main, is powered by a 299 cu in (4,900 cc) aluminum block 'Hellfire' V8, built by Kenny Duttweiler. Their effort was thwarted by a number of parts failures. The team stated their intention to return in 2011 to set a record over 450 mph (724 km/h), and at the 2011 Bonneville Speed Week, Poteet achieved 426 mph (686 km/h)

Treit & Davenport's Viking 31

In 2012, the Target 550 team of Marlo Treit and Les Davenport planned to raise the record for this class to more than 500 mph (800 km/h) in Viking 31, built by Jim Hume. Powered by two Dodge hemis with Whipple supercharger, it has a frontal area of 8.61 sq ft (0.800 m^{2}) and is more than 40 ft (12 m) long. The model was tested in the Western Washington University wind tunnel, with assistance from Michael Seal.

In 2018, the Flashpoint Streamliner exceeded the record but was disqualified after being destroyed on its second pass, as two full successful passes are required to set a record. The car reached 436 and 451 mph on each pass, but was destroyed on the second pass as a result of a tire failure.

Date	Location	Driver	Vehicle	Power	Speed over 1 km		Speed over 1 mile		Notes
Date	Location	Driver	Vehicle	Power	mph	km/h	mph	km/h	Notes
July 17, 1964	Lake Eyre, Australia	(United Kingdom) Donald Campbell	Bluebird CN7	Turboshaft: 1 x 4,000 hp (3,000 kW) Bristol Proteus gas turbine			403.10	648.73	Failed wheel-driven attempt at absolute record set by Spirit of America
November 12, 1965	Bonneville Salt Flats, USA	(United States) Bob Summers	Goldenrod	4 x fuel injected Chrysler 426 hemi V8s			409.277	658.526	Naturally aspirated piston-engine record Group II, Class 11: 2 or 4 stroke engine without supercharger, cylinder capacity > 8000 cm^{3}
August 21, 1991	Bonneville Salt Flats, USA	(United States) Elwin "Al" Teague	Spirit of '76 (Torque Speed-o-Motive streamliner)	14-71-supercharged Chrysler hemi V8	425.050	684.052	409.978	659.796	Piston-engined record Group I, Class 11: 2 or 4 stroke engine with supercharger, cylinder capacity > 8000 cm^{3} until 2008
October 18, 2001	Bonneville Salt Flats, USA	(United States) Don Vesco	Vesco Turbinator	Lycoming T55-L-11A SA	458.196	737.395	458.444	737.794	Group IX, Class 3: gas turbine engine, unloaded weight > 1000 kg
September 26, 2008	Bonneville Salt Flats, USA	(United States) Tom Burkland	Burkland 411 Streamliner	2 x 8-71-supercharged Donovan hemi V8 Engines			415.896	669.319	Piston-engined record Group I, Class 11: 2 or 4 stroke engine with supercharger, cylinder capacity > 8000 cm^{3}
August 25, 2009	Bonneville Salt Flats, USA	(United States) Roger Schroer	Venturi Buckeye Bullet	Electric motor by Venturi Automobiles	303.025	487.672	302.877	487.433	1st electric vehicle to go over 300 mph
August 24, 2010	Bonneville Salt Flats, USA	(United States) Roger Schroer	Venturi Buckeye Bullet	Electric motor by Venturi Automobiles	307.905	495.526	307.666	495.140	
September 21, 2010	Bonneville Salt Flats, USA	(United States) Charles E. Nearburg	Spirit of Rett streamliner	Reher-Morrison Nitrous oxide-injected carbureted DRCE 2 V8 Engine	414.477	667.037	414.316	666.776	Non-supercharged piston-engine record Group II, Class 11:
September 17, 2012	Bonneville Salt Flats, USA	(United States) George Poteet	Speed Demon streamliner	Twin-turbocharged Dart small-block V8	439.562	707.408	439.024	706.540	Group I, Class 10
August 11, 2018	Bonneville Salt Flats, USA	(United States) Danny Thompson	Challenger II	2 x nitromethane-fuelled fuel injected BAE hemi V8s			448.757	722.204	Normally-aspirated piston-engined record with automotive engines

== See also ==
- Drag racing
- Hot rod
- Land speed record
- Street racing
