= Bonneville Speedway =

Motor sports venue in Utah, U.S.

- Bonneville Salt Flats Race Track
- U.S. National Register of Historic Places
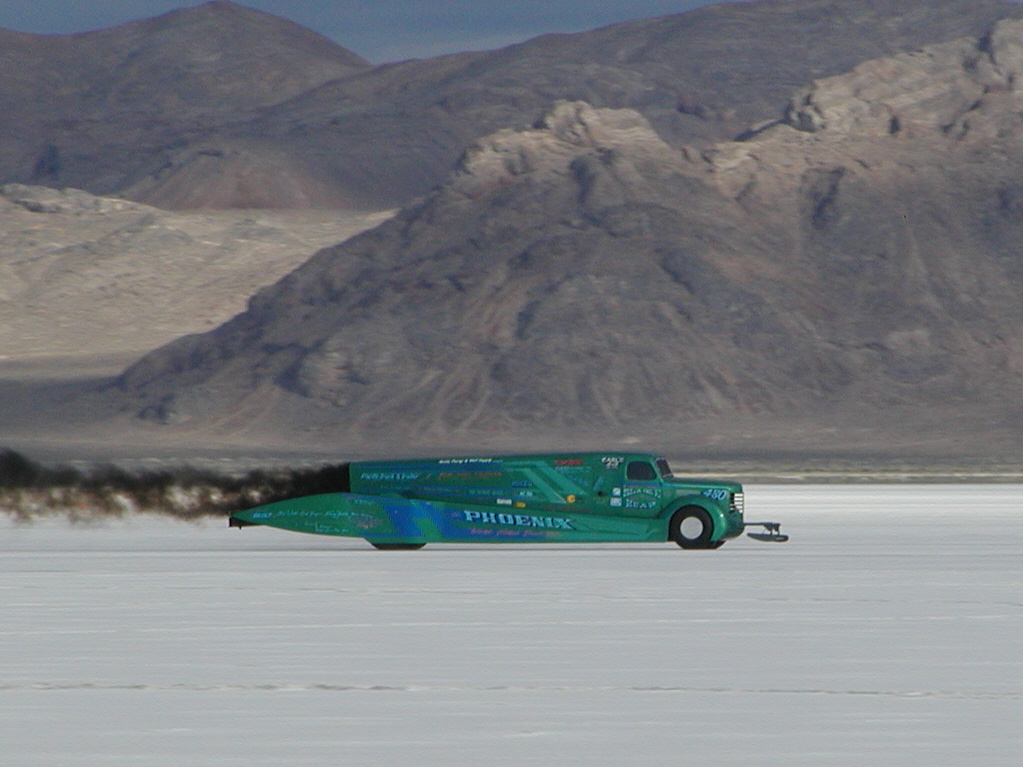
- Phoenix diesel truck running at Bonneville, August 2003

- Location within Utah Location within the United States
- Nearest city: Wendover, Utah
- Coordinates: 40°45′45″N 113°53′44″W
- Area: 36,650 acres (14,830 ha)
- Built: 1911
- NRHP reference No.: 75001826
- Added to NRHP: March 16, 1984

Bonneville Speedway (also known as the Bonneville Salt Flats Race Track) is an area of the Bonneville Salt Flats northeast of Wendover, Utah in the United States, that is marked out for motor sports. It is particularly noted as the venue for numerous land speed records. The Bonneville Salt Flats Race Track is listed on the National Register of Historic Places.

The salt flats were first used for motor sports in 1912, but did not become popular until the 1930s when Ab Jenkins and Sir Malcolm Campbell competed to set land speed records.

A reduction of available racing surface and salt thickness has led to the cancellation of events at Bonneville, such as Speed Week in 2014 and 2015. Available racing surface is much reduced with just 2.5 miles (4.0 km) available instead of the 9-mile (14 km) courses traditionally used for Speed Week.

== Track layouts ==
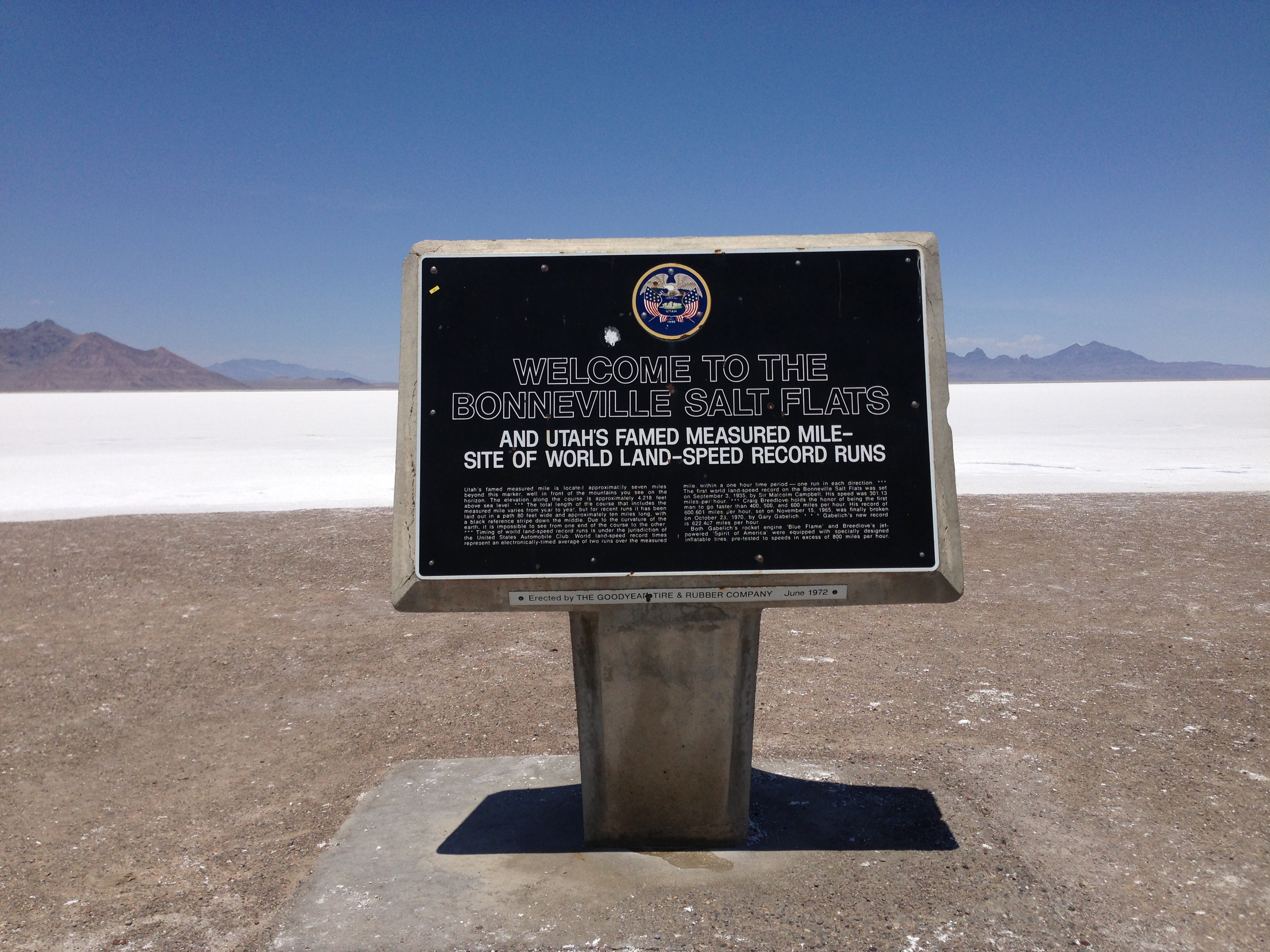
Memorial for the ghost town of Salduro, Utah, near the Bonneville speedway. A rest area on Interstate 80 was built on the former settlement, and a plaque there commemorates the land speed records.

Historically, the speedway was marked out by the Utah Department of Transportation at the start of each summer. Originally, two tracks were prepared; a 10-mile (16 km) long straightaway for speed trials and an oval or circular track for distance runs, which was typically between 10 and 12 miles (16 and 19 km) long depending on the condition of the salt surface.

Since at least the 1990s, track preparations have been the responsibility of the event organizers. Days or weeks in advance, the track preparers identify an area best suited for their track layouts and begin grading the tracks. Surveyors are brought in to survey the timing trap distances. A day before racing begins, the track markers are added.

Originally, the straightaway was marked with a broad black line down its center. This was eventually changed to lines down either side, as the center line wore out too quickly. As the costs for painting the lines has gone up, organizations have switched to flags and cones as track markers. The last event to use black lines was Speed Week, August 2009.

The number of tracks and the timed sections for each track are set according to what is most beneficial for each event. Large public meets such as Speed Week run as many as four tracks with several timed miles, usually starting with the second mile and running to the fifth mile. Smaller meets that typically only run world record attempts will utilize a single track, with one timed mile and one timed kilometer in the middle of the track. Additional marks and cones indicate the end of the track and the position of timing equipment.

== Deteriorating track conditions ==
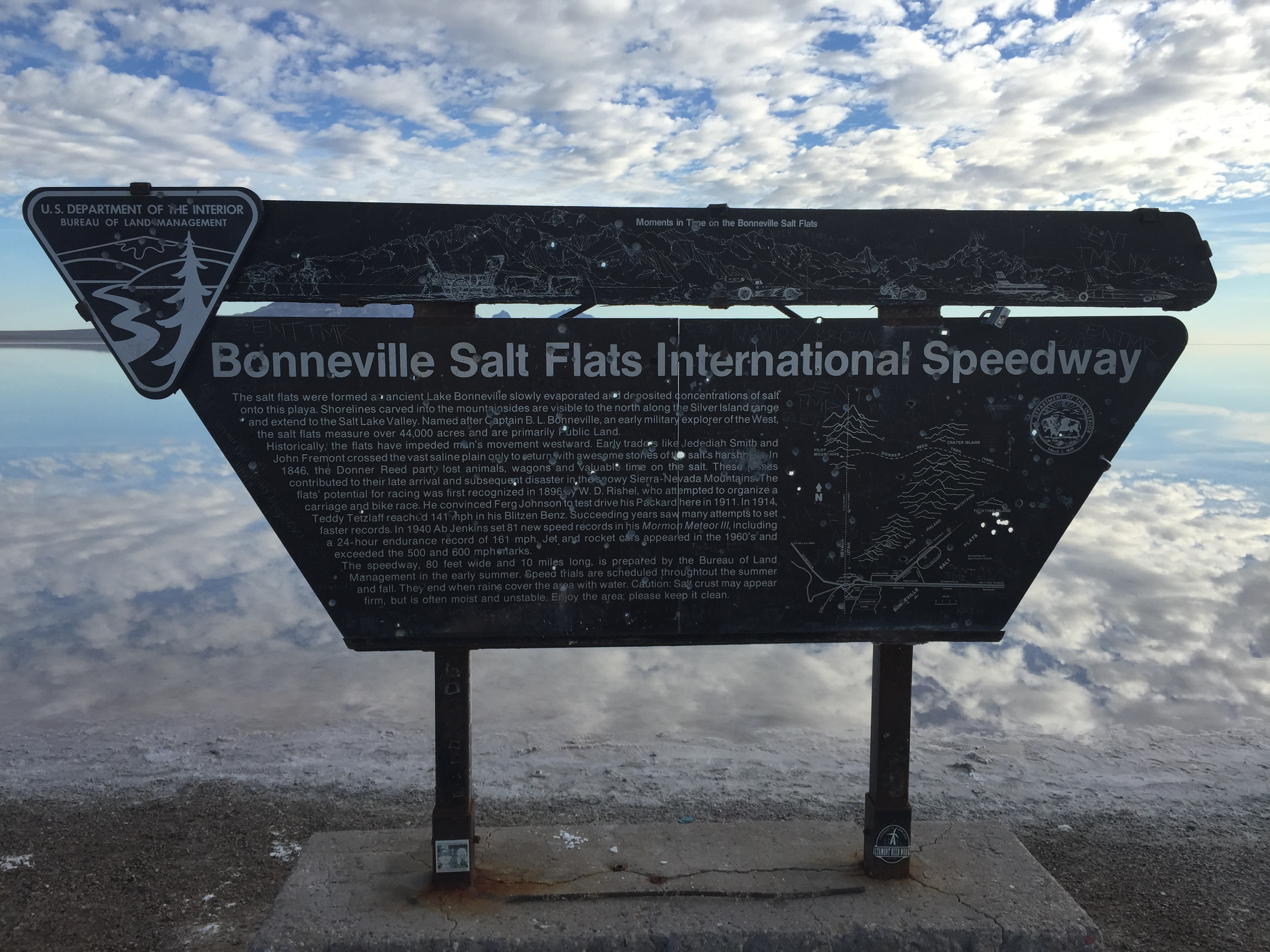
BLM interpretive sign at the Bonneville Salt Flats Rest Area on westbound Interstate 80, September 2015

The annual Speed Week was cancelled in both 2014 and 2015, as were many land-speed racing events, due to deteriorating track conditions. Heavy rains caused a layer of mud from surrounding mountains to flow onto the flats, covering approximately 6 mi (9.7 km) of the track. Although another section of the flats would normally be used, nearby salt mining operations had reduced the size of the alternative track.

The depth of the salt crust at Bonneville has also been decreasing, possibly leaching into a saltwater aquifer. Measured at as much at 3 ft (0.91 m) in the 1940s and 50s, it has been reduced to just 2 in (0.051 m) in 2015.

Though recent studies have been made (since 1960), the causes of this deterioration are not clear, although the evidence points toward both local climatic changes and salt mining. Some strategies were devised to revert the decreasing salt surface, such as pumping back salt, though this had no effect.

== Events and meetings ==
In August, the Southern California Timing Association and Bonneville Nationals Inc. organize Speed Week, the largest meet of the year, which attracts several hundred drivers who compete to set highest speed in a range of categories. Bonneville Speed Week has been taking place since 1949.

In late August, the Bonneville Motorcycle Speed Trials are held.

USFRA Test-n-Tune event in 2024

In September each year is the World of Speed, (similar to Speed Week) organized by the Utah Salt Flats Racing Association (USFRA). The USFRA also hosts a "Test-n-Tune" event in the summer prior to the World of Speed.

In October, the Southern California Timing Association puts on World Finals, a scaled-down version of Speed Week. This event tends to have cooler weather and often drier salt than Speed Week does. There are less spectators and it tends to draw serious racers, as this event is the last chance to break a land speed record and be in the SCTA record book for that year.

Each year, there are usually a few private meets that are not publicized scattered among the larger public meets.

== Land speed records ==
Numerous land speed records in various vehicle categories and classes have been set on the Bonneville speed way. In 1960, Mickey Thompson became the first American to break the 400 miles per hour (640 km/h) barrier, hitting 406.60 miles per hour (654.36 km/h) and surpassing John Cobb's 1947 one-way Land speed record of 403 miles per hour (649 km/h). Other notable examples of Bonneville speed records include:

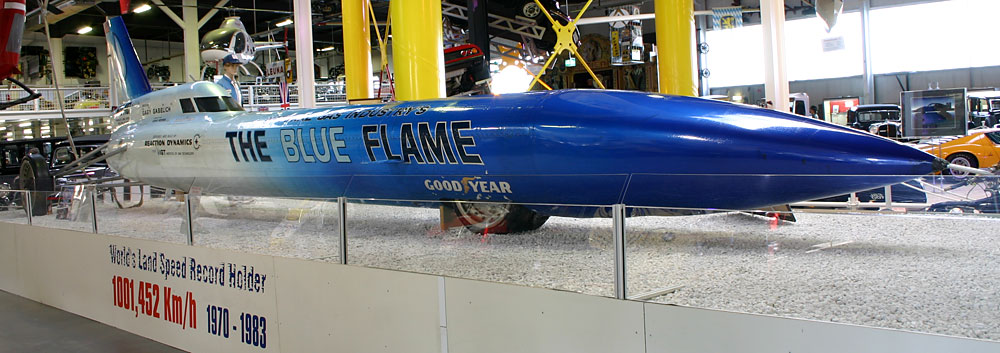
Gabelich's Blue Flame, December 2004

Dick Beith's Pepco Supercharged VW Lakester, August 1963

Year	Driver	Vehicle	Speed mph	Speed km/h	Class (category)	Notes
1935	Sir Malcolm Campbell	Blue Bird	301.129	484.620	[data needed]	
1947	Don Waite	The Edelbrock Special	192	309	[data needed]	
1954	George J Smith	Harley-Davidson knucklehead	152.02	244.652	[data needed]	Modified 91 ci knucklehead / alcohol
1963	Craig Breedlove	Spirit of America	407.447	655.722	[data needed]	
1963	Dick Beith	Pepco 36 hp VW Lakester	129.68	208.700	K36 Unlimited	Pepco supercharged 36 hp based engine in a "Lakester" style car fashioned from a WWII aircraft belly tank
1964	Art Arfons	The Green Monster	434.022	664.694	[data needed]	
1965	Craig Breedlove	Spirit of America — Sonic 1	600.601	966.574	[data needed]	
1967	Burt Munro	Indian Scout V-Twin	184.037	296.179	under 1,000 cc	
1970	Gary Gabelich	Blue Flame	622.407	1001.67	[data needed]	
1971	Warner Riley	Harley-Davidson Sportster	206.544	332.400	APS-AF 2000	S&S Modified 96 ci Sportster/nitromethane
1985	Dan Kinsey	Tenacious Streamliner	276.51	444.999	S-F 2000	S&S Modified 114 ci shovelhead/nitromethane
1991	Dan Kinsey	Tramp III Harley-Davidson	226.148	363.949	APS-AF 2000	S&S Modified 114 ci Evolution big twin/nitromethane
2001	Don Vesco	Vesco Turbinator — Turbine Engine	458.443	737.395	[data needed]	
2004	R. Schroer	Buckeye Bullet — Electric Vehicle	314.958	524.930	[data needed]	
2006	Andy Green	JCB Dieselmax — Diesel Streamliner	350.092	563.418	FIA A-III-13	World's Fastest Diesel
2006	Laura Klock	Harley-Davidson Road Glide	143.659	231.197	MPS-PF 3000	"World's Fastest Bagger"
2007	Erika Cobb	Buell Blast	107	172.2	MPS-PG 500	
2007	Laura Klock	Harley-Davidson Road Glide	146.297	235.442	MPS-PF 3000	"World's Fastest Bagger"
2008	Karlee Cobb	Buell Blast	109.867	176.814	MPS-PG 500	Youngest person in the world at the time the record was set to hold a land speed record
2009	Erika Cobb	Buell XB9 Firebolt	126.383	203.394	P-PP 1000	
2009	Karlee Cobb	Buell Blast	115	185.075	MPS-PG 500	
2009	Laura Klock	Victory Vision	122	196.34	MP-2000	
2009	Michelle Mielke	Yamaha Warrior	143.154	230.384	M-P-2000	
2009	Michelle Mielke	Yamaha Warrior	143.725	231.303	MPS-P 2000	
2010	Erika Cobb	Buell	136.476	219.637	P-PP 1000	
2010	Erika Cobb	Harley-Davidson Dyna with ProCharger	143.542	231.008	M-PBF 1650	
2010	Erika Cobb	Harley-Davidson Dyna with ProCharger	141	226.918	M-BF 1650	
2010	Karlee Cobb	Harley-Davidson Dyna with ProCharger	151.754	244.224	M-BG 1650	
2010	Chris Degen	Harley-Davidson	127.571	205.306	P-PP 1350	
2010	Charles Nearburg	Spirit of Rett	414.316	666.776	[data needed]	
2011	Erika Cobb	Harley-Davidson Dyna-Mite	143.542	231.008	M-P-BF 1650	
2011	Karlee Cobb	Harley-Davidson Dyna-Mite	151.754	244.224	M-BG 1650	
2012	Jeff Bailey	1994 Harley-Davison Buell S2	226.148	322.797	APS-AF 3000	S&S 160 ci Prostock engine/gasoline
2012	Brian Klock	Harley-Davidson Dyna-Mite	154	247.839	MP-BG 1650	
2012	Brandon Nozaki Miller	2012 Zero Motorcycles S ZF6 — Lightweight (under 150 kg) Unfaired Electric Motorcycle	102.281	164.605	First production electric motorcycle to break 100 mph	
2016	Roger Schroer	Venturi Buckeye Bullet 3	341.4	549.43	FIA A-VIII-8	Fastest electric vehicle
2016	Bob Sirna	Mercedes-Benz 300 SL	190.759	306.997	FIA A-VIII-8	3L Sport cars
2018	Shigeru Yamashita	Kawasaki Ninja H2	209.442	337.06	P-PB 1000	Fastest street-legal production motorcycle
2020	George Poteet	Speed Demon 715 streamliner	470.733	757.571	AA/BFS	557 CI twin-turbo Chevy

== Cycling records ==
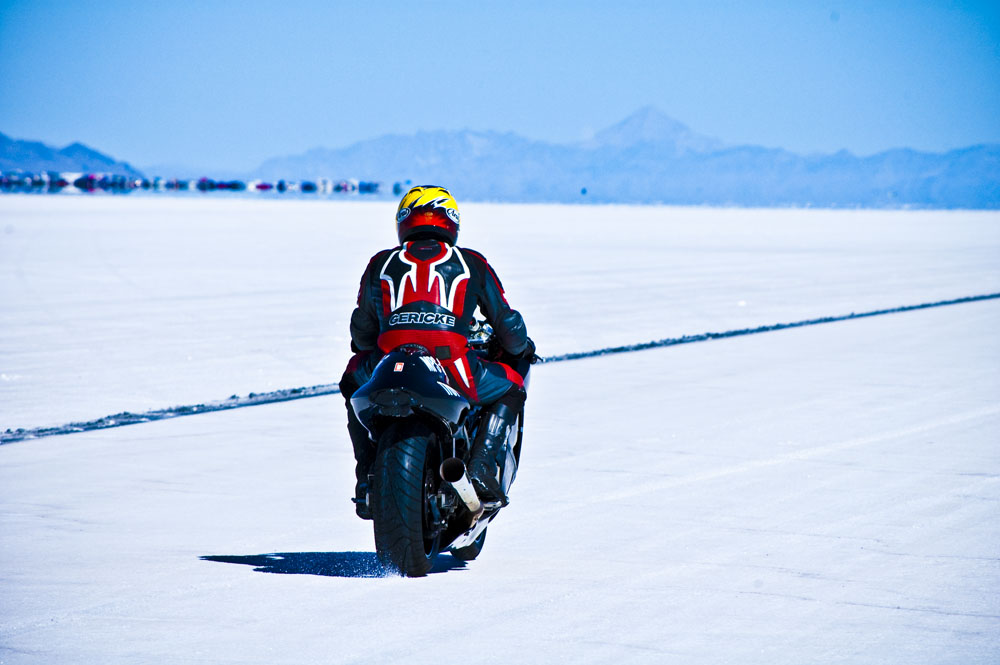
A Suzuki Hayabusa at Bonneville Speedway, September 2009

Several motor-paced racing speed records have been attempted at Bonneville.

In 1985, American cyclist John Howard set a then world record of 244 km/h (152 mph).

On 15 October 1995, Dutch cyclist Fred Rompelberg achieved 268.831 km/h (167.044 mph), using a special bicycle behind a dragster with a large shield.

In 2016, Denise Mueller-Korenek claimed a women's bicycle land speed record at 147 mph (237 km/h). She was coached by Howard. It is not clear which authority was supervising the record attempt.

In 2018, Mueller-Korenek broke her own women's record and the men's record at a speed of 183.9 miles per hour (296.0 km/h).

== In popular culture ==
- In the 2003 film The Brown Bunny, Bud Clay races his motorcycle at the speedway.
- In the 2005 film The World's Fastest Indian, Burt Munro and his highly modified Indian Scout motorcycle sets a world record.
- In the 2015 series finale episode of Mad Men, Donald Draper drives a 1970 Chevrolet Chevelle SS muscle car in the races at Bonneville Speedway.

== See also ==
- Bonneville Motorcycle Speed Trials (BMST)
- Black Rock Desert
- Land speed record
- List of vehicle speed records
- The World's Fastest Indian - a biographical sports drama film involving the Bonneville Salt Flats.
- National Register of Historic Places listings in Tooele County, Utah
