= Cayla Rivas =

American motorcycle racer

Cayla (Rivas) Kaolelopono
- Citizenship: US
- Occupation: Photojournalist
- Known for: Motorbike racing
- Father: Chris Rivas

Cayla Rivas's FIM record mentioned in the 114th U.S. Library of Congress

Cayla (Rivas) Kaolelopono is an American motorcycle racer based in Fresno, California, who set the FIM World Record by reaching a speed of 252.901 km/h, riding a modified Royal Enfield 650cc Twin, in 2018 Bonneville Motorcycle Speed Trials (BMST), held at Bonneville Speedway. While setting the record on 29 August 2018, she was 18 years old. Cayla was backed up by team Royal Enfield and S&S Racing.

So far, Cayla is holding 26 world-records in motorcycle racing.

== Personal life ==
Cayla Rivas is the daughter of Chris Rivas, a four-time NHRA Pro Stock Motorcycle drag racing champion, who is her mentor in motorcycle racing. Cayla Rivas studied photojournalism.
