= Ralph A. Hudson =

American motorcycle racer and record holder

Ralph Hudson
- Born: Ralph Allen Hudson; 19 May 1951; Temple City, California, U.S.
- Died: 6 September 2020 (aged 69); Salt Lake City, Utah, U.S.
- Occupations: Business owner Builder/Fabricator; Motorcycle mechanic
- Known for: Motorcycle Land Speed record holder
- Children: 1

Ralph Hudson (May 19, 1951 - September 6, 2020) was an American businessman and motorcycle racer who gained recognition for setting multiple AMA and FIM land-speed records at Bonneville between 2009 and 2020.

Over his career, Hudson set 39 records at Bonneville and El Mirage and won three SCTA motorcycle points championships. In recognition of his achievements, he was inducted into the Dry Lakes Racing Hall of Fame in 2017 and was later nominated for the Motorsports Hall of Fame of America of America.

== Racing career ==
Hudson first participated in Speed Week at the Bonneville Salt Flats in 1971 at the age of 20, racing a stock Kawasaki motorcycle.

After stepping away from racing for decades to focus on his career and family, Hudson returned to land speed racing at the age of 58 in 2009 with the purchase of a stock 2003 Suzuki GSX-R1000 on Craigslist, which he spent the next decade personally customizing.

Inspired by an idea he had conceived 30 years earlier, Hudson studied aerodynamics to develop a custom fiberglass bodywork for his motorcycle, which he fabricated in his Glendale, CA shop. The success of the design resulted in his first land-speed record, set at Bonneville in 2009 with an average speed of 210.623mph making him a member of the Bonneville 200 mph club.

Over the next decade, Hudson continued to refine the bodywork and mechanical features of his motorcycles and would go on to set numerous land speed records, many of which still stand.

== Top 1 Oil Bolivia Speed Trials ==
In 2018, Hudson participated in the Top 1 Oil Bolivia Speed Trials at the Uyuni Salt Flats with a goal of being the first traditional motorcycle to achieve an FIM record above 300mph.

Riding his Suzuki GSX-R1000, Hudson made a one-way run of 304 mph (489 km/h), the fastest recorded speed for a sit-on motorcycle, and set a land-speed record with an average speed of 297.970 mph, which remains the FIM world record as the top speed for a sit-on motorcycle.

== Death ==
On August 14, 2020, at the age of 69, Hudson crashed during his return run on a record attempt at Bonneville after a strong gust of wind blew him off course while traveling at a speed above 250mph. The accident resulted in Hudson's passing 23 days later on September 6.

== Land Speed Records ==
Bonneville Land Speed Records

Year	Manufacturer/Engine	Class	Official Speed	Notes
2009		APS-G 1000	210.622 mph	
2010		APS-G 1000	220.874 mph	
2011		APS-G 1000	225.596 mph	
2012		APS-G 1000	239.976 mph	Bonneville Speed Week
2016	Suzuki 1000cc	APS-BG 1000	230.719 mph	Bonneville Speed Week
2018	Suzuki 650cc	APS-BF 650	223.641 mph	Bonneville Speed Week
2019	Suzuki 650cc	APS-BG 1000	232.964 mph	Bonneville Motorcycle Speed Trials
2020	Suzuki 650cc	APS-BF 650	235.518 mph	Bonneville Speed Week
2020	Suzuki 650cc	APS-BG 650	241.273 mph	Bonneville Speed Week
2020	Suzuki 1000cc	APS-BF 1000	260.840 mph	Bonneville Speed Week
2020	Suzuki 1000cc	APS-BG 1000	263.678 mph	Bonneville Speed Week

El Mirage Land Speed Records

Year	Class	Official Speed	Notes
2009	APS-G 1000	194.882 mph	
2010	APS-G 1000	203.744 mph	
2011	APS-G 1000	214.360 mph	SCTA Motorcycle Champion
2013	APS-BF 1000	235.848 mph	SCTA Motorcycle Champion
2014	APS-BF 1000	241.126 mph	SCTA Motorcycle Champion
2015	APS-BF 1000	237.517 mph	
2016	APS-BF 1000	266.399 mph	SCTA Motorcycle Top Speed

TOP 1 Oil Bolivia Speed Trials

Year	Manufacturer/Model	Class	Official Speed	Notes
2017	Suzuki GSXR-1000	I.A1.B II.3+ 1000cc	284.361 mph	
2018	Suzuki GSXR-1000	I.A1.B II.3+ 1000cc	297.970 mph	
