= Bill Summers (car builder) =

American car builder

William Ray Summers (December 18, 1935 – May 12, 2011) was an American car builder. He and his brother Bob designed and built the Goldenrod, a streamliner car which held the wheel-driven land speed record from 1965 to 1991.
