= Larry Coleman =

Larry Coleman may refer to

- Larry Coleman (composer)
- Larry Coleman (motorcyclist)
