= Bonneville Motorcycle Speed Trials =

Bonneville Motorcycle Speed Trials, AMA Land Speed Grand Championship / FIM Land Speed World Records
- Venue: Bonneville Speedway, U.S.
- Location: Tooele County in North-Western Utah
- Corporate sponsor: Moto Nomaddicts, Omnivore Ventures, Grips for Life, Skagit Powersports, Women Rider's Now, HunterSills Racing, John Caraway, Fez Monkey's Salt Racing, Z Man Machining, Morto (Neil & Gina Olson), Sodium Distortion, Big Bad Nitro Daddy, Killerfish Engineering, Buell Bros and Sisters.
- Distance: Timed Mile and Timed Kilometer
- Previous names: BUB Motorcycle Speed Trials

Circuit information
- Surface: Salt

Bonneville Motorcycle Speed Trials (BMST) (AMA Land Speed Grand Championship / FIM Land Speed World Records) is a motorcycle land speed racing event, held annually at Bonneville Speedway, US. The event is sanctioned by American Motorcyclist Association (AMA) as the Land Speed Grand Championship and Fédération Internationale de Motocyclisme (FIM) as the FIM Land Speed World Records. AMA-certified US National Land Speed records, and FIM-certified Land Speed World Records are set at this event. The event features motorcycles ranging from 50-cc to 3000-cc, as well as electric classes.

The event has been held annually since 2004 after Speed Week at the end of August prior to Labor Day.

== History ==
=== 2024 ===
The 2024 Bonneville Motorcycle Speed Trials, also known as the AMA Land Speed Grand Championship and FIM Land Speed World Records event, are scheduled from August 24 to August 29 at the Bonneville Salt Flats, Utah. This annual event attracts motorcyclists aiming to set national and world speed records, featuring various classes, including electric motorcycles. It is sanctioned by both the American Motorcyclist Association and the Fédération Internationale de Motocyclisme.

=== 2023 ===
FIM Land Speed World Record Bonneville Motorcycle Speed Trials (BMST) set for 2023 Return FIM Land Speed World Records to once again welcome racers to Utah's famous Bonneville Salt Flats

=== 2022 ===
Cancelled due to flooding.

=== 2021 ===
17 new FIM world records and 55 AMA national records were set during the annual event 2021 BMST August 28-September 2. Notable entries include Jaron Tyner and Casper Wyoming's Tyrell Marlow who set new records on a Susuki Tl1000 and a Ducati 999 sidecar, the "Coconut Express" and Zlock racing who set three new FIM world records. SheEMoto award was presented to Sherry Soliz who also earned an AMA National record after breaking the ton (100MPH) on her father's BMW.

=== 2020 ===
The event was cancelled due to COVID 19 pandemic risks and restrictions.

=== 2019 ===
50 AMA national records and 10 FIM world records(pending ratification) were set during the annual event August 24-29th 2019. Team Mobitec became the first traditional sit-on electric powered motorcycle to break 200 mph (320 km/h).

=== 2018 ===
In 2018, the annual event was held from 25 to 30 August. 18-year-old Cayla Rivas became the youngest female racer to reach a speed of 252.901 km/h.

=== 2017 ===
78-year-old Sandy Vetter, reached a speed of 100 mph (160 km/h), riding a Yamaha 350cc two-stroke motorbike.

=== 2016 ===
The annual event was held from 26 to 31 August. Valerie Thompson became the first female driver riding a motorcycle over 300 mph (480 km/h), reaching a speed of 489.663 km/h.

=== 2015 ===
The event was cancelled in 2015, due to rain and resulting salt flat conditions.

== 2021 record results ==
=== 2021 BMST FIM Land Speed World Records results ===
FIM World Records Set During "BMST FIM Land Speed World Records" 2021
Last name	First name	Rider #	Category	Group	Division	Type	Displacement	Cylinders	Cycle	Fuel System	Make	Model	Year	Mile (mph)	Mile (km/h)	Kilo (mph)	Kilo (km/h)
Marlow	Tyrell	2222	I	A1	A	I	1000	Twin	4	Fuel injection	Suzuki	TL1000	2002	157.728	253.838	158.1	254.437
Cole	Jim	170	I	A1	A	II	1600	Multi	4	Fuel injection	Suzuki	Hayabusa	2002	212.183	341.476	212.605	342.155
Allen	Jay	2469	I	A1	A	II	2000	Twin	4	Fuel injection	Harley Davidson	Dyna	2006	197.552	317.93	197.891	318.475
Zlock	Dale	232	I	A1	B	I	600	Twin	4	Carburetor	Suzuki	SV	2004	128.345	206.552	128.419	206.671
Zlock	Dale	282	I	A1	B	I	750	Twin	4	Carburetor	Suzuki	SV	2004	158.949	255.804	N/A	N/A
Koiso	Hirohisa	9215	I	A1	B	II	2500	Twin	4	Fuel injection	Harley Davidson	FXD	2006	248.754	400.331	249.443	401.44
Tyner	Jaron	234	I	B1	A	II	1000	Twin	4	Fuel injection	Ducati	999	2003	103.456	166.496	103.739	166.951
Marlow	Tyrell	2341	I	B1	B	II	1000	Twin	4	Fuel injection	Ducati	999s	2003	89.546	144.11	89.605	144.206
Bohnhorst	Ralph	1777	II	B2	C	V	1350	Multi	4	Fuel injection	SSC 1	Aurelija	2018	201.715	324.629	201.944	324.998

=== 2021 AMA Land Speed Grand Championship results ===
AMA National Records Set During BMST 2021
Disp	Frame	Engine	Speed	Name	Make	Year
50	M	BF	34.784	Conway B.	Puch	2021
100	M	CG	69.853	Phillips P.	Bultaco	2021
100	MPS	PF	71.275	Siegl I.	Honda	2021
125	M	BF	80.209	Walhood K.	Yamaha	2021
125	MPS	BG	88.585	Allen R.	Yamaha	2021
125	P	PG	41.681	Conway B.	Ducati	2021
150	A	W	140.948	McDermott S.	Speed Hertz	2021
150	APS	W	166.73	McDermott S.	Speed Hertz	2021
175	M	BF	78.777	Fuhriman D.	Yamaha	2021
175	MPS	BF	86.39	Markstaller M.	Yamaha	2021
175	MPS	BG	84.173	Markstaller M.	Yamaha	2021
250	M	PF	55.566	Haynes C.	Aermacchi HD	2021
250	P	PC	74.349	Cole M.	Kawasaki	2021
250	P	PG	75.499	Beshlian K.	BMW	2021
250	P	PP	75.196	Beshlian K.	BMW	2021
250	SC	AF	81.144	Ramirez M.	Kawasaki	2021
250	SC	AG	72.053	Ramirez S.	Kawasaki	2021
350	A	VF	64.775	Harto D.	Cushman	2021
350	MPS	CG	107.449	Otis N.	Yamaha	2021
350	P	CG	97.301	Leischner B.	Kawasaki	2021
350	P	PP	70.789	Haynes C.	Aermacchi HD	2021
500	APS	BF	103.543	Cooke L.	Yamaha	2021
500	APS	BG	121.756	Cooke L.	Yamaha	2021
500	APS	CF	142.665	Woods B.	Yamaha	2021
500	M	CG	128.345	Mendez A.	Yamaha	2021
500	P	AF	110.337	Fowler M.	Kawasaki	2021
500	P	AG	109.431	Johnson P.	Kawasaki	2021
650	A	AG	152.338	Axelson K.	Honda	2021
650	APS	AF	169.55	Cipolla L.	Kawasaki	2021
650	APS	AG	156.772	Cipolla L.	Kawasaki	2021
650	P	CG	100.199	Soliz S.	BMW	2021
650	P	PC	104.405	Bancroft E.	Suzuki	2021
750	A	CF	121.428	McAleer J.	Kawasaki	2021
750	SC	P	64.686	Bryan B.	Ural	2021
1000	APS	AG	203.794	Zlock D.	Kawasaki	2021
1000	APS	BF	207.238	Lamb A.	Honda	2021
1000	MPS	AG	213.205	Richter T.	BMW	2021
1000	MPS	CF	130.629	Mitruk M.	Honda	2021
1000	MPS	PF	151.311	Kaoplelopono K.	Harley Davidson	2021
1000	SC	BF	104.423	Tyner J.	Ducati	2021
1000	SC	BG	89.904	Marlow T.	Ducati	2021
1350	A	CF	150.359	Haughton B.	Honda	2021
1350	A	CG	149.875	Haughton B.	Honda	2021
1350	APS	BG	203.472	LaMarche J.	Suzuki	2021
1350	M	PF	170.45	Rocho B.	Harley Davidson	2021
1350	P	PG	139.634	Woodford A.	Buell	2021
1350	P	VF	93.427	Clift B.	Indian	2021
1350	SC	PG	138.599	Reister K.	Harley Davidson	2021
1350	SCS	BF	201.84	Bohnhorst R.	SCC1	2021
1650	M	PBF	181.881	Klock B.	Harley-Davidson	2021
1650	M	PBG	173.743	Klock B.	Harley-Davidson	2021
2000	A	PBG	197.554	Allen J.	Harley Davidson	2021
2000	M	AG	185.23	Garcia M.	Suzuki	2021
2000	MPS	AG	187.509	Garcia M.	Suzuki	2021
3000	APS	PBG	248.783	Koiso H.	Harley Davidson	2021

== 2019 record results ==
=== 2019 BMST FIM world records ===
Category	Group	Division	Type	Class	Cylinders	Rider name		Make	1 mile (mph)	1 mile (km/h)	1 kilometer (mph)	1 kilometer (km/h)
I	A1	A	I	750	Multi	Bertelsen	Corey	Suzuki	168.197	270.688	168.327	270.897
I	A1	A	I	1000	Multi	Richter	Trevis	BMW	195.646	314.863	196.173	315.71
I	A1	A	II	1600	Multi	Cole	Jim	Suzuki			206.041	331.591
I	A1	A	II	2000	Twin	Allen	Jay	Harley-Davidson	192.386	309.615	192.522	309.834
I	A1	B	VII	+300 kg	Electric	Tsuruta	Ryuji	Mobitec	204.484	329.085	204.629	329.319
I	A1	B	I	1000	Multi	Sills	Erin	BMW	236.879	381.22	237.275	381.857
I	A1	B	I	2000	Twin	Kusunoki	Hideki	Harley-Davidson	196.791	316.705	197.056	317.131
I	A1	B	II	50	Single	Chikakane	Takushi	Honda-Dacapo	63.237	101.771	63.185	101.686
I	A1	B	II	125	Single	Chikakane	Takushi	Honda-Dacapo	62.991	101.375	63.084	101.525
II	B2	C	V	1350	Multi	Bohnhorst	Ralph	SSC 1	178.868	287.86	179.045	288.145

=== 2019 BMST AMA national records ===
Disp	Frame	Engine	Speed	Name	Make
50	APS	BG	63.274	Chikakane T.	Honda-dacapo
50	P	PC	49.942	Cooke K.	Honda
100	M	CG	65.115	Phillips P.	Bultaco
100	P	AG	52.795	Conway B.	Bridgestone
125	APS	BG	64.3	Chikakane T.	Honda-dacapo
250	M	CF	70.409	Chapman D.	Honda
250	P	CG	75.465	Conway B.	Suzuki
250	P	P	119.842	Tyner J.	Honda
250	P	PC	73.249	Dunnigan M.	Benelli
350	M	CG	102.307	Vetter C.	Yamaha
350	M	PG	98.147	Betty P.	Triumph
350	MPS	PF	101.429	Genet N.	Moto Morini
350	P	AG	102.899	Kenneally S.	Yamaha
350	P	CF	98.26	Leischner B.	Kawasaki
350	P	PP	66.91	Gable G.	Harley-Davidson
500	A	BF	110.732	Cooke L.	Yamaha
500	P	PC	101.887	Buchanan R.	Honda
500	SC	CG	71.355	Kornasiewicz A.	Suzuki
650	A	VG	86.366	Bargholz R.	Indian
650	APS	PF	137.915	Kaolelopono C.	Buell
650	P	CG	97.162	Rogers S.	Kawasaki W2
650	P	PC	99.01	Rogers S.	Kawasaki W2
650	P	PP	105.86	Sprosen M.	Triumph
750	M	AF	168.201	Bertelsen C.	Suzuki
750	M	AG	165.841	Bertelsen C.	Suzuki
750	M	BF	182.292	McKechnie J.	Suzuki
750	M	CF	142.385	Duncan B.	Triumph
750	MPS	CF	148.323	Duncan B.	Triumph
750	MPS	CG	145.906	Gosling R.	Triumph
750	P	PG	99.814	Schill A.	Norton
1000	A	CBF	143.52	Haner R.	Harley-Davidson
1000	APS	BG	232.964	Hudson R.	Suzuki
1000	APS	CBF	156.852	Haner R.	Harley-Davidson
1000	M	AF	195.675	Richter T.	BMW
1000	M	BF	181.041	King D.	Kawasaki
1000	MPS	PF	146.521	Woodford D.	Harley-Davidson
1000	P	CF	103.83	Rogers J.	Harley-Davidson
1350	A	PBF	160.5	Rocho B.	Harley-Davidson
1350	APS	CF	152.83	Mills D.	Suzuki
1350	APS	CG	158.507	Mills D.	Suzuki
1350	M	CG	144.867	Albrecht ".	Harley-Davidson
1350	P	PG	136.282	Woodford A.	Buell
1350	SCS	BF	179.065	Bohnhorst R.	SSC 1
1650	APS	VF	134.058	Hector F.	Harley-Davidson
2000	A	PBG	192.386	Allen J.	Harley-Davidson
2000	APS	PF	196.795	Kusunoki H.	Harley-Davidson
3000	A	CF	115.089	Carpio F.	Suzuki
0	APS	W	204.525	Tsuruta R.	MOBITEC

== 2018 record results ==
=== 2018 BMST FIM world records ===
Group	Division	Type	Class	# Cylinders	Rider name		Make	1 mile (mph)	1 mile (km/h)	1 kilometer (mph)	1 kilometer (km/h)
A1	A	I	350cc	Twin	Stephen	Garn	Yamaha	117.031	188.344	117.417	188.965
A1	A	I	750cc	Twin	Cayla	Rivas	Royal Enfield	157.053	252.753	157.145	252.901
A1	A	II	2000cc	Twin	Jay	Allen	Harley-Davidson	191.654	308.437	191.779	308.638
A1	B	I	125cc	Single	Belen	Wagner	KTM	129.348	208.166	129.423	208.286
A1	B	I	750cc	Single	Kerry	O'Day	Kawasaki	127.142	204.616	127.19	204.693
A1	B	I	1000cc	Twin	Jean Nicolas	Genet	Suzuki	171.809	276.5	171.808	276.499
A1	B	II	1600cc	Multi	Belen	Wagner	Suzuski	217.171	349.503	217.393	349.86
A1	B	II	2000cc	Twin	Jay	Allen	Harley-Davidson	229.762	369.766	230.043	370.218
A1	B	II	2500cc	Twin	Hiro	Koiso	Harley-Davidson/JIMS	223.195	359.199	224.34	361.04
A3	A	I	50cc	Single	Pietro	Zanetti	GARELLI	18.613	29.955	18.74	30.159
B1	A	I	100cc	Single	Gilles	Pujol	GILLES PUJOL	28.384	45.68	28.327	45.588

=== 2018 BMST AMA national records ===
American Motorcyclist Association national land speed records
Disp	Frame	Engine	Speed MPH	Name	Make
50	M	PV	18.73	Zanetti P.	GARELLI
50	P	CG	50.641	Cooke K.	Honda
50	P	PP	51.061	Cooke K.	Honda
100	P	PC	50.719	Conway B.	Bridgestone
100	SC	VF	28.891	Pujol G.	GILLES PUJOL MOTORCYCLES
125	M	AF	119.42	Wagner B.	KTM
125	M	AG	119.387	Wagner B.	KTM
125	MPS	AF	129.385	Wagner B.	KTM
125	P	PC	74.353	Conway B.	Can-Am
175	A	BG	62.319	Klostermann T.	Honda
175	M	CF	76.628	Mellor-Laing D.	Honda
175	M	CG	79.205	Mellor-Laing D.	Honda
175	MPS	CG	80.407	Billig J.	Honda
250	M	CG	81.572	Swangstu E.	Yamaha
250	SC	CG	63.442	Walsworth D.	Suzuki
350	A	CG	138.617	McLachlan D.	Bones Built
350	M	CF	107.283	Vetter C.	Yamaha
350	M	CG	87.876	Schmalle D.	Honda
350	MPS	PF	97.087	Genet J.	Moto Morini
350	MPS	PG	102.165	Genet J.	Moto Morini
350	P	CG	93.491	Leischner B.	Kawasaki
500	A	BG	130.322	Cooke L.	Yamaha
500	A	VF	82.46	Gerean T.	AJS
500	M	CF	115.646	Patterson K.	Yamaha
500	P	CG	102.2	Richmond M.	Kawasaki
500	P	PC	100.669	Pearsall D.	Kawasaki
650	A	VF	94.018	Bargholz R.	Indian
650	M	CF	111.673	Soliz S.	Honda
650	M	CG	115.297	Soliz S.	Honda
650	M	VF	66.971	Becker M.	Triumph
650	MPS	BG	171.62	Skurdal A.	Suzuki
650	MPS	CF	110.05	Soliz S.	Honda
650	MPS	CG	114.693	Soliz S.	Honda
650	P	CG	95.795	Rogers S.	Kawasaki
650	P	PP	101.855	Rogers S.	Kawasaki
650	P	PV	87.418	Gillan G.	BSA
750	A	AG	168.083	Bertelsen C.	Suzuki
750	APS	AF	181.059	Zlock D.	Kawzuki
750	M	CBG	63.802	Chambers C.	Honda
750	M	CF	139.853	Weinhold D.	Honda
750	M	CG	136.62	Weinhold D.	Honda
750	MPS	CF	144.203	Weinhold D.	Honda
750	MPS	CG	143.006	Weinhold D.	Honda
750	P	PV	95.318	Clough S.	Indian
1000	A	PBF	137.245	Axelson K.	Buell
1000	A	VBF	129.118	Woods B.	Harley-Davidson
1000	APS	AG	198.342	Zlock D.	Kawasaki
1000	APS	PF	207.598	Mellor T.	Triumph
1000	M	CF	109.353	Hopkins T.	Honda
1000	MPS	PF	139.492	Woodford D.	Harley-Davidson
1350	A	AG	194.594	Mateu J.	Suzuki
1350	APS	BG	192.724	LaMarche J.	Suzuki
1350	M	CF	142.892	Mills D.	Sizuki
1350	MPS	CF	146.37	Mills D.	Suzuki
1350	P	PG	126.293	Johns B.	Harley-Davidson
1350	SC	AG	128.248	Ramirez S.	Suzuki
1350	SC	PG	136.67	Reister K.	Harley-Davidson
1650	A	PBF	168.248	Rocho B.	Harley-Davidson
1650	APS	VF	129.464	Hector F.	Harley-Davidson
1650	M	BF	215.984	Cole J.	Suzuki
1650	M	BG	214.547	Cole J.	Suzuki
1650	MPS	BF	232.972	Cole J.	Suzuki
1650	MPS	BG	226.264	Cole J.	Suzuki
1650	P	VF	100.727	Clift B.	Indian
2000	A	PBG	191.656	Allen J.	Harley-Davidson
2000	A	PG	177.376	Yurko M.	Harley Davidson
2000	APS	PBG	229.794	Allen J.	Harley-Davidson
2000	M	AG	180.498	Omer J.	Yamaha
3000	MPS	AF	174.914	Ragle J.	Triumph

== AMA national records (1958 – Sept 2021) ==
American Motorcyclist Association national land speed records 1958 – Sept 2021
Disp	Frame	Engine	Speed	Name	Make	Year
0	A	W	181.439	Yates W.	Swigz ProRacing	2011
0	APS	W	204.525	Tsuruta R.	MOBITEC	2019
0	SC	W	108.502	Clemens K.	Baker	2016
0	SCS	W	248.7	Hakansson E.	KillaJoule Electric	2016
50	A	AF	80.949	Packard D.	Suzuki	1973
50	A	AG	72.558	Packard D.	Suzuki	1969
50	APS	AF	98.284	Toersen A.	Green Tulip Kreidler	2014
50	APS	AG	102.703	Schneider M.	Honda	2011
50	APS	BG	63.274	Chikakane T.	HONDA-dacapo	2019
50	M	AF	74.752	Wagner B.	Cobra	2005
50	M	AG	70.314	Walsh T.	Honda	1974
50	M	BF	9.905	Porterfield L.	Honda	2011
50	M	BF	34.784	Conway B.	Puch	2021
50	M	PV	18.73	Zanetti P.	GARELLI	2018
50	MPS	AF	82.004	Wallingford J.	Aprilia	2013
50	MPS	AG	81.986	Ahrens J.	Kreidler	1977
50	P	AG	60.561	Alexander G.	Aprilia	2009
50	P	CG	50.641	Cooke K.	Honda	2018
50	P	P	60.649	Alexander G.	Aprilia	2009
50	P	PC	49.942	Cooke K.	Honda	2019
50	P	PP	51.061	Cooke K.	Honda	2018
50	S	AF	144.921	BuddenbaumJ.	Buddenbaum	2008
50	S	AG	121.439	Noyes E	Buddenbaum	2006
50	SCS	AF	80.427	McLeish D	Van Butler	2005
100	A	AF	91.666	Eckhardt D.	Suzuki	1973
100	A	AG	92.422	Conway T.	Kawasaki	1975
100	APS	AF	104.395	Bowns B.	Honda	1977
100	APS	AG	101.907	Schneider M.	Honda	2010
100	APS	BF	106.226	Afflick J.	Kitaco/Honda	2017
100	M	AF	96.618	York P.	Honda	1974
100	M	AG	93.137	Conway T.	Kawasaki	1973
100	M	CG	65.115	Phillips P.	Bultaco	2019
100	M	CG	69.853	Phillips P.	Bultaco	2021
100	M	P	66.157	Alter H.	Honda	2011
100	M	VG	42.337	Moore J.	James Comet	2011
100	MPS	AF	102.748	Bowns B.	Honda	1976
100	MPS	AG	93.186	Conway T.	Kawasaki	1974
100	MPS	PF	71.275	Siegl I.	Honda	2021
100	P	AF	48.765	Conway B.	Bridgestone	2014
100	P	AG	52.795	Conway B.	Bridgestone	2019
100	P	CG	55.245	Conway B.	Bridgestone	2017
100	P	P	66.749	Alter H.	Honda	2011
100	P	PC	50.719	Conway B.	Bridgestone	2018
100	P	PP	52.772	Williams R.	Honda	2009
100	S	AF	155.11	BuddenbaumJ.	Buddenbaum	2009
100	S	AG	142.864	Hunter E.	Swedetech/Costella	2008
100	SC	VF	28.891	Pujol G.	Gilles Pujol Motorcycles	2018
125	A	AF	124.828	Kolb S.	Honda	2008
125	A	AG	125.75	Kolb S.	Honda	2008
125	APS	AF	146.72	Kolb S.	Kolb	2010
125	APS	AG	149.907	Kolb S.	Kolb	2013
125	APS	BG	64.3	Chikakane T.	HONDA-dacapo	2019
125	M	AF	119.42	Wagner B.	KTM	2018
125	M	AG	119.387	Wagner B.	KTM	2018
125	M	BF	80.209	Walhood K.	Yamaha	2021
125	M	CG	79.412	Van Stee R.	Bultaco	2017
125	M	VF	46.613	Brown A.	BSA	2014
125	M	VG	45.737	Brown A.	BSA	2014
125	MPS	AF	129.385	Wagner B.	KTM	2018
125	MPS	AG	126.305	Zaloom D.	Honda	2007
125	MPS	BF	86.3	Woods BMF	Yamaha	2013
125	MPS	BG	88.585	Allen R.	Yamaha	2021
125	MPS	VF	46.802	Brown A.	BSA	2014
125	P	BF	85.915	Woods BMF	Yamaha	2013
125	P	BG	78.122	Woods BMF	Yamaha	2013
125	P	CG	71.839	Conway B.	Can-Am	2016
125	P	P	92.45	Woods BMF	Yamaha	2013
125	P	PC	74.353	Conway B.	Can-Am	2018
125	P	PG	41.681	Conway B.	Ducati	2021
125	P	PP	63.267	Taylor M.	Honda	2016
125	S	AF	186.649	Noyes E.	Buddenbaum	2009
125	S	AG	133.165	Grenestedt J.	Grenestedt	2009
150	A	W	114.488	Sullivan J.	Electric Conv.	2013
150	A	W	140.948	McDermott S.	Speed Hertz	2021
150	APS	W	113.079	Sullivan J.	Electric Conv.	2013
150	APS	W	166.73	McDermott S.	Speed Hertz	2021
150	M	W	93.338	Cameron W.	Alta	2017
150	MPS	W	103.53	Mateu J.	Alta	2017
150	SC	W	60.583	Carey G.	Kawasaki	2010
175	A	AF	106.315	Brigham IV H.	Can-Am	1976
175	A	AG	106.944	Brigham IV H.	Can-Am	1976
175	A	BG	62.319	Klostermann T.	Honda	2018
175	A	CG	56.067	Stice Jr G.	Kawasaki	2014
175	APS	AF	126.515	Wagner B.	Honda	2004
175	APS	AG	120.098	Wagner B.	Honda	2005
175	APS	BF	58.666	Manning C.	Honda	2012
175	M	AF	110.004	Wagner B.	Honda	2009
175	M	AG	106.023	Ebersole D.	Yamaha	1977
175	M	BF	78.777	Fuhriman D.	Yamaha	2021
175	M	BG	65.89	Pavlak R.	Honda	2010
175	M	CF	76.628	Mellor-Laing D.	Honda	2018
175	M	CG	79.205	Mellor-Laing D.	Honda	2018
175	M	VG	73.083	Wathne J.	Moto Parilla	2013
175	MPS	AF	104.564	Kushdilian P.	Bridge	1971
175	MPS	AG	113.032	Wagner B.	Honda	2005
175	MPS	BF	86.39	Markstaller M.	Yamaha	2021
175	MPS	BG	84.173	Markstaller M.	Yamaha	2021
175	MPS	CG	80.407	Billig J.	Honda	2018
175	MPS	P	76.454	Wurdeman M.	Kawasaki	2011
175	MPS	UG	97.479	Kastan I.	Honda	2009
175	MPS	VG	71.732	Wathne J.	Moto Parilla	2013
175	P	AF	73.941	Wurdeman M.	Kawasaki	2014
175	P	AG	64.79	Billig J.	Genuine	2014
175	P	CG	66.061	Cole M.	Kawasaki	2016
175	P	P	77.878	Wurdeman M.	Kawasaki	2011
175	P	PP	55.541	Conway W.	Mondial	2009
250	A	AF	141.698	Wagner B.	Honda	2008
250	A	AG	139.949	Bertelsen C.	Honda	2013
250	A	CG	94.525	Smith C.	Bultaco	2016
250	APS	AF	145.816	Bertelsen C.	Honda	2013
250	APS	AG	152.175	Wagner B.	Honda	2006
250	APS	PF	79.144	Bennett. M.	Triumph	2010
250	APS	PG	93.825	Riggs D.	Harley-Davidson	2009
250	M	AF	141.677	Wagner B.	Honda	2007
250	M	AG	139.369	Wagner B.	Honda	2006
250	M	CF	70.409	Chapman D.	Honda	2019
250	M	CG	81.572	Swangstu E.	Yamaha	2018
250	M	P	101.633	Simmermon T.	Kawasaki	2011
250	M	PF	55.566	Haynes C.	Aermacchi HD	2021
250	M	PG	82.541	Weinhold D.	Triumph	2011
250	M	VF	75.504	May D.	BMW	2012
250	MPS	AF	163.618	Edwards A.	Aprilia	2006
250	MPS	AG	144.387	Vickery S.	Yamaha	1978
250	MPS	P	106.949	Smith G.	Kawasaki	2010
250	MPS	PF	68.442	Rivas C.	Buell	2013
250	MPS	PG	88.748	Weinhold D.	Triumph	2013
250	MPS	VF	79.728	Chawla C.	BMW	2012
250	P	CG	75.465	Conway B.	Suzuki	2019
250	P	P	119.842	Tyner J.	Honda	2019
250	P	PC	73.249	Dunnigan M.	Benelli	2019
250	P	PC	74.349	Cole M.	Kawasaki	2021
250	P	PG	75.499	Beshlian K.	BMW	2021
250	P	PP	75.196	Beshlian K.	BMW	2021
250	P	PV	77.963	Berneck R	BMW	2012
250	S	AF	189.529	Vesco D.	Yamaha	1973
250	S	AG	172.455	Vesco D.	Yamaha	1972
250	SC	AF	81.144	Ramirez M.	Kawasaki	2021
250	SC	AG	72.053	Ramirez S.	Kawasaki	2021
250	SC	CG	63.442	Walsworth D.	Suzuki	2018
250	SCS	F	145.226	McLeish D.	Honda	2004
300	A	W	173.574	Yates W.	Swigz ProRacing	2011
300	APS	W	203.361	Hoogerhyde	Lightning	2013
300	M	W	20.256	DeSimone H.		2005
300	SC	W	54.651	Clemens K.	Baker	2016
350	A	AF	139.593	Eriksen B.	Yamaha	1975
350	A	AG	141.928	Eckhardt D.	Yamaha	1974
350	A	BF	96.32	Omer J.	Honda	2007
350	A	BG	107.533	Omer J.	Honda	2009
350	A	CF	121.246	Garn S.	Yamaha	2017
350	A	CG	138.617	McLachlan D.	Bones Built	2018
350	A	PF	96.898	Berneck R.	Moto Morini	2013
350	A	PG	97.452	Berneck R.	Moto Morini	2013
350	A	VF	49.319	Harto D.	Cushman	2016
350	A	VF	64.775	Harto D.	Cushman	2021
350	A	VG	69.258	Bargholz R.	Matchless	2017
350	APS	AF	151.901	Eriksen B.	Yamaha	1975
350	APS	AG	170.519	Henise J.	Highwayman	2017
350	APS	CF	120.609	Garn S.	Yamaha	2017
350	APS	CG	163.292	Glaister C.	Highwayman	2017
350	APS	PF	96.86	Berneck R.	Moto Morini	2013
350	APS	PG	98.319	Wathne J.	Moto Morini	2013
350	M	AF	136.171	Jensen C.R.	Yamaha	1978
350	M	AG	138.995	Jensen C.R.	Yamaha	1978
350	M	CF	107.283	Vetter C.	Yamaha	2018
350	M	CG	102.307	Vetter C.	Yamaha	2019
350	M	P	82.519	Cripps S.	Honda	2011
350	M	PF	97.961	Wathne J.	Morini	2012
350	M	PG	98.147	Betty P.	Triumph	2019
350	MPS	AF	156.661	Edwards A.	Yamaha	2006
350	MPS	AG	148.727	Eriksen B.	Yamaha	1976
350	MPS	BF	129.394	Gagne G.	Yamaha	2013
350	MPS	CF	102.696	Vetter C.	Yamaha	2017
350	MPS	CG	98.607	Smith G.	Kawasaki	2014
350	MPS	CG	107.449	Otis N.	Yamaha	2021
350	MPS	PBG	124.114	Noonan M.	Moto Guzzi	2017
350	MPS	PF	101.429	Genet N.	Moto Morini	2019
350	MPS	PG	102.165	Genet J.	Moto Morini	2018
350	P	AF	96.469	Vetter S.	Yamaha	2016
350	P	AG	102.899	Kenneally S.	Yamaha	2019
350	P	CF	98.26	Leischner B.	Kawasaki	2019
350	P	CG	93.491	Leischner B.	Kawasaki	2018
350	P	CG	97.301	Leischner B.	Kawasaki	2021
350	P	P	129.579	Kenneally S.	Yamaha	2013
350	P	PC	80.102	Ilminen G.	Honda	2014
350	P	PP	66.91	Gable G.	Harley-Davidson	2019
350	P	PP	70.789	Haynes C.	Aermacchi HD	2021
350	S	AF	202.445	Vesco D.	Yamaha	1973
350	S	AG	189.622	Gullet C.	Costella	2007
350	SC	AF	91.752	Bertelsen C.	Yamaha	2016
350	SC	AG	116.097	Frazeur D.	Yamaha	2008
500	A	AF	142.602	GansbergerT.	Honda	1978
500	A	AG	137.532	Isley R.	Kawasaki	1971
500	A	BF	110.732	Cooke L.	Yamaha	2019
500	A	BG	130.322	Cooke L.	Yamaha	2018
500	A	CG	119.89	Matthews W.	Yamaha	2014
500	A	PF	111.378	Scroggins R.	Westlake	2008
500	A	PG	125.364	Borcherdt T.	BSA	2013
500	A	VF	82.46	Gerean T.	AJS	2018
500	A	VG	108.931	Baublitz J.	BMW	2009
500	APS	AF	157.154	Woods W.	Honda	2011
500	APS	AG	157.236	Eriksen B.H.	Yamaha	1978
500	APS	BF	103.543	Cooke L.	Yamaha	2021
500	APS	BG	121.756	Cooke L.	Yamaha	2021
500	APS	CF	55.847	Bodine L.	Honda	2016
500	APS	CF	142.665	Woods B.	Yamaha	2021
500	APS	CG	134.351	Groves A.	Yamaha	2014
500	APS	PBF	128.181	Richmond M.	Honda	2009
500	APS	PF	134.651	Rivas C.	Buell	2016
500	APS	PG	143.329	Borcherdt T.	BSA	2013
500	APS	VF	106.266	Szoldrak J.	Royal Enfield	2013
500	APS	VG	106.83	Kerkoff L.	BMW	2009
500	M	AF	145.22	Eriksen B.H.	Yamaha	1978
500	M	AG	140.723	Atkinson M.	Yamaha	2013
500	M	BG	88.937	Damm A.	Kawasaki	2012
500	M	CF	115.646	Patterson K.	Yamaha	2018
500	M	CG	113.274	Groves A.	Yamaha	2016
500	M	CG	128.345	Mendez A.	Yamaha	2021
500	M	P	123.411	Wolbrink M.	Kawasaki	2008
500	M	PF	104.052	Hulstrand M.	Honda	2013
500	M	PG	119.151	Bilton-Smith P.	Norton	2016
500	M	VF	86.842	Jessup G.	Triumph	2007
500	M	VG	109.622	Szoldrak J.	Royal Enfeild	2008
500	MPS	AF	156.376	Eriksen B.H.	Yamaha	1978
500	MPS	AG	167.971	Vesco D.	Yamaha	1975
500	MPS	BG	100.099	Woods W.	Honda	2016
500	MPS	CF	116.657	Groves A.	Yamaha	2016
500	MPS	CG	120.183	Groves A.	Yamaha	2016
500	MPS	P	131.431	Kilkenny K.	Kawasaki	2008
500	MPS	PBF	129.749	BartholomewT.	Honda	2009
500	MPS	PBG	134.722	Rivas C.	Buell	2016
500	MPS	PF	118.992	Rivas C.	Buell	2014
500	MPS	PG	123.283	Bilton-Smith P.	Norton	2016
500	MPS	VF	92.417	Jessup J.	Triumph	2009
500	P	AF	92.427	Gatewood C.	Harley-Davidson	2014
500	P	AF	110.337	Fowler M.	Kawasaki	2021
500	P	AG	109.431	Johnson P.	Kawasaki	2021
500	P	CG	102.2	Richmond M.	Kawasaki	2018
500	P	P	125.031	Smith G.	Kawasaki	2012
500	P	PB	122.644	Kott J.	Honda	2005
500	P	PBG	126.747	Claridge M.	Honda	2007
500	P	PC	101.887	Buchanan R.	Honda	2019
500	P	PF	100.096	Hulstrand M.	Honda	2013
500	P	PP	101.046	Hulstrand M.	Honda	2011
500	P	PV	103.785	Meadows T.	BSA	2010
500	P	UG	87.229	Cole M.	Suzuki	2009
500	S	AF	212.288	Thomas J.	Triumph	1958
500	S	AG	234.989	Gullet C.	Costella	2008
500	SC	AF	102.702	Bertelsen C.	Yamaha	2016
500	SC	AG	101.289	Bertelsen C.	Yamaha	2016
500	SC	CG	71.355	Kornasiewicz A.	Suzuki	2019
650	A	AF	159.542	Richards G.	Triumph	1961
650	A	AG	149.117	Rispoli J.	Kawasaki	2009
650	A	AG	152.338	Axelson K.	Honda	2021
650	A	BF	176.549	Lessard P.	G-Force	2014
650	A	BG	102.042	Woods W.	Yamaha	2007
650	A	PF	156.168	Sungurtekin A.	Alp R&D Triumph	2016
650	A	PG	133.464	Alp S.	Triumph Custom Pre-Unit LSR	2014
650	A	VBF	97.987	Nielsen L.	Indian	2011
650	A	VF	94.018	Bargholz R.	Indian	2018
650	A	VG	86.366	Bargholz R.	Indian	2019
650	APS	AF	161.793	Richards G.	Triumph	1965
650	APS	AF	169.55	Cipolla L.	Kawasaki	2021
650	APS	AG	152.474	Goveia E.	Kawasaki	1977
650	APS	AG	156.772	Cipolla L.	Kawasaki	2021
650	APS	BF	204.743	Lessard P.	G Force	2016
650	APS	BG	162.47	Cole T.	Triumph	2008
650	APS	PF	137.915	Kaolelopono C.	Buell	2019
650	APS	PG	149.891	Borcherdt T.	BSA	2014
650	M	AF	175.144	Pfeiler L.	Kawasaki	2011
650	M	AG	158.414	Williams D.	Kawasaki	2013
650	M	BF	180.083	Watters G.	Suzuki	2016
650	M	BG	173.038	Sutton T.	Yamaha	2008
650	M	CF	111.673	Soliz S.	Honda	2018
650	M	CG	115.297	Soliz S.	Honda	2018
650	M	P	151.389	Markham K.	Honda	2011
650	M	PBF	125.703	Pauletto D.	Triumph	2013
650	M	PF	125.883	Parsley T.	Harley-Davidson	2009
650	M	PG	120.293	Kedinger K.	Harley-Davidson	2004
650	M	PP	98.374	Anderson S.	Triumph	2008
650	M	VF	66.971	Becker M.	Triumph	2018
650	M	VG	127.092	Sungurtekin A.	Trimph	2013
650	MPS	AF	178.345	Pfeiler L.	Kawasaki	2017
650	MPS	AG	172.365	Petrun M.	Kawasaki	2006
650	MPS	BF	191.989	Schaller D.	Honda	2007
650	MPS	BG	171.62	Skurdal A.	Suzuki	2018
650	MPS	CF	110.05	Soliz S.	Honda	2018
650	MPS	CG	114.693	Soliz S.	Honda	2018
650	MPS	P	159.648	Alter K.	Yamaha	2009
650	MPS	PF	130.188	Parsley T.	Buell	2006
650	MPS	PG	133.828	Parsley T.	Buell	2009
650	MPS	VG	99.475	Becker M.	Triumph	2010
650	P	AF	173.577	Pfeiler L.	Kawasaki	2010
650	P	CG	97.162	Rogers S.	Kawasaki W2	2019
650	P	CG	100.199	Soliz S.	BMW	2021
650	P	P	168.532	Pfeiler L.	Kawasaki	2009
650	P	PC	99.01	Rogers S.	Kawasaki W2	2019
650	P	PC	104.405	Bancroft E.	Suzuki	2021
650	P	PG	99.029	Rogers S.	Kawasaki	2017
650	P	PP	105.86	Sprosen M.	Triumph	2019
650	P	PV	87.418	Gillan G.	BSA	2018
650	S	AF	230.269	Johnson B.	Triumph	1962
650	SC	AF	121.984	Skjorshammer H.	Pritchard	2011
650	SC	AG	116.055	Skjorshammer H.	Pritchard	2011
750	A	AF	169.426	Moore N.	Ducati W3	2017
750	A	AG	168.083	Bertelsen C.	Suzuki	2018
750	A	BF	189.097	Higgins J.	Suzuki	2010
750	A	CF	121.428	McAleer J.	Kawasaki	2021
750	A	D	90.251	Hayes F.	HDTUSA	2009
750	A	DB	114.152	Hayes F.	Hayes	2012
750	A	PBF	124.482	Daly C.	Buell	2013
750	A	PBG	127.795	Daly J.	Buell	2011
750	A	PF	154.236	Duncan B.	Triumph	2013
750	A	PG	143.149	Gosling R.	Triumph	2013
750	A	VF	99.78	Cole H.	Brough Superior	2013
750	A	VG	101.132	Cathcart A.	Brough Superior	2013
750	APS	AF	181.059	Zlock D.	Kawzuki	2018
750	APS	AG	172.221	Zlock D.	Kawzuki (Kawasaki frame/Suzuki engine)	2017
750	APS	BF	215.586	Watters G.	Suzuki	2010
750	APS	BG	209.81	Krebs K.	Suzuki	2009
750	APS	DB	121.212	Hayes F.	Hayes	2012
750	APS	PBF	126.217	Daly T.	Buell	2013
750	APS	PBG	133.952	Daly C.	Buell	2011
750	APS	PF	142.608	Leineweber J.	Triumph	2013
750	APS	VF	113.289	Hector T.	Harley-Davidson	2006
750	APS	VG	108.931	Hector T.	Harley-Davidson	2006
750	M	AF	168.201	Bertelsen C.	Suzuki	2019
750	M	AG	165.841	Bertelsen C.	Suzuki	2019
750	M	BF	182.292	McKechnie J.	Suzuki	2019
750	M	BG	200.27	Higgins J.	Suzuki	2009
750	M	CBF	96.823	Hulstrand M.	Honda	2016
750	M	CBG	63.802	Chambers C.	Honda	2018
750	M	CF	142.385	Duncan B.	Triumph	2019
750	M	CG	136.62	Weinhold D.	Honda	2018
750	M	D	107.11	Schmidt B.	HDTUSA	2008
750	M	DB	109.795	Hayes F.	HDTUSA	2009
750	M	P	130.502	Bricker B.	Honda	2011
750	M	PF	130.369	Azquith B.	BMW	2008
750	M	PG	159.903	Mellor T.	Triumph	2008
750	M	PP	128.692	Duncan B.	Triumph	2011
750	M	PV	72.614	Chance R.	Indian	2008
750	M	VBG	100.664	Kott F.	Triumph	2007
750	M	VG	101.142	Chance R.	Indian	2012
750	MPS	AF	178.912	Rains N.	Suzuki	2010
750	MPS	AG	191.203	Vickery W.	Yamaha	1975
750	MPS	BF	229.625	Krebs K.	Suzuki	2012
750	MPS	BG	215.389	Watters G.	Suzuki	2008
750	MPS	CF	148.323	Duncan B.	Triumph	2019
750	MPS	CG	145.906	Gosling R.	Triumph	2019
750	MPS	D	112.25	Schmidt B.	HDTUSA	2008
750	MPS	DB	116.628	Hayes F.	HDTUSA	2008
750	MPS	PF	146.351	Hooper S.	Velocette	2011
750	MPS	PG	180.317	Mellor T.	Triumph	2008
750	MPS	VBG	86.007	Kott F.	Triumph	2009
750	P	D	92.562	Hayes F.	HDTUSA	2008
750	P	P	170.786	Williams W.	Susuki	2016
750	P	PC	112.283	Magee R.	Honda	2017
750	P	PF	108.871	Hultstrand M.	Honda	2012
750	P	PG	99.814	Schill A.	Norton	2019
750	P	PP	129.649	Duncan B.	Triumph	2011
750	P	PV	95.318	Clough S.	Indian	2018
750	S	AF	240.747	Vesco D.	Yamaha	1975
750	S	AG	251.924	Vesco D.	Yamaha	1970
750	SC	AF	141.099	Skjorshammer H.	Pritchard	2012
750	SC	AG	136.204	Skjorshammer H.	Pritchard	2012
750	SC	P	64.686	Bryan B.	Ural	2021
750	SC	PV	57.802	Klinger M.	Harley-Davidson	2006
750	SC	UF	97.72	Scroggins R.	Speci. Const.	2010
750	SC	VBG	81.567	Kott F.	Harley-Davidson	2005
750	SC	VF	97.505	Kott F.	Harley-Davidson	2005
750	SC	VG	46.236	Logue M.	Harley-Davidson	2004
1000	A	AF	180.375	Omer J.	Yamaha	2013
1000	A	AG	178.925	Mateu J.	Yamaha	2014
1000	A	BF	183.037	Keep R.	Suzuki	2010
1000	A	BG	202.207	Scholz E.	Suzuki	2012
1000	A	CBF	143.52	Haner R.	Harley-Davidson	2019
1000	A	CBG	141.292	Zetterquist K.	Harley-Davidson	2012
1000	A	PBF	137.245	Axelson K.	Buell	2018
1000	A	PBG	137.653	Zetterquist K.	Harley-Davidson	2012
1000	A	PF	157.457	Duncan B.	Triumph	2014
1000	A	PG	156.552	Gosling R.	Triumph	2014
1000	A	VBF	129.118	Woods B.	Harley-Davidson	2018
1000	A	VBG	118.024	Omer J.	Harley-Davidson	2016
1000	A	VF	122.258	Kott F.	Harley-Davidson	2006
1000	A	VG	112.237	Kott F.	Harley-Davidson	2004
1000	APS	AF	203.864	Zlock D.	Kawasaki	2017
1000	APS	AG	198.342	Zlock D.	Kawasaki	2018
1000	APS	AG	203.794	Zlock D.	Kawasaki	2021
1000	APS	BF	176.802	Bartholomew D.	Kawasaki	2011
1000	APS	BF	207.238	Lamb A.	Honda	2021
1000	APS	BG	232.964	Hudson R.	Suzuki	2019
1000	APS	CBF	156.852	Haner R.	Harley-Davidson	2019
1000	APS	CBG	153.841	Zetterquist ".	Harley-Davidson	2014
1000	APS	PBF	156.72	Zetterquist K.	Harley-Davidson	2017
1000	APS	PBG	153.728	Zetterquist K.	Harley-Davidson	2013
1000	APS	PF	207.598	Mellor T.	Triumph	2018
1000	APS	PG	202.842	Mellor T.	Triumph	2016
1000	APS	VBG	116.601	Hector F.	Harley-Davidson	2011
1000	APS	VF	120.137	Kott F.	Harley-Davidson	2008
1000	APS	VG	116.935	Hector F.	Harley-Davidson	2010
1000	M	AF	195.675	Richter T.	BMW	2019
1000	M	AG	194.065	Sills E.	BMW	2016
1000	M	BF	181.041	King D.	Kawasaki	2019
1000	M	BG	188.45	McBride N.	Suzuki	2007
1000	M	CBF	177.983	Horst D.	Kawasaki	2013
1000	M	CBG	172.876	Horst D.	Kawasaki	2013
1000	M	CF	109.353	Hopkins T.	Honda	2018
1000	M	CG	135.115	Mills D.	Honda	2014
1000	M	P	177.718	Bivins J.	MV Agusta	2008
1000	M	PF	143.6	Rubin M.	Buell	2014
1000	M	PG	163.303	Mellor T.	Triumph	2011
1000	M	VF	145.804	Carlson K.	Vincent	2011
1000	M	VG	155.192	Dickerson M.	Vincent	2009
1000	MPS	AF	219.061	Hunter E.	BMW	2013
1000	MPS	AG	209.772	Sills E.	BMW	2016
1000	MPS	AG	213.205	Richter T.	BMW	2021
1000	MPS	BF	262.471	Lamb A.	Honda	2012
1000	MPS	BG	218.321	StarkweatherP.	Suzuki	2006
1000	MPS	CBF	124.681	Horst Jr. D.	Kawasaki	2017
1000	MPS	CBG	160.338	Horst Jr. D.	Kawasaki	2014
1000	MPS	CF	127.187	Canestrini B.	Honda	2014
1000	MPS	CF	130.629	Mitruk M.	Honda	2021
1000	MPS	CG	129.181	Honda T.	Honda	2016
1000	MPS	P	184.126	Sills A.	Suzuki	2009
1000	MPS	PF	146.521	Woodford D.	Harley-Davidson	2019
1000	MPS	PF	151.311	Kaoplelopono K.	Harley Davidson	2021
1000	MPS	PG	191.752	Mellor T.	Triumph	2011
1000	MPS	VG	131.684	Patterson E.	Norton/Vincent	2014
1000	P	AG	168.997	Bivins J.	MV Agusta	2007
1000	P	BF	161.188	Capri M.	Triumph	2008
1000	P	BG	165.405	Cathcart A.	Triumph	2009
1000	P	CF	103.83	Rogers J.	Harley-Davidson	2019
1000	P	CG	119.303	Gatewood C.	Harley-Davidson	2012
1000	P	P	207.904	Sills E.	BMW	2016
1000	P	PC	117.808	Gomez N.	Suzuki	2014
1000	P	PF	104.13	Rogers J.	Harley-Davidson	2019
1000	P	PG	101.596	Rogers J.	Harley-Davidson	2019
1000	P	PP	136.476	Cobb E.	Buell	2010
1000	S	AF	184.087	Munro B.	Indian	1967
1000	S	PG	87.078	Sherrer E.	Norton	2006
1000	SC	AF	155.465	Murray R.&N.	LCR/Suzuki	2012
1000	SC	AG	135.693	Murray R.	Suzuki	2010
1000	SC	BF	104.423	Tyner J.	Ducati	2021
1000	SC	BG	89.904	Marlow T.	Ducati	2021
1000	SC	CG	95.777	Cote D.	BMW	2017
1000	SC	P	103.131	Bier P.	BMW	2016
1000	SC	VF	96.509	Kott F.	Harley-Davidson	2006
1000	SCS	AG	188.612	Anderson C.	Suzuki	2013
1000	SCS	PF	129.786	Sherrer E.	Moto Guzzi	2013
1000	SCS	PG	131.833	Sherrer E.	Moto Guzzi	2013
1350	A	AF	198.659	McLachlan D.	Bones Built	2017
1350	A	AG	194.594	Mateu J.	Suzuki	2018
1350	A	BF	196.73	Dobbs J.	Suzuki	2010
1350	A	BG	204.005	Dobbs. J.	Suzuki	2009
1350	A	CF	128.437	Carpio F.	Suzuki	2017
1350	A	CF	150.359	Haughton B.	Honda	2021
1350	A	CG	149.875	Haughton B.	Honda	2021
1350	A	PBF	160.5	Rocho B.	Harley-Davidson	2019
1350	A	PBG	150.539	Joergensen T.	Harley-Davidson	2016
1350	A	PF	185.491	Wilson A.	Harley-Davidson	2009
1350	A	PG	169.477	Wilson A.	Harley-Davidson	2008
1350	A	VF	146.434	McLachlan D.	Vincent	2016
1350	A	VG	141.682	McLachlan D.	Vincent	2016
1350	APS	AF	211.671	Garcia M.	Suzuki	2009
1350	APS	AG	211.711	Garcia M.	Suzuki	2009
1350	APS	BF	240.735	Garcia M.	Suzuki	2016
1350	APS	BG	192.724	LaMarche J.	Suzuki	2018
1350	APS	BG	203.472	LaMarche J.	Suzuki	2021
1350	APS	CF	152.83	Mills D.	Suzuki	2019
1350	APS	CG	158.507	Mills D.	Suzuki	2019
1350	APS	P	201.772	Mills D.	Suzuki	2008
1350	APS	PBF	162.976	Joergensen T.	Harley-Davidson	2016
1350	APS	PBG	154.931	Joergensen T.	Harley-Davidson	2016
1350	APS	PF	172.731	Huff S.	Buell	2012
1350	APS	PG	176.51	Huff S.	Buell	2013
1350	APS	VF	139.816	Leeman R.	Harley-Davidson	2016
1350	APS	VG	140.668	Leeman R.	Harley-Davidson	2016
1350	M	AF	194.466	Okonek E.	Suzuki	2016
1350	M	AG	198.411	Okonek E.	Suzuki	2017
1350	M	BF	220.736	McLeod S.	Suzuki	2008
1350	M	BG	185.86	Gordon M.	Suzuki	2014
1350	M	CF	142.892	Mills D.	Sizuki	2018
1350	M	CG	144.867	Albrecht ".	Harley Davidson	2019
1350	M	P	191.484	Alter K.	Suzuki	2010
1350	M	PBG	150.828	Joergensen T.	Harley-Davidson	2012
1350	M	PF	169.743	Wilson S.	Harley-Davidson	2009
1350	M	PF	170.45	Rocho B.	Harley Davidson	2021
1350	M	PG	167.452	Dunn L.	Harley-Davidson	2013
1350	M	PP	143.502	Fischer J.	Harley-Davidson	2011
1350	M	PV	99.805	Bolduc J.	Indian	2009
1350	M	VF	109.055	Bolduc J.	Indian	2010
1350	M	VG	150.651	Hewett M.	Vincent	2010
1350	MPS	AF	219.775	Okonek E.	Suzuki	2017
1350	MPS	AG	223.981	Okonek E.	Suzuki	2017
1350	MPS	BF	239.821	Assen R.	Suzuki	2008
1350	MPS	BG	252.832	Noonan J.	Suzuki	2005
1350	MPS	CF	146.37	Mills D.	Suzuki	2018
1350	MPS	CG	145.894	Mills D.	Suzuki	2017
1350	MPS	P	205.724	Mills D.	Suzuki	2006
1350	MPS	PF	175.275	Rocho B.	Harley-Davidson	2014
1350	MPS	PG	174.274	Stauffler	Buell	2008
1350	MPS	PP	152.545	Huff S.	Buell	2008
1350	MPS	VF	112.901	Kesselring R.	Harley-Davidson	2011
1350	MPS	VG	162.004	Hewett M.	Vincent	2010
1350	P	CG	104.792	Curry G.		2016
1350	P	P	203.77	Deluca M.	Suzuki	2006
1350	P	PB	125.662	Pitlock R.	Kawasaki	2014
1350	P	PC	101.83	Carpio F.	Suzuki	2016
1350	P	PF	172.813	Versfeld H.	Suzuki	2010
1350	P	PG	136.282	Woodford A.	Buell	2019
1350	P	PG	139.634	Woodford A.	Buell	2021
1350	P	PP	150.936	Hunter E.	Buell	2012
1350	P	PV	97.393	Clift B.	Indian	2011
1350	P	VF	93.427	Clift B.	Indian	2021
1350	P	VG	97.305	Clift B.	Indian	2013
1350	S	AF	252.229	Vesco D.	Yamaha	1976
1350	S	AG	248.285	Vesco D.	Yamaha	1974
1350	S	PG	178.948	Wiley J.	Harley-Davidson	2006
1350	SC	AF	153.305	Meyer J.	Kawasaki	2009
1350	SC	AG	128.248	Ramirez S.	Suzuki	2018
1350	SC	BF	206.157	Egli F.	Suzuki-Egli	2009
1350	SC	BG	158.2	Coleman L.	Suzuki	2011
1350	SC	PF	154.485	Speranza R.	Custom	2006
1350	SC	PG	136.67	Reister K.	Harley-Davidson	2018
1350	SC	PG	138.599	Reister K.	Harley Davidson	2021
1350	SC	VF	149.808	McLachlan D.	Vincent	2012
1350	SC	VG	124.412	Foley T.	Harley-Davidson	2013
1350	SCS	BF	179.065	Bohnhorst R.	SSC 1	2019
1350	SCS	BF	201.84	Bohnhorst R.	SCC1	2021
1500	A	D	83.506	Nichols C.	Suzuki	2012
1500	A	DB	102.159	Nichols C.	Suzuki	2013
1500	APS	D	86.751	Nichols C.	Suzuki	2012
1500	APS	DB	102.675	Nichols C.	Suzuki	2013
1500	SC	DB	86.656	Nichols C.	Suzuki	2013
1650	A	AF	193.202	Knecum S.	Suzuki	2006
1650	A	AG	185.635	Omer J.	Kawasaki	2016
1650	A	BF	192.54	Horner S.	Suzuki	2010
1650	A	BG	218.217	Higgins J.	Suzuki	2016
1650	A	PBF	168.248	Rocho B.	Harley-Davidson	2018
1650	A	PBG	150.706	Joergensen J.	Knucklehead	2014
1650	A	PF	191.631	Wilson A.	Harley-Davidson	2010
1650	A	PG	171.251	Fischer J.	Harley-Davidson	2016
1650	A	VBF	131.014	Pilgrim D.	Harley-Davidson	2009
1650	A	VBG	136.848	Pilgrim D.	Harley-Davidson	2009
1650	APS	AF	219.347	Williams J.	Suzuki	2012
1650	APS	AG	215.136	Cauby J.	Suzuki	2012
1650	APS	BF	243.329	Watters G.	Suzuki	2016
1650	APS	BG	241.193	Krebs K.	Suzuki	2016
1650	APS	PBF	207.803	Perewitz J.	Perewitz	2013
1650	APS	PBG	189.655	Perewitz J.	Perewitz	2012
1650	APS	PF	187.454	Fischer J.	S&S/Harley-Davidson	2014
1650	APS	PG	191.397	Fischer J.	Harley-Davidson	2016
1650	APS	VF	134.058	Hector F.	Harley-Davidson	2019
1650	M	AF	209.598	Williams J.	Suzuki	2012
1650	M	AG	196.053	Warner B.	Yamaha	2007
1650	M	BF	215.984	Cole J.	Suzuki	2018
1650	M	BG	214.547	Cole J.	Suzuki	2018
1650	M	PBF	155.052	Degen C.	Harley-Davidson	2011
1650	M	PBF	181.881	Klock B.	Harley-Davidson	2021
1650	M	PBG	155.538	Klock B.	Harley-Davidson	2011
1650	M	PBG	173.743	Klock B.	Harley-Davidson	2021
1650	M	PF	172.872	Fischer J.	Harley-Davidson	2013
1650	M	PG	174.946	Fischer J.	Harley-Davidson	2013
1650	M	VF	98.035	Thomas R.	Indian	2009
1650	M	VG	126.555	McAvoy S.	Harley-Davidson	2005
1650	MPS	AF	226.611	Williams J.	Suzuki	2012
1650	MPS	AG	214.108	Garcia M.	Suzuki	2011
1650	MPS	BF	232.972	Cole J.	Suzuki	2018
1650	MPS	BG	226.264	Cole J.	Suzuki	2018
1650	MPS	PBG	157.493	Reiser T.	Harley-Davidson	2009
1650	MPS	PF	213.193	Horton T.	Buell	2006
1650	MPS	PG	187.092	Amo J.	HD Buell	2005
1650	MPS	VF	147.454	Friebus	Harley-Davidson	2009
1650	P	P	189.041	SchererW.	Kawasaki	2006
1650	P	PG	163.982	Case B.	Motus	2014
1650	P	PP	165.812	Conn L.	Motus	2014
1650	P	VF	100.727	Clift B.	Indian	2018
1650	P	VG	92.123	Clift B.	Indian	2016
1650	SC	VG	116.433	Foley T.	Harley-Davidson	2012
1650	SCS	AF	154.324	Renwick J.	Vincent	2008
2000	A	AF	201.432	Angerer J.	Triumph	1973
2000	A	AG	203.74	Bjorklund M.	Ducati	2016
2000	A	PBF	213.644	Minonno J.	S&S	2008
2000	A	PBG	192.386	Allen J.	Harley-Davidson	2019
2000	A	PBG	197.554	Allen J.	Harley Davidson	2021
2000	A	PF	178.449	Yurko M.	Harley-Davidson	2016
2000	A	PG	177.376	Yurko M.	Harley-Davidson	2018
2000	APS	AF	206.544	Riley W.	Harley-Davidson	1972
2000	APS	AG	169.828	Angerer J.	Triumph	1973
2000	APS	PBF	218.838	Minonno J.	Harley-Davidson	2008
2000	APS	PBG	229.794	Allen J.	Harley-Davidson	2018
2000	APS	PF	196.795	Kusunoki H.	Harley-Davidson	2019
2000	APS	PG	195.851	Anderson J.	Buell	2016
2000	M	AF	199.5	Riley W.	Harley-Davidson	1974
2000	M	AG	180.498	Omer J.	Yamaha	2018
2000	M	AG	185.23	Garcia M.	Suzuki	2021
2000	M	BG	173.223	Klock B.	Victory/ Polaris	2014
2000	M	P	143.154	Mielke M.	Yamaha	2009
2000	M	PF	169.964	Allen J.	Big Boar	2013
2000	M	PG	171.311	Klinger R.	Harley-Davidson	2008
2000	MPS	AF	220.88	Garcia M.	Suzuki	2014
2000	MPS	AG	173.832	Riley W.	Harley-Davidson	1971
2000	MPS	AG	187.509	Garcia M.	Suzuki	2021
2000	MPS	BF	232.523	Porterfield L.	Suzuki	2008
2000	MPS	BG	168.081	Klock B.	Victory/Polaris	2013
2000	MPS	P	143.725	Mielke M.	Yamaha	2010
2000	MPS	PBG	141.607	Hall R.	Harley-Davidson	2006
2000	MPS	PF	192.868	Wilson A.	Buell	2007
2000	MPS	PG	180.673	Horton T.	Buell	2008
2000	P	P	166.057	Mateo J.	Yamaha	2017
2000	S	AF	265.492	Rayborn C.	Harley-Davidson	1970
2000	S	AG	303.812	Vesco D.	Yamaha	1975
2000	S	PG	217.685	Klinger F.	Harley-Davidson	2008
2000	SC	PBG	167.874	Eller Jr W.	Harley-Davidson	2006
3000	A	AF	188.006	Elrod T.	Kawasaki	1977
3000	A	AG	188.692	Elrod T.	Kawasaki	1976
3000	A	CF	115.089	Carpio F.	Suzuki	2019
3000	A	PBF	226.1	Koiso H.	Harley-Davidson / JIMS	2017
3000	A	PBG	216.818	Koiso H.	Harley-Davidson / JIMS	2017
3000	A	PF	177.596	Hoegh J.	Confederate	2013
3000	A	PG	176.936	Bozzie D.	Bozzie Custom	2010
3000	A	PP	139.62	Cook B.	Kawasaki	2005
3000	APS	AF	231.597	Campos D.	Harley-Davidson	1974
3000	APS	AG	208.45	Campos D.	Harley-Davidson	1974
3000	APS	DB	130.55	Sturtz M.	BMW	2007
3000	APS	PBF	211.032	Koiso H.	Harley-Davidson	2014
3000	APS	PBG	241.983	Rivas C.	Harley-Davidson	2016
3000	APS	PBG	248.783	Koiso H.	Harley Davidson	2021
3000	APS	PF	171.005	Hoegh J.	Confederate	2014
3000	APS	PG	201.707	Rivas C.	Harley-Davidson	2012
3000	M	AF	176.933	Ragle J.	Triumph	2017
3000	M	AG	172.045	Ragle J.	Triumph	2016
3000	M	PBF	190.413	Koiso H.	Harley-Davidson	2011
3000	M	PBG	188.509	Koiso H.	Harley-Davidson	2011
3000	M	PF	176.758	Allen J.	Big Boar	2012
3000	M	PG	189.074	Bailey J.	Buell	2012
3000	MPS	AF	174.914	Ragle J.	Triumph	2018
3000	MPS	AG	163.567	Allen J.	Harley-Davidson	2010
3000	MPS	PBF	214.342	Koiso H.	Harley-Davidson	2013
3000	MPS	PBG	210.646	Koiso H.	Harley-Davidson	2013
3000	MPS	PF	176.61	Allen J.	Big Boar	2011
3000	MPS	PG	195.732	Bailey J.	Buell	2012
3000	P	BG	175.244	Paulgaard J.	Harley-Davidson	2010
3000	P	PP	132.744	Cook J.	Kawasaki	2007
3000	S	AF	322.87	Campos D.	Harley-Davidson	1990
3000	S	AG	197.047	Elrod T.	Harley-Davidson	1974
3000	S	BF	367.382	Carr C.	BUB	2009
3000	S	BG	348.178	Robinson R.	Ack Tech.	2006
3000	S	VBF	217.921	Angel D.	Vincent	2007
