= Goldenrod (car) =

Streamliner automobile

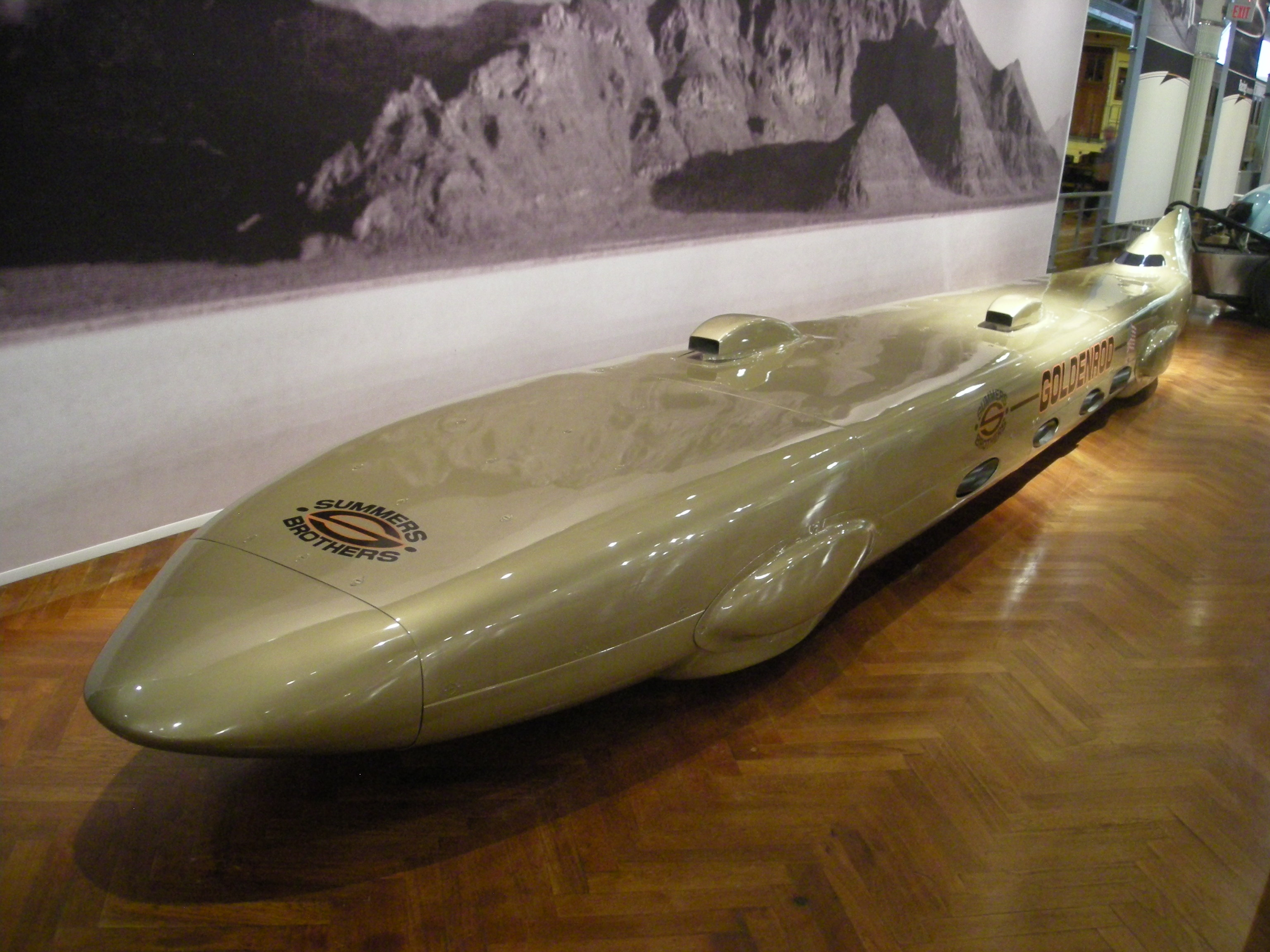
Goldenrod on display at the Henry Ford Museum in 2012.

Goldenrod is an American streamliner land speed racing car which held the wheel-driven land speed record from 1965 to 1991. It was owned by Bob "Butch" and Bill Summers, of Ontario, California. Bob Summers drove the car to set the land speed record. The car is powered by four fuel injected Chrysler Hemi engines mounted inline and created a total output of 2,400 hp (1,800 kW). The car was originally built in Southern California by a team that included James Crosby.

Before finding their final success, the two brothers contacted a fuel specialist and racing equipment pioneer and inventor named Tony Capanna, owner of Wilcap Co. (at that time in Torrance California). They were having trouble getting the speed they wanted with the 4 engines set in 2 rows side by side. Capanna suggested they put the engines in line and have it streamlined. In this configuration it was called Goldenrod. Capanna advised them to get aerodynamic advice from a Lockheed engineer, Walter Korff. The Goldenrod configuration was refined during a wind tunnel test in the Caltech 10-foot (3.0 m) wind tunnel. The resulting drag coefficient of 0.1165, with a frontal area of 8.53 sq ft (0.792 m^{2}), is one of the lowest ever achieved for a car. A scale model of the proposed car was shown to Hot Rod's managing editor Dick Wells in August 1964.

The brothers found success on November 12, 1965, when Goldenrod set the wheel-driven record (a class introduced due to the controversy over Spirit of America) at 409.277 mph (658.667 km/h) over the flying mile, an FIA record which was held for 42 years 9 months and 14 days. The record was unofficially broken in 1991 by Al Teague with his supercharged Hemi-powered Spirit of '76, which went 409.986 mph (659.809 km/h), short of the one percent increase (to at least 413.36977 mph (665.25416 km/h)) required for an official record which would have been. Later the Burklands' 411 Streamliner set the official new record at 415.896 mph (669.320 km/h) on 2008/09/26 (Class AI-I-11). Goldenrod was not supercharged, so it still held the class (AI-II-11) record until 21 September 2010, when Charles Nearburg in the Spirit of Rett increased this to 414.316 mph (666.777 km/h). The car went on tour for many years all across the U.S., then first ventured outside the country in 2000, when she was placed where the cricket pitch is, with the other land speed record cars, at the Goodwood Festival of Speed. The surviving Summers brother, Bill, attended. (Bob died in 1992).

The Henry Ford museum bought the car in 2002, restored her via a US government grant (Save America's Treasures), and had her on display as of September 2006. The restoration was performed by former Hot Rod Magazine editor John Baechtel of Landspeed Restorations and Mike Cook of Cook Motorsports, with grateful acknowledgment to the many contributors who supported the project. Baechtel subsequently published a 300-page book about the Summers Brothers and the restoration of Goldenrod, entitled "Goldenrod: The Resurrection of America's Speed King".

“It’s about time it went away,” Bill Summers told "LandSpeed" Louise Ann Noeth during an interview on the new record, “It’s been a long time to have that record - 44 years, 10 months and 12 days. My brother Butch and I did everything we could with that car and then sold it to the Henry Ford Museum."

Speaking of Charles Nearburg finally breaking his brother's record, Bill Summers said, "That he [Nearburg] achieved those speeds with only two-wheel drive and one naturally aspirated engine is a phenomenal achievement, but they had good course conditions and when conditions are good, cars go fast." Bill Summers died on 12 May 2011.
