= Donovan hemi =

American drag racing engine

The Donovan hemi is an American Top Fuel drag racing engine, designed and built by Ed Donovan and first appearing in 1971. In the 1970s, it was the most popular engine in Top Fuel dragsters.

== History ==
Donovan developed the 417 cu in (6,830 cc) hemi-head V8 to overcome the tendency of 392 cu in (6,420 cc) Chryslers, then used by Top Fuel racers (many of them friends and customers of his), to crack their iron blocks.

He copied the 392 cu in (6,420 cc), which he admired, but tried to eliminate its deficiencies. Donovan milled all the internal oil and water passages, and (unlike the stock 392) sleeved the block with chrome-moly cylinder liners, which were stronger as well as easy to replace. Donovan also enlarged the supports for the main bearings, which Chrysler would do with the B-block. Cast from aluminium rather than iron, the engine weighed under 200 lb (91 kg) bare, compared to 740 lb (340 kg) for the Chrysler. Because it closely followed the Chrysler's specification, many hot rodding parts would fit it; only the bore was different, being 1/8 in (3.2 mm) larger, at 4.125 in (104.8 mm) (same as the 400 cu in (6,600 cc) Chevrolet.

Donovan completed work on the engine in 1970, and first sold it in 1971; the first driver to use a Donovan hemi was "Kansas John" Wiebe, at the 1971 NHRA Super Nationals, where Wiebe very nearly won Top Fuel. By 1972, it was commonplace in Top Fuel dragsters, and Altereds would also use it. In 1977, Donovan persuaded "Big Daddy" Don Garlits to switch from the 426 hemi he had been using for the last thirteen years to the 417 cu in (6,830 cc), offering (in Garlits' words), “an engine deal I couldn’t refuse”.
