= George Poteet =

American land speed racer (1948–2024)

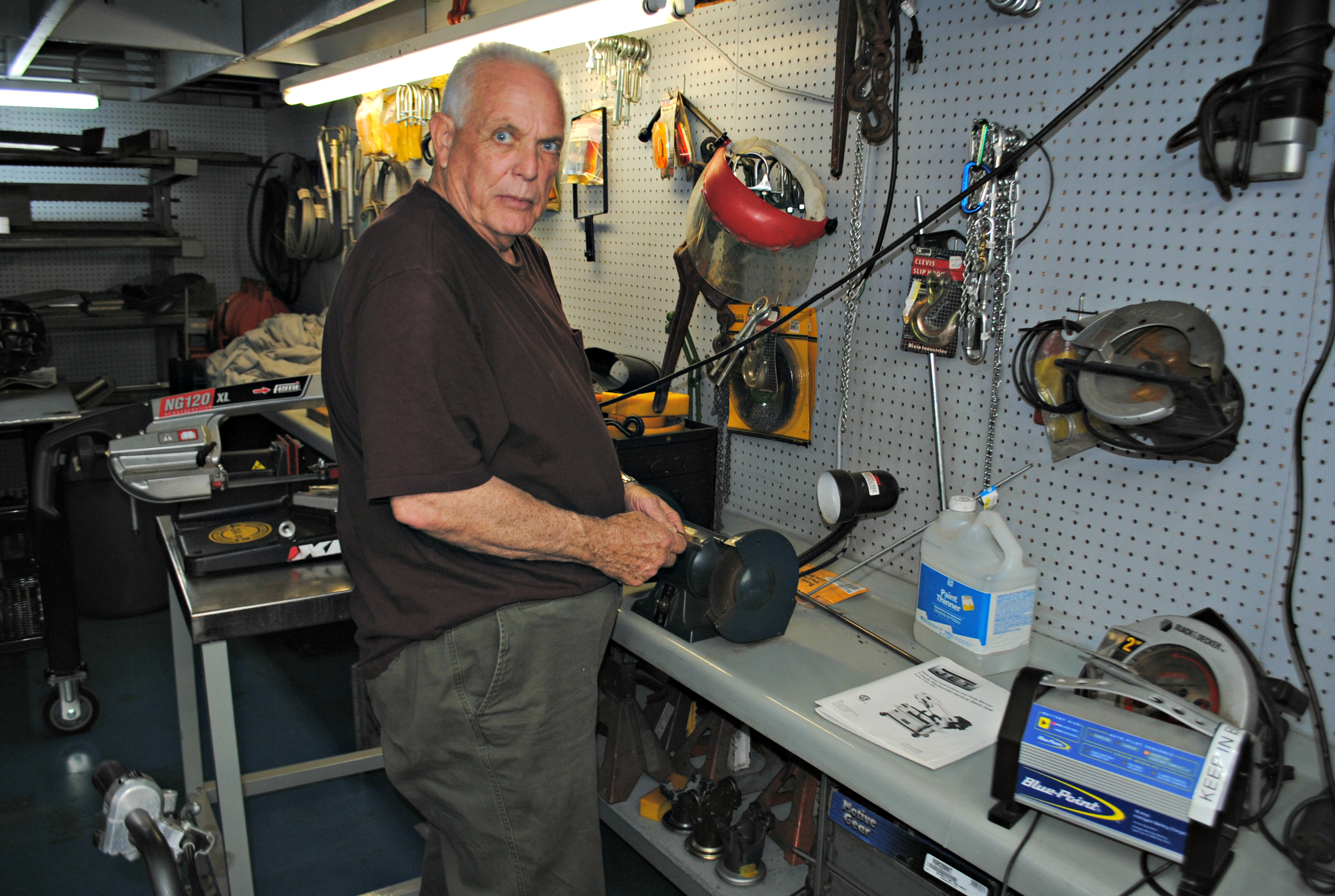
George Poteet in 2015

George Poteet (February 22, 1948 – July 16, 2024) was an American Memphis-based land speed racer and winner of the 1996 Ridler Award.

Poteet's 1937 Ford roadster (built by Don Pilkenton) won the 1996 Ridler Award. This car would go on to take "America's Most Beautiful Roadster", top prize at the Oakland Roadster Show.

In 2011, Poteet drove Speed Demon (built by Ron Main) to 426 mph (686 km/h) at Bonneville, and eventually broke both the C/BFS and D/BFS (supercharged fuel streamliner) records. After making "the fastest piston engine pass ever", Speed Demon was displayed at the 2018 Detroit Autorama.

== Personal life and death ==
Poteet was born on February 22, 1948, in Mantachie, Mississippi. His father was a sharecropper and his mother worked at a garment factory. Growing up, he tinkered on his family's car. He worked at National Safety Associates (later Juice Plus) from 1970 to 2020.

Poteet married Cathy in 1990, with whom he raised four children. He was married twice before.

Poteet died on July 16, 2024, at the age of 76, of a pulmonary embolism.
