= Speed Demon (car) =

Land speed racing car built in 2010

Speed Demon at Bonneville in 2010

Speed Demon is a land speed racing car built in 2010 by Ron Main for George Poteet.

In September 2010, George Poteet made a serious attempt to break the flying mile and flying kilometer record for piston-engined wheel-driven cars. Speed Demon is powered by a 299 cu in (4,900 cc) aluminum block 'Hellfire' V8, built by Kenny Duttweiler. Their effort was thwarted by a number of parts failures. The team stated their intention to return in 2011 to set a record over 450 mph (724 km/h), and at the 2011 Bonneville Speed Week, Poteet achieved 426 mph (686 km/h)

The Speed Demon then made "the fastest piston engine pass ever", turning in a two-way average of 437.183 mph (703.578 km/h). (Because this was not done within the two-hour limit demanded by FIA, the record is not considered official.)

In 2012, Speed Demon set an official record at 439 mph (707 km/h).

Speed Demon was displayed at the 2018 Detroit Autorama.

Poteet intended to attempt the absolute record for wheel-driven cars, currently held by Don Vesco’s Turbinator, but died on July 16, 2024. Poteet was replaced by Chris Raschke, who drove the car until his death on August 3, 2025, in a crash during that year's Bonneville Speed Week.
