= Larry Coleman (motorcyclist) =

Larry Coleman is the most successful sidecar roadracer in the United States, winning three American Motorcyclist Association (AMA) national championships ('76, '77, '79), and a land-speed record holder in sidecar divisions. He was inducted into the AMA Motorcycle Hall of Fame in 2010.

Stationed in Germany with the military in the late 1960s, Coleman in fall of 1968 founded a motorcycle club with fellow US soldiers, named "Bones MC", after a MAD magazine cartoon with a cigarette in a skeleton hand. The club, originally based at Frankfurt, predates the first German charter of the Hells Angels, founded 1973 in Hamburg, by several years. The Bones also accepted German members, expanded to Mannheim and other cities, and became the largest MC in Germany. With US members returning after their service, Germans took over, and the Bones MC turned into an "outlaw motorcycle club", until in 1999 16 of the 21 chapters merged ("patch-over") with the smaller Hells Angels MC of Germany.

Watching the 1969 German motorcycle Grand Prix at Hockenheimring, Coleman got hooked to sidecars and sidecar racing, riding a BMW R69S with sidecar. Upon returning to the States, Coleman raced a Kawasaki H1 Mach III 500cc sidecar with passenger Wendell Andrews with immediate success in American Federation of Motorcyclists (AFM) and AMA racing, missing the AMA Championship in 1973 at Laguna Seca by finishing runner up. In 1974, Coleman/Andrews imported a state-of-the-art sidecar racing chassis from England, installed a Suzuki GT750 engine, and dominated both AFM and AMA racing for the next several years, winning two AMA national Championships in 1976–77.

After Andrews retired from racing in late 1977, Coleman teamed up with Mark Bevans to contest and win the AMA Championship in 1979. The team built a new chassis for 1980, powered by a Yamaha TZ750, and won the sidecar support race at the 1981 Formula1 Long Beach Grand Prix, which put the team on the cover of Cycle News, as well as earning them articles in Cycle World Magazine, American Motorcyclist and other publications. At the end of the 1981 season, Coleman retired from full-time sidecar racing to pursue a career in the motorcycle industry, where he held sales manager positions with Kal Gard Lubricants, Supertrapp Industries, and K&N Filters.

In 1988, Coleman started to compete at the Bonneville Salt Flats with a racing sidecar. He holds since 2011 an Bonneville Motorcycle Speed Trials AMA national record with a 1350cc Suzuki sidecar at 158.2 mph. At one time he had as many as four records, one of which stood for 17 years. The top was 174 mph.
