= Buckeye Bullet =

Electric cars created by Ohio State University

The Buckeye Bullet is a series of four experimental electric cars created by students from Ohio State University (a.k.a. the Buckeyes) as a joint project with Venturi. The cars were designed to break the land speed record on the Bonneville Speedway, a salt flat just outside Wendover, Utah, United States. The team first achieved its goal in October 2004, at 271.737 mph (437.318 km/h) for the one mile world record, repeatedly increasing the record until setting a mile world record of 307.666 mph (495.140 km/h), in 2009, and a one kilometer world record of 341.264 mph (549.211 km/h), in 2016.

The VBB's have also been called the Venturi "Jamais Contente", referencing the first electrically powered vehicle to top 100 km/h.

== Buckeye Bullet Team ==
The Buckeye Bullet team is composed of students from Ohio State University, primarily through the College of Engineering. Led by Dr. Giorgio Rizzoni, the team is provided research space from the Center of Automotive Research at the university.

== Vehicles ==
All Buckeye Bullet vehicles have been electrically powered, with power coming from either batteries or hydrogen fuel cells.

Vehicle	U.S. Record	World record (km)	World record (mile)	Power Source
Buckeye Bullet 1	314.958 mph (508.485 km/h)		271.737 mph (437.318 km/h) (Non-FIA)	Battery (NiMH)
Buckeye Bullet 2		303.025 mph (487.672 km/h)	302.877 mph (487.433 km/h)	Hydrogen Fuel Cell
Buckeye Bullet 2.5		307.905 mph (495.526 km/h)	307.666 mph (495.140 km/h)	Battery (Li-ion)
Buckeye Bullet 3		341.264 mph (549.43 km/h)		Battery (Li-ion)

=== Buckeye Bullet 1 ===
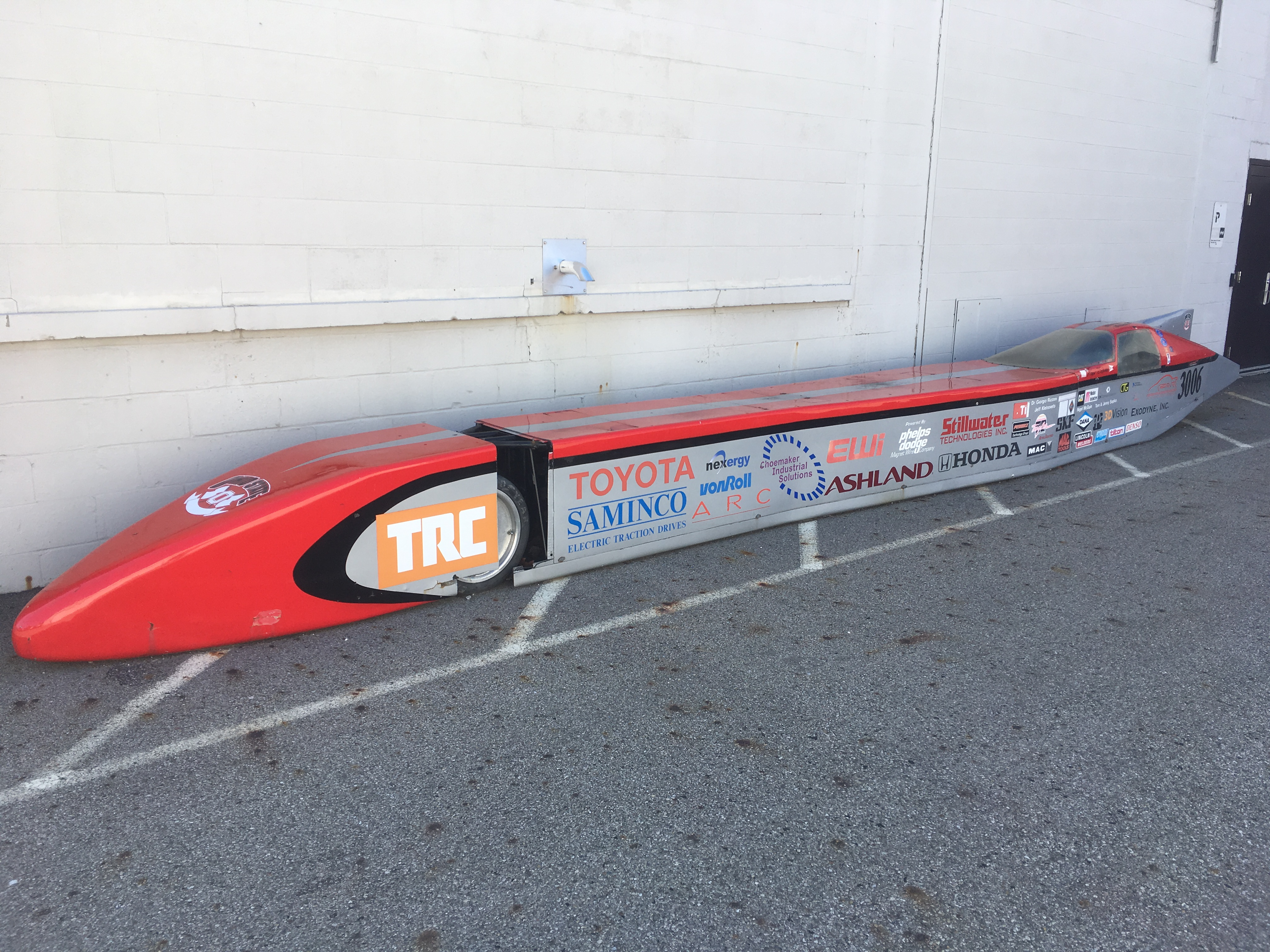
Buckeye Bullet 1 in February 2018 in Columbus, Ohio

The Buckeye Bullet 1 is a battery electric powered land speed race car, and the first from the Buckeye Bullet team.

The Buckeye Bullet 1 held the record for the world's fastest electric car, with a top recorded speed of 321.834 mph (517.942 km/h). It held the U.S. electric land speed record at 314.958 mph (506.876 km/h) (Class III/E). It set a BNI (non-FIA) recognized international record at 271.737 mph (437.318 km/h) on October 3, 2004.

Vehicle properties

- Power source: 10,000 rechargeable c-cell batteries
- Motor: Custom 400 horsepower (300 kilowatts) 3-phase AC power motor
- Layout: rear-wheel drive
- Body material: carbon fiber
- Ride height/ground clearance: 1.5 in (38 mm)
- Curb weight: 4,000 pounds (1,800 kg)
- Length: 31 ft (9.4 m)
- Suspension: 4 wheel independent

Team

The 2004 Buckeye Bullet team members from Ohio State are team leaders Isaac S. Harper, Andrew L. Marquand, and Benjamin J. Sinsheimer; team members Kevin C. Sze, Sean M. MacGregor, Aaron M. Haliena, Joseph H. Gorse, Andrea J. Barger, Michael B. Quade, Kimberly A. Stevens and Kevin Ponziani; faculty adviser Giorgio Rizzoni, staff adviser Maria Soliman, and the vehicle's driver, Roger Schroer of TRC, Inc.

=== Buckeye Bullet 2 ===
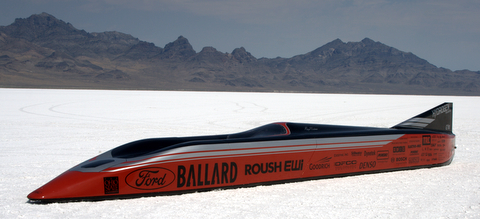
The 2007 Buckeye Bullet 2

The Buckeye Bullet 2, or BB2, was the second-generation, student-built, alternative-fuel race car created by the Buckeye Bullet team. It is the first hydrogen fuel cell vehicle land speed streamliner. It is front-wheel drive. The Buckeye Bullet 2 ran for the first time at Speedweek 2007 and recorded a top speed of 223.334 mph (359.421 km/h) on Oct. 10, 2007. At Speedweek 2008, the BB2 eclipsed its previous mark by reaching 286.476 mph (461.038 km/h), the highest speed ever recorded by a hydrogen/fuel cell vehicle at that time.

On September 25, 2009, the Buckeye Bullet 2 set international land speed records both at 303.025 mph (487.671 km/h) in the flying kilometer and 302.877 mph (487.433 km/h) in the flying mile.

=== Buckeye Bullet 2.5 ===
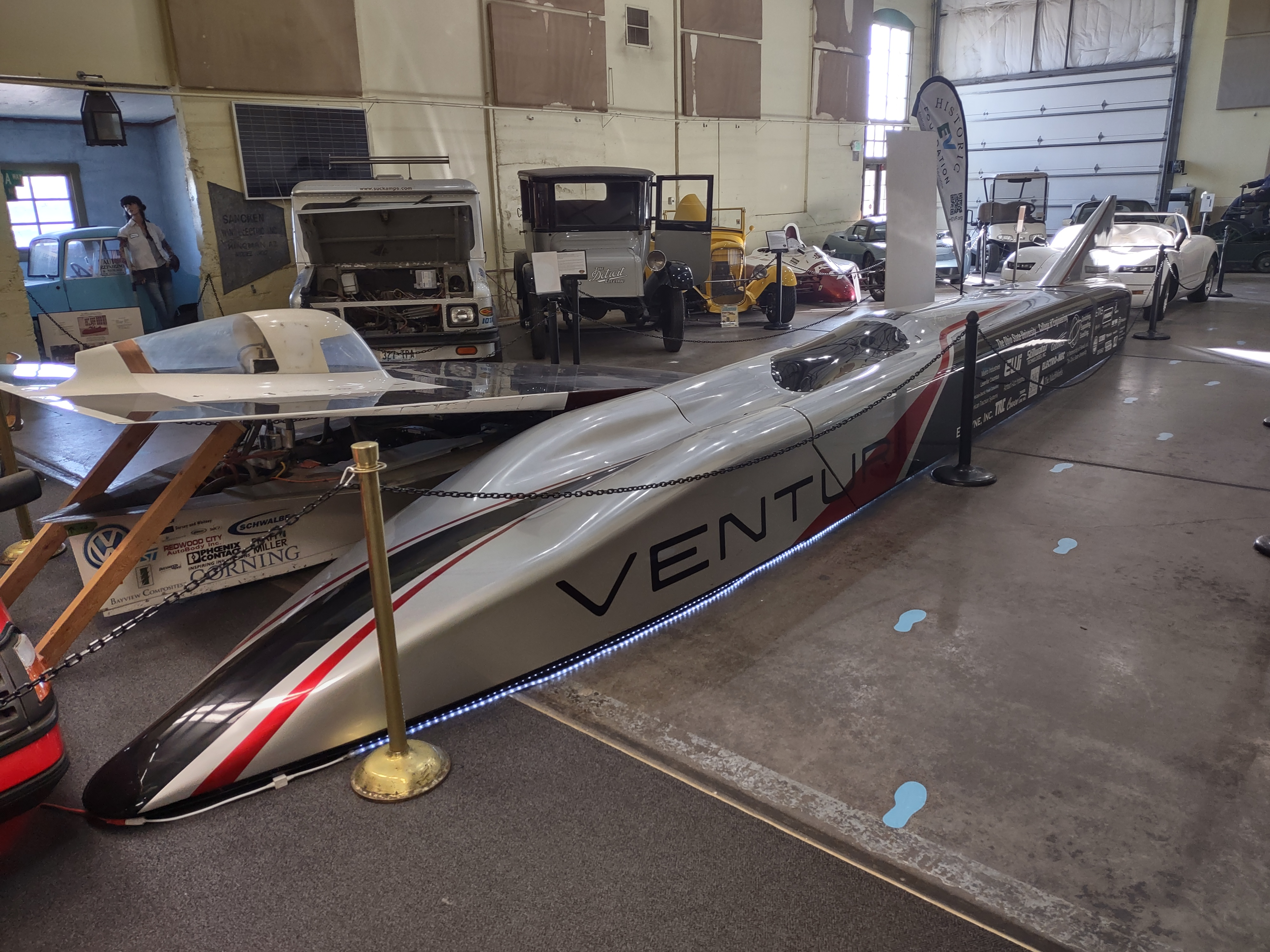
Buckeye Bullet 2.5 in Kingman Arizona, 2023

The Buckeye Bullet 2.5 was a battery electric version of the Buckeye Bullet 2. The BB2.5 uses the same frame and body as the Buckeye Bullet 2, but replaces the fuel cell power source with batteries. The BB2.5 raced for only one season in 2009. This vehicle was intended to be a testbed for several new technologies in consideration for use on the Buckeye Bullet 3. The most significant technology under consideration was the lithium-ion batteries. The batteries used for the BB2.5 were A123 Systems 32113 cylindrical cells. The vehicle was able to set a FIA sanctioned world record at 307.666 mph
(495.140 km/h).

=== Buckeye Bullet 3 ===
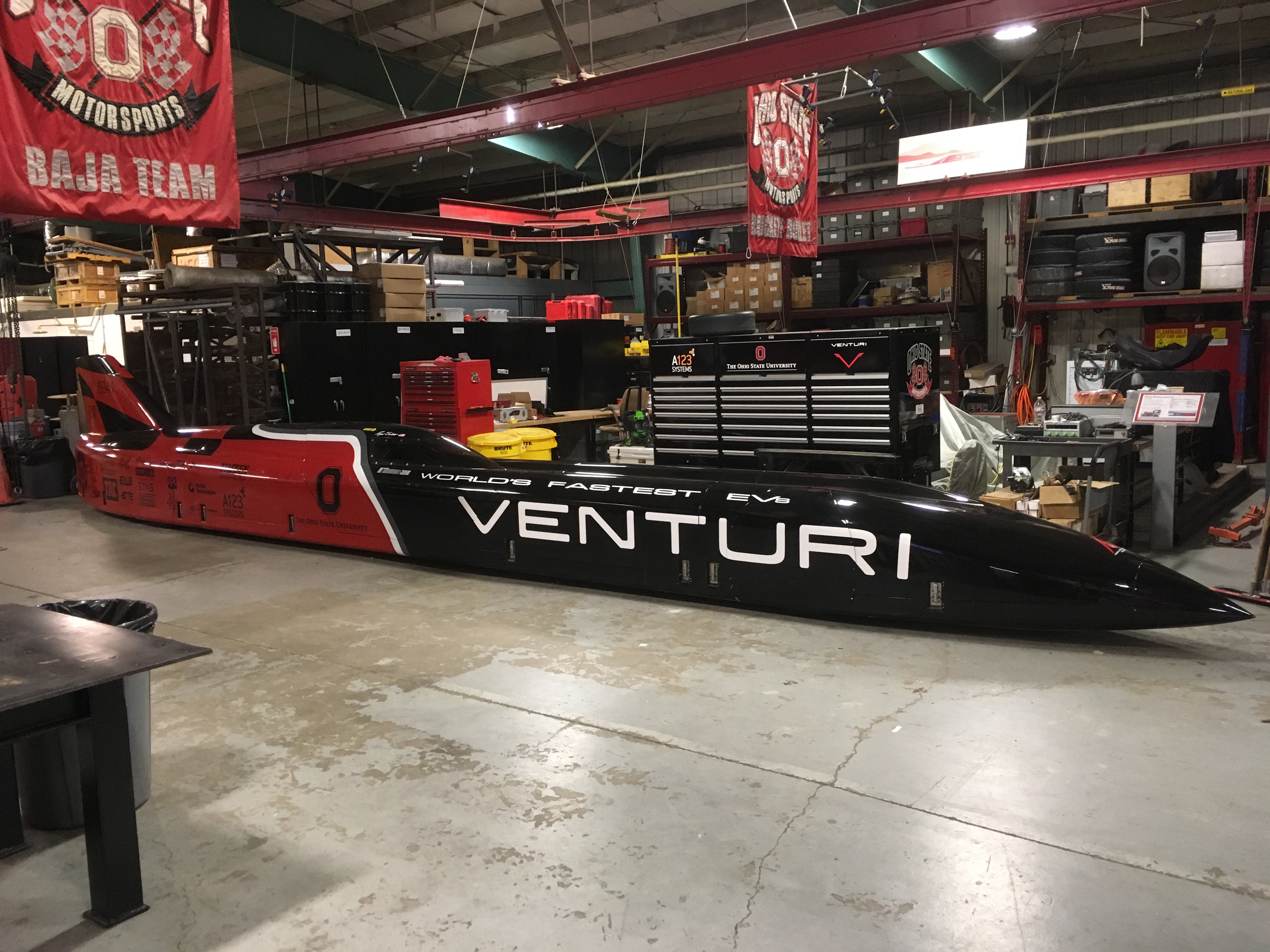
Buckeye Bullet 3 in February 2017 in Columbus Ohio

The Buckeye Bullet 3 is the final iteration of the project, building on the technology of the previous vehicles. It is 4-wheel drive and has a drag coefficient of 0.13. The car has separate powertrains for each axle, with the cockpit in the center. Each powertrain has two electric motors driving a 2-speed transmission, built by Hewland. 1st gear can be used up to 275 mph. On September 19, 2016, the Buckeye Bullet 3 achieved a new world record with a speed of 341.4 mph (549.4 km/h), beating its own previous record of 308 mph (496 km/h). Roger Schroer was the driver for the record breaking run.

== See also ==
- List of vehicle speed records
