= Charlie Nearburg =

American racecar driver

Charles Nearburg (born September 6, 1950) is a race car driver who broke the wheel-driven land speed record in 2010.

Born in Dallas, Nearburg founded Nearburg Exploration, an oil and gas exploration firm that became one of the largest independent oil and gas explorers in the country. He used his profits from his successful business to finance his auto racing career, becoming a long time Toyota Atlantic competitor. In 1997, he drove in the 24 Hours of Le Mans in a Ferrari 333 SP for Pilot Motorsports and funded three appearances in the CART Champ Car series for Dale Coyne Racing. Coyne is particularly proud of the progress Nearburg made while with the team, stating in a 2004 interview: “Charlie Nearburg is an example I love – he was a guy that was older, he was married, he had kids and always wanted to do these races. So he came with us, and did three races, and we pushed him a little bit, but by the time he got to his third race, he was very respectable – and he’s got that to carry with him the rest of his life.” Nearburg retired from professional racing after his Champ Car experience. He is listed as a Ferrari 250 GTO owner.

In September 2010, driving the Spirit of Rett, Nearburg broke Goldenrod's wheel-driven land speed record at a speed of 414.4 mph at the Bonneville Salt Flats using a General Motors racing V-8 engine.

Nearburg graduated from St. Mark's School of Texas in 1968 and later served on its board of trustees for 20 years. He received degrees from Dartmouth in 1972, 1973, and 1974, the latter two being engineering degrees. He later served on the engineering school's board of overseers. He has also been philanthropically involved in pediatric cancer research, environmental protection, and the arts.

== Spirit of Rett ==
On September 21, 2010, the Spirit of Rett made two high-speed runs. The first run averaged 417 MPH with an exit speed of 422.6. The return run, made under more difficult track conditions, averaged 411.7 MPH with a top speed of 417.65. The average speed of approximately 414.4 MPH exceeded the 45 year old Summers brothers’ Goldenrod record. The “Spirit of Rett” now has one of the fastest single engine car record in history.

=== Accomplishments ===
- Fastest single-engine car record in history 414.316 MPH as of September 21, 2010 (and only 3 mph less than the absolute fastest "real car" record of 417.020 MPH held by Tom Burkland)
- Fastest normally aspirated car in history (Broke 45-year-old record set by Summer's Bros. "Goldenrod" on Nov 12, 1965)
- First and only unblown single-engine car over 400 MPH
- First and only car to ever set two over 300 MPH records in one day
- First and only car to ever hold all four of the fastest unblown records at Bonneville at the same time A/FS 379.6 MPH, A/GS 353.825 MPH, AA/GS 368.136 MPH, AA/FS 392.503 MPH
- First and only car to ever hold the two fastest unblown FIA records at the same time
- At the 2011 FIA Landspeed Shootout held in September, the “Spirit of Rett” increased its FIA Category A, Group II, Class 10 record to 366.59 MPH.

== Career results ==
=== American Open-Wheel racing results ===
==== CART ====
Year	Team	No.	Chassis	Engine	1	2	3	4	5	6	7	8	9	10	11	12	13	14	15	16	17	Rank	Points	Ref
1997	Dale Coyne Racing	34	Lola T97	Ford XD	MIA	SRF	LBH	NZR	RIO	STL	MIL	DET	POR	CLE; 23	TOR	MIS	MDO; DNS					32nd	0	
1997	Dale Coyne Racing	34	Reynard 97i	Ford XD														ROA; 17	VAN	LAG; 18	FON	32nd	0	

=== 24 Hours of Le Mans results ===
Year	Team	Co-Drivers	Car	Class	Laps	Pos.	Class Pos.
1997	(France) Pilot Racing	(Spain) Adrián Campos (France) Michel Ferté	Ferrari 333 SP	LMP	18	DNF	DNF

== See also ==
- Notable alumni of St. Mark's School of Texas
