= Spirit of Rett =

The Spirit of Rett is a streamlined car designed to challenge the wheel-driven land speed record. On September 21, 2010 it made two speed runs piloted by Charlie Nearburg at the Bonneville Salt Flats. The first run averaged 417.0 mph (671.1 km/h) with an exit speed of 422.6 mph (680.1 km/h). The return run, made under more difficult track conditions, averaged 411.7 mph (662.6 km/h) with a top speed of 417.65 mph (672.14 km/h). The average speed of approximately 414.4 mph (666.9 km/h) exceeded the 45 year old Summers brothers’ Goldenrod record. The “Spirit of Rett” now has the fastest single engine car record in history.

The car was named after Nearburg's son who died in 2005.

== Accomplishments ==
(Source:)

- Fastest single engine car record in history 414.316 MPH as of September 21, 2010 (and only 3 mph less than the absolute fastest "real car" record of 417.020 MPH held by Tom Burkland)
- Fastest normally aspirated car in history (Broke 45-year-old record set by Summer's Bros. "Goldenrod" on Nov 12, 1965)
- First and only unblown single engine car over 400 MPH
- First and only car to ever set two over 300 MPH records in one day
- First and only car to ever hold all four of the fastest unblown records at Bonneville at the same time A/FS 379.6 MPH, A/GS 353.825 MPH, AA/GS 368.136 MPH, AA/FS 392.503 MPH
- First and only car to ever hold the two fastest unblown FIA records at the same time
- At the 2011 FIA Landspeed Shootout held in September, the “Spirit of Rett” increased its FIA Category A, Group II, Class 10 record to 366.59 MPH.

The only over 400 MPH records that have been set by conventional race cars are as follows (per Tom Burkland):

- Tom Burkland "Burklands 411" 417.020 MPH SCTA AA/BFS (two engines, blown, fuel, 4wd) Oct, 2004
- Charles Nearburg "Spirit of Rett" 414.316 MPH FIA (one engine, unblown, fuel, 2wd) Sept 21, 2010
- Nolan White "Spirit of Autopower" 413.156 MPH SCTA AA/BFS (blown, fuel) Aug, 2002
- Al Teague "Speed-O-Motive" 409.86 MPH FIA (one engine, blown, fuel, 2wd) Aug, 1991
- Bob Summers "Goldenrod" 409.277 MPH FIA (four engines, fuel, 4wd) Nov 12, 1965
- George Poteet "Speed Demon" 404.562 SCTA D/BFS (one engine, blown, fuel, 2wd) Aug 19, 2010
- Donald Campbell "Bluebird CN7" 403.10 FIA July, 1964
