= Oregon Trail =

Historic migration route spanning Independence, MO–Oregon City, OR

The Oregon Trail
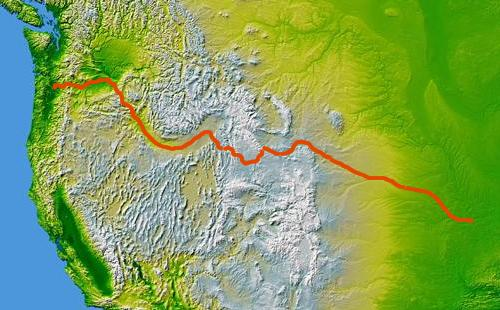
- The route of the Oregon Trail shown on a map of the western United States from Independence, Missouri (on the eastern end) to Oregon City, Oregon (on the western end)

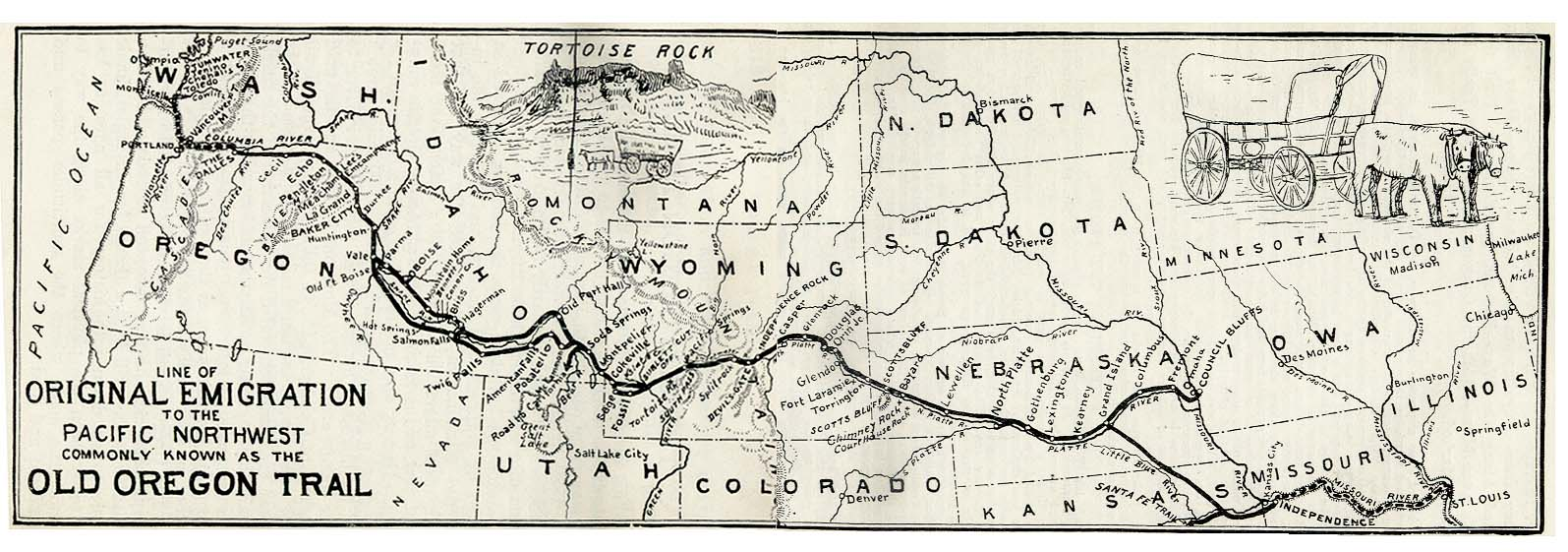
- A map from The Ox Team, or the Old Oregon Trail 1852–1906, by Ezra Meeker
- Location: Independence, MO–Oregon City, OR
- Established: 1830s by mountain men of fur trade, widely publicized by 1843
- Governing body: National Park Service
- Website: Oregon National Historic Trail

The Oregon Trail was a 2,170-mile (3,490 km) east–west, large-wheeled wagon route and emigrant trail in North America that connected the Missouri River to valleys in Oregon Territory. The eastern part of the Oregon Trail crossed what is now the states of Kansas, Nebraska, and Wyoming. The western half crossed the current states of Idaho and Oregon.

The Oregon Trail was laid by fur traders and trappers from about 1811 to 1840 and was initially only passable on foot or horseback. By 1836, when the first migrant wagon train was organized in Independence, Missouri, a wagon trail had been cleared to Fort Hall, Idaho. Wagon trails were cleared increasingly farther west and eventually reached the Willamette Valley in Oregon, at which point what came to be called the Oregon Trail was complete. Further improvements in the form of bridges, cutoffs, ferries, and roads made the trip faster and safer. From starting points in Iowa, Missouri, or Nebraska Territory, the routes converged along the lower Platte River Valley near Fort Kearny, Nebraska Territory. They led to fertile farmlands west of the Rocky Mountains.

The Oregon Trail and its many offshoots were used by about 400,000 settlers, farmers, miners, ranchers, and business owners and their families to get to the area known as Oregon and its surroundings, with traffic especially thick from 1846 to 1869. The eastern half of the trail was also used by travelers on the California Trail from 1843, the Mormon Trail from 1847, the Montana Trail from 1862, and the Bozeman Trail from 1863, before turning off to their separate destinations. Use of the trail declined after the first transcontinental railroad was completed in 1869, making the trip west substantially faster, cheaper, and safer. Since the mid-20th century, modern highways, such as Interstate 80 and Interstate 84, follow parts of the same course westward, and pass through towns originally established to serve those using the Oregon Trail.

== History ==
=== Lewis and Clark Expedition ===
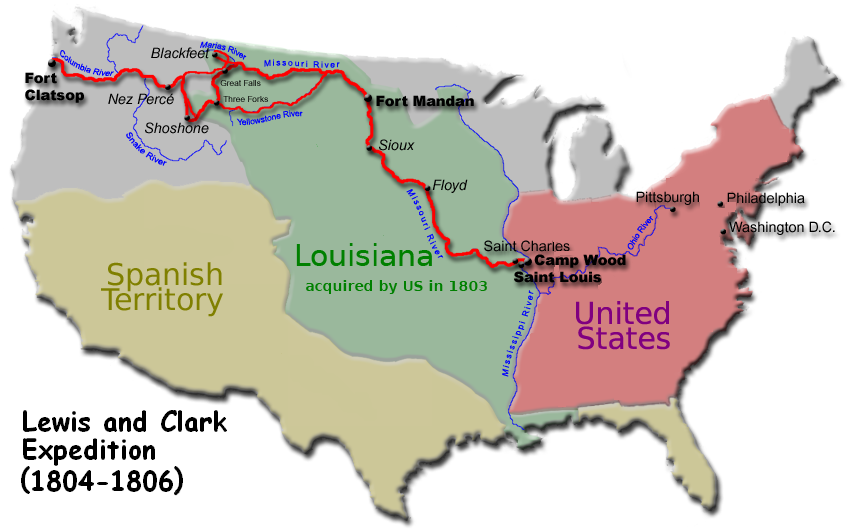
The route of the Lewis and Clark Expedition

The first land route across the present-day contiguous United States was mapped by the Lewis and Clark Expedition between 1804 and 1806, following these 1803 instructions from President Thomas Jefferson to Meriwether Lewis: "The object of your mission is to explore the Missouri river, and such principal stream of it, as, by its course and communication with the waters of the Pacific Ocean, whether the Columbia, Oregon, Colorado and/or other river may offer the most direct and practicable water communication across this continent, for commerce." Although Lewis and William Clark found a path to the Pacific Ocean, it was neither direct nor practicable for prairie schooner wagons to pass through without considerable road work. The two passes they found going through the Rocky Mountains, Lemhi Pass, and Lolo Pass, turned out to be much too difficult.

On the return trip in 1806, they traveled from the Columbia River to the Snake River and the Clearwater River over the Lolo Pass again. They then traveled overland up the Blackfoot River and crossed the Continental Divide at Lewis and Clark Pass, as it would become known, and on to the head of the Missouri River. This was ultimately a shorter and faster route than the one they followed west. This route had the disadvantages of being much too rough for wagons and controlled by the Blackfoot tribes.

Though Lewis and Clark had traveled only a narrow portion of the upper Missouri River drainage basin and part of the Columbia River drainage basin, insufficient contemporary knowledge of the Colorado River (Note: See Buenaventura River (legend).) had led to the conclusion that the Missouri and the Columbia drained most of the Rocky Mountains. The Lewis and Clark expedition dashed Jefferson's hopes of an "easy" route to a "Great River of the West" through the northern Rocky Mountains. Nonetheless, this famous expedition mapped both the eastern and western river valleys (Platte and Snake Rivers) that bookend the route of the Oregon Trail (and other emigrant trails) across the continental divide—they just had not located the South Pass or some of the interconnecting valleys later used in the high country. They showed the way for the mountain men, who within a decade found a better way across, even if it was not an easy way.

=== Pacific Fur Company ===
The Pacific Fur Company (PFC), founded in 1810 by John Jacob Astor as a subsidiary of his American Fur Company (AFC), operated in the Pacific Northwest in the North American fur trade. Two movements of PFC employees were planned by Astor: one sent to the Columbia River aboard the merchant ship Tonquin, the other dispatched overland under an expedition led by Wilson Price Hunt. Hunt and his party were to find possible supply routes and trapping territories for further fur trading posts. Upon arriving at the river in March 1811, the Tonquin crew began building what became Fort Astoria. The ship left supplies and men to continue work on the station and ventured north up the coast to Clayoquot Sound for a trading expedition. While anchored there, Jonathan Thorn insulted an elder Tla-o-qui-aht who was previously elected by the natives to negotiate a mutually satisfactory price for animal pelts. Soon after, the vessel was attacked and overwhelmed by the indigenous Clayoquot, killing many of the crew. Its Quinault interpreter survived and later told the PFC management at Fort Astoria of the destruction. The next day, the ship was blown up by surviving crew members.

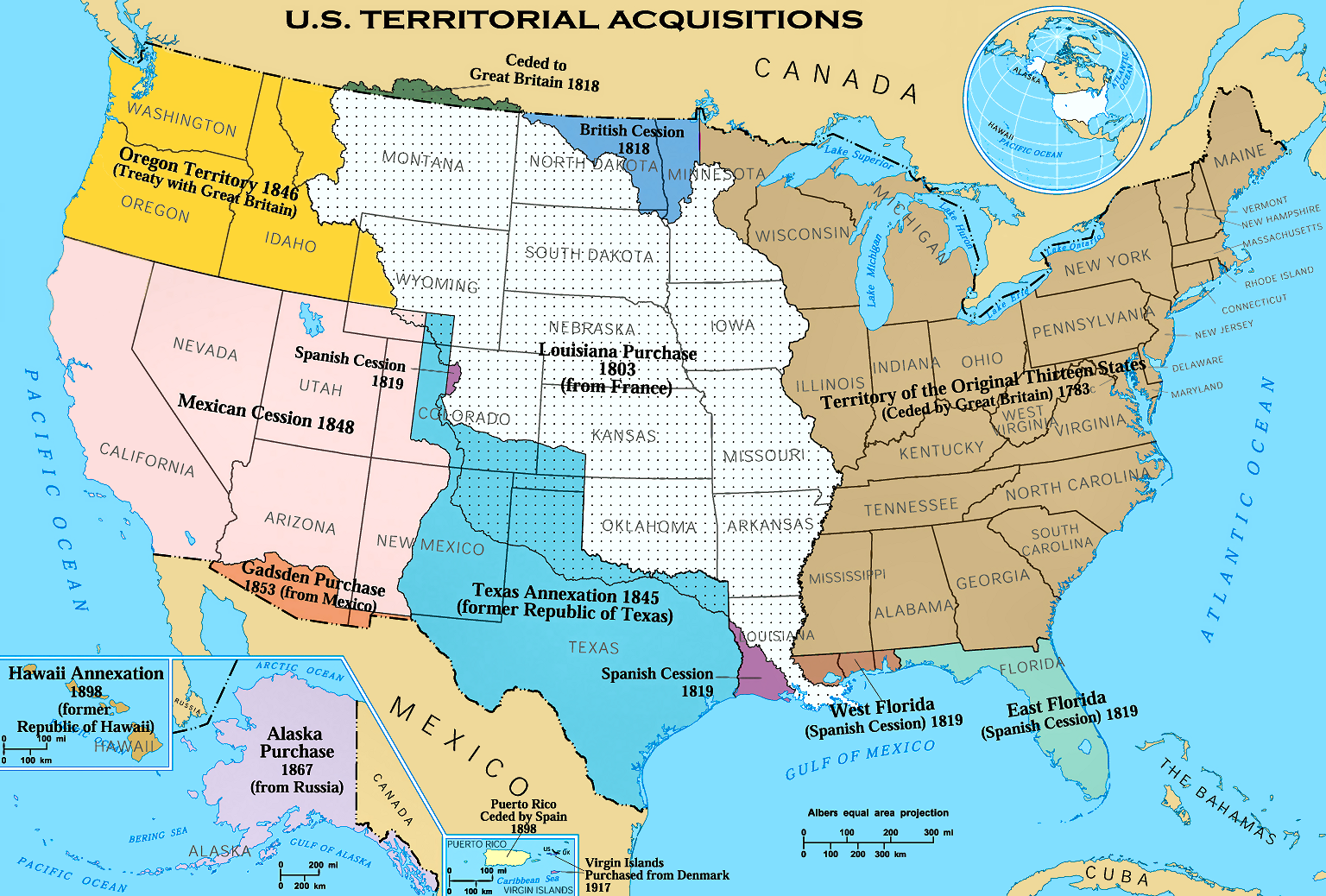
U.S. territorial acquisitions–portions of each territory were granted statehood since the 18th century.

Under Hunt, fearing attack by the Niitsitapi, the overland expedition veered south of Lewis and Clark's route into what is now Wyoming and in the process passed across Union Pass and into Jackson Hole, Wyoming. From there they went over the Teton Range via Teton Pass and then down to the Snake River into modern Idaho. They abandoned their horses at the Snake River, made dugout canoes, and attempted to use the river for transport. After a few days' travel, they soon discovered that steep canyons, waterfalls, and impassable rapids made travel by river impossible. Too far from their horses to retrieve them, they had to cache most of their goods and walk the rest of the way to the Columbia River where they made new boats and traveled to the newly established Fort Astoria. The expedition demonstrated that much of the route along the Snake River plain and across to the Columbia was passable by pack train or with minimal improvements, even wagons. This knowledge would be incorporated into the concatenated trail segments as the Oregon Trail took its early shape.

Pacific Fur Company partner Robert Stuart led a small group of men back east to report to Astor. The group planned to retrace the path followed by the overland expedition back up to the east following the Columbia and Snake Rivers. Fear of a Native American attack near Union Pass in Wyoming forced the group further south where they discovered South Pass, a wide and easy pass over the Continental Divide. The party continued east via the Sweetwater River, North Platte River (where they spent the winter of 1812–13), and Platte River to the Missouri River, finally arriving in St. Louis in the spring of 1813. The route they had used appeared to potentially be a practical wagon route, requiring minimal improvements, and Stuart's journals provided a meticulous account of most of the route. Because of the War of 1812 and the lack of U.S. fur trading posts in the Pacific Northwest, most of the route was unused for more than 10 years.

=== North West Company and Hudson's Bay Company ===
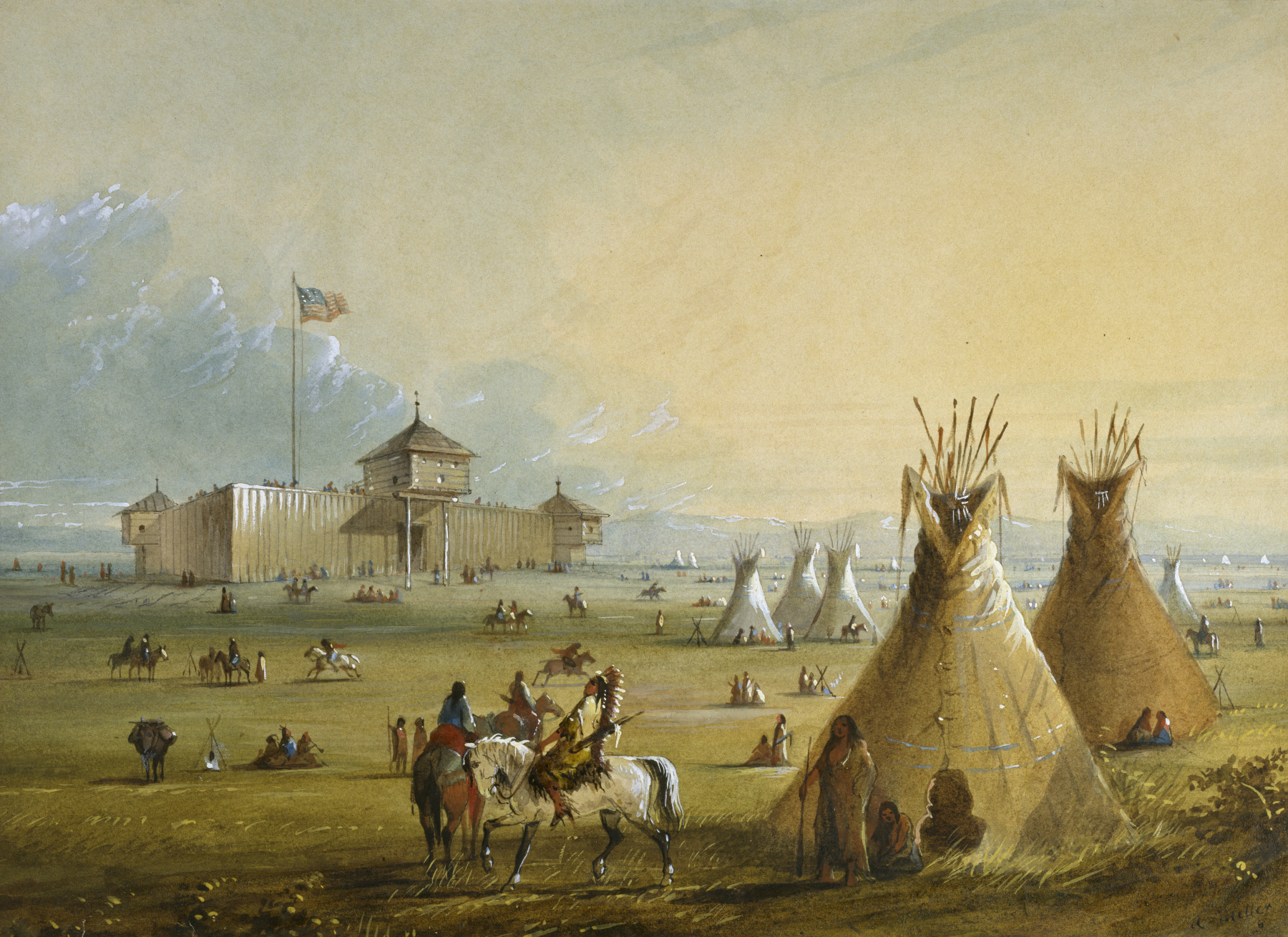
The first Fort Laramie as it looked prior to 1840. Painting from memory by Alfred Jacob Miller

In August 1811, three months after Fort Astoria was established, David Thompson and his team of North West Company explorers came floating down the Columbia to Fort Astoria. He had just completed a journey through much of western Canada and most of the Columbia River drainage system. He was mapping the country for possible fur trading posts. Along the way, he camped at the confluence of the Columbia and Snake Rivers and posted a notice claiming the land for Britain and stating the intention of the North West Company to build a fort on the site. When the War of 1812 broke out, the managers at Fort Astoria were concerned the British navy would seize their forts and supplies, and in 1813 they sold out to the North West Company.

By 1821, intense competition between the Hudson's Bay Company (HBC) and the North West Company reached the point of armed hostilities, and the British government pressured the two companies to merge. The newly reconfigured HBC had a near monopoly on trading (and most governing issues) in the Columbia District, or Oregon Country as it was referred to by the Americans, and also in Rupert's Land. That year the British parliament passed a statute applying the laws of Upper Canada to the district and giving the HBC power to enforce those laws.

From 1813 to the early 1840s the British, through the NWC and HBC, had nearly complete control of the Pacific Northwest and the western half of the Oregon Trail. In theory, the Treaty of Ghent, which ended the War of 1812, restored possession of U.S. property in Oregon territory to the United States. "Joint occupation" of the region was formally established by the Anglo-American Convention of 1818. The British, through the HBC, tried to discourage any U.S. trappers, traders, and settlers from work or settlement in the Pacific Northwest.

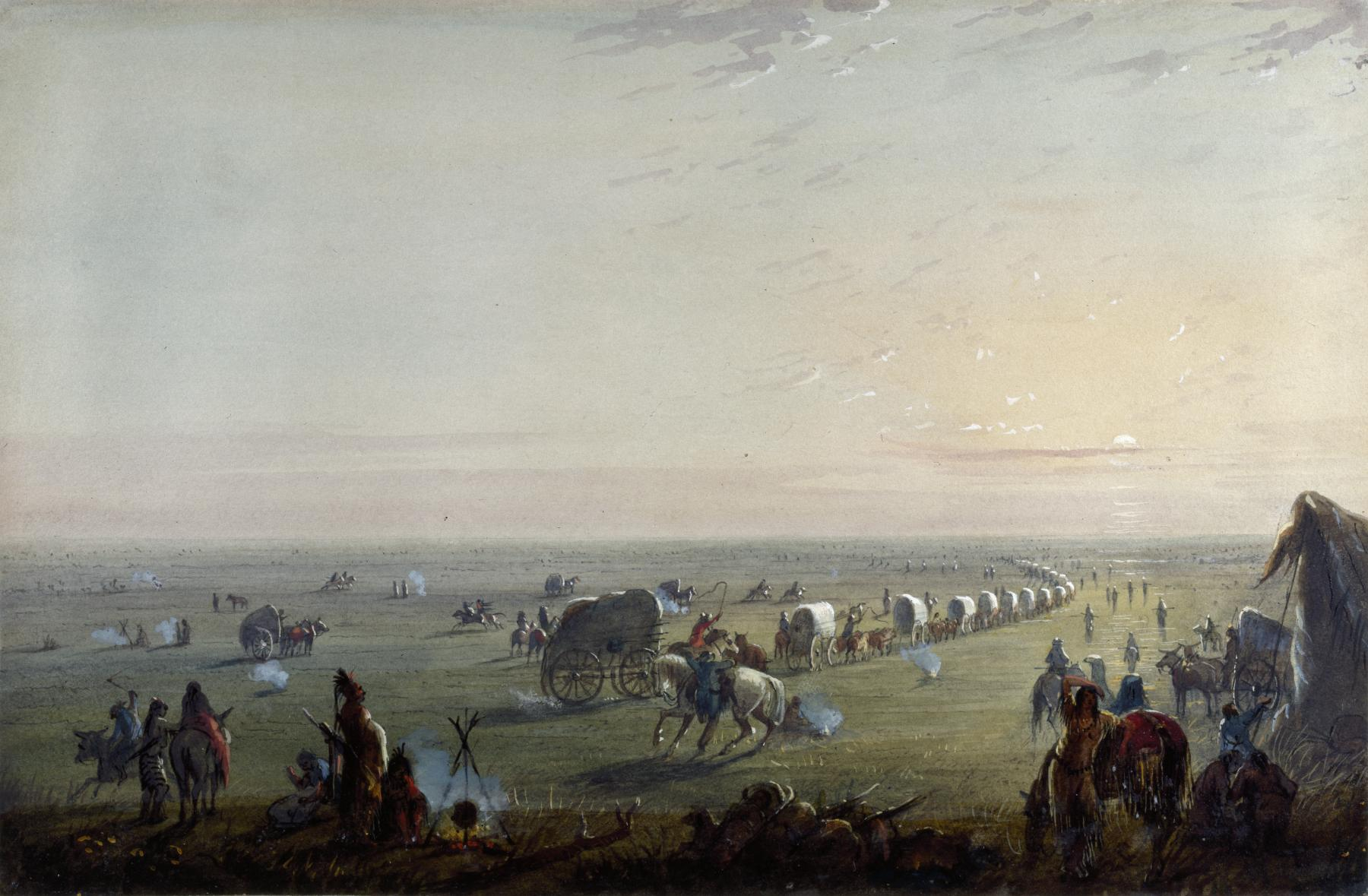
Breaking up Camp at Sunrise, by Alfred Jacob Miller

By overland travel, American missionaries and early settlers (initially mostly ex-trappers) started showing up in Oregon in the late 1820s. Although officially the HBC discouraged settlement because it interfered with its lucrative fur trade, its manager at Fort Vancouver, John McLoughlin, gave substantial help, including employment, until they could get established. In the early 1840s thousands of American settlers arrived and soon greatly outnumbered the British settlers in Oregon. McLoughlin, despite working for the HBC, gave help in the form of loans, medical care, shelter, clothing, food, supplies and seed to U.S. emigrants. These new emigrants often arrived in Oregon tired, worn out, nearly penniless, with insufficient food or supplies, just as winter was coming on. McLoughlin would later be hailed as the Father of Oregon.

The York Factory Express, establishing another route to the Oregon territory, evolved from an earlier express brigade used by the North West Company between Fort Astoria and Fort William, Ontario on Lake Superior. By 1825 the HBC started using two brigades, each setting out from opposite ends of the express route—one from Fort Vancouver on the Columbia River and the other from York Factory on Hudson Bay—in spring and passing each other in the middle of the continent. This established a "quick"— about 100 days for 2,600 miles (4,200 km) one way— to transport personnel and transmit messages between Fort Vancouver and York Factory on Hudson Bay.

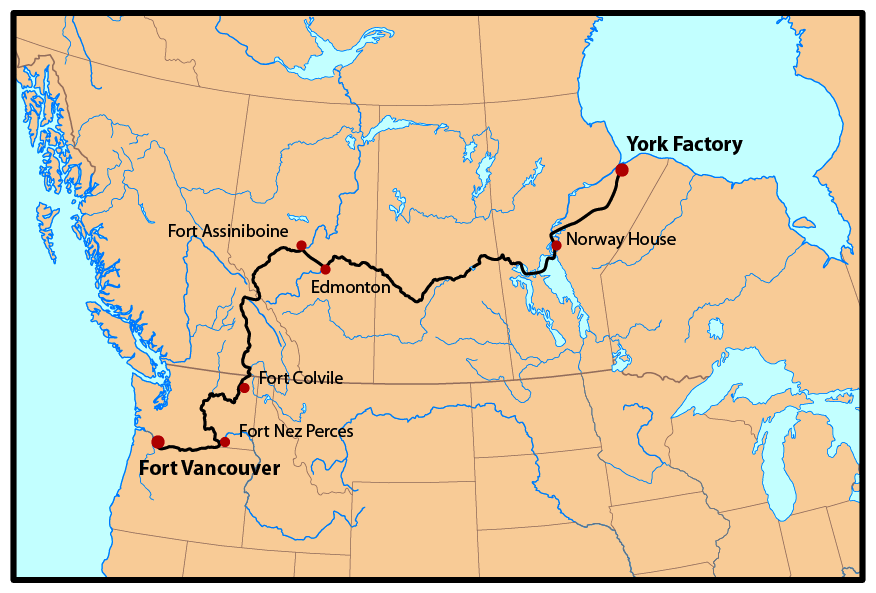
HBC's York Factory Express trade route, 1820s to 1840s. Modern political boundaries shown.

The HBC built a new much larger Fort Vancouver in 1825 about 90 miles upstream from Fort Astoria, on the north side of the Columbia River (they were hoping the Columbia would be the future Canada–U.S. border). The fort quickly became the center of activity in the Pacific Northwest. Every year ships would come from London to the Pacific (via Cape Horn) to drop off supplies and trade goods in its trading posts in the Pacific Northwest and pick up the accumulated furs used to pay for these supplies. It was the nexus for the fur trade on the Pacific Coast; its influence reached from the Rocky Mountains to the Hawaiian Islands, and from Russian Alaska into Mexican-controlled California. At its pinnacle in about 1840, the manager of Fort Vancouver watched over 34 outposts, 24 ports, 6 ships, and about 600 employees.

When American emigration over the Oregon Trail began in earnest in the early 1840s, for many settlers the fort became the last stop on the Oregon Trail where they could get supplies, aid, and help before starting their homesteads. Fort Vancouver was the main re-supply point for nearly all Oregon trail travelers until U.S. towns could be established. The HBC established Fort Colvile in 1825 on the Columbia River near Kettle Falls as a good site to collect furs and control the upper Columbia River fur trade. Fort Nisqually was built near the present town of DuPont, Washington, and was the first HBC fort on Puget Sound. Fort Victoria was erected in 1843 and became the headquarters of operations in British Columbia, eventually growing into modern-day Victoria, the capital city of British Columbia.

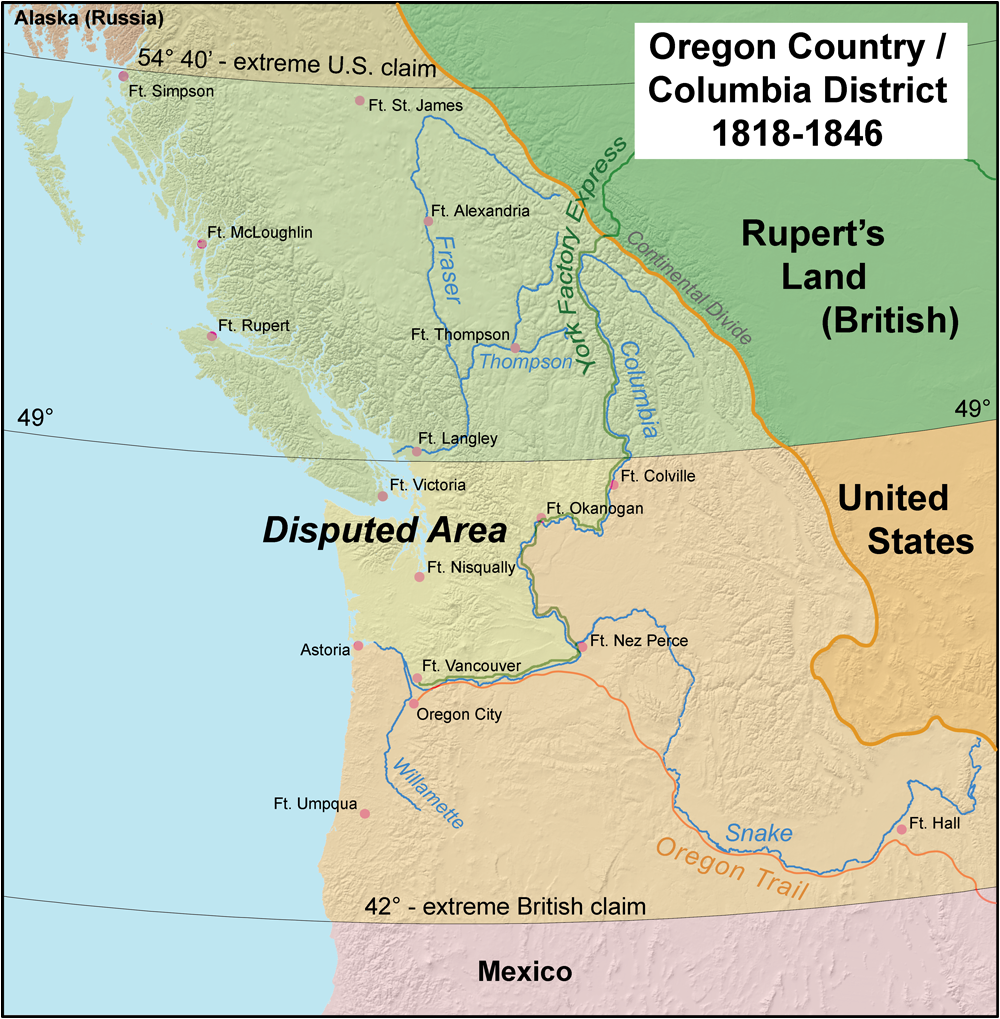
The Oregon Country/Columbia District stretched from 42'N to 54 40'N. The most heavily disputed portion is highlighted.

By 1840, the HBC had three forts: Fort Hall (purchased from Nathaniel Jarvis Wyeth in 1837), Fort Boise and Fort Nez Perce on the western end of the Oregon Trail route as well as Fort Vancouver near its terminus in the Willamette Valley. With minor exceptions, they all gave substantial and often desperately needed aid to the early Oregon Trail pioneers.

When the fur trade slowed in the 1840s because of fashion changes in men's hats, the value of the Pacific Northwest to the British was seriously diminished. Canada had few potential settlers who were willing to move more than 2,500 miles (4,000 km) to the Pacific Northwest, although several hundred ex-trappers, British and American, and their families did start settling in what became Oregon and Washington. In 1841, James Sinclair, on orders from HBC Governor Sir George Simpson, guided nearly 200 settlers from the Red River Colony (located at the junction of the Assiniboine River and Red River near present Winnipeg, Manitoba, Canada) into the Oregon territory. This attempt at settlement failed when most of the families joined the settlers in the Willamette Valley, with their promise of free land and HBC-free government.

In 1846, the Oregon Treaty ending the Oregon boundary dispute was signed with Britain. The British lost much of the land they had so long controlled. The new Canada–United States border was established at the 49th parallel to the Pacific Coast, then dipping south around Vancouver Island. The treaty granted the HBC navigation rights on the Columbia River for supplying their fur posts, clear titles to their trading post properties allowing them to be sold later if they wanted, and left the British with a good anchorage at Victoria. It gave the United States most of what it wanted, a "reasonable" boundary and a good anchorage on the West Coast in Puget Sound. While there were few United States settlers in the future state of Washington in 1846, the United States had already demonstrated it could induce thousands of settlers to go to the Oregon Territory, and it would be only a short time before they would vastly outnumber the few hundred HBC employees and retirees living in the region.

=== Great American Desert ===
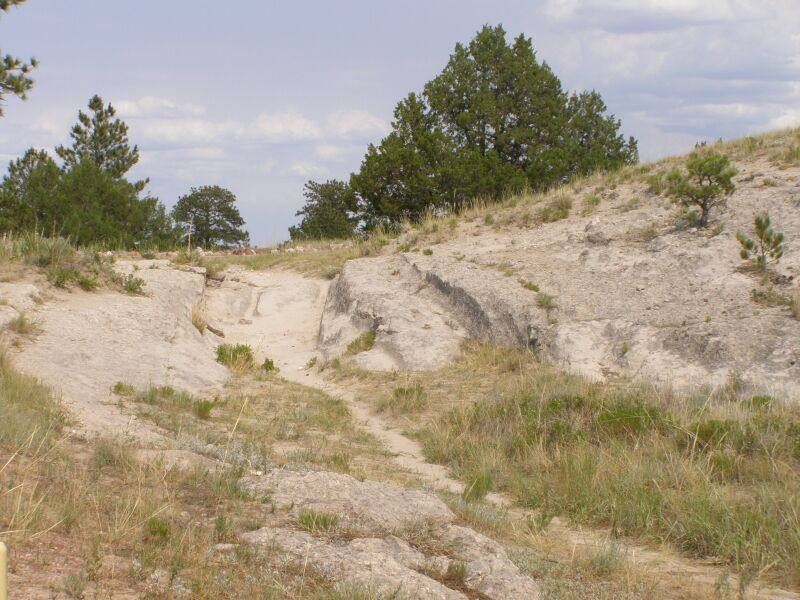
Trail ruts near Guernsey, Wyoming

Reports from expeditions in 1806 by Lieutenant Zebulon Pike and in 1819 by Major Stephen Long described the Great Plains as "unfit for human habitation" and as "The Great American Desert". These descriptions were mainly based on the relative lack of timber and surface water. The images of sandy wastelands conjured up by terms like "desert" were tempered by the many reports of vast herds of millions of Plains Bison that somehow managed to live in this "desert". In the 1840s, the Great Plains appeared to be unattractive for settlement and were illegal for homesteading until well after 1846—initially, it was set aside by the U.S. government for Native American settlements. The next available land for general settlement, Oregon, appeared to be free for the taking and had fertile lands, disease-free climate (yellow fever and malaria were then prevalent in much of the Missouri and Mississippi River drainage), extensive forests, big rivers, potential seaports, and only a few nominally British settlers.

=== Fur traders, trappers, and explorers ===
Fur trappers, often working for fur traders, followed nearly all possible streams looking for beaver in the years (1812–1840) when the fur trade was active. Fur traders included Manuel Lisa, Robert Stuart, William Henry Ashley, Jedediah Smith, William Sublette, Andrew Henry, Thomas Fitzpatrick, Kit Carson, Jim Bridger, Peter Skene Ogden, David Thompson, James Douglas, Donald Mackenzie, Alexander Ross, James Sinclair, and other mountain men. Besides describing and naming many of the rivers and mountains in the Intermountain West and Pacific Northwest, they often kept diaries of their travels and were available as guides and consultants when the trail started to become open for general travel. The fur trade business wound down to a very low level just as the Oregon trail traffic seriously began around 1840.

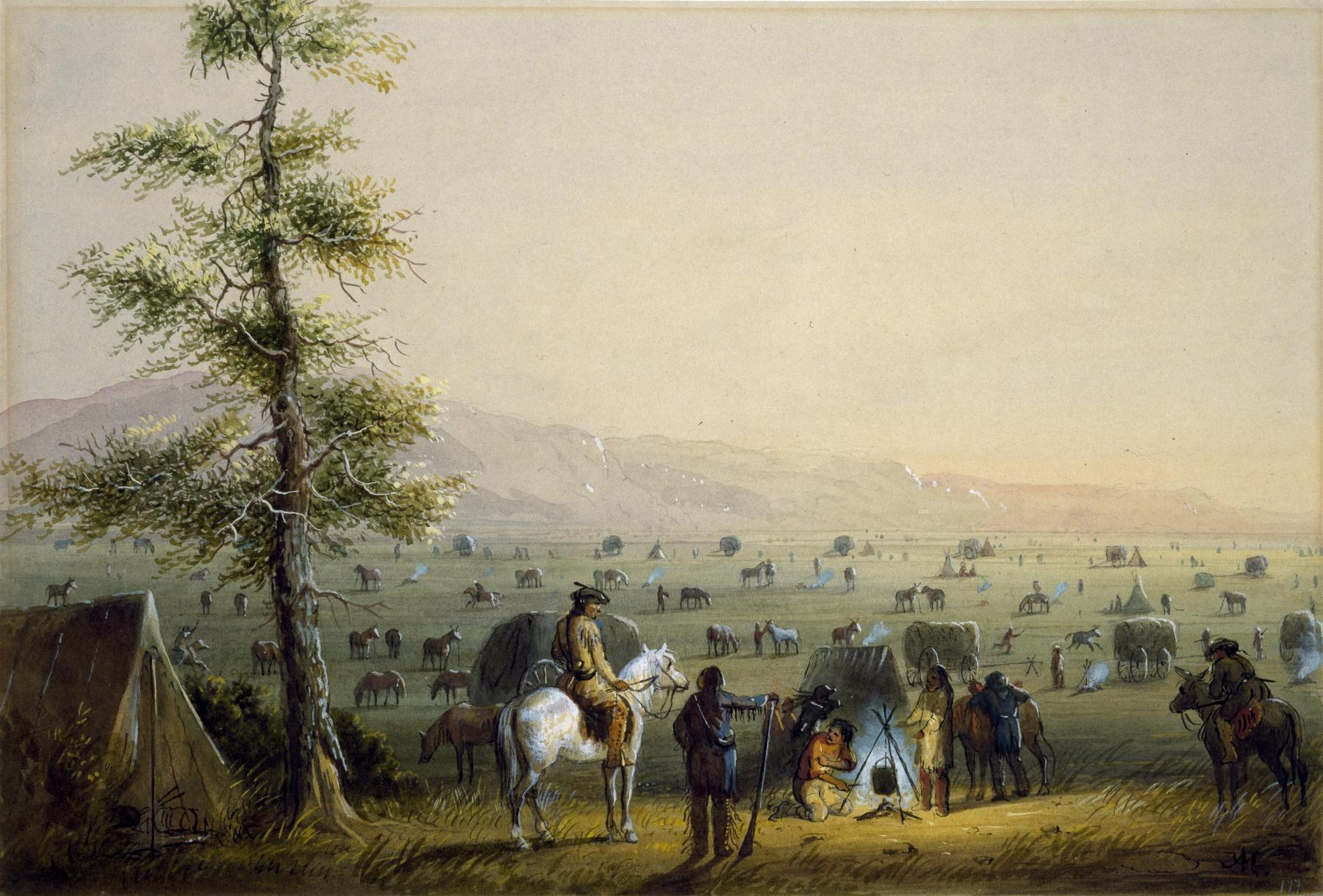
Our Camp, by Alfred Jacob Miller

In the fall of 1823, Jedediah Smith and Thomas Fitzpatrick led their trapping crew south from the Yellowstone River to the Sweetwater River. They were looking for a safe location to spend the winter. Smith reasoned since the Sweetwater flowed east it must eventually run into the Missouri River. Trying to transport their extensive fur collection down the Sweetwater and North Platte Rivers, they found after a near-disastrous canoe crash that the rivers were too swift and rough for water passage. On July 4, 1824, they cached their furs under a dome of rock they named Independence Rock and started their long trek on foot to the Missouri River. Upon arriving back in a settled area they bought pack horses (on credit) and retrieved their furs. They had discovered the route that Robert Stuart had taken in 1813—eleven years before. Thomas Fitzpatrick was often hired as a guide when the fur trade dwindled in 1840. Smith was killed by Comanche natives around 1831.

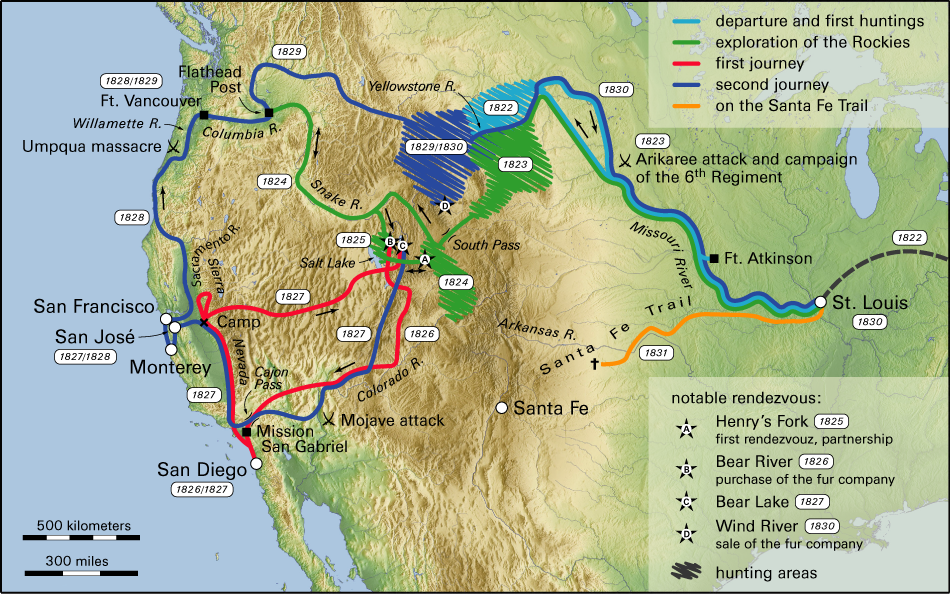
The exploration of the West by Jedediah Smith

Up to 3,000 mountain men were trappers and explorers, employed by various British and United States fur companies or working as free trappers, who roamed the North American Rocky Mountains from about 1810 to the early 1840s. They usually traveled in small groups for mutual support and protection. Trapping took place in the fall when the fur became prime. Mountain men primarily trapped beaver and sold the skins. A good beaver skin could bring up to $4 at a time when a man's wage was often $1 per day. Some were more interested in exploring the West. In 1825, the first significant American Rendezvous occurred on the Henry's Fork of the Green River. The trading supplies were brought in by a large party using pack trains originating on the Missouri River. These pack trains were then used to haul out the fur bales. They normally used the north side of the Platte River—the same route used 20 years later by the Mormon Trail. For the next 15 years, the American rendezvous was an annual event moving to different locations, usually somewhere on the Green River in the future state of Wyoming. Each rendezvous, occurring during the slack summer period, allowed the fur traders to trade for and collect the furs from the trappers and their Native American allies without having the expense of building or maintaining a fort or wintering over in the cold Rockies. In only a few weeks at a rendezvous a year's worth of trading and celebrating would take place as the traders took their furs and remaining supplies back east for the winter and the trappers faced another fall and winter with new supplies. Trapper Jim Beckwourth described the scene as one of "Mirth, songs, dancing, shouting, trading, running, jumping, singing, racing, target-shooting, yarns, frolic, with all sorts of extravagances that white men or Indians could invent." In 1830, William Sublette brought the first wagons carrying his trading goods up the Platte, North Platte, and Sweetwater rivers before crossing over South Pass to a fur trade rendezvous on the Green River near the future town of Big Piney, Wyoming. He had a crew that dug out the gullies and river crossings and cleared the brush where needed. This established that the eastern part of most of the Oregon Trail was passable by wagons. In the late 1830s, the HBC instituted a policy intended to destroy or weaken the American fur trade companies. The HBC's annual collection and re-supply Snake River Expedition was transformed into a trading enterprise. Beginning in 1834, it visited the American Rendezvous to undersell the American traders—losing money but undercutting the American fur traders. By 1840, the fashion in Europe and Britain shifted away from the formerly very popular beaver felt hats and prices for furs rapidly declined and the trapping almost ceased.

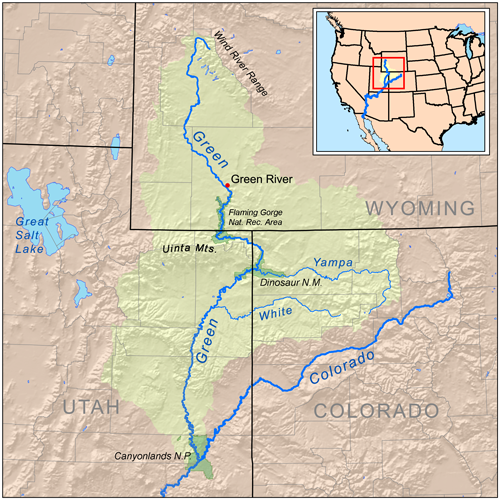
Map of the Green River watershed

Fur traders tried to use the Platte River, the main route of the eastern Oregon Trail, for transport but soon gave up in frustration as its many channels and islands combined with its muddy waters were too shallow, crooked, and unpredictable to use for water transport. The Platte proved to be unnavigable. The Platte River and North Platte River Valley, however, became an easy roadway for wagons, with its nearly flat plain sloping easily up and heading almost due west.

Several U.S. government-sponsored explorers explored part of the Oregon Trail and wrote extensively about their explorations. Captain Benjamin Bonneville on his expedition of 1832 to 1834 explored much of the Oregon trail and brought wagons up the Platte, North Platte, Sweetwater route across South Pass to the Green River in Wyoming. He explored most of Idaho and the Oregon Trail to the Columbia. The account of his explorations in the West was published by Washington Irving in 1838. John C. Frémont of the U.S. Army's Corps of Topographical Engineers and his guide Kit Carson led three expeditions from 1842 to 1846 over parts of California and Oregon. His explorations were written up by him and his wife Jessie Benton Frémont and were widely published. The first detailed maps of California and Oregon were drawn by Frémont and his topographers and cartographers in about 1848.

=== Missionaries ===
In 1834, The Dalles Methodist Mission was founded by Reverend Jason Lee just east of Mount Hood on the Columbia River. In 1836, Henry H. Spalding and Marcus Whitman traveled west to establish the Whitman Mission near modern-day Walla Walla, Washington. The party included the wives of the two men, Narcissa Whitman and Eliza Hart Spalding, who became the first European-American women to cross the Rocky Mountains. En route, the party accompanied American fur traders going to the 1836 rendezvous on the Green River in Wyoming and then joined Hudson's Bay Company fur traders traveling west to Fort Nez Perce (also called Fort Walla Walla). The group was the first to travel in wagons to Fort Hall, where the wagons were abandoned at the urging of their guides. They used pack animals for the rest of the trip to Fort Walla Walla and then floated by boat to Fort Vancouver to get supplies before returning to start their missions. Other missionaries, mostly husband and wife teams using wagon and pack trains, established missions in the Willamette Valley, as well as various locations in the future states of Washington, Oregon, and Idaho.

=== Early emigrants ===
On May 1, 1839, a group of eighteen men from Peoria, Illinois, set out with the intention of colonizing the Oregon country on behalf of the United States of America and driving out the HBC operating there. The men of the Peoria Party were among the first pioneers to traverse most of the Oregon Trail. They were initially led by Thomas J. Farnham and called themselves the Oregon Dragoons. They carried a large flag emblazoned with their motto "Oregon Or The Grave". Although the group split up near Bent's Fort on the South Platte and Farnham was deposed as leader, nine of their members eventually did reach Oregon.

In September 1840, Robert Newell, Joseph L. Meek, and their families reached Fort Walla Walla with three wagons that they had driven from Fort Hall. Their wagons were the first to reach the Columbia River over land, and they opened the final leg of the Oregon Trail to wagon traffic.

In 1841, the Bartleson-Bidwell Party was the first emigrant group credited with using the Oregon Trail to emigrate west. The group set out for California, but about half the party left the original group at Soda Springs, Idaho, and proceeded to the Willamette Valley in Oregon, leaving their wagons at Fort Hall.

On May 16, 1842, the second organized wagon train set out from Elm Grove, Missouri, with more than 100 pioneers. The party was led by Elijah White. The group broke up after passing Fort Hall with most of the single men hurrying ahead and the families following later.

=== Great Migration of 1843 ===
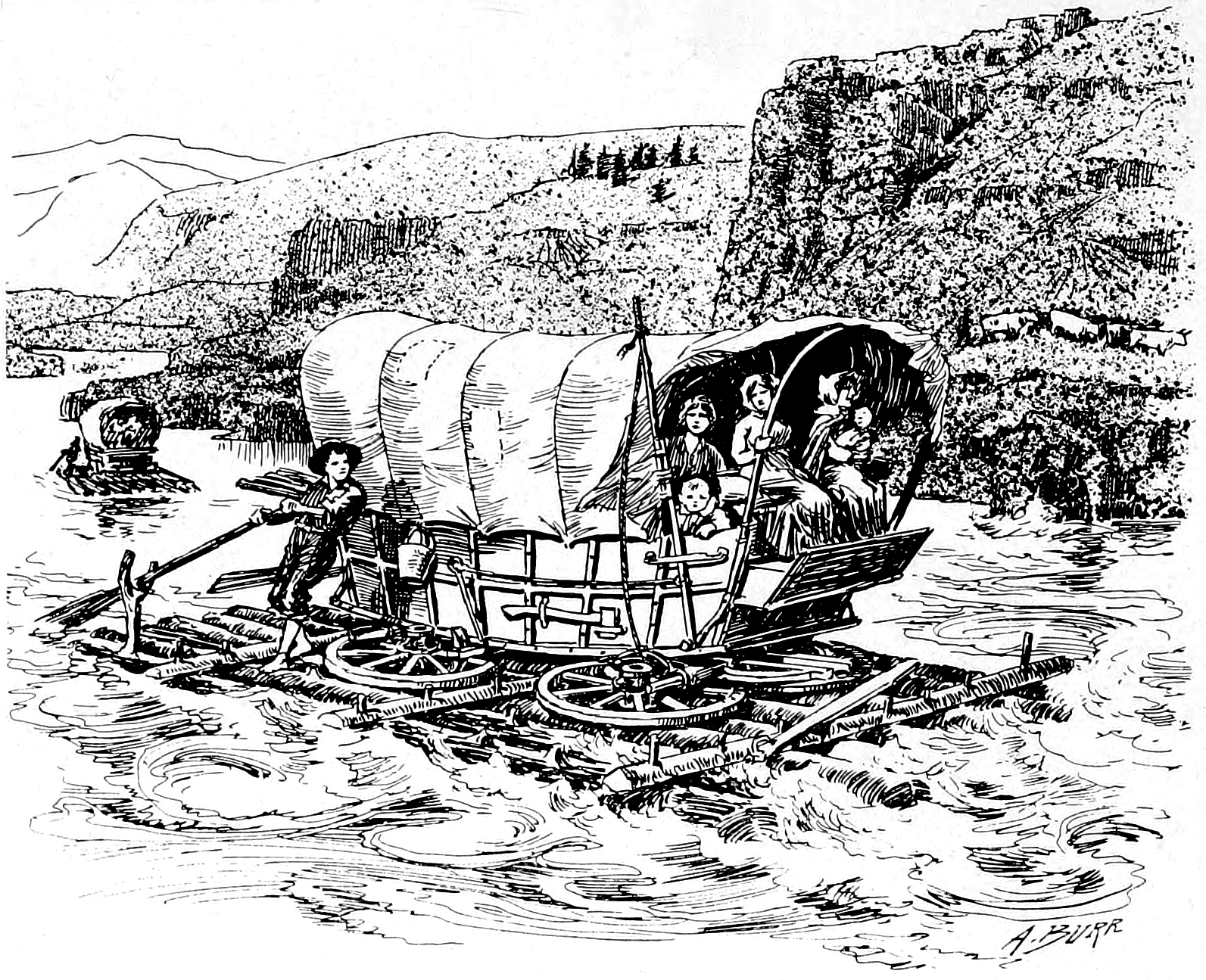
A wagon lashed to a raft for the last stage of the emigration.

In what was dubbed "The Great Migration of 1843" or the "Wagon Train of 1843", an estimated 700 to 1,000 emigrants left for Oregon. They were led initially by John Gantt, a former U.S. Army captain and fur trader who was contracted to guide the train to Fort Hall for $1 per person. The winter before, Marcus Whitman had made a brutal midwinter trip from Oregon to St. Louis to appeal a decision by his mission backers to abandon several of the Oregon missions. He joined the wagon train at the Platte River for the return trip. When the pioneers were told at Fort Hall by agents from the Hudson's Bay Company that they should abandon their wagons there and use pack animals the rest of the way, Whitman disagreed and volunteered to lead the wagons to Oregon. He believed the wagon trains were large enough that they could build whatever road improvements they needed to make the trip with their wagons. The biggest obstacle they faced was in the Blue Mountains of Oregon, where they had to cut and clear a trail through heavy timber. The wagons were stopped at The Dalles, Oregon, by the lack of a road around Mount Hood. The wagons had to be disassembled and floated down the treacherous Columbia River and the animals herded over the rough Lolo trail to get by Mount Hood. Nearly all of the settlers in the 1843 wagon trains arrived in the Willamette Valley by early October. A passable wagon trail now existed from the Missouri River to The Dalles. Jesse Applegate's account of the emigration, "A Day with the Cow Column in 1843", has been described as "the best bit of literature left to us by any participant in the [Oregon] pioneer movement..." and has been republished several times from 1868 to 1990.

In 1846, the Barlow Road was completed around Mount Hood, providing a rough but completely passable wagon trail from the Missouri River to the Willamette Valley, about 2,000 miles (3,200 km).

=== Oregon Country ===
In 1843, settlers of the Willamette Valley drafted the Organic Laws of Oregon organizing land claims within the Oregon Country. Married couples were granted at no cost (except for the requirement to work and improve the land) up to 640 acres (2.6 km^{2}) (a section or square mile), and unmarried settlers could claim 320 acres (1.3 km^{2}). As the group was a provisional government with no authority, these claims were not valid under United States or British law, but they were eventually honored by the United States in the Donation Land Act of 1850. The Donation Land Act provided for married settlers to be granted 320 acres (1.3 km^{2}) and unmarried settlers 160 acres (0.65 km^{2}). Following the expiration of the act in 1854 the land was no longer free but cost $1.25 per acre ($3.09/hectare) with a limit of 320 acres (1.3 km^{2})—the same as most other unimproved government land.

=== Women on the Overland Trail ===
Consensus interpretations, as found in John Faragher's book, Women and Men on the Overland Trail (1979), held that men's and women's power within marriage was uneven. This meant that women did not experience the trail as liberating, but instead only found harder work than they had handled back east, all the while upholding the virtues of the Culture of Domesticity. Some of the additional tasks women had on the wagon trail included collecting "buffalo chips" for fire fuel, unloading and loading up the wagons, driving teams of oxen, pouring bullets to help in Indian attacks, and striving to keep their men and children at peace. They were the backbones of life on the wagon trail and took up not only their regular duties but many duties of men as well. However, feminist scholarship, by historians such as Lillian Schlissel, Sandra Myres, and Glenda Riley, suggests men and women did not view the West and western migration in the same way. Whereas men might deem the dangers of the trial acceptable if there was a strong economic reward at the end, women viewed those dangers as threatening to the stability and survival of the family. Once they arrived at their new Western home, women's public role in building Western communities and participating in the Western economy gave them a greater authority than they had known back East. There was a "female frontier" that was distinct and different from that experienced by men.

Women's diaries kept during their travels or the letters they wrote home once they arrived at their destination support these contentions. Women wrote with sadness and concern about the numerous deaths along the trail. Anna Maria King wrote to her family in 1845 about her trip to the Luckiamute Valley Oregon and of the multiple deaths experienced by her traveling group:

But listen to the deaths: Sally Chambers, John King, and his wife, their little daughter Electa and their babe, a son 9 months old, and Dulancy C. Norton's sister are gone. Mr. A. Fuller lost his wife and daughter Tabitha. Eight of our two families have gone to their long home.

Similarly, emigrant Martha Gay Masterson, who traveled the trail with her family at the age of 13, mentioned the fascination she and other children felt for the graves and loose skulls they would find near their camps.

Anna Maria King, like many other women, also advised family and friends back home of the realities of the trip and offered advice on how to prepare for the trip. Women also reacted and responded, often enthusiastically, to the landscape of the West. Betsey Bayley, in a letter to her sister, Lucy P. Griffith, described how travelers responded to the new environment they encountered:

The mountains looked like volcanoes and the appearance that one day there had been an awful thundering of volcanoes and a burning world. The valleys were all covered with a white crust and looked like salaratus. Some of the companies used it to raise their bread.

While women experienced many deaths and hardships on the trail, the trail was also a place for women to take on roles they had previously not been allowed to take on back east. Women started to use their journals on the trails to express themselves as "reporters, guides, poets, and historians." They would jot down botany and different species on the trail to help feed their family. Women used their resourcefulness and creativity on the trail.

=== Mormon emigration ===
Following persecution and mob action in Missouri, Illinois, and other states, and the assassination of their prophet Joseph Smith in 1844, Mormon leader Brigham Young led settlers in the Latter Day Saints (LDS) church west to the Salt Lake Valley in present-day Utah. In 1847 Young led a small, fast-moving group from their Winter Quarters encampments near Omaha, Nebraska, and their approximately 50 temporary settlements on the Missouri River in Iowa including Council Bluffs. About 2,200 LDS pioneers went that first year; they were charged with establishing farms, growing crops, building fences and herds, and establishing preliminary settlements to feed and support the many thousands of emigrants expected in the coming years. After ferrying across the Missouri River and establishing wagon trains near what became Omaha, the Mormons followed the northern bank of the Platte River in Nebraska to Fort Laramie in present-day Wyoming. They initially started in 1848 with trains of several thousand emigrants, which were rapidly split into smaller groups to be more easily accommodated at the limited springs and acceptable camping places on the trail. The much larger presence of women and children meant these wagon trains did not try to cover as much ground in a single day as Oregon and California-bound emigrants, typically taking about 100 days to cover the 1,000 miles (1,600 km) trip to Salt Lake City. (The Oregon and California emigrants averaged about 15 miles (24 km) per day.) In Wyoming, the Mormon emigrants followed the main Oregon/California/Mormon Trail through Wyoming to Fort Bridger, where they split from the main trail and followed (and improved) the rough path known as Hastings Cutoff, used by the ill-fated Donner Party in 1846.

Between 1847 and 1860, over 43,000 Mormon settlers and tens of thousands of travelers on the California Trail and Oregon Trail followed Young to Utah. After 1848, the travelers headed to California or Oregon resupplied at the Salt Lake Valley, and then went back over the Salt Lake Cutoff, rejoining the trail near the future Idaho–Utah border at the City of Rocks in Idaho.

Along the Mormon Trail, the Mormon pioneers established several ferries and made trail improvements to help later travelers and earn much-needed money. One of the better-known ferries was the Mormon Ferry across the North Platte near the future site of Fort Caspar in Wyoming which operated between 1848 and 1852 and the Green River ferry near Fort Bridger which operated from 1847 to 1856. The ferries were free for Mormon settlers while all others were charged a toll ranging from $3 to $8.

=== California gold rush ===
In January 1848, James Marshall found gold in the Sierra Nevada portion of the American River, sparking the California gold rush. It is estimated that about two-thirds of the male population in Oregon went to California in 1848 to cash in on the opportunity. To get there, they helped build the Lassen Branch of the Applegate-Lassen Trail by cutting a wagon road through extensive forests. Many returned with significant gold which helped jump-start the Oregon economy. Over the next decade, gold seekers from the Midwestern United States and East Coast of the United States dramatically increased traffic on the Oregon and California Trails. The "forty-niners" often chose speed over safety and opted to use shortcuts such as the Sublette-Greenwood Cutoff in Wyoming which reduced travel time by almost seven days but spanned nearly 45 miles (72 km) of the desert without water, grass, or fuel for fires. 1849 was the first year of large scale cholera epidemics in the United States, and thousands are thought to have died along the trail on their way to California—most buried in unmarked graves in Kansas and Nebraska. The adjusted 1850 U.S. census of California showed this rush was overwhelmingly male with about 112,000 males to 8,000 females (with about 5,500 women over age 15). Women were significantly underrepresented in the California gold rush, and sex ratios did not reach essential equality in California (and other western states) until about 1950. The relative scarcity of women gave them many opportunities to do many more things that were not normally considered women's work of this era. After 1849, the California gold rush continued for several years as the miners continued to find about $50,000,000 worth of gold per year at $21 per ounce. Once California was established as a prosperous state, many thousands more emigrated there each year for the opportunities.

=== Later emigration and uses of the trail ===
The trail was still in use during the Civil War, but traffic declined after 1855 when the Panama Railroad across the Isthmus of Panama was completed. Paddle wheel steamships and sailing ships, often heavily subsidized to carry the mail, provided rapid transport to and from the East Coast and New Orleans, Louisiana, to and from Panama to ports in California and Oregon.

Over the years many ferries were established to help get across the many rivers on the path of the Oregon Trail. Multiple ferries were established on the Missouri River, Kansas River, Little Blue River, Elkhorn River, Loup River, Platte River, South Platte River, North Platte River, Laramie River, Green River, Bear River, two crossings of the Snake River, John Day River, Deschutes River, Columbia River, as well as many other smaller streams. During peak immigration periods several ferries on any given river often competed for pioneer dollars. These ferries significantly increased speed and safety for Oregon Trail travelers. They increased the cost of traveling the trail by roughly $30 per wagon but decreased the time of transit from about 160 to 170 days in 1843 to 120 to 140 days in 1860. Ferries also helped prevent death by drowning at river crossings.

In April 1859, an expedition of U.S. Corps of Topographical Engineers led by Captain James H. Simpson left Camp Floyd, Utah, to establish an army supply route across the Great Basin to the eastern slope of the Sierras. Upon return in early August, Simpson reported that he had surveyed the Central Overland Route from Camp Floyd to Genoa, Nevada. This route went through central Nevada (roughly where U.S. Route 50 goes today) and was about 280 miles (450 km) shorter than the "standard" Humboldt River California trail route.

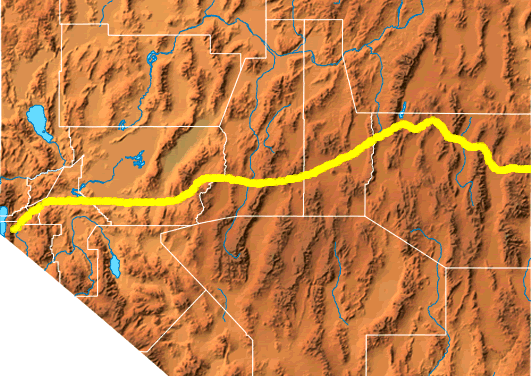
The Central Route in Nevada

The Army improved the trail for use by wagons and stagecoaches in 1859 and 1860. Starting in 1860, the American Civil War closed the heavily subsidized Butterfield Overland Mail stage Southern Route through the deserts of the American Southwest.

In 1860–1861, the Pony Express, employing riders traveling on horseback day and night with relay stations about every 10 miles (16 km) to supply fresh horses, was established from St. Joseph, Missouri, to Sacramento, California. The Pony Express built many of their eastern stations along the Oregon/California/Mormon/Bozeman Trails and many of their western stations along the very sparsely settled Central Overland Route across Utah and Nevada. The Pony Express delivered mail summer and winter in roughly 10 days from the midwest to California.

In 1861, John Butterfield, who since 1858 had been using the Butterfield Overland Mail, also switched to the Central Route to avoid traveling through hostile territories during the American Civil War. George Chorpenning immediately realized the value of this more direct route, and shifted his existing mail and passenger line along with their stations from the "Northern Route" (California Trail) along the Humboldt River. In the same year, the first transcontinental telegraph also laid its lines alongside the Central Overland Route. Several stage lines were set up carrying mail and passengers that traversed much of the route of the original Oregon Trail to Fort Bridger and from there over the Central Overland Route to California. By traveling day and night with many stations and changes of teams (and extensive mail subsidies), these stages could get passengers and mail from the Midwest to California in about 25 to 28 days. This combined stage and Pony Express stations along the Oregon Trail and Central Route across Utah and Nevada were joined by the first transcontinental telegraph stations and telegraph line, which followed much the same route in 1861 from Carson City, Nevada to Salt Lake City. The Pony Express folded in 1861 as they failed to receive an expected mail contract from the U.S. government and the telegraph filled the need for rapid east-west communication. This combination wagon/stagecoach/pony express/telegraph line route is labeled the Pony Express National Historic Trail on the National Trail Map. From Salt Lake City the telegraph line followed much of the Mormon/California/Oregon trails to Omaha, Nebraska.

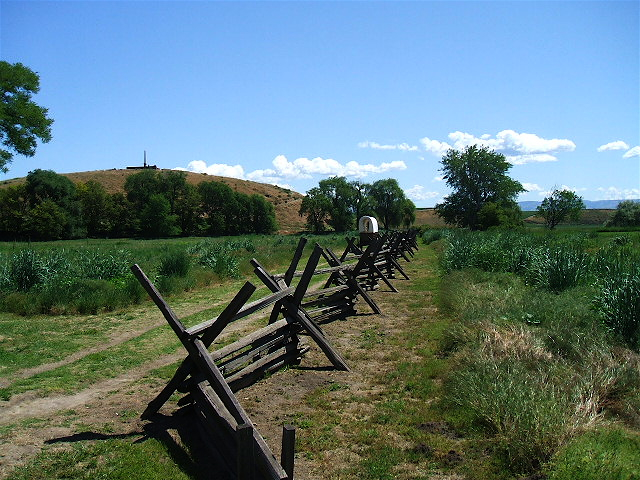
Covered wagon replica and Mission Monument at the Whitman Mission National Historic Site about ten miles west of Walla Walla, Washington

After the first transcontinental railroad was completed in 1869, telegraph lines usually followed the railroad tracks as the required relay stations and telegraph lines were much easier to maintain alongside the tracks. Telegraph lines to unpopulated areas were largely abandoned.

As the years passed, the Oregon Trail became a heavily used corridor from the Missouri River to the Columbia River. Offshoots of the trail continued to grow as gold and silver discoveries, farming, lumbering, ranching, and business opportunities resulted in much more traffic to many areas. Traffic became two-directional as towns were established along the trail. By 1870, the population in the states served by the Oregon Trail and its offshoots increased by about 350,000 over their 1860 census levels. Except for most of the 180,000 population increase in California, most of these people living away from the coast traveled over parts of the Oregon Trail and its many extensions and cutoffs to get to their new residences.

Even before the famous Texas cattle drives after the Civil War, the trail was being used to drive herds of thousands of cattle, horses, sheep, and goats from the Midwest to various towns and cities along the trails. According to studies by trail historian John Unruh the livestock may have been as plentiful or more plentiful than the immigrants in many years. In 1852, there were even records of a 1,500-turkey drive from Illinois to California. The main reason for this livestock traffic was the large cost discrepancy between livestock in the Midwest and at the end of the trail in California, Oregon, or Montana. They could often be bought in the Midwest for about a third to tenth of what they would fetch at the end of the trail. Large losses could occur and the drovers would still make significant profit. As the emigrant travel on the trail declined in later years and after livestock ranches were established at many places along the trail large herds of animals often were driven along part of the trail to get to and from markets.

=== Trail decline ===
The first transcontinental railroad was completed in 1869, providing faster, safer, and usually cheaper travel east and west (the journey took seven days and cost as little as $65, or equivalent to $1,655 in 2025). Some emigrants continued to use the trail well into the 1890s, and modern highways and railroads eventually paralleled large portions of the trail, including U.S. Highway 26, Interstate 84 in Oregon and Idaho and Interstate 80 in Nebraska. Contemporary interest in the overland trek has prompted the states and federal government to preserve landmarks on the trail including wagon ruts, buildings, and "registers" where emigrants carved their names. Throughout the 20th and 21st centuries, there have been several re-enactments of the trek with participants wearing period garments and traveling by wagon.

== Routes ==
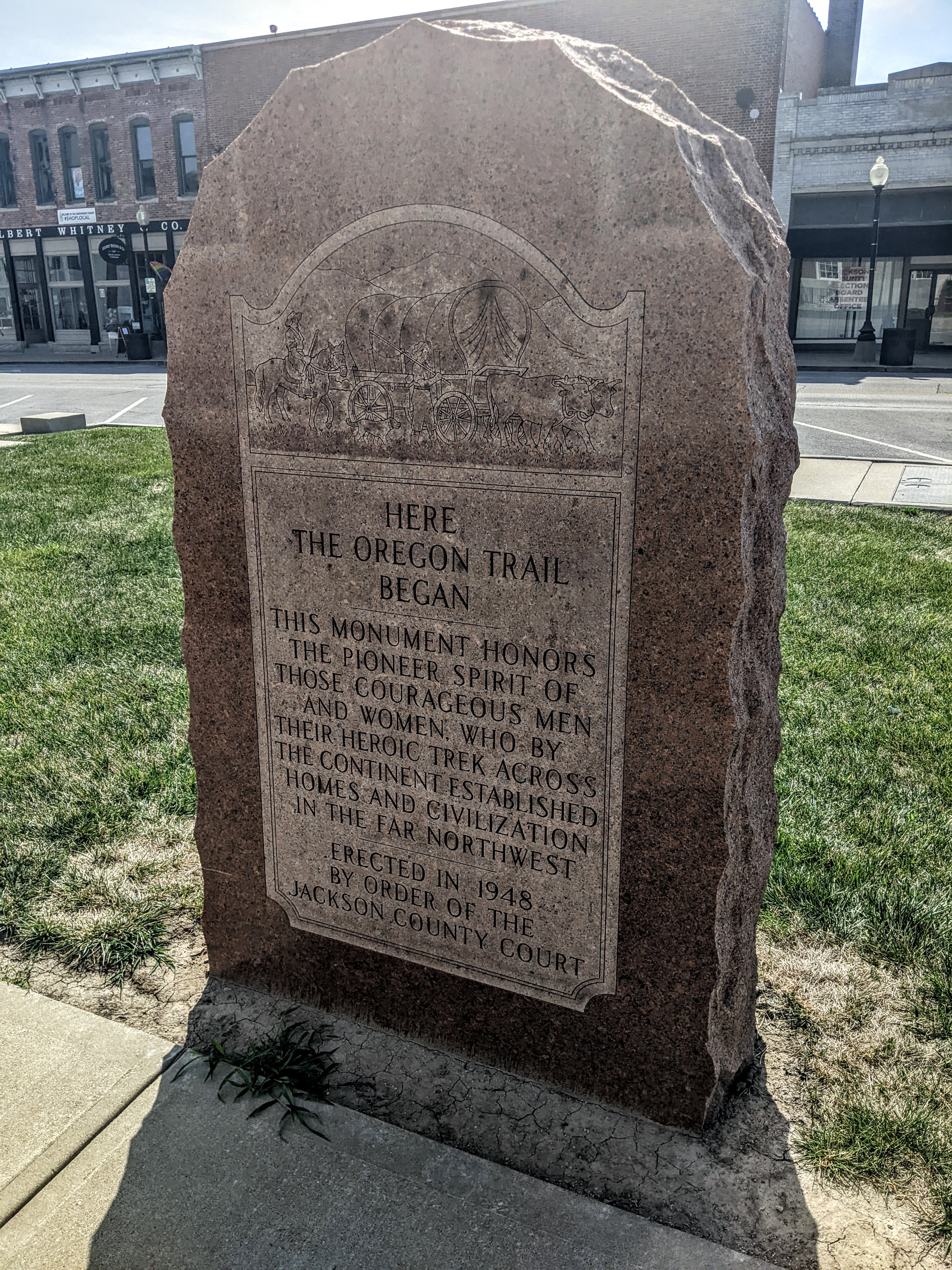
Monument located at the starting point of The Oregon Trail in Independence, Missouri.

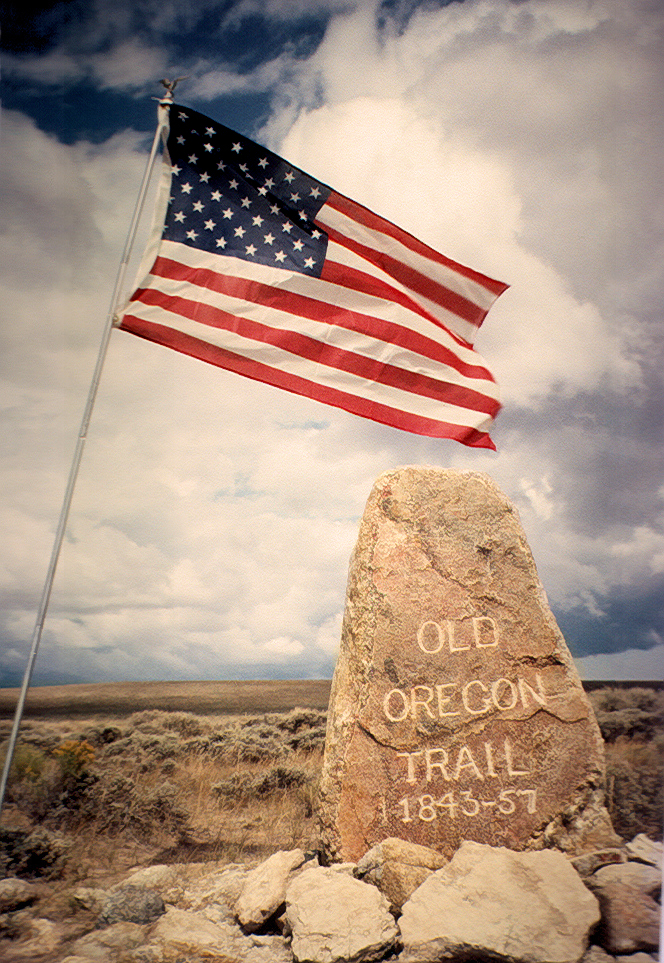
Oregon Trail pioneer Ezra Meeker erected this boulder near Pacific Springs on Wyoming's South Pass in 1906.

As the trail developed it became marked by many cutoffs and shortcuts from Missouri to Oregon. The basic route follows river valleys as grass and water were necessary.

While the first few parties organized and departed from Elm Grove, the Oregon Trail's primary starting points were Independence, Missouri, or Westport, (which was annexed into modern day Kansas City), on the Missouri River. Later, several feeder trails led across Kansas, and other towns became notable starting points, including Weston, Fort Leavenworth, Atchison, St. Joseph, and Omaha.

The Oregon Trail's nominal termination point was Oregon City, at the time the proposed capital of the Oregon Territory. However, many settlers branched off or stopped short of this goal and settled at convenient or promising locations along the trail. Commerce with pioneers going further west helped establish these early settlements and launched local economies critical to their prosperity.

At dangerous or difficult river crossings, ferries or toll bridges were set up and bad places on the trail were either repaired or bypassed. Several toll roads were constructed. Gradually the trail became easier with the average trip (as recorded in numerous diaries) dropping from about 160 days in 1849 to 140 days 10 years later.

Many other trails followed the Oregon Trail for much of its length, including the Mormon Trail from Illinois to Utah; the California Trail to the gold fields of California; and the Bozeman Trail to Montana. Because it was more a network of trails than a single trail, there were numerous variations with other trails eventually established on both sides of the Platte, North Platte, Snake, and Columbia rivers. With literally thousands of people and thousands of livestock traveling in a fairly small time slot, the travelers had to spread out to find clean water, wood, good campsites, and grass. The dust kicked up by the many travelers was a constant complaint, and where the terrain would allow it there may have been between 20 and 50 wagons traveling abreast.

Remnants of the trail in Kansas, Nebraska, Wyoming, Idaho, and Oregon have been listed on the National Register of Historic Places, and the entire trail is a designated National Historic Trail.

=== Missouri ===
Initially, the main jumping-off point was the common head of the Santa Fe Trail and Oregon trail— Independence, and Kansas City. Travelers starting in Independence had to ferry across the Missouri River. After following the Santa Fe trail to near present-day Topeka, they ferried across the Kansas River to start the trek across Kansas and points west. Another busy "jumping off point" was St. Joseph—established in 1843. In its early days, St. Joseph was a bustling outpost and rough frontier town, serving as one of the last supply points before heading over the Missouri River to the frontier. St. Joseph had good steamboat connections to St. Louis and other ports on the combined Ohio, Missouri, and Mississippi River systems. During the busy season, there were several ferry boats and steamboats available to transport travelers to the Kansas shore where they started their travels westward. Before the Union Pacific Railroad was started in 1865, St. Joseph was the westernmost point in the United States accessible by rail. Other towns used as supply points in Missouri included Old Franklin, Arrow Rock, and Fort Osage.

=== Iowa ===
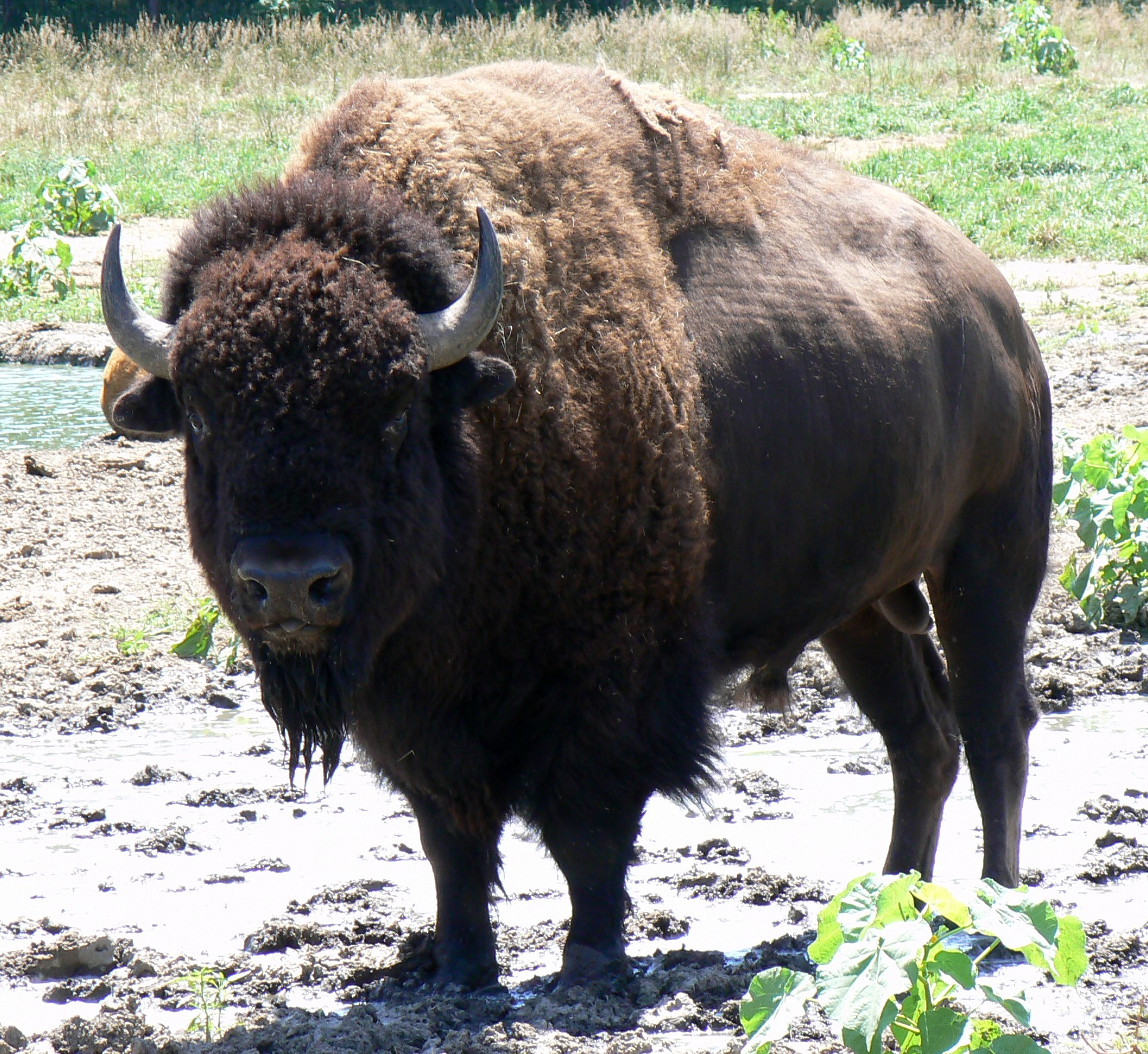
A bison bull on a Nebraska wildlife refuge

The Lewis and Clark Expedition stopped several times in the future state of Iowa on their 1805–1806 expedition to the west coast. Some settlers started drifting into Iowa in 1833. In 1846, the Mormons, expelled from Nauvoo, Illinois, traversed Iowa (on part of the Mormon Trail) and settled temporarily in significant numbers on the Missouri River in Iowa and the future state of Nebraska at their Winter Quarters near the future city of Omaha, Nebraska. The Mormons established about 50 temporary towns including the town of Kanesville, Iowa (renamed Council Bluffs in 1852), on the east bank of the Missouri River opposite the mouth of the Platte River. For travelers bringing their teams to the Platte River junction, Kanesville, and other towns became major jumping-off places and supply points. In 1847 the Mormons established three ferries across the Missouri River and others established even more ferries for the spring start on the trail. In the 1850 census, there were about 8,000 mostly Mormons tabulated in the large Pottawattamie County, Iowa District 21. (The original Pottawattamie County was subsequently made into five counties and parts of several more.) By 1854, most of the Mormon towns, farms, and villages were largely taken over by non-Mormons as they abandoned them or sold them for not much and continued their migration to Utah. After 1846, the towns of Council Bluffs, Iowa, Omaha (est. 1852), and other Missouri River towns became major supply points and jumping-off places for travelers on the Mormon, California, Oregon, and other trails west.

=== Kansas ===
Starting initially in Independence, Missouri, or Kansas City in Missouri, the initial trail follows the Santa Fe Trail into Kansas south of the Wakarusa River. After crossing Mount Oread at Lawrence, the trail crosses the Kansas River by ferry or boats near Topeka and crosses the Wakarusa and Black Vermillion rivers by ferries. West of Topeka, the route paralleled what is now U.S. Route 24 until west of St. Mary's. After the Black Vermillion River, the trail angles northwest to Nebraska paralleling the Little Blue River until reaching the south side of the Platte River. Destinations along the Oregon Trail in Kansas included St. Mary's Mission, Pottawatomie Indian Pay Station, Vieux's Vermilion Crossing, Alcove Springs and the Hollenberg Station which was built for and used concurrently in 1860 and 1861 by the Pony Express. Travel by wagon over the gently rolling Kansas countryside was usually unimpeded except where streams had cut steep banks. There a passage could be made with a lot of shovel work to cut down the banks or the travelers could find an already established crossing.

=== Nebraska ===
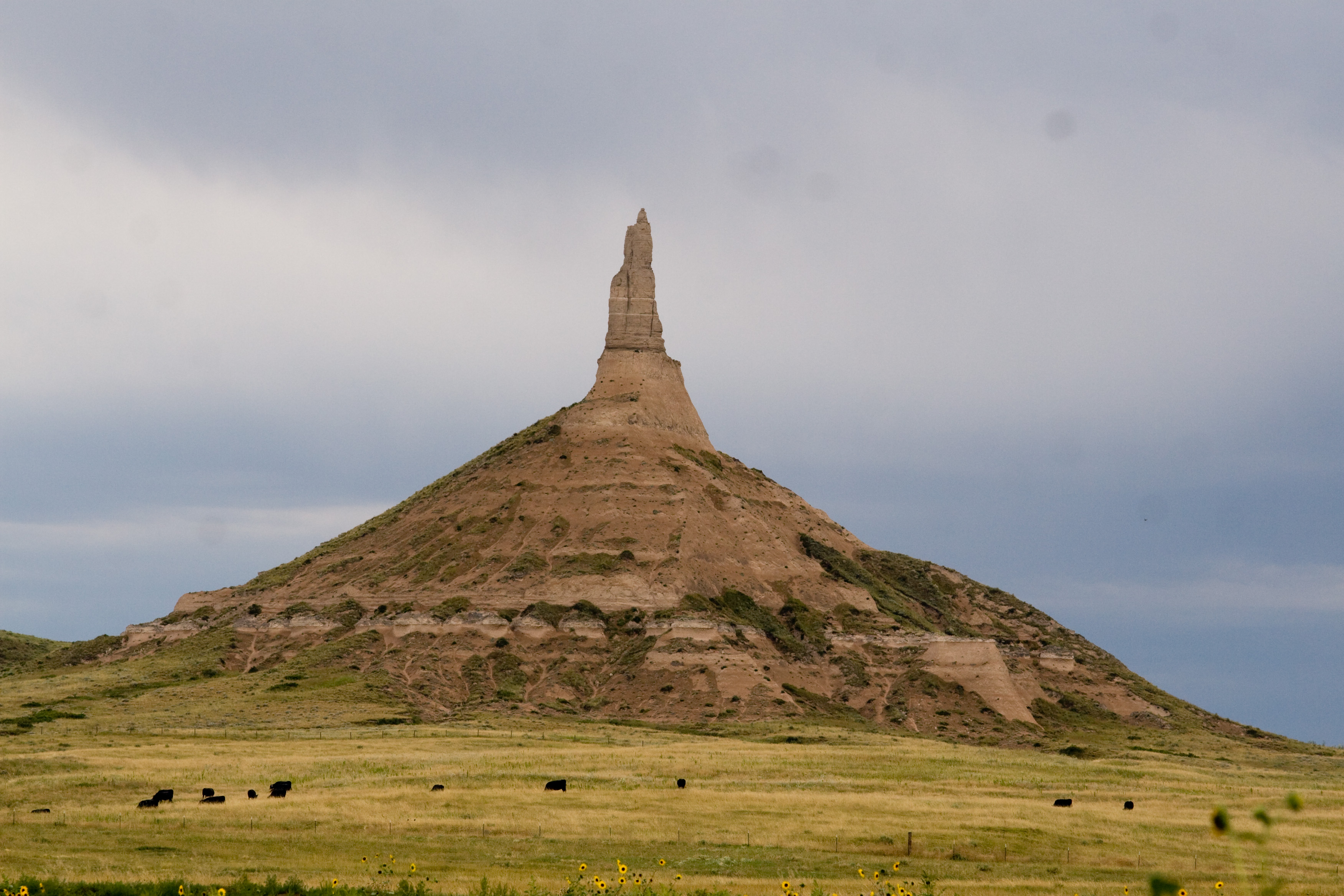
Chimney Rock, Nebraska

Those emigrants on the eastern side of the Missouri River in Missouri or Iowa used ferries and steamboats (fitted out for ferry duty) to cross into towns in Nebraska. Several towns in Nebraska were used as jumping-off places with Omaha eventually becoming a favorite after about 1855. Fort Kearny (est. 1848) is about 200 miles (320 km) from the Missouri River, and the trail and its many offshoots nearly all converged close to Fort Kearny as they followed the Platte River west. The army-maintained Fort was the first chance on the trail to buy emergency supplies, do repairs, get medical aid, or mail a letter. Those on the north side of the Platte could usually wade the shallow river if they needed to visit the fort.

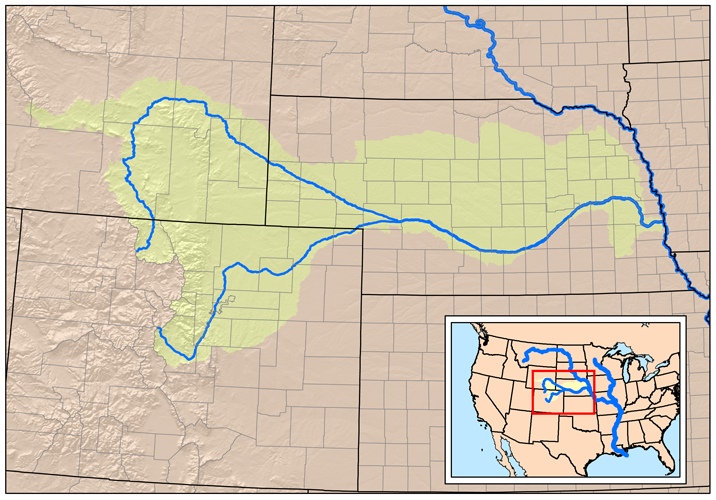
Map showing the Platte River watershed, including the North Platte and South Platte tributaries

The Platte River and the North Platte River in the future states of Nebraska and Wyoming typically had many channels and islands and were too shallow, crooked, muddy, and unpredictable for travel even by canoe. The Platte as it pursued its braided paths to the Missouri River was "too thin to plow and too thick to drink". While unusable for transportation, the Platte River and North Platte River valleys provided an easily passable wagon corridor going almost due west with access to water, grass, buffalo, and buffalo chips for fuel. The trails gradually got rougher as it progressed up the North Platte. There were trails on both sides of the muddy rivers. The Platte was about 1 mile (1.6 km) wide and 2 to 60 inches (5.1 to 152.4 cm) deep. The water was silty and bad tasting but it could be used if no other water was available. Letting it sit in a bucket for an hour or so or stirring in a 1/4 cup of cornmeal allowed most of the silt to settle out.

In the spring in Nebraska and Wyoming travelers often encountered fierce wind, rain, and lightning storms. Until about 1870 travelers encountered hundreds of thousands of bison migrating through Nebraska on both sides of the Platte River, and most travelers killed several for fresh meat and to build up their supplies of dried jerky for the rest of the journey. The prairie grass in many places was several feet high with only the hat of a traveler on horseback showing as they passed through the prairie grass. In many years the Native Americans fired much of the dry grass on the prairie every fall so the only trees or bushes available for firewood were on islands in the Platte River. Travelers gathered and ignited dried cow dung to cook their meals. These burned fast in a breeze, and it could take two or more bushels of chips to get one meal prepared. Those traveling south of the Platte crossed the South Platte fork at one of about three ferries (in dry years it could be forded without a ferry) before continuing up the North Platte River Valley into present-day Wyoming heading to Fort Laramie. Before 1852 those on the north side of the Platte crossed the North Platte to the south side at Fort Laramie. After 1852 they used Child's Cutoff to stay on the north side to about the present-day town of Casper, Wyoming, where they crossed over to the south side.

Notable landmarks in Nebraska include Courthouse and Jail Rocks, Chimney Rock, Scotts Bluff, and Ash Hollow with its steep descent down Windlass Hill over the South Platte.

Today much of the Oregon Trail follows roughly along Interstate 80 from Wyoming to Grand Island, Nebraska. From there U.S. Highway 30 which follows the Platte River is a better approximate path for those traveling the north side of the Platte.

==== Cholera on the Platte River ====
Because of the Platte's brackish water, the preferred camping spots were along one of the many freshwater streams draining into the Platte or the occasional freshwater spring found along the way. These preferred camping spots became sources of cholera in the epidemic years (1849–1855) as many thousands of people used the same camping spots with essentially no sewage facilities or adequate sewage treatment. One of the side effects of cholera is acute diarrhea, which helps contaminate even more water unless it is isolated and/or treated. The cause of cholera (ingesting the Vibrio cholerae bacterium from contaminated water) and the best treatment for cholera infections were unknown in this era. Thousands of travelers on the combined California, Oregon, and Mormon trails succumbed to cholera between 1849 and 1855. Most were buried in unmarked graves in Kansas, Nebraska, and Wyoming. Although also considered part of the Mormon Trail, the grave of Rebecca Winters is one of the few marked ones left. There are many cases cited involving people who were alive and healthy in the morning and dead by nightfall.

Most outbreaks did not progress further west than Fort Laramie. It is believed that the swifter flowing rivers in Wyoming helped prevent the germs from spreading.

=== Colorado ===
A branch of the Oregon trail crossed the very northeast corner of Colorado if they followed the South Platte River to one of its last crossings. This branch of the trail passed through present-day Julesburg before entering Wyoming. Later settlers followed the Platte and South Platte Rivers into their settlements there (much of which became the state of Colorado).

=== Wyoming ===
After crossing the South Platte River the Oregon Trail follows the North Platte River out of Nebraska into Wyoming. Fort Laramie, at the confluence of the Laramie and North Platte rivers, was a major stopping point. Fort Laramie was a former fur trading outpost originally named Fort John that was purchased in 1848 by the U.S. Army to protect travelers on the trails. It was the last army outpost till travelers reached the coast.

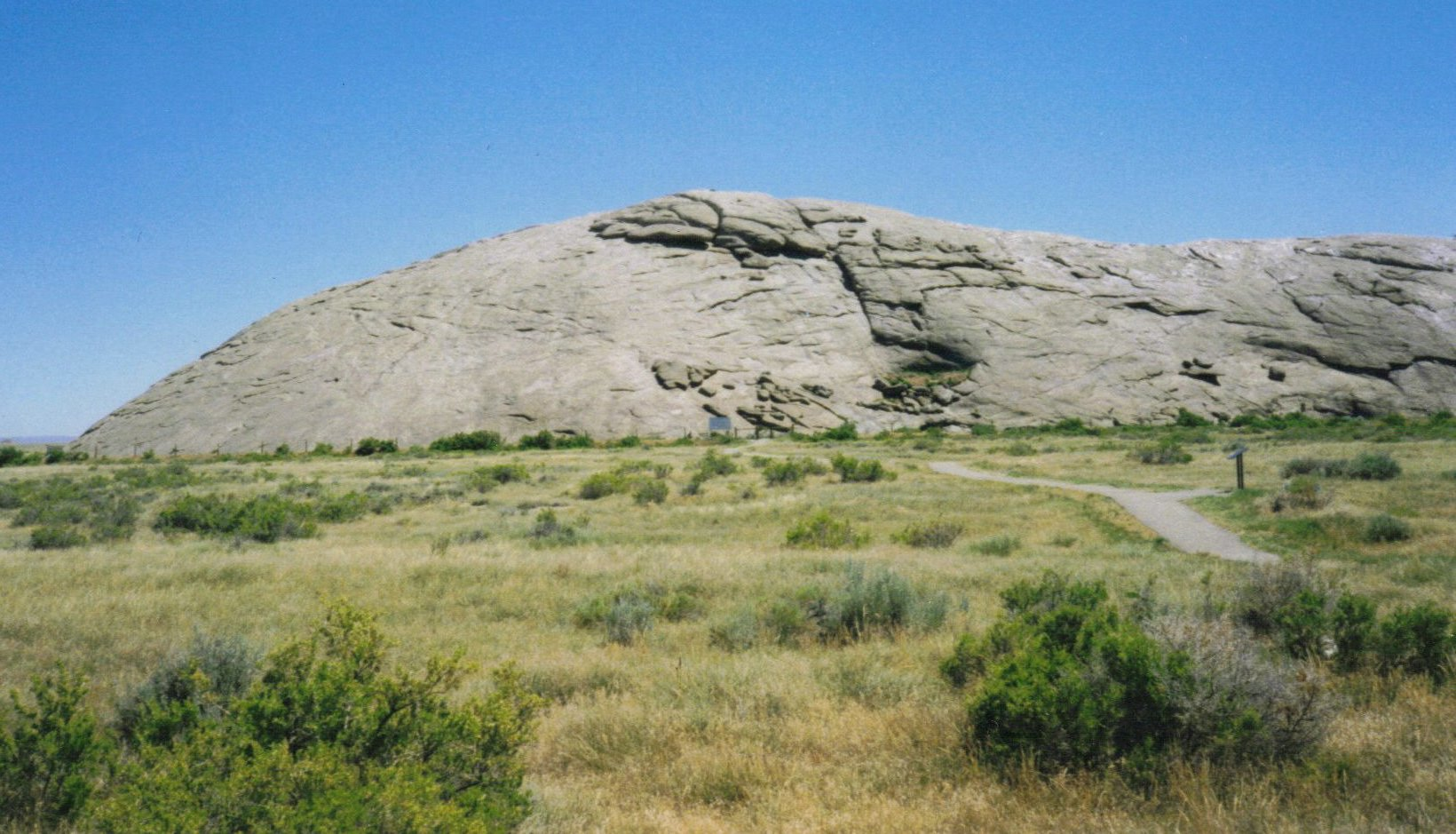
Independence Rock

After crossing the South Platte the trail continues up the North Platte River, crossing many small swift-flowing creeks. As the North Platte veers to the south, the trail crosses the North Platte to the Sweetwater River Valley, which heads almost due west. Independence Rock is on the Sweetwater River. The Sweetwater would have to be crossed up to nine times before the trail crosses over the Continental Divide at South Pass, Wyoming. From South Pass the trail continues southwest crossing Big Sandy Creek— about 10 feet (3.0 m) wide and 1 foot (0.30 m) deep— before hitting the Green River. Three to five ferries were in use on the Green during peak travel periods. The deep, wide, swift, and treacherous Green River which eventually empties into the Colorado River, was usually at high water in July and August, and it was a dangerous crossing. After crossing the Green, the main trail continued approximately southwest until the Blacks Fork of the Green River and Fort Bridger. From Fort Bridger the Mormon Trail continued southwest following the upgraded Hastings Cutoff through the Wasatch Mountains. From Fort Bridger, the main trail, comprising several variants, veered northwest over the Bear River Divide and descended to the Bear River Valley. The trail turned north following the Bear River past the terminus of the Sublette-Greenwood Cutoff at Smiths Fork and on to the Thomas Fork Valley at the present Wyoming–Idaho border.

Over time, two major heavily used cutoffs were established in Wyoming. The Sublette-Greenwood Cutoff was established in 1844 and cut about 70 miles (110 km) off the main route. It leaves the main trail about 10 miles (16 km) west of South Pass and heads almost due west crossing Big Sandy Creek and then about 45 miles (72 km) of waterless, very dusty desert before reaching the Green River near the present town of La Barge. Ferries here transferred them across the Green River. From there the Sublette–Greenwood Cutoff trail had to cross a mountain range to connect with the main trail near Cokeville in the Bear River Valley.

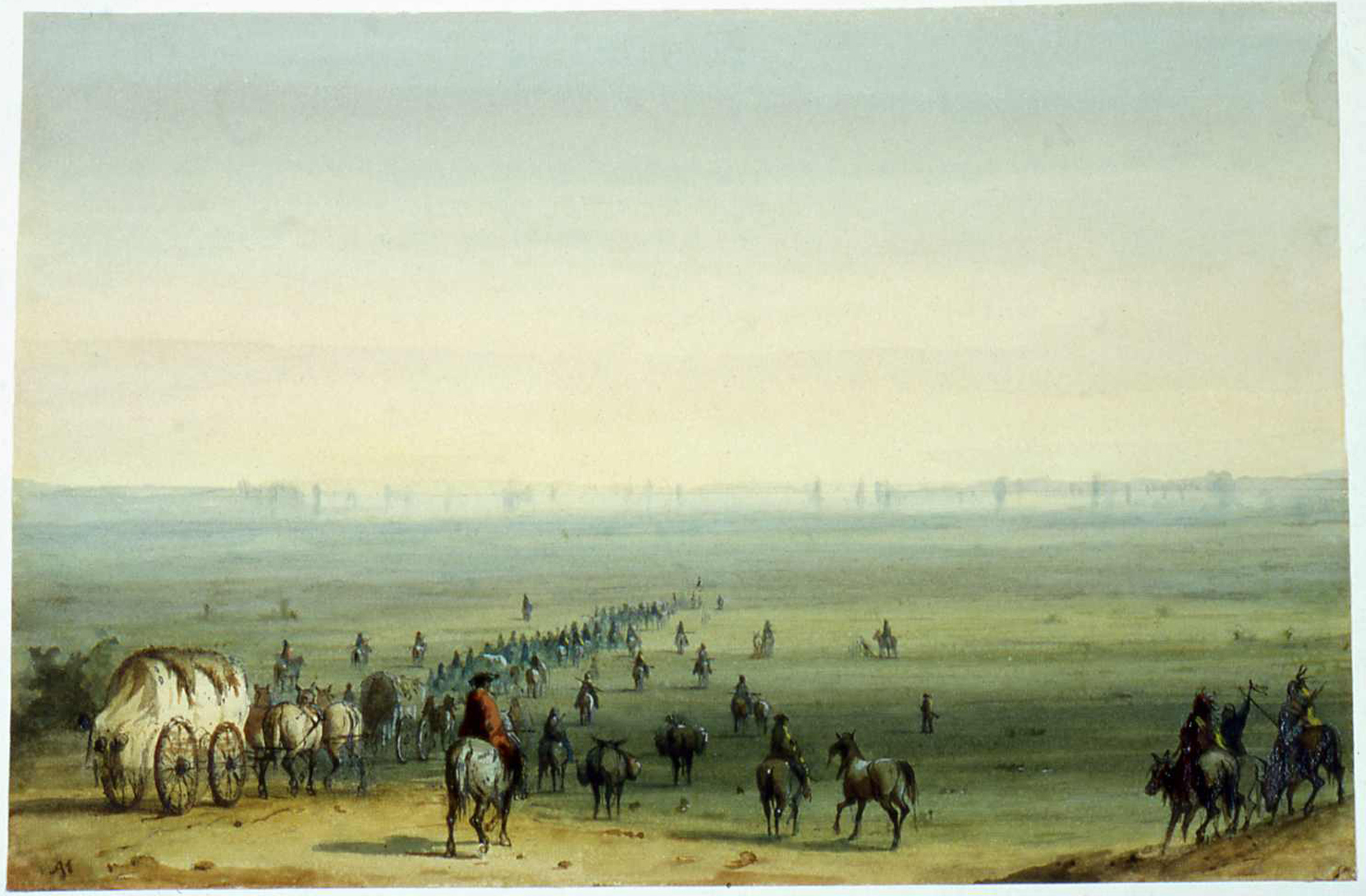
Prairie Scene: Mirage, by Alfred Jacob Miller

The Lander Road, formally the Fort Kearney, South Pass, and Honey Lake Wagon Road, was established and built by U.S. government contractors in 1858–59. It was about 80 miles (130 km) shorter than the main trail through Fort Bridger with good grass, water, firewood, and fishing but it was a much steeper and rougher route, crossing three mountain ranges. In 1859, 13,000 of the 19,000 Emigrants traveling to California and Oregon used the Lander Road. The traffic in later years is undocumented.

The Lander Road departs the main trail at Burnt Ranch near South Pass, crosses the Continental Divide north of South Pass, and reaches the Green River near the present town of Big Piney, Wyoming. From there the trail followed Big Piney Creek west before passing over the 8,800 feet (2,700 m) Thompson Pass in the Wyoming Range. It then crosses over the Smith Fork of the Bear River before ascending and crossing another 8,200-foot (2,500 m) pass on the Salt River Range of mountains and then descending into Star Valley. It exited the mountains near the present Smith Fork road about 6 miles (9.7 km) south of the town of Smoot. The road continued almost due north along the present-day Wyoming; Idaho western border through Star Valley. To avoid crossing the Salt River (which drains into the Snake River) which runs down Star Valley the Lander Road crossed the river when it was small and stayed west of the Salt River. After traveling down the Salt River Valley (Star Valley) about 20 miles (32 km) north the road turned almost due west near the present town of Auburn, and entered into the present state of Idaho along Stump Creek. In Idaho, it followed the Stump Creek valley northwest until it crossed the Caribou Range and proceeded past the south end of Grays Lake. The trail then proceeded almost due west to meet the main trail at Fort Hall; alternatively, a branch trail headed almost due south to meet the main trail near the present town of Soda Springs.

Numerous landmarks are along the trail in Wyoming including Independence Rock, Ayres Natural Bridge, and Register Cliff.

=== Utah ===
In 1847, Brigham Young and the Mormon pioneers departed from the Oregon Trail at Fort Bridger in Wyoming and followed (and much improved) the rough trail originally recommended by Lansford Hastings to the Donner Party in 1846 through the Wasatch Mountains into Utah. After getting into Utah, they immediately started setting up irrigated farms and cities—including Salt Lake City. In 1848, the Salt Lake Cutoff was established by Sam Hensley, and returning members of the Mormon Battalion providing a path north of the Great Salt Lake from Salt Lake City back to the California and Oregon trails. This cutoff rejoined the Oregon and California Trails near the City of Rocks near the Utah; Idaho border and could be used by both California and Oregon-bound travelers. Located about halfway on both the California and Oregon trails many thousands of later travelers used Salt Lake City and other Utah cities as an intermediate stop for selling or trading excess goods or tired livestock for fresh livestock, repairs, supplies, or fresh vegetables. The Mormons looked on these travelers as a welcome bonanza as setting up new communities from scratch required nearly everything the travelers could afford to part with. The overall distance to California or Oregon was very close to the same whether one "detoured" to Salt Lake City or not. For their use and to encourage California and Oregon-bound travelers the Mormons improved the Mormon Trail from Fort Bridger and the Salt Lake Cutoff trail. To raise much-needed money and facilitate travel on the Salt Lake Cutoff they set up several ferries across the Weber, Bear, and Malad Rivers, which were used mostly by travelers bound for Oregon or California.

=== Idaho ===
The main Oregon and California Trail went north from Fort Bridger to the Little Muddy Creek where it passed over the Bear River Mountains to the Bear River Valley, which it followed northwest into the Thomas Fork area, where the trail crossed over the present day Wyoming line into Idaho. In the Eastern Sheep Creek Hills in the Thomas Fork Valley, the emigrants encountered Big Hill, a detour caused by a then-impassable cut the Bear River made through the mountains, with a tough ascent often requiring doubling up of teams and a steep and dangerous descent. In 1852, Eliza Ann McAuley found the McAuley Cutoff, which bypassed much of the difficult climb and descent of Big Hill. About 5 miles (8.0 km) on they passed present-day Montpelier, Idaho, which is now the site of the National Oregon-California Trail Center. The trail follows the Bear River northwest to present-day Soda Springs, which attracted pioneers with hot carbonated water for laundry and chugging springs for fresh water. Just west of Soda Springs the Bear River turns southwest as it heads for the Great Salt Lake, and the main trail turns northwest to follow the Portneuf River valley to Fort Hall, Idaho. Fort Hall was a fur trading post located on the Snake River, established in 1832 by Nathaniel Jarvis Wyeth and company and later sold in 1837 to the Hudson's Bay Company. At Fort Hall, travelers were given available aid and supplies as needed. Mosquitoes were constant pests, and travelers often mentioned that their animals were covered with blood from the bites. The route from Fort Bridger to Fort Hall is about 210 miles (340 km), taking nine to twelve days.

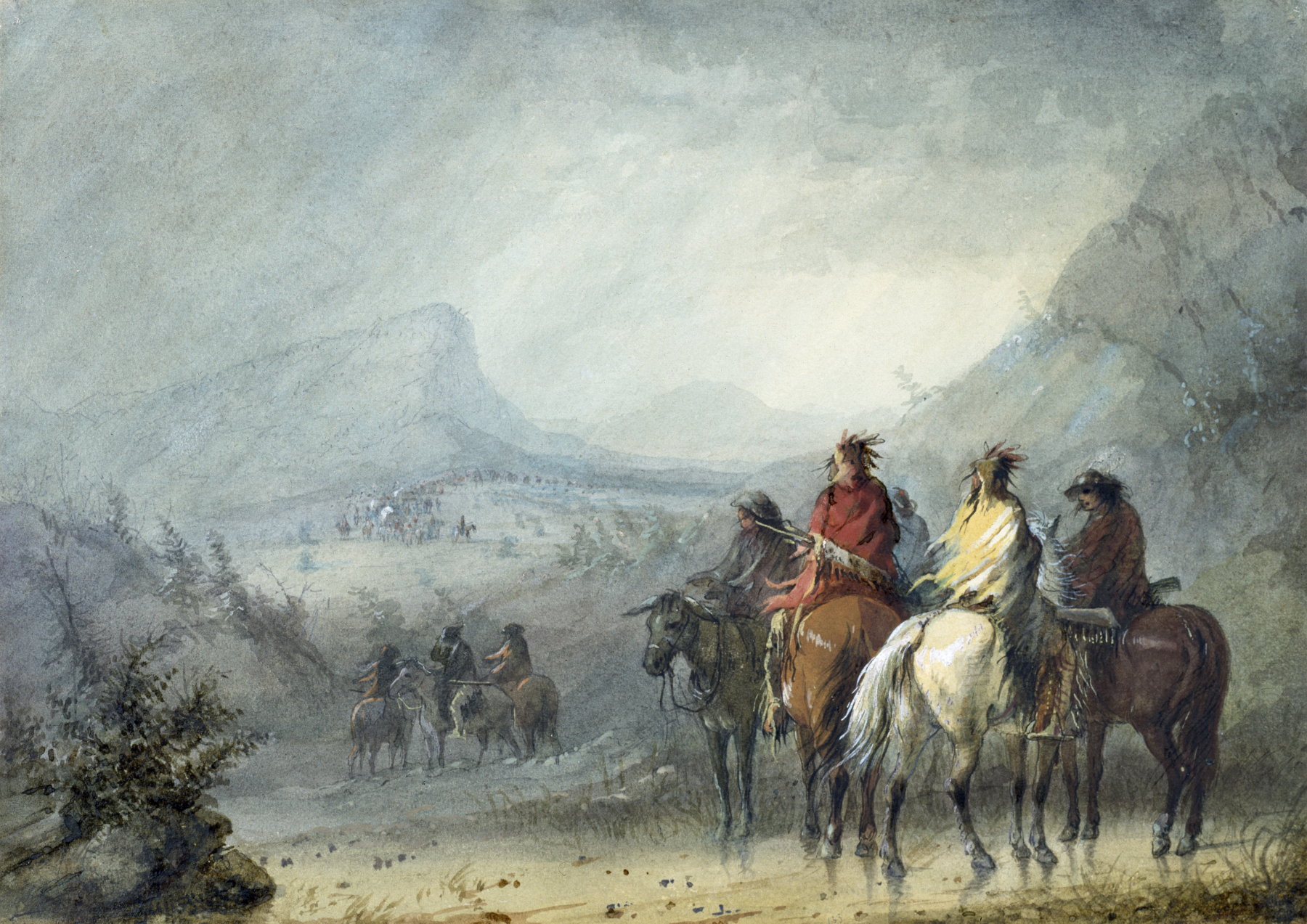
Storm: Waiting for the Caravan, by Alfred Jacob Miller

At Soda Springs was one branch of Lander Road (established and built with government contractors in 1858), which had gone west from near South Pass, over the Salt River Mountains and down Star Valley before turning west near present-day Auburn, Wyoming, and entering Idaho. From there it proceeded northwest into Idaho up Stump Creek canyon for about 10 miles (16 km). One branch turned almost 90 degrees and proceeded southwest to Soda Springs. Another branch headed almost due west past Gray's Lake to rejoin the main trail about 10 miles (16 km) west of Fort Hall.

On the main trail about 5 miles (8.0 km) west of Soda Springs Hudspeth's Cutoff (established in 1849 and used mostly by California trail users) took off from the main trail heading west, bypassing Fort Hall. It rejoined the California Trail at Cassia Creek near the City of Rocks. Hudspeth's Cutoff had five mountain ranges to cross and took about the same amount of time as the main route to Fort Hall, but many took it thinking it was shorter. Its main advantage was that it helped spread out the traffic during peak periods, increasing grass availability.

West of Fort Hall, the main trail traveled about 40 miles (64 km) on the south side of the Snake River southwest past American Falls, Massacre Rocks, Register Rock, and Coldwater Hill near present-day Pocatello, Idaho. Near the junction of the Raft River and Snake River, the California Trail diverged from the Oregon Trail. Travellers left the Snake River and followed the Raft River about 65 miles (105 km) southwest past present-day Almo. This trail then passed through the City of Rocks and over Granite Pass where it went southwest along Goose Creek, Little Goose Creek, and Rock Spring Creek. It went about 95 miles (153 km) through Thousand Springs Valley, West Brush Creek, and Willow Creek, before arriving at the Humboldt River in northeastern Nevada near present-day Wells. The California Trail proceeded west down the Humboldt before reaching and crossing the Sierra Nevada.

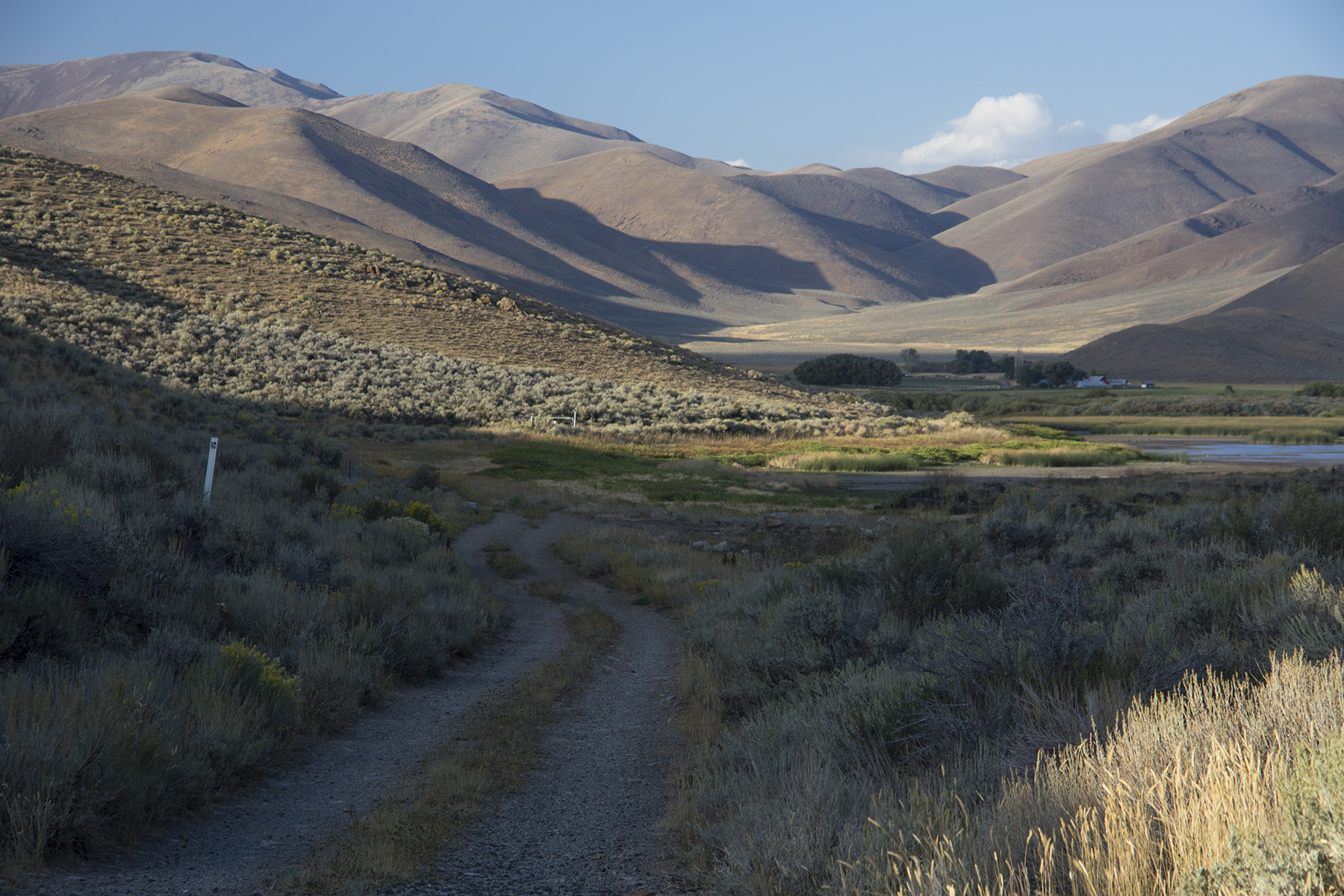
Goodale's Cutoff of the Oregon Trail at Lava Lake, west of Arco, Idaho and east of Carey, Idaho along US 26, 20, 93. Picture of current two tracks along a section of the cutoff of the Oregon Trail.

The Snake River's depth and fast water meant that there were few places to safely cross. Two of these fords were near Fort Hall, where travelers on the Oregon Trail North Side Alternate (established about 1852) and Goodale's Cutoff (established 1862) crossed the Snake to travel on the north side. Nathaniel Wyeth wrote in his diary that his party found a ford across the Snake River 4 miles (6.4 km) southwest of where he founded Fort Hall. Another possible crossing was a few miles upstream of Salmon Falls where some intrepid travelers floated their wagons and swam their stock across to join the north side trail. Some lost their wagons and teams over the falls. The trails on the north side joined the trail from Three Island Crossing about 17 miles (27 km) west of Glenns Ferry on the north side of the Snake River.

Goodale's Cutoff, established in 1862 on the north side of the Snake River, formed a spur of the Oregon Trail. This cutoff had been used as a pack trail by Native Americans and fur traders, and emigrant wagons traversed parts of the eastern section as early as 1852. After crossing the Snake River the 230-mile (370 km) cutoff headed north from Fort Hall toward Big Southern Butte following the Lost River part of the way. It passed near the present-day town of Arco, Idaho, and wound through the northern part of what is now Craters of the Moon National Monument. From there it went southwest to Camas Prairie and ended at Old Fort Boise on the Boise River. This journey typically took two to three weeks and was noted for its rough lava terrain and extremely dry climate, which tended to dry the ward on the wagons, causing the iron rims to fall off the wheels. The loss of wheels caused many wagons to be abandoned along the route. It rejoined the main trail east of Boise. Goodale's Cutoff is visible at many points along U.S. Routes 20, 26, and 93 between Craters of the Moon National Monument and Carey.

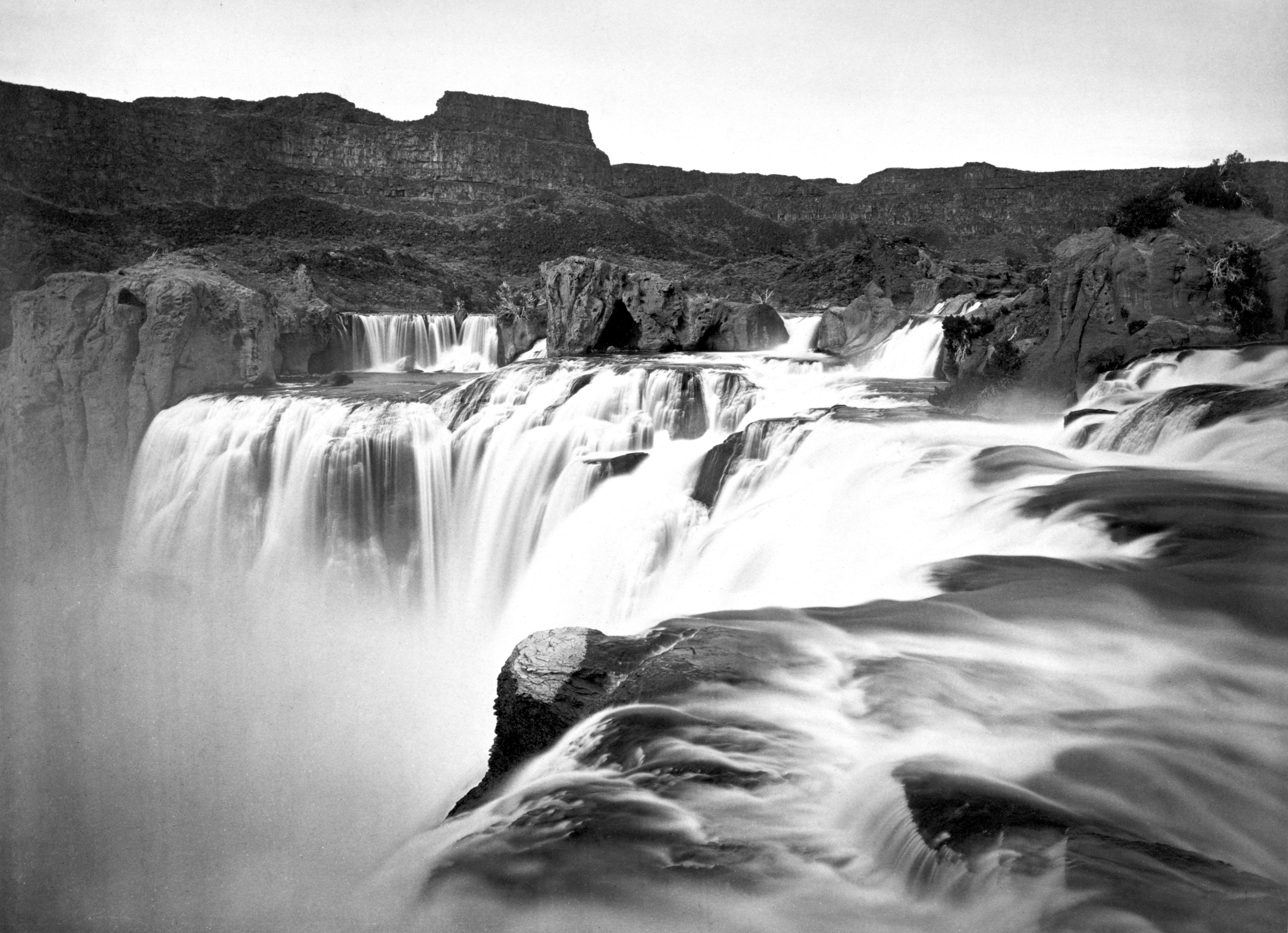
View across top of Shoshone Falls, Snake River, Idaho (Timothy H. O'Sullivan, 1874)

From the present site of Pocatello, the trail proceeded west on the south side of the Snake River for about 180 miles (290 km). This route passed Cauldron Linn rapids, Shoshone Falls, two falls near the present city of Twin Falls, and Upper Salmon Falls on the Snake River. At Salmon Falls there were often a hundred or more Native Americans fishing who would trade for their salmon.

The trail continued west to Three Island Crossing (near present-day Glenns Ferry). Here most emigrants used the divisions of the river caused by three islands to cross the difficult and swift Snake River by ferry, or by driving or sometimes floating their wagons and swimming their teams across. Hidden holes in the river bottom could overturn the wagon or entangle the team, and several drownings occurred nearly every year before ferries were established.

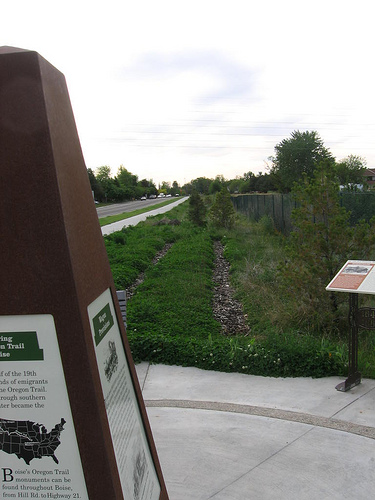
One of Boise's 21 Oregon Trail monuments.

The north side of the Snake had better water and grass than the south. The trail from Three Island Crossing to Old Fort Boise was about 130 miles (210 km) long. The next and final crossing of the Snake River was near Old Fort Boise, and could be done on bullboats while swimming the stock across. Others would chain a large string of wagons and teams together, hoping that the front teams, usually oxen, would get out of the water first and with good footing help pull the whole string of wagons and teams across. Often, Native American boys who could swim were hired to drive and ride the stock across the river. In present-day Idaho, Interstate 84 roughly follows the Oregon Trail from the Idaho-Oregon State border at the Snake River. Approximately seven miles (11 km) east of Declo in present-day rural Cassia County, Interstate 84 meets the western terminus of the western section of Interstate 86. Interstate 86 heads east, then northeast to American Falls and Pocatello following the Oregon Trail, while Interstate 84 heads southeast to the State border with Utah. U.S. Route 30 roughly follows the path of the Oregon Trail from Pocatello to Montpelier.

Starting in about 1848, the South Alternate of Oregon Trail (also called the Snake River Cutoff) was developed as a spur off the main trail. It bypassed the Three Island Crossing and continued traveling down the south side of the Snake River. It rejoined the trail near present-day Ontario, Oregon. It hugged the southern edge of the Snake River Canyon and was a much rougher trail with poorer water and grass, requiring occasional steep descents and ascents with the animals down into the Snake River Canyon to get water. Travelers on this route avoided two dangerous crossings of the Snake River. In present-day Idaho, the state highway ID-78 roughly follows the path of the South Alternate route of the Oregon Trail.

In 1869, the Central Pacific established Kelton, Utah as a railhead and the terminus of the western mail was moved from Salt Lake City. The Kelton Road became important as a communication and transportation road to the Boise Basin.

Boise has 21 monuments in the shape of obelisks along its portion of the Oregon Trail.

=== Oregon ===
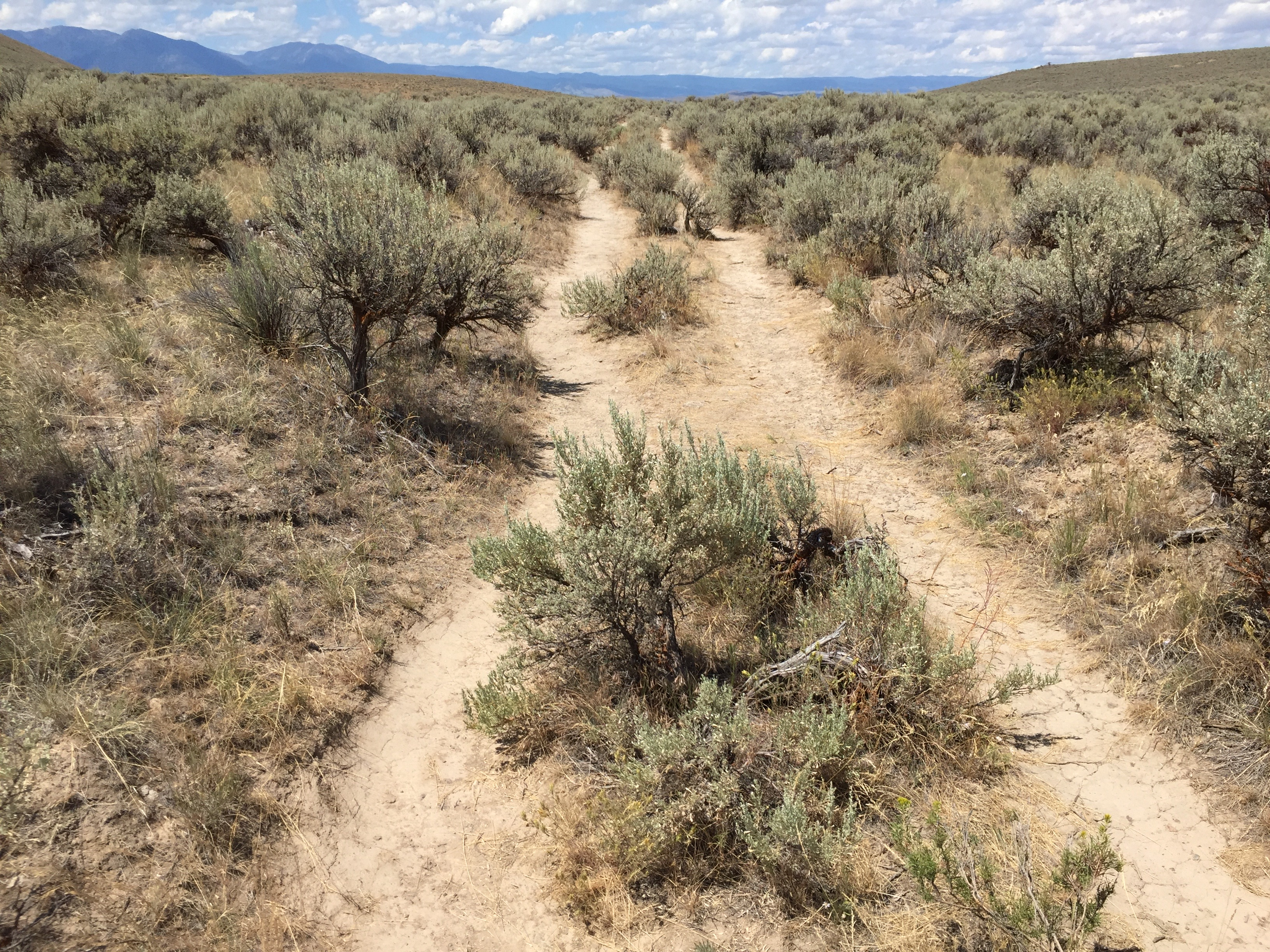
Present-day footpaths following ruts of the Oregon Trail near the National Historic Oregon Trail Interpretive Center east of Baker City, Oregon

Once across the Snake River ford near Old Fort Boise the weary travelers traveled across what would become the state of Oregon. The trail then went to the Malheur River and then past Farewell Bend on the Snake River, up the Burnt River canyon and northwest to the Grande Ronde Valley near present-day La Grande before coming to the Blue Mountains. In 1843 settlers cut a wagon road over these mountains making them passable for the first time to wagons. The trail went to the Whitman Mission near Fort Nez Perces in Washington until 1847 when the Whitmans were killed by Native Americans. At Fort Nez Perce some built rafts or hired boats and started down the Columbia; others continued west in their wagons until they reached The Dalles. After 1847 the trail bypassed the closed mission and headed almost due west to present-day Pendleton, Oregon, crossing the Umatilla River, John Day River, and Deschutes River before arriving at The Dalles. Interstate 84 in Oregon roughly follows the original Oregon Trail from Idaho to The Dalles.

Arriving at the Columbia at The Dalles and stopped by the Cascade Mountains and Mount Hood, some gave up their wagons or disassembled them and put them on boats or rafts for a trip down the Columbia River. Once they transited the Cascade's Columbia River Gorge with its multiple rapids and treacherous winds they would have to make the 1.6-mile (2.6 km) portage around the Cascade Rapids before coming out near the Willamette River where Oregon City was located. The pioneer's livestock could be driven around Mount Hood on the narrow, crooked, and rough Lolo Pass.

Several Oregon Trail branches and route variations led to the Willamette Valley. The most popular was the Barlow Road, which was carved through the forest around Mount Hood from The Dalles in 1846 as a toll road at $5 per wagon and 10 cents per head of livestock. It was rough and steep with poor grass but still cheaper and safer than floating goods, wagons, and family down the dangerous Columbia River.

In Central Oregon, there was the Santiam Wagon Road (established 1861), which roughly parallels Oregon Highway 20 to the Willamette Valley. The Applegate Trail (established 1846), cutting off the California Trail from the Humboldt River in Nevada, crossed part of California before cutting north to the south end of the Willamette Valley. U.S. Route 99 and Interstate 5 through Oregon roughly follow the original Applegate Trail.

== Travel equipment ==
=== Wagons and pack animals ===
Three types of draft and pack animals were used by Oregon Trail pioneers: oxen, mules, and horses.

By 1842, many emigrants favored oxen— castrated bulls (males) of the genus Bos (cattle), generally over four years old; as the best animal to pull wagons, because they were docile, generally healthy, and able to continue moving in difficult conditions such as mud and snow. Oxen could also survive on prairie grasses and sage, unlike horses, who had to be fed. Moreover, oxen were less expensive to purchase and maintain than horses. Oxen also could stand idle for long periods without suffering damage to the feet and legs. Oxen were trained by leading, the use of a whip or goad, and the use of oral commands (such as "Gee" (right), "Haw" (left), and "Whoa" (stop)). Two oxen were typically yoked together at the neck or head; the left ox was referred to as the "near" or "nigh" ox, and the right ox as the "off" ox. While no reins, bits, or halters were needed, the trainer had to be forceful. Oxen typically traveled at a steady pace up to two miles an hour.

One drawback of oxen was the difficulty of shoeing. Oxen hooves are cloven (split), and they had to be shod with two curved pieces of metal, one on each side of the hoof. While horses and mules allowed themselves to be shod relatively easily, the process was more difficult with oxen, who would lie down and tuck their feet under themselves. As a result, several men had to lift and hold an ox while he was being shod.

Mules were used by some emigrants. The competing merits of oxen and mules were hotly debated among emigrants. Some found oxen to be more durable. Others, by contrast, believed that mules were more durable, and mules may have had a lower attrition rate on the trail than oxen. Like oxen, mules could survive on prairie grasses. Mules were, however, notoriously ill-tempered. Mules also cost about three times as much as oxen, a deciding factor for many emigrants.

Three types of wagons were pulled:

- Conestoga wagons, a heavy type of covered wagon
- Covered wagon ("prairie schooners"), lighter than a Conestoga and often just a covered farm wagon.
- Studebaker (see § History)

=== Food ===
In 1855, the typical cost of food for four people for six months was about $150 which would cost almost $5,000 today.

Food and water were key concerns for migrants. Wagons typically carried at least one large water keg, and guidebooks available from the 1840s and later gave similar advice to migrants on what food to take. T. H. Jefferson, in his Brief Practice Advice guidebook for migrants, recommended that each adult take 200 pounds of flour: "Take plenty of breadstuffs; this is the staff of life when everything else runs short."

Food often took the form of crackers or hardtack; Southerners sometimes chose cornmeal or pinole rather than wheat flour. Emigrants typically ate rice and beans only at forts stopped at along the way, because boiling water was difficult on the trail, and fuel was not abundant. Lansford Hastings recommended that each emigrant take 200 pounds of flour, 150 pounds of "bacon" (a word which, at the time, referred broadly to all forms of salt pork), 20 pounds of sugar, and 10 pounds of salt. Chipped beef, rice, tea, dried beans, dried fruit, saleratus (for raising bread), vinegar, pickles, mustard, and tallow might also be taken. Joseph Ware's 1849 guide recommends that travelers take for each individual a barrel of flour or 180 pounds of ship's biscuit (i.e., hardtack), 150–180 pounds of bacon, 60 pounds of beans or peas, 25 pounds of rice, 25 pounds of coffee, 40 pounds of sugar, a keg of lard, 30 or 40 pounds of dried fruit (peaches or apples), a keg of clear, rendered beef suet (to substitute for butter), as well as some vinegar, salt, and pepper. Many emigrant families also carried a small amount of tea and maple sugar.

Randolph B. Marcy, an army officer who wrote an 1859 guide, advised taking less bacon than the earlier guides had recommended. He advised emigrants to drive cattle instead as a source of fresh beef. Marcy also instructed emigrants to store sides of bacon in canvas bags or in boxes surrounded by bran to protect against extreme heat, which could make bacon go rancid. Marcy instructed emigrants to put salt pork on the bottom of wagons to avoid exposure to extreme heat. Marcy also recommended the use of pemmican, as well as the storage of sugar in India rubber or gutta-percha sacks, to prevent it from becoming wet.

Canning technology had just begun to be developed, and it gained in popularity through the period of westward expansion. Initially, only upper-class migrants typically used canned goods. There are references in sources to canned cheese, fruit, meat, oysters, and sardines. By the time Marcy wrote his 1859 guide, canned foods were increasingly available but remained expensive. Canning also added weight to a wagon. Rather than canned vegetables, Marcy suggested that travelers take dried vegetables, which had been used in the Crimean War and by the U.S. Army.

Some pioneers took eggs and butter packed in barrels of flour, and some took dairy cows along the trail. Hunting provided another source of food along the trail; pioneers hunted American bison as well as pronghorn antelope, deer, bighorn sheep, and wildfowl. From rivers and lakes, emigrants also fished for catfish and trout. When emigrants faced starvation, they would sometimes slaughter their animals (horses, mules, and oxen). In desperate times, migrants would search for less-popular sources of food, including coyote, fox, jackrabbit, marmot, prairie dog, and rattlesnake (nicknamed "bush fish" in the later period).

At the time, scurvy was well-recognized, but there was a lack of clear understanding of how to prevent the disease. Nevertheless, pioneers' consumption of the wild berries (including chokeberry, gooseberry, and serviceberry) and currants that grew along the trail (particularly along the Platte River) helped make scurvy infrequent. Marcy's guide correctly suggested that the consumption of wild grapes, greens, and onions could help prevent the disease and that if vegetables were not available, citric acid could be drunk with sugar and water.

Mostly middle-class emigrant families prided themselves on preparing a good table. Although operating Dutch ovens and kneading dough was difficult on the trail, many baked good bread and even pies.

For fuel to heat food, travelers would collect cedar wood, cottonwood, or willow wood, when available, and sometimes dry prairie grass. More frequently, however, travelers relied on "buffalo chips"—dried bison dung—to fuel fires. Buffalo chips resembled rotten wood and would make clear and hot fires. Chips burned quickly, however, and it took up to three bushels of chips to heat a single meal. Collecting buffalo chips was a common task for children and was one chore that even very young children could carry out. As a result, "memoirs written by those who were very young when they made the journey west invariably refer to this aspect of life on the trail."

=== Clothing, equipment, and supplies ===
Tobacco was popular, both for personal use and for trading with natives and other pioneers. Each person brought at least two changes of clothes and multiple pairs of boots (two to three pairs often worn out on the trip). About 25 pounds of soap was recommended for a party of four, for bathing and washing clothes. A washboard and tub were usually brought for washing clothes. Wash days typically occur once or twice a month, or less, depending on the availability of good grass, water, and fuel.

Most wagons carried tents for sleeping, though in good weather most would sleep outside. A thin fold-up mattress, blankets, pillows, canvas, or rubber gutta-percha ground covers were used for sleeping. Sometimes an unfolded feather bed mattress was brought for the wagon if there were pregnant women or very young children along. Storage boxes were ideally the same height, so they could be arranged to give a flat surface inside the wagon for a sleeping platform.

The wagons had no springs, and the ride along the trail was very rough. Despite modern depictions, hardly anyone rode in the wagons; it was too dusty, too rough, and too hard on the livestock.

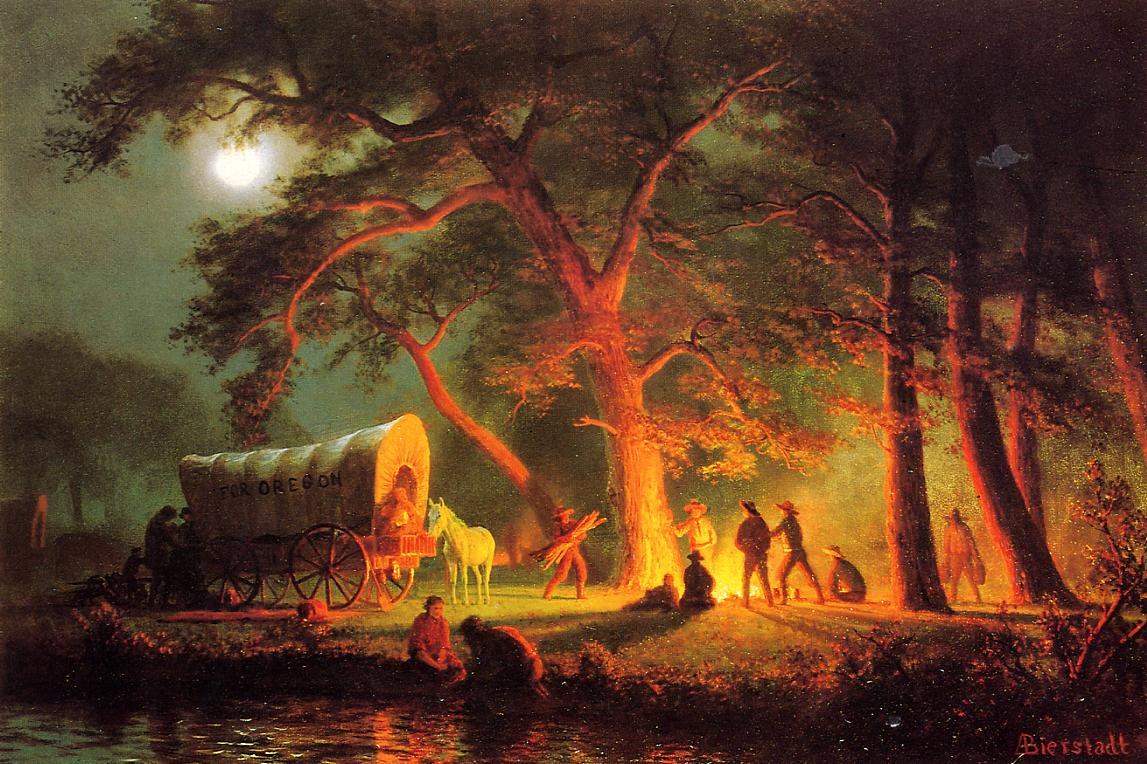
Oregon Trail, painting by Albert Bierstadt, c. 1863

Travelers brought books, Bibles, trail guides, and writing quills, ink, and paper for writing letters or journaling (about one in 200 kept a diary).

A belt and folding knives were carried by nearly all men and boys. Awls, scissors, pins, needles, and thread for mending were required. Spare leather was used for repairing shoes, harnesses, and other equipment. Some used goggles to keep dust out of the eyes.

Saddles, bridles, hobbles, and ropes were needed if the party had a horse or riding mule, and many men did. Extra harnesses and spare wagon parts were often carried. Most carried steel shoes for horses, mules, or livestock. Tar was carried to help repair an ox's injured hoof.

Goods, supplies, and equipment were often shared by fellow travelers. Items that were forgotten, broken, or worn out could be bought from a fellow traveler, post, or fort along the way. New iron shoes for horses, mules, and oxen were put on by blacksmiths found along the way. Equipment repairs and other goods could be procured from blacksmith shops established at some forts and some ferries. Emergency supplies, repairs, and livestock were often provided by residents in California, Oregon, and Utah for late travelers on the trail who were hurrying to beat the snow.

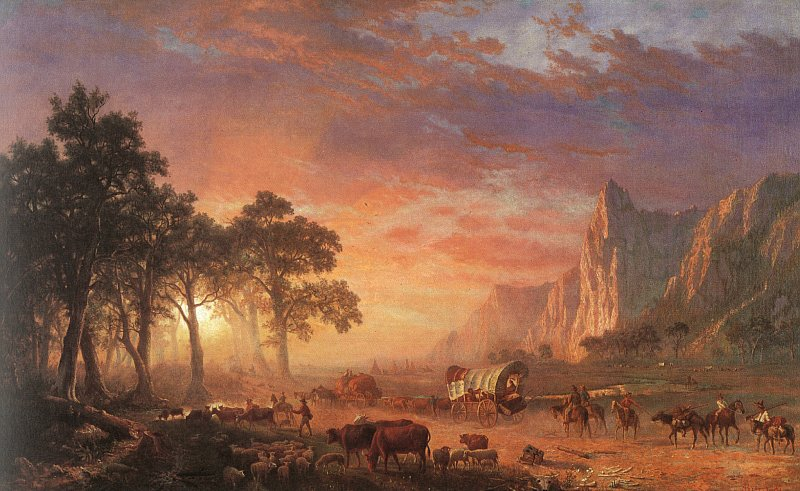
Albert Bierstadt, Oregon Trail, 1869

Non-essential items were often abandoned to lighten the load or in case of emergency. Many travelers would salvage discarded items, picking up essentials or leaving behind their lower-quality items when a better one was found abandoned along the road. Some profited by collecting discarded items, hauling them back to jumping-off places, and reselling them. In the early years, Mormons sent scavenging parties back along the trail to salvage as much iron and other supplies as possible and haul it to Salt Lake City, where supplies of all kinds were needed. Others would use discarded furniture, wagons, and wheels as firewood. During the 1849 gold rush, Fort Laramie was known as "Camp Sacrifice" because of the large amounts of merchandise discarded nearby. Travelers had pushed along the relatively easy path to Fort Laramie with their luxury items but discarded them before the difficult mountain crossing ahead, and after discovering that many items could be purchased at the forts or located for free along the way. Some travelers carried their excess goods to Salt Lake City to be sold.

Professional tools used by blacksmiths, carpenters, and farmers were carried by nearly all. Axes, crowbars, hammers, hatchets, hoes, mallets, mattocks, picks, planes, saws, scythes, and shovels were used to clear or make a road through brush or trees, cut down the banks to cross a wash or steeply banked stream, build a raft or bridge, or repair the wagon. In general, as little road work as possible was done. Travel was often along the top of ridges to avoid the brush and washes common in many valleys.

== Statistics ==
Overall, some 268,000 pioneers used the Oregon Trail and its three primary offshoots, the Bozeman, California, and Mormon Trails, to reach the West Coast, 1840–1860. Another 48,000 headed to Utah. There is no estimate on how many used it to return East.

=== Emigrants ===
Estimated California Oregon Mormon Trail Emigrants
Year	Oregon	California	Utah	Total
1834–39	20	−	−	20
1840	13	−	−	13
1841	24	34	−	58
1842	125	−	−	125
1843	875	38	−	913
1844	1,475	53	−	1,528
1845	2,500	260	−	2,760
1846	1,200	1,500	−	2,700
1847	4,000	450	2,200	6,650
1848	1,300	400	2,400	4,100
Total	11,512	2,735	4,600	18,847
1849	450	25,000	1,500	26,950
1850	6,000	44,000	2,500	52,500
1851	3,600	1,100	1,500	6,200
1852	10,000	50,000	10,000	70,000
1853	7,500	20,000	8,000	35,500
1854	6,000	12,000	3,200	21,200
1855	500	1,500	4,700	6,700
1856	1,000	8,000	2,400	11,400
1857	1,500	4,000	1,300	6,800
1858	1,500	6,000	150	7,650
1859	2,000	17,000	1,400	20,400
1860	1,500	9,000	1,600	12,100
Total	53,000	200,300	43,000	296,300
1834–60	Oregon	California	Utah	Total
1861	−	−	3,148	5,000
1862	−	−	5,244	5,000
1863	−	−	4,760	10,000
1864	−	−	2,626	10,000
1865	−	−	690	20,000
1866	−	−	3,299	25,000
1867	−	−	700	25,000
1868	−	−	4,285	25,000
Total	80,000	250,000	70,000	400,000
1834–67	Oregon	California	Utah	Total

Some of the trail statistics for the early years were recorded by the U.S. Army at Fort Laramie, Wyoming, from about 1849 to 1855. None of these original statistical records have been found—the Army either lost them or destroyed them. Only some partial written copies of the Army records and notes recorded in several diaries have survived.

Emigration to California spiked considerably with the 1849 gold rush. Following the discovery of gold, California remained the destination of choice for most emigrants on the trail up to 1860, with almost 200,000 people traveling there between 1849 and 1860.

Travel diminished after 1860, as the Civil War caused considerable disruptions on the trail. Many of the people on the trail in 1861–1863 were fleeing the war and its attendant drafts in both the South and the North. Trail historian Merrill J. Mattes has estimated the number of emigrants for 1861–1867 given in the total column of the above table. But these estimates may well be low since they only amount to an extra 125,000 people, and the 1870 census shows that over 200,000 additional people (ignoring most of the population increase in California, which had excellent sea and rail connections across Panama by then) showed up in all the states served by the Bozeman, California, Mormon, and Oregon Trails and their offshoots.

Mormon emigration records after 1860 are reasonably accurate, as newspapers and other accounts in Salt Lake City give most of the names of emigrants arriving each year from 1847 to 1868. Gold and silver strikes in Colorado, Idaho, Montana, Nevada, and Oregon caused a considerable increase in people using the trails, often in directions different from the original trail users.

Though the numbers are significant in the context of the times, far more people chose to remain at home in the 31 states. Between 1840 and 1860, the population of the United States rose by 14 million, yet only about 300,000 decided to make the trip. Many were discouraged by the cost, effort, and danger of the trip. Western scout Kit Carson is thought to have said, "The cowards never started and the weak died on the way", though the general saying was written by Joaquin Miller, in reference to the California gold rush. According to several sources, 3 to 10 percent of the emigrants are estimated to have perished on the way west.

Many who went were between the ages of 12 and 24. Between 1860 and 1870, the U.S. population increased by seven million; about 350,000 of this increase was in the Western states.

=== Western census data ===
Census Population of western States
State	1860	1870	Difference
California	379,994	560,247	180,253
Nevada	6,857	42,491	35,634
Oregon	52,465	90,923	38,458
Colorado	34,277	39,684	5,407
Idaho	−	14,990	14,990
Montana	−	20,595	20,595
Utah	40,273	86,789	46,516
Washington	11,594	23,955	12,361
Wyoming	−	9,118	9,118
Totals	525,460	888,792	363,332

These census numbers show a 363,000 population increase in the western states and territories between 1860 and 1870. Some of this increase is because of a high birth rate in the western states and territories, but most is from emigrants moving from the east to the west and new immigration from Europe. Much of the increase in California and Oregon was from emigration by ship, as there was fast and reasonably low-cost transportation via East and West Coast steamships and the Panama Railroad after 1855. The census numbers imply at least 200,000 emigrants (or more) used some variation of the California/Oregon/Mormon/Bozeman Trails to get to their new homes between 1860 and 1870.

=== Costs ===
The cost of traveling over the Oregon Trail and its extensions varied from nothing to a few hundred dollars per person. Women seldom went alone. The cheapest way was to hire one to help drive the wagons or herds, allowing one to make the trip for nearly nothing or even make a small profit. Those with capital could often buy livestock in the Midwest and drive the stock to California or Oregon for profit. About 60 to 80 percent of the travelers were farmers and as such already owned a wagon, livestock team, and many of the necessary supplies. This lowered the cost of the trip to about $50 per person for food and other items. Families planned the trip for months and made much of the extra clothing and many other items needed. Individuals buying most of the needed items would end up spending between $150–200 per person. As the trail matured, additional costs for ferries and toll roads were thought to have been about $30 per wagon.

=== Deaths ===
Oregon-California-Mormon Trail Deaths
Cause	Estimated deaths
Disease	6,000–12,500
Battling with Native Americans	3,000–4,500
Freezing	300–500
Scurvy	300–500
Run overs	200–500
Drownings	200–500
Shootings	200–500
Miscellaneous	200–500
Totals	10,400–20,000

The route west was arduous and fraught with many dangers, but the number of deaths on the trail is not known with any precision; there are only widely varying estimates. Estimating is difficult because of the common practice of burying people in unmarked graves that were intentionally disguised to avoid being dug up by animals or natives. Graves were often put in the middle of a trail and then run over by the livestock to make them difficult to find. Disease was the main killer of trail travelers. Cholera killed up to 3 percent of all travelers in the epidemic years from 1849 to 1855.

Native attacks increased significantly after 1860, when most of the army troops were withdrawn, and miners and ranchers began fanning out all over the country, often encroaching on Native American territory. Increased attacks along the Humboldt led to most travelers taking the Central Nevada Route. The Goodall cutoff, developed in Idaho in 1862, kept Oregon-bound travelers away from much of the native trouble nearer the Snake River. Other trails were developed that traveled further along the South Platte to avoid local Native American hot spots.

Other common causes of death included hypothermia, drowning in river crossings, getting run over by wagons, and accidental gun deaths. Later, more family groups started traveling, and many more bridges and ferries were being put in, so fording a dangerous river became much less common and dangerous. Surprisingly few people were taught to swim in this era. Being run over was a major cause of death, despite the wagons' only averaging 2–3 miles per hour.

The wagons could not easily be stopped, and people, particularly children, were often trying to get on and off the wagons while they were moving—not always successfully. Another hazard was a dress getting caught in the wheels and pulling the person under. Accidental shootings declined significantly after Fort Laramie, as people became more familiar with their weapons and often just left them in their wagons. Carrying around a ten-pound rifle all day soon became tedious and usually unnecessary, as the perceived threat of natives faded and hunting opportunities receded.

A significant number of travelers were suffering from scurvy by the end of their trips. Their typical flour and salted pork/bacon diet had very little vitamin C in it. The diet in the mining camps was also typically low in fresh vegetables and fruit, which indirectly led to the early deaths of many of the inhabitants. Some believe that scurvy deaths may have rivaled cholera as a killer, with most deaths occurring after the victim reached California.

Miscellaneous deaths included deaths by childbirth, falling trees, flash floods, homicides, kicks by animals, lightning strikes, snake bites, and stampedes. According to an evaluation by John Unruh, a 4 percent death rate or 16,000 out of 400,000 total pioneers on all trails may have died on the trail.

Reaching the Sierra Nevada before the start of the winter storms was critical for the successful completion of a trip. The most famous failure in that regard was that of the Donner Party, whose members struggled to traverse what is today called Donner Pass, in November 1846. When the last survivor was rescued in April 1847, 33 men, women, and children had died at Donner Lake; with some of the 48 survivors confessing to having resorted to cannibalism to survive.

=== Disease ===
Disease was the biggest killer on the Oregon Trail. Cholera was responsible for taking many lives. As a fecal-oral disease, it commonly resulted from consuming food or water contaminated by the bacterium. Because a dead traveler would often be buried at the site of death, nearby streams could easily be contaminated by the dead body. Other common diseases along the trail included dysentery, an intestinal infection that causes diarrhea containing blood or mucus, and typhoid fever, another fecal-oral disease.

Airborne diseases commonly affect travelers. One such disease was diphtheria, to which young children were particularly susceptible. It could spread quickly in close quarters, such as the parties that traveled the trail. Measles was also a difficulty, as it is highly contagious and can have an incubation period of ten days or longer. Diseases could spread particularly quickly because settlers had no place to quarantine the sick and because poor sanitation was typical along the route.

== Other trails west ==
There were other possible migration paths for early settlers, miners, or travelers to California or Oregon besides the Oregon trail before the establishment of the transcontinental railroads.

From 1821 to 1846, the Hudson's Bay Company twice annually used the York Factory Express overland trade route from Fort Vancouver to Hudson Bay and then on to London. James Sinclair led a large party of nearly 200 settlers from the Red River Colony in 1841. These northern routes were largely abandoned after Britain ceded its claim to the southern Columbia River basin by way of the Oregon Treaty of 1846.

The longest trip was the voyage of about 13,600 to 15,000 miles (21,900 to 24,100 km) on an uncomfortable sailing ship rounding the treacherous, cold, and dangerous Cape Horn between Antarctica and South America and then sailing on to California or Oregon. This trip typically took four to seven months (120 to 210 days) and cost about $350 to $500. The cost could be reduced to zero if you signed on as a crewman and worked as a common seaman. The hundreds of abandoned ships, whose crews had deserted in San Francisco Bay in 1849–50, showed many thousands chose to do this.

Other routes involved taking a ship to Colón, Panama (then called Aspinwall) and a strenuous, disease-ridden, five- to seven-day trip by canoe and mule over the Isthmus of Panama before catching a ship from Panama City, Panama to Oregon or California. This trip could be done from the East Coast theoretically in less than two months if all ship connections were made without waits and typically cost about $450/person. Catching a fatal disease was a distinct possibility as Ulysses S. Grant in 1852 learned when his unit of about 600 soldiers and some of their dependents traversed the Isthmus and lost about 120 men, women, and children.

This passage was considerably sped up and made safer in 1855 when the Panama Railroad was completed at terrible cost in money and life across the Isthmus. The once treacherous 50-mile (80 km) trip could be done in less than a day. The time and the cost for transit dropped as regular paddle wheel steamships and sailing ships went from ports on the east coast and New Orleans, Louisiana, to Colón, Panama ($80–100), across the Isthmus of Panama by railroad ($25) and by paddle wheel steamships and sailing ships to ports in California and Oregon ($100–150).

Another route was established by Cornelius Vanderbilt across Nicaragua in 1849. The 120-mile (190 km) long San Juan River to the Atlantic Ocean helps drain the 100-mile (160 km) long Lake Nicaragua. From the western shore of Lake Nicaragua, it is only about 12 miles (19 km) to the Pacific Ocean. Vanderbilt decided to use paddle wheel steamships from the U.S. to the San Juan River, small paddle wheel steam launches on the San Juan River, boats across Lake Nicaragua, and a stagecoach to the Pacific where connections could be made with another ship headed to California, Oregon, etc. Vanderbilt, by undercutting fares to the Isthmus of Panama and stealing many of the Panama Railroad workers, managed to attract roughly 30% of the California-bound steamboat traffic. All his connections in Nicaragua were never completely worked out before the Panama Railroad's completion in 1855. Civil strife in Nicaragua and payment to Cornelius Vanderbilt of a "non-compete" payment (bribe) of $56,000 per year killed the whole project in 1855.

Another possible route consisted of taking a ship to Mexico traversing the country and then catching another ship out of Acapulco, Mexico to California, etc. This route was used by some adventurous travelers but was not too popular because of the difficulties of making connections and the often hostile population along the way.

The Gila Trail going along the Gila River in Arizona, across the Colorado River and then across the Sonora Desert in California was scouted by Stephen Kearny's troops and later by Captain Philip St. George Cooke's Mormon Battalion in 1846 who were the first to take a wagon the whole way. This route was used by many gold miners in 1849 and later suffered from the disadvantage that you had to find a way across the very wide and very dry Sonora Desert. It was used by many in 1849 and later as a winter crossing to California, despite its many disadvantages.

From 1857 to 1861, the Butterfield Stage Line won the $600,000/yr. U.S. mail contract to deliver mail to San Francisco, California. As dictated by southern Congressional members, the 2,800-mile (4,500 km) route ran from St. Louis, Missouri through Arkansas, Oklahoma Indian Territory, Texas, New Mexico Territory, and across the Sonora Desert before ending in San Francisco, California. Employing over 800 at its peak, it used 250 Concord Stagecoaches seating 12 very crowded passengers in three rows. It used 1,800 heads of stock, horses, and mules and 139 relay stations to ensure the stages ran day and night. A one-way fare of $200 delivered a very thrashed and tired passenger into San Francisco in 25 to 28 days. After traveling the route, New York Herald reporter Waterman Ormsby said, "I now know what Hell is like. I've just had 24 days of it."

The ultimate competitor arrived in 1869, the first transcontinental railroad, which cut travel time to about seven days at a low fare of about $60 (economy)

== Legacy ==
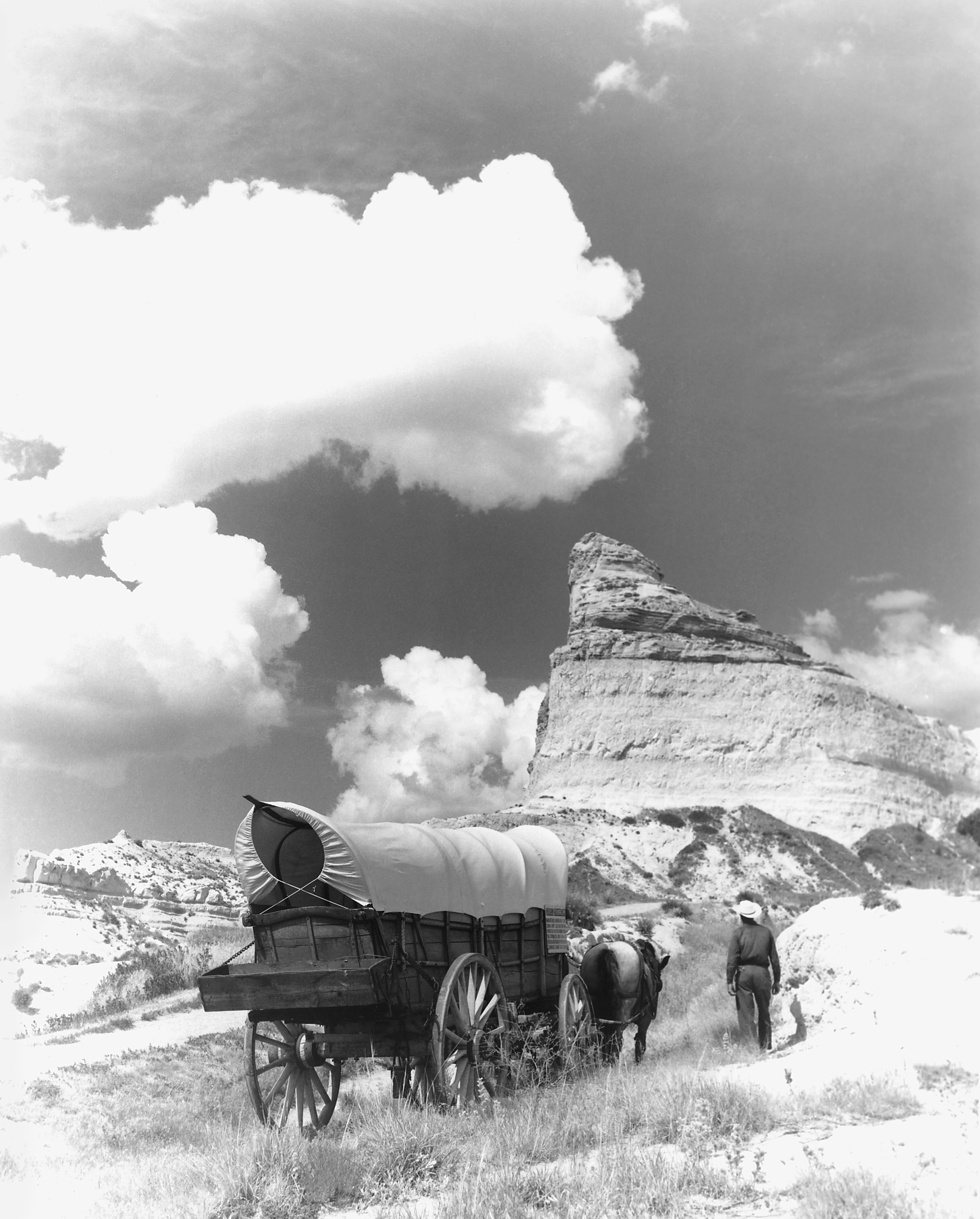
An Oregon Trail reenactment at Scotts Bluff

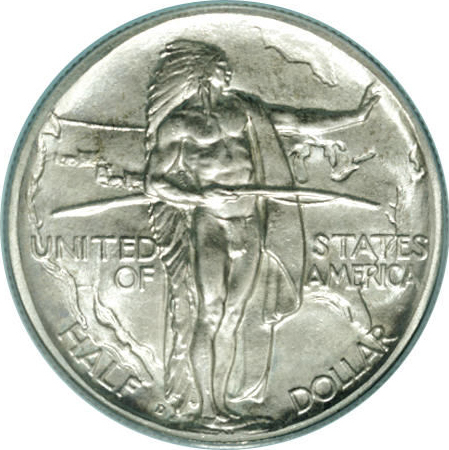
The obverse of a 1939 Oregon Trail Memorial half dollar

One of the legacies of the Oregon Trail was the expansion of the United States territory to the West Coast. In the 1800s, many thousands of settlers traveled to Oregon and California over this route.

=== Arts, entertainment, and media ===
The western expansion, and the Oregon Trail in particular, inspired numerous creative works about the settlers' experiences.

==== Commemorative coin ====
The Oregon Trail Memorial half dollar was coined to commemorate the route. Issued intermittently between 1926 and 1939, 202,928 were sold to the public. With 131,050 minted in 1926, that year's issue remains readily available for collectors.

==== Music ====
The Oregon Trail has featured in various songs, especially in western music genres.

"The Oregon Trail" is a song written by Peter DeRose and Billy Hill, recorded by singing cowboy artist Tex Ritter in 1935, and by Australian country musician Tex Morton in 1936.

Woody Guthrie wrote and recorded a song entitled "Oregon Trail" while traveling in the region in 1941. It was the opening track in his Columbia River Collection album.

==== Games ====
The story of the Oregon Trail inspired the educational video game series The Oregon Trail, which became widely popular in the 1980s and early 1990s.

In 2014, a musical named The Trail to Oregon!, based on The Oregon Trail game, with music and lyrics by Jeff Blim and a book by Jeff Blim, Nick Lang and Matt Lang was performed in Chicago and later posted to YouTube by StarKid Productions.

==== Television ====
The Oregon Trail was a television series that ran from September 22 to October 26, 1977, on NBC. The show stars Rod Taylor, Tony Becker, Darleen Carr, Charles Napier, and Ken Swofford. Although the show was canceled after six episodes, the remaining seven episodes were later aired on BBC 2 in the United Kingdom. The entire series was shown in the UK on BBC1, from November 1977 to January 1978. In April 2010, Timeless Media Group (TMG) released in the USA the entire show on six DVDs, running 750 minutes. The set includes 14 original episodes, including the feature-length pilot and the six episodes that did not air on NBC.

The episode of Teen Titans Go! titled "Oregon Trail" parodies expeditions that took place on the Oregon Trail, as well as the 1985 video game The Oregon Trail.

The 2021 prequel to Yellowstone titled 1883 follows the Dutton family’s journey on The Oregon Trail from Texas to Montana.

==== Film ====
The 1930 Western film The Big Trail featured John Wayne in his first starring role as a fur trapper leading a large wagon train of settlers across the Oregon Trail.

The 1959 Western film The Oregon Trail featured Fred MacMurray as a disguised soldier who used the trail to head to the Pacific Northwest in case of war.

The 1967 film The Way West, starring Kirk Douglas, Robert Mitchum, and Richard Widmark, was based on the novel of the same name by A. B. Guthrie, Jr. It follows a wagon train of settlers as they make their way from Missouri to Oregon in 1843.

The 2020 animated film Calamity, a Childhood of Martha Jane Cannary portrays the expedition of a dozen wagons to Oregon, part of which was the young Calamity Jane.

== See also ==
- Cowlitz Trail
- Kansas Territory
- Landmarks of the Nebraska Territory
- National Historic Oregon Trail Interpretive Center
- National Historic Trails Interpretive Center
- The Oregon Trail: Sketches of Prairie and Rocky-Mountain Life
- Route of the Oregon Trail
- Trailside Center
- The West as America Art Exhibition

== Bibliography ==
=== Primary sources ===
- Crawford, Medorem (1897). Journal of Medorem Crawford: an account of his trip across the plains with the Oregon pioneers of 1842 (PDF). Star Job Office. OCLC 5001642.
- Hewitt, Randall (1863). Notes by the way: memoranda of a journey across the plains, from Dundee, Ill., to Olympia, W. T. May 7, to November 3, 1862 (PDF). Washington Standard. OCLC 51465106.
- Myres, Sandra L., ed. (1980). Ho for California! women's overland diaries from the Huntington Library. San Marino, Cal: Hungtington Library. ISBN 978-0-87328-103-4.
- Parkman, Francis (1849). The Oregon Trail: Sketches of Prairie and Rocky-Mountain Life. New York: G.P. Putnam's. OCLC 657133303., personal account by a famous historian
- Smedley, William (1916). Across the Plains in '62 (PDF). Denver: [publisher not identified]. OCLC 4981167.
- Ward, D. B. (1911). Across the Plains in 1853 (PDF). Preface by Edmond S. Meany. Seattle: Ward. OCLC 466904274.
- Williams, Joseph (1921). Narrative of a Tour from the State of Indiana to the Oregon Territory in the Years 1841–2 (PDF). Introduction by James C. Bell, Jr. New York: E. Eberstadt. OCLC 2095243.

=== Secondary sources ===
- Bagley, Will (2010). So rugged and mountainous: blazing the trails to Oregon and California, 1812-1848. Overland West. Vol. 1. Norman: University of Oklahoma Press. ISBN 978-0-8061-4103-9. The first book is a projected four-volume study of the course and impact of Western migration.
- Dary, David (2004). The Oregon Trail: an American saga. New York: Alfred A. Knopf. ISBN 978-0-375-41399-5. A one-volume history of the Oregon Trail.
- Faragher, John Mack (2001). Women and men on the overland trail. Yale Nota Bene (2nd ed.). New Haven: Yale University Press. ISBN 978-0-300-08924-0.
- Federal Writers' Project, ed. (1972). The Oregon trail: the Missouri River to the Pacific Ocean. American guide series. St. Clair Shores, Mich: Scholarly Press. ISBN 978-0-403-01290-9. OCLC 214868.
- Hanson, T. J. (2001). Western Passage. Ashland, OH: Bookmasters, Inc. ISBN 978-0-9705847-0-0.
- Peters, Arthur King (1996). Seven trails West. New York: Abbeville Press. ISBN 978-1-55859-782-2.
- Unruh, John D. (1979). The plains across: the overland emigrants and the Trans-Mississippi West, 1840-60. Urbana, Ill.: University of Illinois Press. ISBN 978-0-252-00698-2. The standard scholarly history.
