= Donner Party timeline =

The following timeline provides an almost day-to-day basic description of events directly associated with the 1846 Donner Party pioneers, covering the journey from Illinois to California—2,500 miles (4,000 kilometers), over the Great Plains, two mountain ranges, and the deserts of the Great Basin.

Following the timeline is a chronological list of deaths.

== Timeline ==
Plaque commemorating Donner Party in Springfield, Illinois. Placed by the Children of the American Revolution.

- April 15, 1846: The journey begins in Springfield, Illinois. The travelers are George Donner, his brother Jacob, and James F. Reed, with their families. Each man has three covered wagons and has hired teamsters to drive the oxen that pull them; Reed also has two servants, who are Eliza and Baylis Williams. The destination of the first leg is Independence, where the Oregon Trail begins; the distance from Springfield to Independence is about 250 miles (400 kilometers). The trip is timed to begin when the spring rains have subsided and grass for the draft animals is available, and to get there before the snow makes the Sierra Nevada impassable.

=== May 1846 ===
- May 10, 1846: The Donners and Reeds arrive at Independence, Missouri, where they spend the next two days completing their outfits for the journey.

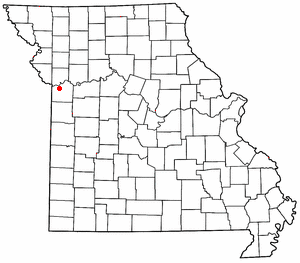
location of Independence Missouri, where the Donners and Reeds arrived on May 10, 1846

- May 12, 1846: The Donners and Reeds depart Independence, Missouri for California.
- May 19, 1846: At Indian Creek, about 100 miles (160 kilometers) west of Independence, the Donners and Reeds join a larger wagon train, which is led by Colonel William Henry Russell.
- May 27, 1846: High water stops the Russell Train at the east bank of the Big Blue River in modern-day Kansas. The emigrants build a raft to carry their wagons across.
- May 29, 1846: While the emigrants are camped, Mrs. Reed's mother, Sarah Keyes, dies of tuberculosis and is buried under a tree near Alcove Spring in modern-day Kansas.
- May 31, 1846: The last of the wagons are ferried across the river. At some point during the delay at the Big Blue, the Murphy family from Tennessee has joined the wagon train.

=== June 1846 ===
- June 16, 1846: Tamsen Donner, George's wife, writes that they are now at the Platte River, 200 miles (320 km) from Fort Laramie, in present-day Wyoming, and that the journey so far has been easier than expected.
- June 18, 1846: William Russell relinquishes his position as captain of the wagon train because he, Edwin Bryant, and others have decided to trade in their wagons and teams for mules in order to travel more quickly. They travel ahead to Fort Laramie to make the transaction.
- June 27, 1846: The party in which the Donners and Reeds travel, now called the Boggs Company (named for its leader Lilburn W. Boggs, a former governor of Missouri), arrives at Fort Laramie. James Reed meets James Clyman, an old mountaineer, who has just come by horse from California with Lansford Hastings by way of a new route, which will soon be known as Hastings Cutoff. Clyman urges the emigrants to avoid Hastings Cutoff and take the regular route instead.

=== July 1846 ===
- July 4, 1846: The Boggs Company celebrates the Fourth of July at Fort Laramie
- July 17, 1846: At Independence Rock the Boggs Company encounters a lone eastbound rider bearing an open letter from Hastings urging "all emigrants now on the road" to meet him at Fort Bridger, so he can guide them on his cutoff.
- July 18, 1846: The Boggs Company crosses the Continental Divide. They are 1,000 miles (1,600 kilometers) from Independence and have more than 1,000 miles (1,600 km) to go.
- July 19, 1846: The Boggs Company reaches the Little Sandy River, where several other wagon trains have also camped. Here those emigrants who have decided to take Hastings's route form a new company and elect George Donner captain, thus creating the Donner Party.
- July 20, 1846: The Donner Party separates from the other wagon trains and takes the left-hand road to Fort Bridger.
- July 27, 1846: The Donner Party arrives at Fort Bridger, the corral and two cabins of mountaineer Jim Bridger. There the Donner Party learns that Hastings left the previous week leading the wagons that had already arrived and leaving instructions for later groups to follow him. The Donner Party stays four days to rest their oxen and make repairs.
- July 31, 1846: James Reed writes "Hastings Cutoff is said to be a saving of 350 or 400 miles (640 km) and a better route. The rest of the Californians went the long route, feeling afraid of Hastings' cutoff. But Mr. Bridger informs me that it is a fine, level road with plenty of water and grass. It is estimated that 700 miles (1,100 km) will take us to Captain Sutter's fort, which we hope to make in seven weeks from this day." At the fort the emigrants take on some new members. Now numbering 74 people, the Donner Party leaves Fort Bridger and starts out on Hastings Cutoff.

=== August 1846 ===
- August 1–5, 1846: The Donner Party makes good time following the tracks of the group led by Hastings.
- August 6, 1846: The Donner Party stops near the mouth of Echo Canyon on the Weber River, present day Henefer, Utah. The Weber River flows on down to the mouth of Weber Canyon at Ogden, Utah; Hastings has left a note for them, warning them that the road ahead is impassable and instructing them to send someone ahead to get instructions. James Reed and two others set out following the wagon tracks of Hastings's group.
- August 10, 1846: Reed returns to the wagons. Hastings had accompanied Reed partway back; the men ascended a peak where Hastings pointed out an alternative route, then they separated, Reed blazing a rough trail to his wagon train.
- August 11, 1846: The Donner Party sets out on the new route, but are slowed by the necessity of chopping a road through the brush and trees of the Wasatch Mountains. The Graves family catches up with them; the company now numbers 87 people in 23 wagons.

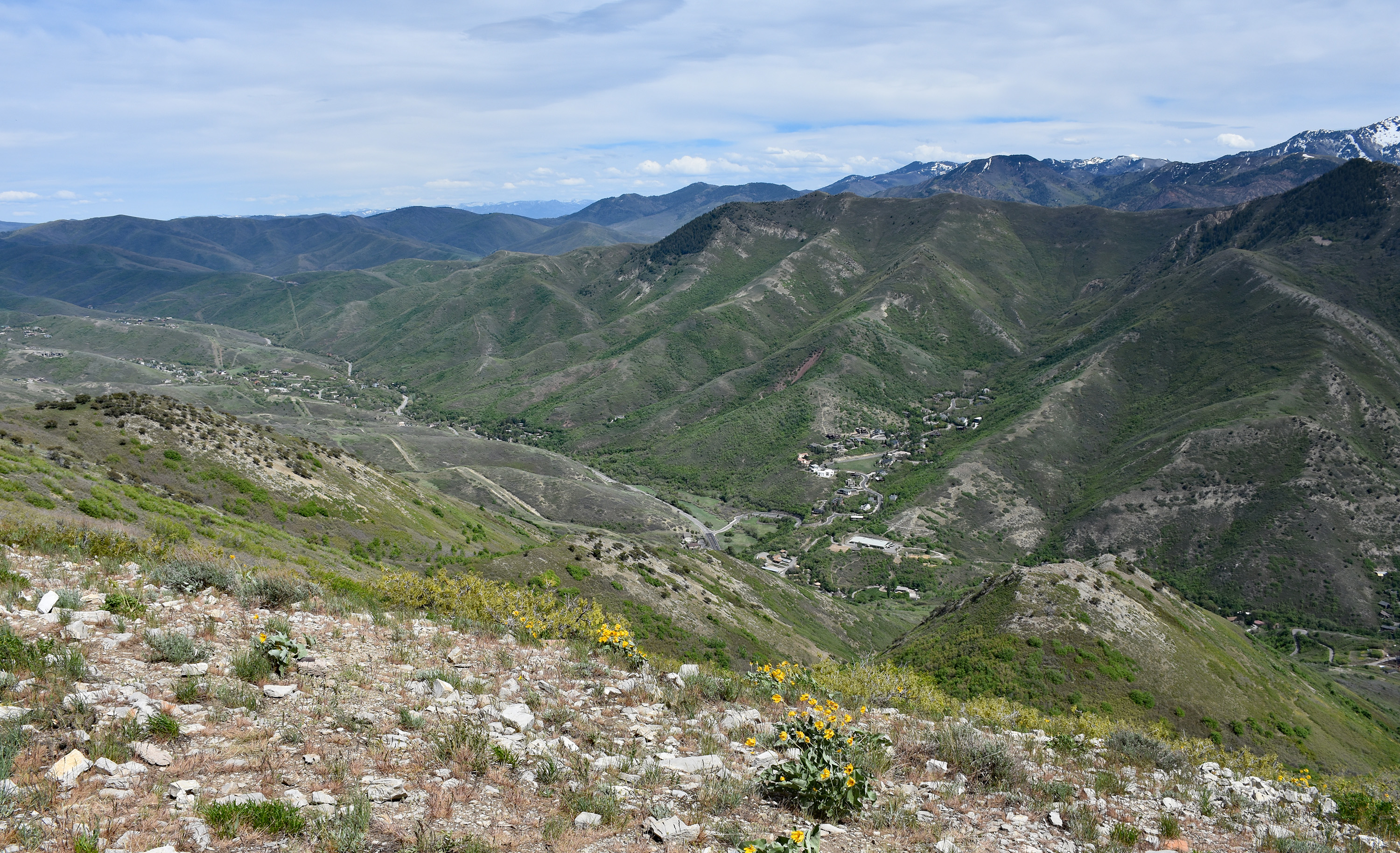
Emigration Canyon cuts through the Wasatch Mountains

- August 22, 1846: The Donner Party enters the Salt Lake Valley via what will be known as Emigration Canyon having departed the Weber River using East Canyon. With just a month of summer remaining, there are still 600 miles (970 kilometers) to go.
- August 25, 1846: In the evening, Luke Halloran dies of tuberculosis; he is buried in a coffin at a fork in the road the following day. About this time the emigrants find another note from Hastings, warning them of a two-day dry drive ahead. They set out again, following the tracks of the emigrants ahead of them.
- August 29, 1846: The emigrants stay in camp collecting as much water and grass as possible for the drive ahead.
- August 30, 1846: The Donner Party reaches Redlum Spring, the last source of water before the dry drive begins, then sets out to cross the Great Salt Lake Desert.

=== September 1846 ===
- September 3, 1846: On the third day in the desert, the water runs out. That night, the Reeds' thirsty oxen run off, never to be found; the Reeds take a few things and set out on foot.
- September 8, 1846: The emigrants finish the five-day journey across the eighty-mile desert, which Hastings had said was half as wide. They have lost 36 head of cattle, half of them Reed's, and four wagons have to be abandoned. They spend the next week at the foot of Pilot Peak recuperating from their ordeal, hunting for cattle, and caching their possessions.
- September 10, 1846: The Donner Party sets out again. After taking an inventory of their supplies, the emigrants have realized that they don't have enough food to get them to California and have sent Charles Stanton and William McCutchen ahead to Sutter's Fort to request more.
- September 26, 1846: The party arrives at the Humboldt River, where the cutoff meets the standard trail, which is actually 125 miles (201 kilometers) shorter than Hastings Cutoff. Two Native Americans join the party for a while and are fed. They were thought to have stolen one of Mr. Graves' shirts one night.

=== October 1846 ===
- October 5, 1846: While struggling up a sandy hill at Iron Point, Nevada, the Reed and Graves teams become entangled. A fight breaks out between Milt Elliott, Reed's teamster, and John Snyder, driving the Graves wagon. When Reed intervenes with his knife to cut the teams, Snyder grows angrier and hits Reed on the head with his whip handle; the handle breaks into Reed's skull and causes bleeding. With Snyder about to strike again, Reed stabs him in the chest with his hunting knife. Snyder stumbles some feet up the hill and dies. Louis Keseberg once suggested to hang Reed, but the emigrants decide to banish Reed, who at first refuses to leave but then agrees.
- October 6, 1846: Reed heads west. The following day he overtakes the Donners, who have moved ahead of the rest of the party. One of Reed's teamsters, Walter Herron, has been traveling with the Donners; he decides to accompany Reed to California. Knowing that time is running out, the emigrants travel as quickly as possible along the Humboldt River.
- October 7, 1846: Louis Keseberg turns Mr. Hardkoop, an elderly Belgian traveling with him, out of his wagon to lighten the load. Everyone who can is walking. Hardkoop gives out, but nobody can take him in. He is last seen sitting by the road.
- About October 11, 1846: At night, Paiute Indians kill 21 of the Donner Party's oxen. Shortly thereafter the Indians steal another 18 oxen and wound several others. More than 100 of the party's cattle are now gone.
- About October 13, 1846: Since the Indians have killed almost all his cattle, a German emigrant named Wolfinger stops at the Humboldt Sink to cache his wagon. Two men, Joseph Reinhardt and Augustus Spitzer, stay behind to help but return without him, saying that he has been killed by Indians. Reinhardt later confesses to having killed Wolfinger.
- About October 16, 1846: The Donner Party arrives at the Truckee River, which will lead them into the Sierra Nevada.
- October 1846: John Breen later recalled of this time, "The weather was already very cold and the heavy clouds hanging over the mountains to the west were strong indications of an approaching winter. Some wanted to stop and rest their cattle. Others, in fear of the snow, were in favor of pushing ahead as fast as possible."
- About October 25, 1846: The emigrants' food is almost depleted when Charles Stanton returns from Sutter's Fort; he brings seven mules loaded with provisions and two Native American guides (Luis and Salvador), plus the news that the pass through the Sierras should be open for another month. William McCutchen, who had accompanied him to California, is ill and remains at Sutter's Fort.
- October 28, 1846: James Reed arrives at Sutter's Fort.
- October 30, 1846: William Foster accidentally shoots his brother-in-law William Pike, who dies a short time later. Snow falls during his burial in Truckee Canyon. About this date, Reed and McCutchen get horses and supplies from Sutter and head back into the mountains after their families. They meet deep snow and are unable to continue, so they cache the provisions and return to the fort to await another opportunity.
- October 31, 1846: The front axle of George Donner's family wagon breaks; while making a new one, George cuts his hand badly. George and Jacob's group lags behind while the rest of the party moves on.

=== November 1846 ===
- Early November 1846: Patrick Breen wrote of this time, "We pushed on as fast as our failing cattle could haul our almost empty wagons. At last we reached the foot of the main ridge near Truckee [now Donner] Lake. It was sundown. The weather was clear, but a large circle around the moon indicated an approaching storm." The emigrants spend the night at the lake, 1,000 feet (300 m) below the summit; during the night, it begins snowing on the summit.
- Early November 1846: In the morning, the emigrants try to make it over the pass, but the snow is already five feet (1.5 m) deep. Stanton and one of the two Indian guides do reach the summit, but turn back; the others are too exhausted to push on. Night finds the emigrants huddled against the mountain in a windy storm of snow and sleet. The next day, temporarily defeated, they return to the eastern end of the lake. They have traveled 2,500 miles (4,000 kilometers) and are only 150 miles (240 kilometers) from Sutter's Fort. The Donners, held up by the accident, are still behind.
- November 6, 1846: At Sutter's Fort, George McKinstry writes "All things remain quiet here. The weather is bad. I am fearful the snow is too deep for the last company of emigrants to cross the mountains."
- November 1846: The two sections of the Donner Party camp for the winter. Near the lake, the Breen family takes shelter in an abandoned cabin, against which Louis Keseberg builds a lean-to. About 200 yards (180 m) away William Eddy and William Foster build a cabin against a boulder for the Eddys, Fosters, Murphys, and Pikes. The Graves and Reed families occupy two sides of a double cabin about half a mile away from the other two. About six miles (9.7 km) back, on Alder Creek, the two Donner families set up a tent apiece; the single men accompanying them construct a brush shelter.
- November 20, 1846: Patrick Breen begins keeping a diary: "Came to this place on the 31st of last month that it snowed. We went on to the pass, the snow so deep we were unable to find the road, when within 3 miles (4.8 km) of the summit, then turned back to this shanty on the Lake... We now have killed most part of our cattle, having to stay here until next spring & live on poor beef without bread or salt. It snowed during the space of eight days with little intermission, after our arrival here."
- November 21, 1846: Patrick Breen's diary: "Fine morning. Wind N.W. 22 of our company are about starting across the mountain this morning, including Stanton & his Indians."
- November 22, 1846: Patrick Breen's diary: "Froze hard last night. This a fine, clear morning; wind E.S.E. No account from those on the mountains."
- November 23, 1846: Patrick Breen's diary: "Same weather; wind W. The expedition across the mountains returned after an unsuccessful attempt."
- November 24, 1846: Patrick Breen's diary: "Fine in the morning. Towards evening, Cloudy & windy. Wind W. Looks like snow. Freezeing hard."
- November 25, 1846: Patrick Breen's diary: "Wind about W.N.W. Cloudy. Looks like the eve of a snow storm. Our mountaineers intend trying to cross the Mountain tomorrow if [the weather is] fair. Froze hard last night."
- November 26, 1846: Patrick Breen's diary: "Began to snow yesterday in the evening. Now rains or sleet. The mountaineers don't start to day."
- November 27, 1846: Patrick Breen's diary: "Continues to snow. The ground not covered. Wind W. Dull prospect for crossing the mountains."
- November 28, 1846: Patrick Breen's diary: "Snowing fast now. About 10 o'clock, snow 8 or 10 in [20–25 centimeters] deep. Soft wet snow. Weather not cold. Wind W."
- November 29, 1846: Patrick Breen's diary: "Still snowing. Now about 3 ft [91 centimeters] deep. Wind W. Killed my last oxen today. Will skin them tomorrow. Gave another yoke to Fosters. Hard to get wood."

=== December 1846 ===
- December 3, 1846: Patrick Breen's diary: "Snowed a little last night; bright and cloudy at intervals all night. To day Cloudy; snows none; wind S.W.; warm but not enough so to thaw snow [, which is] lying deep allround. Expecting it to thaw a little to day. The forgoing written in the morning. It immediately turned in to snow & continued to snow all day & likely to do so all night."
- December 5, 1846: Patrick Breen's diary: "Fine, clear day. Beautiful sunshine. Thawing a little. Looks delightful after the long snow storm."
- December 6, 1846: Patrick Breen's diary: "The morning fine & clear. Now some cloudy. Wind S.E. Not much in the sunshine. Stanton & Graves manufacturing snow shoes for another mountain scrabble. No account of mules." The snow shoes are of rawhide and oxbows.
- December 8, 1846: Patrick Breen's diary: "Fine weather; Clear & pleasant. Froze hard last night. Wind S.E. Deep snow. The people not stirring round much. Hard work to wood sufficient to keep us warm & cook our beef."
- December 9, 1846: Patrick Breen's diary: "Commenced snowing about 11 o'clock. Wind N.W. Snows fast. Took in Spitzer yesterday; [he is] so weak that he cannot rise without help, caused by starveation. All in good health. Some having scant supply of beef. Stanton trying to make a raise of some for his Indians & self. Not likely to get much."
- December 10, 1846: Patrick Breen's diary: "Snowed fast all night with heavy squalls of wind. Continues still to snow. The sun peeping through the clouds once in about three hours. Very difficult to get wood today. Now, about 2 o'clock, looks likely to continue snowing. Don't know the depth of the snow; may be 7 feet (2.1 m) [2.1 meters]." On December 18, Patrick Breen will record that it was around this date, December 10, that "Milt. & Noah" went to visit the Donners' separate camp.
- December 13, 1846: Patrick Breen's diary: "Snows faster than any previous day. Wind N.W. Stanton & Graves with several others making preparations to cross the Mountains on snow shoes. Snow 8 feet (2.4 m) deep on the level. Dull."
- December 15, 1846: Baylis Williams, one of the Reeds' hired men, dies, probably of a fever.
- December 16, 1846: Patrick Breen's diary: "Fair & pleasant. Froze hard last night. & the company started on snow shoes to cross the mountains. Wind S.E. Looks pleasant." The "company" is composed of seventeen of the strongest emigrants, with six days' starvation rations each. (Thirty years later this band of snowshoers is dubbed the "Forlorn Hope".)
- December 17, 1846: Charles Burger and young William Murphy are unable to keep up with the snowshoers and return to the camp. Fifteen continue: five young women, nine men, and twelve-year-old Lemuel Murphy. Around this date or the next, the snowshoers get over the summit. Patrick Breen's diary: "Pleasant sunshine today. Wind about S.E. Bill Murp returned from the mountain party last evening. Bealis died night before last. Milt. & Noah went to Donners 8 days since; not returned yet; thinks they got lost in the snow. J Denton here to day."
- December 18, 1846: Patrick Breen's diary: "Beautiful day; sky clear; it would be delightful were it not for the snow lying so deep. Thaws but little on the south side of shanty. Saw no strangers today from any of the shantys."
- December 19, 1846: Patrick Breen's diary: "Snowed last night; commenced about 11 o'clock. Squalls of wind with snow at intervals. This morning, thawing. Wind N. by W. A little singular for a thaw. May continue. It continues to snow. Sun shining. Cleared off towards evening."
- December 20, 1846: The snowshoers reach Yuba Bottoms. Patrick Breen's diary: "Night clear. Froze a little. Now clear & pleasant. Wind N.W. Thawing a little. Mrs Reid here. No account of Milt. Yet Dutch Charley started for Donners; turned back, not able to proceed. Tough times, but not discouraged. Our hopes are in God. Amen." (Patrick Breen misspells "Reed" throughout his diary)
- December 21, 1846: About this date, the snowshoers' rations run out. Charles Stanton, too weak to leave camp in the morning, sits in the snow, smoking his pipe, and tells the rest of the Hope to go on. Patrick Breen's diary: "Milt. got back last night from Donners' camp [with] sad news. Jake Donno [Jacob Donner], Sam Shoemaker, Rinehart, & Smith are dead; the rest of them in a low situation. Snowed all night with a strong S.W. wind. To day Cloudy. Wind continues but not snowing. Thawing sun shining dimly. In hopes it will clear off."
- December 22, 1846: Patrick Breen's diary: "Snowed all last night. Continued to snow all day with some few intermissions. Had a severe fit of the gravel yesterday. I am well to day, Praise be to the God of Heaven."
- December 23, 1846: Patrick Breen's diary: "Snowed a little last night. Clear to day & thawing a little. Milt took some of his meat to day; all well at their camp. Began this day to read the Thirty days prayer. May Almighty God grant the request of an unworthy sinner that I am. Amen."
- December 24, 1846: Patrick Breen's diary: "Rained all night & still continues to rain. Poor prospect for any kind of Comfort, spiritual or temporal. Wind S. May God help us to spend the Christmas as we ought, considering circumstances." Snowshoers: They are lost in the mountains, where it has begun to snow, and have been three days without food. Mary Graves recalled, "What to do we did not know. Some of those who had children and families wished to go back, but the two Indians said they would go on. I told them I would go, too, for to go back and hear the cries of hunger from my brothers and sisters was more than I could stand. I would go as far as I could, let the consequences be what they might." They discuss killing one of their number for food and draw lots. Patrick Dolan loses the draw, but nobody can bear to kill him. Around 11 P.M., the storm blows out the fire. William Eddy gets everyone to sit in a ring, over which the blankets are pulled; the snow covers them. This camp will later be known as "Camp of Death." Antonio, a Mexican teamster, dies, then Franklin Graves in the arms of his daughters Mary and Sarah.
- December 25, 1846: Margret Reed saves some food for Christmas which delights her four children as they eat. Patrick Breen's diary: "Began to snow yesterday about 12 o'clock. Snowed all night & snows yet rapidly. Wind about E. by N. Great difficulty in getting wood. John & Edwd. has to get: I am not able. Offered our prayers to God this Christmas morning. The prospect is appalling; but hope in God. Amen." Snowshoers: At "Camp of Death", Patrick Dolan dies of hypothermia saying it was as "warm as a summer day". Young Lemuel Murphy dies of starvation.
- December 26, 1846: The snowshoers resort to cannibalism, "averting their faces from one another and weeping".
- December 27, 1846: Patrick Breen's diary: "Continues clear. Froze hard last night. Snow very deep: say 9 feet (2.7 m) [2.74 meters]. Thawing a little in the sun. Scarce of wood. To day chopt a tree down. It sinks in the snow & is hard to be got."
- December 29, 1846: Charles Burger dies in Keseberg's lean-to.
- December 30, 1846: About this date, the Forlorn Hope's human meat is gone. William Foster suggests that Luis and Salvador be killed for food; William Eddy disagrees, and tells Foster's idea to the Indians, who initially are incredulous, then vanish into the woods.
- December 31, 1846: Patrick Breen's diary: "Last of the year. May we, with God's help, spend the coming year better than the past, which we purpose to do if Almighty God will deliver us from our present dreadful situation, which is our prayer if the will of God sees it fitting for us. Amen."

=== January 1847 ===
- January 1, 1847: Patrick Breen's diary: "We pray the God of mercy to deliver us from our present Calamity if it be his Holy will. Amen. Commenced snowing last night. Does not snow fast. Wind S.E. Sun peeps out at times. Provisions getting scant. Dug up a hide from under the snow yesterday for Milt. Did not take it yet."
- January 3, 1847: Patrick Breen's diary: "Mrs. Reid talks of crossing the mountains with her children. Provisions scarce."
- January 7, 1847: Snowshoers: About this time, William Eddy kills a deer, but too late to save Jay Fosdick, who dies in the night.
- January 8, 1847: Patrick Breen's diary: "Mrs. Reid & company came back this morning; could not find their way on the other side of the Mountain. They have nothing but hides to live on. Martha is to stay here. Milt. & Eliza going to Donners'. Mrs. Reid & the 2 boys going to their own shanty & Virginia. Prospects Dull. May God relieve us all from this difficulty if it is his Holy will. Amen."
- January 9, 1847: Snowshoers: About this time, the surviving snowshoers come upon Luis and Salvador, lying exhausted and near death. William Foster shoots them, believing their flesh was the rest of the group's last hope of avoiding imminent death from starvation.
- January 10, 1847: The Mexicans lose Los Angeles, California, to the United States Marines. The war in California is essentially over, freeing men and supplies for another rescue attempt.
- January 12, 1847: The snowshoers reach an Indian village, whose inhabitants share their meager supplies, chiefly acorn bread.
- January 17, 1847: Patrick Breen's diary: "Eliza [Williams] came here this morning. Sent her back again to Graves. Lanthrom [Landrum Murphy] crazy last night, so Bill [Murphy] says. Keyburg sent Bill to get hides off his shanty & carry them home this morning. Provisions scarce. Hides are the only article we depend on; we have a little meat yet. May God send us help." Snowshoers: About this date the travelers reach another Indian village. Foster and the five women are too weak to continue.
- January 18, 1847: Patrick Breen's diary: "Fine day. Clear and pleasant. Wind W. Thawing in the sun. Mrs. Murphy here to day. Very hard to get wood." Snowshoers: Eddy gives an Indian a pouch of tobacco to half carry him to the nearest settlement, Johnson's Ranch, several miles away. The settlers are aghast at the sight of the emaciated wreck of a man; they follow his bloody footprints back to the village and bring in his companions.
- January 19, 1847: Patrick Breen's diary: "Clear & pleasant. Thawing a little in the sun. Wind S.W. Peggy & Edward sick last night by eating some meat that Dolan threw his tobacco on; pretty well to day (praise God for his blessings). Lanthrom very low; in danger if relief don't soon come. Hides are all the go; not much of any other in camp."
- January 20, 1847: Patrick Breen's diary: "Fine morning. Wind N. Froze hard last night. Expecting some person across the Mountain this week."
- January 21, 1847: Patrick Breen's diary: "Fine morning. Wind W. Did not freeze quite so hard last night as it has done. John Battice & Denton came this morning with Eliza. She won't eat hides. Mrs Reid sent her back to live or die on them. Milt. got his toes froze. The Donners are all well."
- January 23, 1847: Patrick Breen's diary: "Blew hard & snowed all night. The most severe storm we experienced this winter."
- January 24, 1847: Patrick Breen's diary: "Ceased snowing yesterday about 2 o'clock. Wind about S.E. All in good health. Thanks be to God for his mercies endureth for ever. Heard nothing from Murphys camp since the storm. Expect to hear they suffered some." The infant Louis Keseberg, Jr., dies.
- January 25, 1847: Patrick Breen's diary: "Began to snow yesterday evening & still continues. Wind W."
- January 26, 1847: Patrick Breen's diary: "Cleared up yesterday. To day fine & pleasant. Wind S. In hopes we are done with snow storms. Those that went to Suitor's not yet returned. Provisions getting very scant. People getting weak liveing on short allowance of hides."
- January 27, 1847: Patrick Breen's diary: "Began to Snow yesterday & still continues to sleet. Thawing a little. Wind W. Mrs. Keyber here this morning... Keysburg sick & Lanthrom lying in bed the whole of his time. Don't have fire enough to Cook their hides. Bill & Sim. Murphy sick."
- January 29, 1847: While recuperating, Eddy has dictated a letter which has been carried to John Sinclair, the alcalde (magistrate) of the Sacramento district. Sinclair alerts others in the area and on this day writes a letter to his colleague Washington A. Bartlett, alcalde of San Francisco.
- January 30, 1847: Patrick Breen's diary: "John & Edw went to Graves this morning. The Graves Seized on Mrs Reid's goods until they would be paid. Also took the hides that she & family had to live on. She got two pieces of hides from there, & the balance they have taken. You may know from these proceedings what our fare is in camp. There is nothing to be got by hunting; yet perhaps there soon will. God send it. Amen."
- January 31, 1847: Patrick Breen's diary: "Lantron Murphy died last night about 1 o'clock. Mrs. Reid & John went to Graves this Morning to look after her goods."

=== February 1847 ===
- February 2, 1847: Harriet McCutchen dies.
- Early February, 1847: Rescuer Daniel Rhoads remembered, "They gave the alarm that the people would all die without assistance. It was two weeks before any person would consent to go. Finally, we concluded we would go or die trying, for not to make any attempt to save them would be a disgrace to us and California as long as time lasted." John Sutter, proprietor of Sutter's Fort, and Captain Edward Kern, the fort's temporary commander, offers $3 a day to anyone who will join a rescue party.
- February 3, 1847: Alcalde Bartlett of San Francisco calls a public meeting to raise funds and organize a party to rescue the trapped emigrants. The local citizens make generous donations of money, goods, and services.
- February 4, 1847: Margaret Eddy, whose father left with the snowshoers, dies.
- February 5, 1847: While the inhabitants of San Francisco are getting organized, a rescue party, called the First Relief, leaves Johnson's ranch. At the lake, Patrick Breen records: "Peggy very uneasy for fear we shall all perish with hunger. We have but a little meat left & only part of 3 hides has to support Mrs. Reid. She has nothing left but one hide & it is on Graves's shanty. Milt is living there & likely will keep that hide."
- February 6, 1847: Patrick Breen's diary: "It snowed faster last night & to day than it has done this winter & still Continues without an intermission. Wind S.W. Murphys folks or Keysburgs say they can't eat hides. I wish we had enough of them. Mrs Eddy very weak."
- February 7, 1847: In San Francisco a naval officer, Selim E. Woodworth, has been put in charge of the relief operations; James F. Reed is to lead the rescue party, called the Second Relief. Both men set out from San Francisco on this day, Woodworth to sail for Sutter's Fort, Reed to cross San Francisco Bay and recruit men and horses in the Sonoma and Napa areas. Patrick Breen's diary: "Ceased to snow last after one of the most Severe Storms we experienced this winter. The snow fell about 4 feet (1.2 m) [1.22 meters] deep. I had to shovel the snow off our shanty this morning. It thawed so fast & thawed during the whole storm. To day it is quite pleasant. Wind S.W. Milt [is] here to day [and] says Mrs Reid has to get a hide from Mrs. Murphy..." William Eddy's wife Eleanor dies at the Murphy cabin.
- February 8, 1847: Augustus Spitzer dies.
- February 9, 1847: Patrick Breen's diary: "Mrs Murphy here this morning. Pike's child all but dead. Milt at Murphy's; not able to get out of bed. Keyburg never gets up; says he is not able. John [Breen, Patrick's son] went down to day to bury Mrs Eddy & child. Heard nothing from Graves for 2 or 3 days. Mrs Murphy just now going to Graves. Fine morning. Wind S.E. Froze hard last night. Begins to thaw in the Sun." Milt Elliot dies at 9 P.M.
- February 10, 1847: Patrick Breen's diary: "Beautiful morning. Wind W. Froze hard last night. To day thawing in the Sun... J. Denton trying to borrow meat for Graves. Had none to give. They have nothing but hides. All are entirely out of meat but a little we have. Our hides are nearly all eat up. But, with God's help, spring will soon smile upon us."
- February 11, 1847: The First Relief reaches Mule Springs, four miles (6.4 km) beyond the snowline. Patrick Breen's diary: "Fine morning. Wind W. Froze hard last night. Some clouds lying in the E. Looks like thaw. John Denton here last night; very delicate. John & Mrs. Reid went to Graves this morning."
- February 12, 1847: Patrick Breen's diary: "A warm, thawey morning. Wind S.E. We, hope with the assistance of Almighty God, to be able to live to see bare surface of the earth once more. O God of Mercy, grant it if it be thy holy will. Amen."
- February 13, 1847: Patrick Breen's diary: "Fine morning. Clouded up yesterday evening; snowed a little & continued cloudy all night. Cleared off about day light. Wind about S.W. Mrs Reid has headache. The rest in health."
- February 14, 1847: Patrick Breen's diary: "Fine morning but cold before the sun got up. Now thawing in the sun. Wind S.E. Ellen Graves here this morning. John Denton not well. Froze hard last night. John & Edwd. buried Milt. this morning in the Snow."
- February 15, 1847: First Relief: three of the men turn back, seven continue on towards the Donner camps. Patrick Breen's diary: "Mrs Graves refused to give Mrs Reid any hides. Put Suitor's pack hides on her shanty. Would not let her have them. Says [that,] if I say it will thaw, it then will not; she is a case."
- February 16, 1847: Patrick Breen's diary: "Commenced to rain yesterday Evening. Turned to Snow during the night & continued until after daylight this morning. It is now sun shine & light showers of hail at times. Wind N.W. by W. We all feel very weakly to day. Snow not getting much less in quantity."
- February 17, 1847: Woodworth's launch arrives at Sutters Fort; it has taken him 11 days, fighting against the wind and the strong current of the swollen Sacramento River. He leaves the same day for Johnson's Ranch, the staging point of the rescue effort. Patrick Breen's diary: "Froze hard last night with heavy clouds running from the N.W. & light showers of hail at times. To day same kind of Weather. Wind N.W. Very cold & Cloudy. No sign of much thaw."
- February 18, 1847: Patrick Breen's diary: "Froze hard last night. To day clear & warm in the sun; cold in the shanty or in the shade. Wind S.E. All in good health. Thanks be to Almighty God. Amen."
- February 19, 1847: Patrick Breen's diary: "Froze hard last night. 7 men arrived from California yesterday with som provisions, but left the greater part on the way. To day clear & warm for this region. Some of the men are gone to day to Donner's Camp. Will start back on Monday." Daniel Rhoads, one of the rescuers, recalled, "At sunset, we crossed Truckee Lake on the ice, and came to the spot where, we had been told, we should find the emigrants. We looked all around, but no living thing except ourselves was in sight. We raised a loud hello. And then we saw a woman emerge from a hole in the snow. As we approached her, several others made their appearance, in like manner coming out of the snow. They were gaunt with famine; and I never can forget the horrible, ghastly sight they presented. The first woman spoke in a hollow voice, very much agitated, and said, 'Are you men from California or do you come from heaven?' "
- February 20, 1847: Catherine Pike dies. Three of the rescuers go to Alder Creek to check on the Donners.
- February 21, 1847: Patrick Breen's diary: "Thawey, warm day." The rescuers return to the lake camp from Alder Creek bringing six emigrants who are strong enough to travel.
- February 22, 1847: First Relief: Rescuers leave the lake camp with 23 refugees. Second Relief: After spending several days drying meat at Johnson's Ranch, Reed's party sets out for the mountains. Patrick Breen's diary: "The Californians started this morning, 24 [23] in number, some in a very weak state. Fine morning. Wind S.W. for the 3 last days. Mrs Keysburg started & left Keysburg here[; he was] unable to go... Paddy Reid & Tho[mas]s. came back." Patty Reed, eight years old, and her little brother Tommy give out and have to be taken back to the Breen cabin. Patty tells her mother "Well, Ma, if you never see me again, do the best that you can"; thirty-one people remain in the camps. There have been ten deaths at the lake camp and four at Alder Creek.
- February 23, 1847: Patrick Breen's diary: "Froze hard last night. To day fine & thawey. Has the appearance of spring. All but the deep snow. Wind S.S.E. Shot Towser [a dog] today & dressed his flesh. Mrs Graves came here this morning to borrow meat—dog or ox. They think I have meat to spare; but I know to the Contrary. They have plenty hides; I live principally on the same."
- February 24, 1847: First Relief: John Denton is unable to continue and must be left behind.
- February 25, 1847: First Relief: Ada Keseberg dies and is buried in the snow. Patrick Breen's diary: "Froze hard last night. Fine & sunshiny to day. Wind W. Mrs Murphy says the wolves are about to dig up the dead bodies at her shanty; the nights are too cold to watch them; we hear them howl."
- February 26, 1847: Patrick Breen's diary: "Martha's jaw swelled with the toothache: hungry times in camp; plenty hides, but the folks will not eat them. We eat them with a tolerable good apetite. Thanks be to Almighty God. Amen. Mrs Murphy said here yesterday that [she] thought she would Commence on Milt. & eat him. I don't [think] that she has done so yet; it is distressing. The Donners, 4 days ago, told the California folks that they [would] commence to eat the dead people if they did not succeed, that day or next, in finding their cattle, [which were] then under ten or twelve feet of snow, & [the Donners] did not know the spot or near it; I suppose they have done so ere this time."
- February 28, 1847: The First Relief, heading down the mountains, encounters the Second Relief coming up. After nearly five months' separation, James Reed meets his wife and two of his children, but learns that the other two are still at the camp. Patrick Breen's diary: "1 Solitary Indian passed by yesterday, come from the lake; had a heavy pack on his back; gave me 5 or 6 roots resembling Onions in shape, taste some like a sweet potato, all full of little tough fibers." (In Eliza Farnham's California, In-Doors and Out (1856), John Breen called these "soap-root.")

=== March 1847 ===
- March 1, 1847: Patrick Breen's diary: "There has 10 men arrived this morning from Bear Valley with provisions. We are to start in two or three days & Cash our goods here. There is, amongst them, some old. They say the snow will be here until June." Patty Reed and Thomas Reed are still alive when James Reed and the rest of the Second Relief reach the lake. The rescuers find the grim evidence of cannibalism at the lake camp and at Alder Creek. They leave with 17 emigrants. Three men from the rescue party stay behind at the camps to help the weakened emigrants prepare for the next relief.
- March 5, 1847: About this date, two of the rescuers left at the camps, Charles Stone and Charles Cady, tell Tamsen Donner they will rescue her three little girls. They take the children from Alder Creek to the Breen cabin and abandon them there with the handful of emigrants remaining at the lake camp.
- March 5–7, 1847: The worst storm of the season strikes. The Second Relief and their charges, caught at the top of Donner Pass, are unable to proceed and spend two days huddled around a fire they can barely keep lit. When the storm clears, most of the refugees are too weak to move. Reed and his companions take three children and leave the rest, members of the Breen, Graves, and Jacob Donner families. Three die and are cannibalized at what will become known as "Starved Camp". The Third Relief, led by William Eddy and William Foster, finds the 11 survivors five days later. One of the rescuers, John Stark, stays and takes the refugees down out of the mountains.
- March 7, 1847: Jacob Donner's son Lewis dies as the storm ends. Jacob's wife Elizabeth and another son, Samuel, are the only members of his family left at Alder Creek; Elizabeth dies a few days later.
- March 13, 1847: Eddy and Foster arrive at the lake and find that their sons, James and George, have died. Only 9 people are left alive at the camps. Tamsen Donner refuses to leave her dying husband, and the others are too weak to go. The Third Relief rescues four people, leaving four or five alive at the camps. (It is not clear whether Samuel Donner is still alive at this point.)
- March, 1847: Sometime toward the end of this month, George Donner dies. After laying him out, his wife Tamsen sets out to cross the mountains. She arrives at the Breen cabin, where Lewis Keseberg is living, but she does not survive the night.

=== April 1847 ===
- April 17, 1847: The Fourth Relief reaches the lake. Lewis Keseberg, surrounded by half-eaten corpses, is the only one alive.
- April 21, 1847: The Fourth Relief leaves the lake with Keseberg in tow.
- April 29, 1847: The last member of the Donner Party, Lewis Keseberg, arrives at Sutter's Fort.

=== June 1847 ===
- June 22, 1847: General Stephen Watts Kearny, heading east, reaches what he calls the "Cannibal Camp". Mormon Battalion veterans in his party gather the remains into the Breen cabin. The bodies are buried there and the cabin is then set afire.

=== Mortality summary ===
There were 87 emigrants in the Donner Party, plus Luis and Salvador, two California Indians who joined them in Nevada, for a total of 89 people. Of the 89, a net of 81 people were trapped in the mountains, due to additions and departures from the group during the journey.

Of the total 89 people, 41 died and 48 survived; of the original 87 emigrants, 39 died and 48 survived; of the 81 people trapped in the mountains, 36 died and 45 survived.

About two-thirds of the women and children survived, while about two-thirds of the men died. All four Donner adults (the couples George & Tamsen Donner and Jacob & Elizabeth Donner) died; most of the Reeds and all the Breens survived.

== Deaths ==
	Name	Family/Group	Sex	Age	Date of death	Location of death	Cause of death	Disposal of remains
1	Sarah Keyes	Reed family	F	70	May 29, 1846	Kansas	Old age and illness	Buried
2	Luke Halloran	Taken in by Donner family at Little Sandy	M	25	August 25, 1846	Nr Grantsville, UT	Tuberculosis	Buried
3	John Snyder	Graves teamster	M	25	October 5, 1846	Iron Point, NV	Stabbed by James Reed	Buried
4	Mr. Hardkoop	Taken in by Keseberg	M	60	abt October 10, 1846	Along trail	Unknown	Left behind
5	Mr. Wolfinger	German immigrant	M	26	abt October 25, 1846	Humboldt Sink	Killed by Reinhardt & Spitzer	Unknown
6	William Pike	Murphy	M	32	October 30, 1846	Truckee Canyon	Accidentally shot	Buried
7	Baylis Williams	Reed employee	M	25	December 14, 1846	Reed cabin	Fever	Buried
8	Jacob Donner	Brother of George	M	56	Bef December 20, 1846	Alder Creek	Starvation	Cannibalized later
9	Samuel Shoemaker	With Jacob Donner	M	25	Bef December 20, 1846	Alder Creek	Exposure	Cannibalized later
10	Joseph Reinhardt	With Wolfinger	M	30	Bef December 20, 1846	Alder Creek	Fever	Prob. cannibalized later
11	James Smith	Reed teamster	M	25	Bef December 20, 1846	Alder Creek	Exposure	Prob. cannibalized later
12	Charles T. Stanton	With Donners	M	35	Abt December 21, 1846	Summit Valley	Starvation, exhaustion, exposure	Left behind
13	Antonio	With Donners	M	23	December 24 or 25, 1846	Camp of Death	Hypothermia	Cannibalized
14	Franklin W. Graves	Graves	M	57	December 25, 1846	Camp of Death	Hypothermia	Cannibalized
15	Patrick Dolan		M	35	December 25, 1846	Camp of Death	Hypothermia	Cannibalized
16	Lemuel Murphy	Murphy	M	12	December 26, 1846	Camp of Death	Starvation, exhaustion	Cannibalized
17	Charles Burger	Donner teamster	M	30	December 29, 1846	Keseberg lean-to	Starvation	Buried
18	Jay Fosdick	Graves	M	23	abt January 6, 1847	Sierra foothills	Starvation, exhaustion	Cannibalized
*	Luis	Indian guide	M	19	abt January 8, 1847	Sierra foothills	Shot by William Foster	Cannibalized
*	Salvador	Indian guide	M	28	abt January 8, 1847	Sierra foothills	Shot by William Foster	Cannibalized
19	Louis Keseberg Jr.	Keseberg	M	1	January 24, 1847	Murphy cabin	Starvation	Unknown
20	Landrum Murphy	Murphy	M	16	January 31, 1847	Murphy cabin	Starvation	Cannibalized later
21	Harriet McCutchen	McCutcheon	F	1	February 2, 1847	Graves cabin	Starvation	Buried
22	Margaret Eddy	Eddy	F	1	February 4, 1847	Murphy cabin	Starvation	Buried
23	Eleanor Eddy	Eddy	F	25	February 7, 1847	Murphy cabin	Starvation	Buried
24	Augustus Spitzer	Donner teamster	M	30	February 8, 1847	Breen cabin	Starvation	Buried
25	Milt Elliot	Reed teamster	M	28	February 9, 1847	Murphy cabin	Starvation	Cannibalized later
26	Catherine Pike	Murphy	F	1	February 20, 1847	Murphy cabin	Starvation	Buried in snow
27	Ada Keseberg	Keseberg	F	3	abt February 24, 1847	Donner Pass	Starvation, exhaustion	Buried in snow
28	John Denton	With Donners	M	30	abt February 25, 1847	Summit Valley	Starvation, exhaustion	Buried in snow
29	William Hook	Jacob Donner	M	12	abt February 27, 1847	Foothill camp	Refeeding after starvation	Buried
30	George Foster	Murphy	M	4	March 1847	Breen cabin	Starvation	Cannibalized
31	James P. Eddy	Eddy	M	3	March 1847	Breen cabin	Starvation	Cannibalized
32	Isaac Donner	Jacob Donner	M	5	abt March 6, 1847	Starved Camp	Starvation, exhaustion	Cannibalized
33	Franklin Graves, Jr.	Graves	M	5	abt March 8, 1847	Starved Camp	Starvation, exhaustion	Cannibalized
34	Elizabeth Graves	Graves	F	45	abt March 8, 1847	Starved Camp	Starvation, exhaustion	Cannibalized
35	Lewis Donner	Jacob Donner	M	3	March 7, 1847	Alder Creek	Starvation	Buried in snow
36	Elizabeth Donner	Jacob Donner	F	40	March 1847	Alder Creek	Starvation	Unknown
37	Samuel Donner	Jacob Donner	M	4	March 1847	Alder Creek	Starvation	Unknown
38	Levinah Murphy	Murphy	F	36	March 1847	Breen cabin	Starvation	Cannibalized
39	George Donner	Captain of Donner Party	M	60/62	March 1847	Alder Creek	Starvation, infection	Cannibalized
40	Tamsen Donner	George Donner	F	44	March or April 1847	Breen cabin	Either murder or freezing	Cannibalized

* Luis and Salvador were not among the original 87 emigrants; their deaths bring the total number up to 42. However, as Sarah Keyes died early in the journey, she is not always included in the death toll, bringing the number of deaths to 41.

== See also ==
- Hastings Cutoff
- Donner Party
- Sierra Nevada
- Great Salt Lake Desert
