= Jimmy Reid (disambiguation) =

Jimmy Reid (1932–2010) was a Scottish trade union activist, orator, politician and journalist.

Jimmy Reid may also refer to:

- Jimmy Reid (footballer, born 1879) (1879–1976), Scottish footballer for Port Vale, West Ham United and Tottenham Hotspur
- Jimmy Reid (footballer, born 1890) (1890–1938), Scottish footballer for Lincoln City, Airdrieonians and Clydebank
- Jimmy Reid (footballer, born 1935) (1935–2017), Scottish footballer for Dundee United, Bury and Stockport County

== See also ==
- Jim Reid (disambiguation)
- James Reid (disambiguation)
- Jimmy Reed, American blues musician
