= Virginia Reed Murphy =

American memoirist and Donner Party survivor

Virginia Reed Murphy (1833 or 1834 – 1921) was an American memoirist and survivor of the Donner Party. She is best known for Across the Plains in the Donner Party, a firsthand narrative of the Donner Party's overland journey to California and the hardships the emigrants faced in the winter of 1846–1847.

== Life ==
Murphy was born Virginia Reed, also referred to in some sources as Virginia Backenstoe Reed. As a child, she traveled west with her family as part of the Donner Party, one of the most widely studied emigrant groups in the history of American westward migration. She was the stepdaughter of James F. Reed, a prominent member of the party.

After surviving the expedition, she married John Murphy and became known as Virginia Reed Murphy.

== Writing ==
Murphy is known for Across the Plains in the Donner Party, a memoir recounting her experiences during the journey west and the ordeal in the Sierra Nevada. Her narrative is one of the best-known firsthand accounts by a Donner Party survivor and has frequently been used by later historians writing about the disaster.

A modern edition of Murphy's account was later included in Across the Plains in the Donner Party & History of the Donner Party Omnibus Edition, published by Capital Books Press in 2024.

== Works ==
- Across the Plains in the Donner Party: A Personal Narrative of the Overland Trip to California (1891)
- Across the Plains in the Donner Party & History of the Donner Party Omnibus Edition (with Charles Fayette McGlashan and Ross Rojek, 2024)
