= Eliza P. Donner Houghton =

American memoirist and Donner Party survivor

- Born: Eliza Poor Donner; 1843
- Died: 1921 (aged 77–78)
- Occupation: Memoirist

Eliza P. Donner Houghton (1843–1921) was an American memoirist and survivor of the Donner Party. She is best known for The Expedition of the Donner Party and Its Tragic Fate, a firsthand account of the Donner Party disaster and its aftermath.

== Life ==
Houghton was born Eliza Poor Donner, the daughter of George Donner and Tamsen Donner. As a young child, she traveled west with her family in 1846 as part of the Donner Party, the emigrant wagon train that became trapped in the Sierra Nevada during the winter of 1846–1847.

She survived the ordeal, though both of her parents died during the disaster. In later life, she wrote about the experience from the perspective of a survivor and family member. She also married Sherman Otis Houghton who became a U.S. Representative, and with whom she raised at least five sons and two daughters.

== Writing ==
Houghton is best known for The Expedition of the Donner Party and Its Tragic Fate, originally published in 1911. The book is one of the best-known firsthand narratives of the Donner Party and has frequently been used by later historians writing about the event.

A modern edition of Houghton's memoir was published by Capital Books Press in 2025.

== Works ==
- The Expedition of the Donner Party and Its Tragic Fate (1911)
- The Expedition of the Donner Party and Its Tragic Fate: A Survivor's True Account of America's Most Harrowing Pioneer Journey (2025)

== See also ==
- Donner Party
- George Donner
- Tamsen Donner
