= American Murder Song =

American musical act

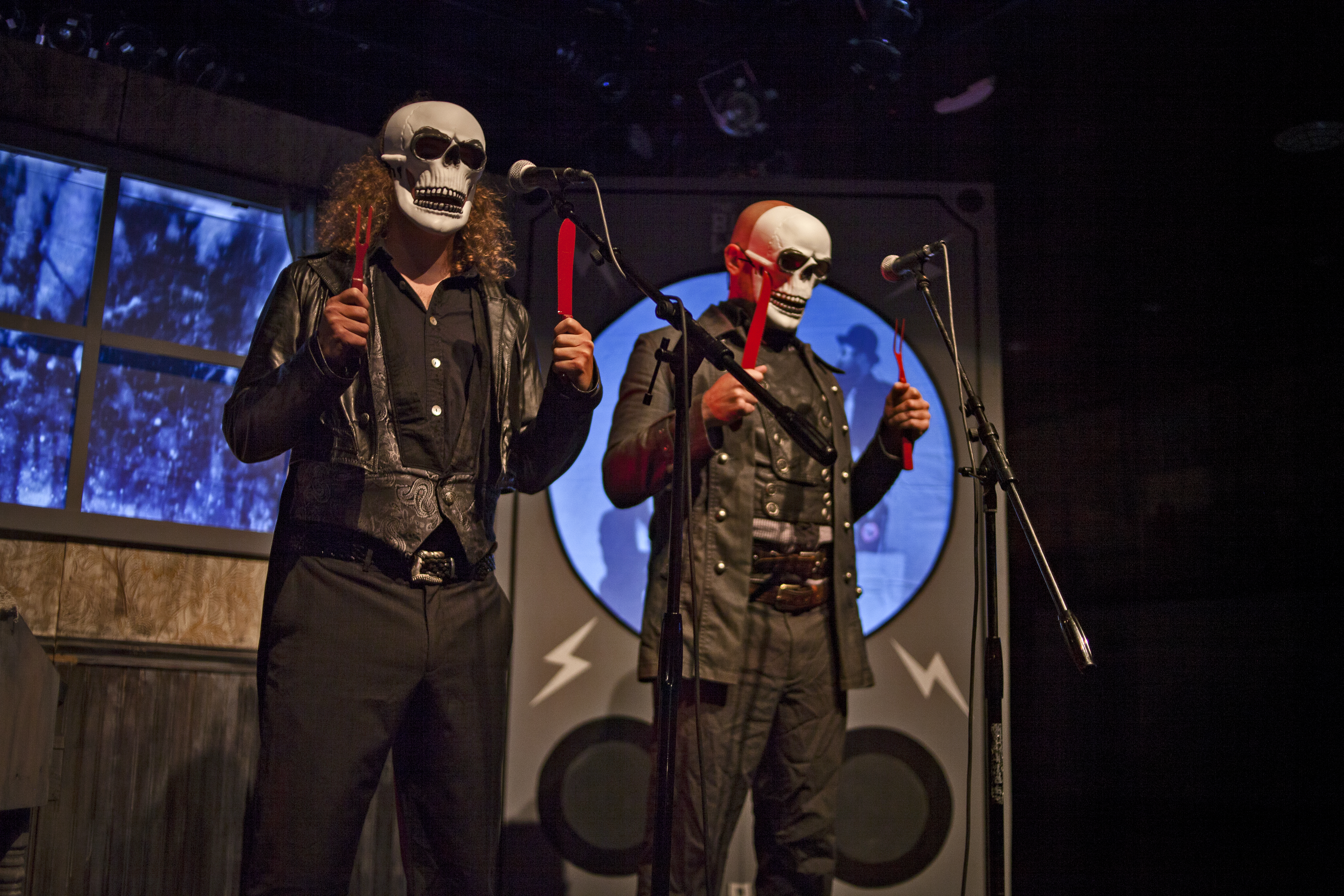
- American Murder Song performs "The Black Wagon" in Pensacola, Florida, October 2017

Background information
- Origin: Los Angeles, California, United States
- Genres: Murder ballads, dark folk, dark cabaret
- Years active: 2016–2021, 2025-
- Members: Saar Hendelman; Terrance Zdunich
- Website: americanmurdersong.com

American Murder Song (sometimes abbreviated AMS) is an American musical act founded in 2016 by cult film composers and performers Terrance Zdunich and Saar Hendelman. The project uses the murder ballad genre to explore American history, especially 19th-century America.

In American Murder Song, Saar and Terrance play the role of roguish balladeers Mister Storm and Mister Tender who make a pact with the Bible's Cain to chronicle the tales of killers, known as Survivors, who bear The Mark, an American Mark of Cain.

By way of live shows, music videos and albums, American Murder Song has so far explored 1816, also known as "The Year Without a Summer", The Donner Party's deadly journey of 1846 and "The Killing Place", a metaphoric house of Cain where all murder ballads reside.

== History ==
=== Previous collaborations ===
Terrance and Saar met in Los Angeles in the early 2000s. According to Saar, they "met through a mutual friend and became admirers of each other's works: running in the same creative circles and seeing each other perform around town." Before collaborating as songwriters, Saar played piano on the soundtrack to Repo! The Genetic Opera, a 2008 Lionsgate musical film co-written by Terrance, in which Terrance also played a starring role as the enigmatic GraveRobber alongside the likes of Sarah Brightman, Paris Hilton and Anthony Stewart Head. Terrance then appeared as a guest vocalist on Saar's 2009 solo album Bleed On Your Dress.

In 2012, Saar and Terrance teamed-up with Repo! The Genetic Opera's director Darren Lynn Bousman to create The Devil's Carnival, a cult musical film starring Emilie Autumn, Paul Sorvino, Sean Patrick Flannery, and Terrance in the title role of Lucifer. Terrance and Saar composed the music for the film, which Ain't It Cool News described as having "...a frantic kaleidoscope-Elfman vibe, but with a much more devious slant."

Saar and Terrance went on to write Alleluia! The Devil's Carnival, the 2015 sequel to The Devil's Carnival, which starred David Hasselhoff, Tech N9ne, and Broadway legends Ted Neeley and Adam Pascal. Terrance said the music of Alleluia! The Devil's Carnival was "molded after a Golden Age of Hollywood big band sound."

Terrance and Saar's collaboration on American Murder Song was announced in August 2015 on the Alleluia! The Devil's Carnival film tour. The duo released their first online trailer for the project on March 10, 2016, which featured the voice of The Devil's Carnival collaborator and Sons of Anarchy star Dayton Callie. The first live performance of American Murder Song followed in May of that year in New Jersey at the Steampunk World's Fair.

=== 2016–17: Murder Ballads of 1816: The Year Without a Summer ===
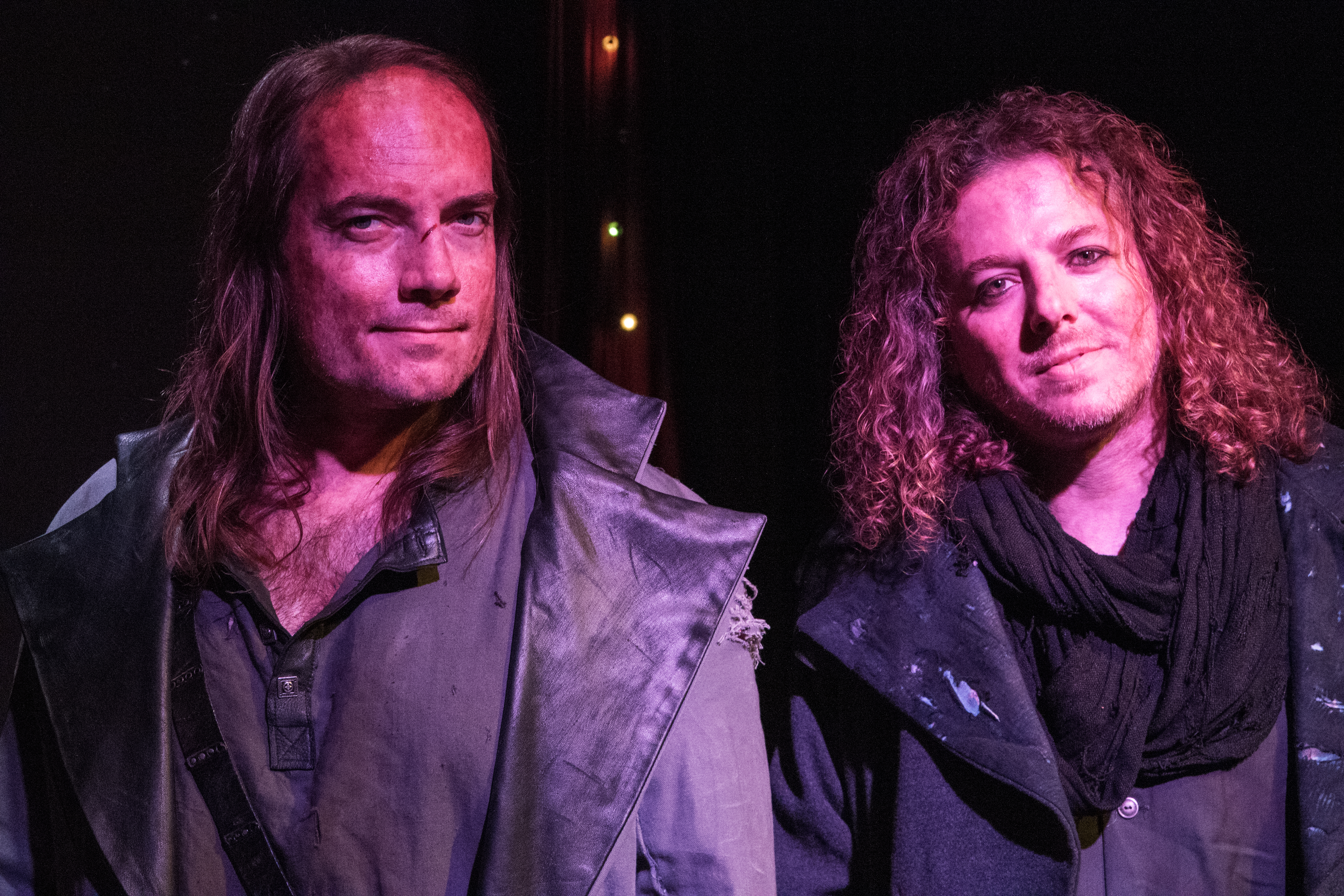
Zdunich and Hendelman as Messrs. Tender and Storm, respectively

American Murder Song's debut ballads are set in 1816 when severe climate abnormalities lowered global temperatures, which reduced American crop yields and "hastened the country's violent Westward Expansion." The Year Without A Summer was first released as 4 extended play recordings (EPs) and multiple online videos that introduced characters from the songs, including "Pretty Lavinia," about America's first purported female serial killer, Lavinia Fisher. The videos featured performances by cult music stars like Arch Enemy’s Alissa White-Gluz as Pretty Lavinia, Aurelio Voltaire as lothario wife-killer Unwed Henry, and Chibi, front woman of The Birthday Massacre, as Sweet Rosalie, an "escaped mental patient who leaves a trail of dead in her wake."

Additional videos extended the 1816 storyline and featured alternative model Ulorin Vex as Mother Columbia, alongside Scotty Morris (Big Bad Voodoo Daddy), Curtis RX (Creature Feature), Morgue (AMC's Freakshow) and Toledo Diamond (The Toledo Show) as her henchmen.

On EP I. Dawn, American Murder Song reinterpreted the traditional Child Ballad "Edward," the tale of a boy who murders his brother and then lies to his mother about the cause of the blood on his skin and clothing. The Year Without A Summer also features the first female personification of America, Columbia, in a drunken and bloody deconstruction of one of America's first unofficial national anthems, "Hail, Columbia!"

In October 2016, Terrance and Saar took The Year Without A Summer on tour with American Murder Song Presents "The American Wake Tour." The tour hit 30 American cities and re-enacted the music of 1816 by way of a historical wake for the fictitious A. Finneus Buck, where "Fans flocked to the event dressed in their best funeral attire, ready to pay their respects to the deceased."

Due to popular demand, The American Wake Tour extended to 5 additional American cities and on January 20, 2017, American Murder Song performed selections of The Year Without A Summer at the Edwardian Ball in San Francisco.

=== 2017–18: Murder Ballads of 1846: The Donner Party ===
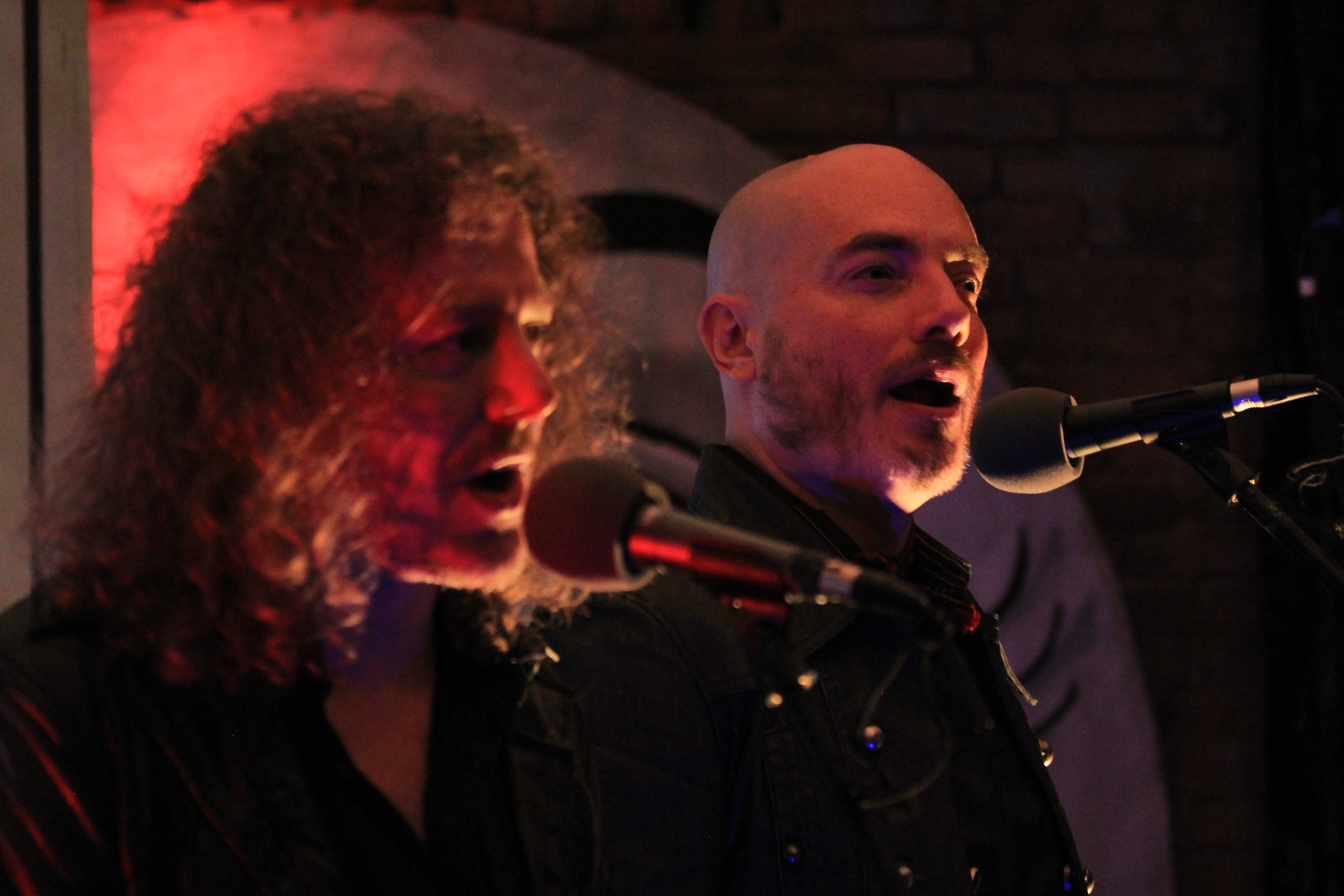
Hendelman and Zdunich performing in Brooklyn on The Donner Party Reunion Tour, October 2017

In March 2017, during a Facebook Live video stream for American Murder Song's "One Year Annivers'ry Party," Saar and Terrance announced that the theme for their second year of murder ballads would be the Donner Party, the infamous American pioneers who got stuck in the snowy Sierra Nevada Mountains and resorted to cannibalism. That same March, Terrance and Saar embarked on a research road trip where they followed in the historical footprints of the Donner Party and invited fans to be a part of the journey by watching live streaming videos.

In August 2017, American Murder Song released The Donner Party album, followed by a series of corresponding online videos. With The Donner Party, Terrance and Saar departed from the gritty, harsh sound established with Murder Ballads Of 1816: The Year Without A Summer. The new album veered into more "zany" territory with songs like "The Devil In Camp," about the Donner Party's most infamous member, Lewis Keseberg, "presented in the form of 50's surfer music." The Donner Party album also pays homage to Spaghetti Western soundtracks with "The Cry of the Banished Horseman," about the Donner Party's de facto leader James F. Reed, and dark fantasy in "The Last Americans" about Tamsen Donner's final moments.

American Murder Song's The Donner Party videos presented the songs by way of a "fictional, Twilight Zone-style show" called "The Black Wagon." This television theme continued on American Murder Song Presents "The Donner Party Reunion Tour," which kicked off in October 2017. The Donner Party Reunion Tour visited 37 cities in North America and welcomed audiences to a live-taping of "The Black Wagon." The tour began with a preview performance at Atlanta's Dragon Con.

On March 14, 2018, Saar and Terrance announced the release of American Murder Song Presents "The Donner Party Board Game," a tabletop game based on the historical facts of the Donner Party's journey.

=== 2018–19: Murder Ballads from The House of Cain: The Killing Place ===
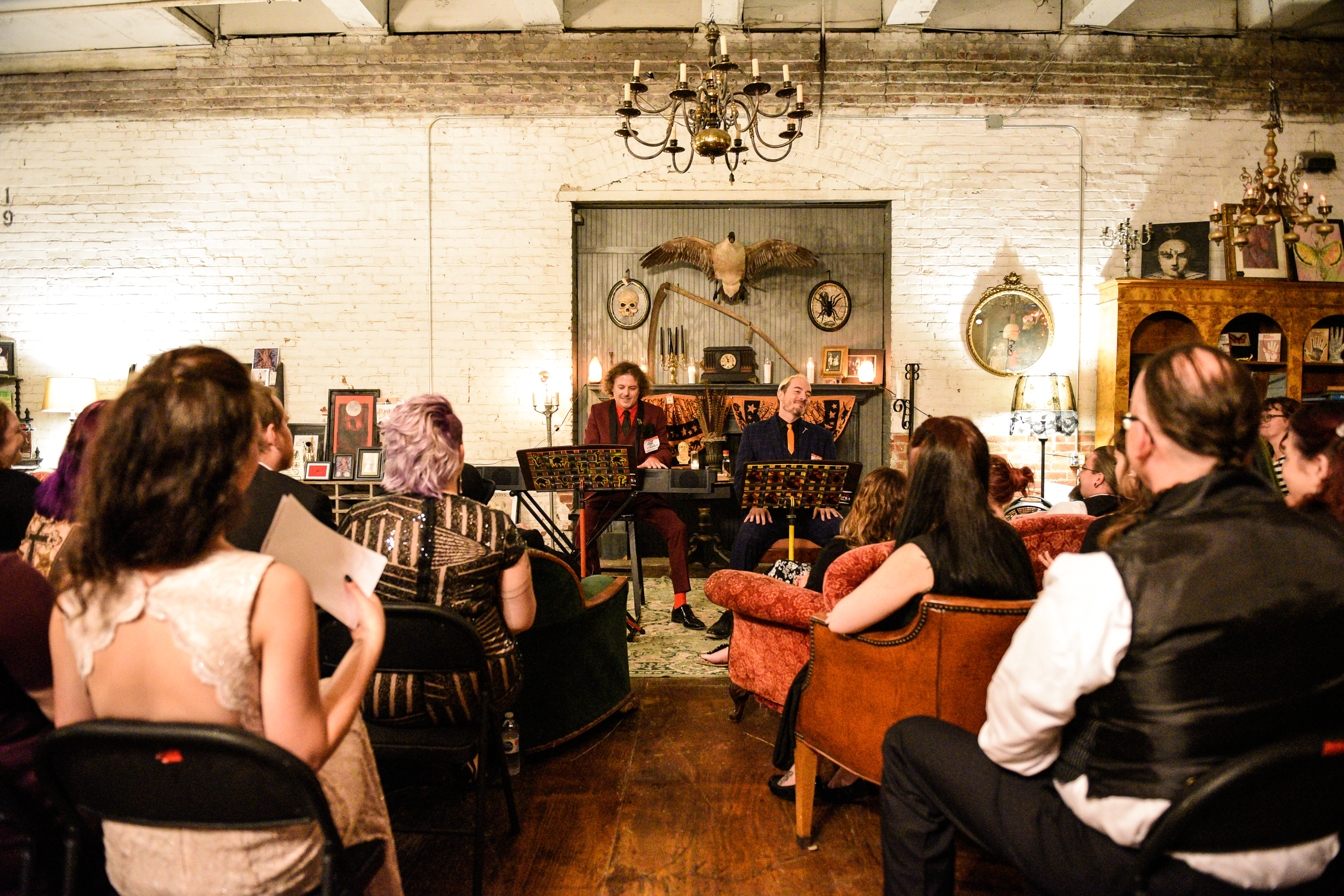
Hendelman and Zdunich performing at the Kansas City Anti-Recital, September 2018

In March 2018, Terrance and Saar hosted another Facebook Live video stream for American Murder Song's “Two-Year Anniversary Feast.” The broadcast was a fundraiser where Saar and Terrance celebrated by ingesting a menu of Donner Party-themed boiled offal. During the stream, Terrance describe the undertaking as “American Murder Song by way of Jackass.” The duo didn't resort to cannibalism during the live stream, but the dishes for the evening did include bull testicles and pig stomach.

In the days leading up to the “Two-Year Anniversary Feast,” Saar and Terrance asked online fans to submit popular murder ballads as potential tunes for American Murder Song to cover. This concept of reinterpreting well-known songs about killers would play a major role in the album and tours that followed.

American Murder Song performed a cover song on each of its first two tours, reimagining the Violent Femmes' “American Music” as a Colonial tavern sing-along on The American Wake Tour and Louis Prima's “The Closer To The Bone (The Sweeter Is The Meat)” as a cannibal's love song on The Donner Party Reunion Tour. But outside of “Edward,” American Murder Song had not yet delved into reinterpreting traditional murder ballads.

In April, Terrance and Saar began recording their third studio album, The Killing Place, which was released in November, 2018, and featured cover versions of popular tunes involving murder, including a double kick gunslinger take on Foster The People's “Pumped Up Kicks,” about a school shooting, and a rock 'n' roll chain gang rendition of “Jenny Was a Friend of Mine” by The Killers, based loosely on the 1986 murder of Jennifer Levin by Robert Chambers. The Killing Place also included a revamp of “In All My Dreams I Drown,” a number written for a scene that was deleted from The Devil's Carnival, but nonetheless became one of Terrance and Saar's most popular compositions.

In June, Saar and Terrance announced their third tour together, which also was a departure from their established American Murder Song fare. They called it An Anti-Recital With Terrance & Saar and billed it as “A Private Room. No Stage. No Microphones. Just You, The Boys & A Piano,” where they encouraged fans to “Dress To Kill.” The Anti-Recital was held at a series of publicly undisclosed locations that ranged from oddity shops to tattoo parlors, and recording studios to small theaters. Ghastly Grinning described the Anti-Recital experience as “... casual and familiar, it’s a cocktail hour at a friend’s house, yet the dress code and lack of technology lends it a bit of finesse, a grace and dignity that calls to mind the feel of exclusivity, of being included in something much more intimate than a crowded show or auditorium screening meet-and-greet.”

In August, Saar and Terrance announced that American Murder Song would be the opening act for the cello rock group Rasputina on their West Coast US tour. The Rasputina tour was followed by the Anti-Recital tour in September, which sold out, prompting Terrance and Saar to book a “Hardcore Encore,” taking the Anti-Recital to new stops in America and Canada, as well as debut performances in the UK, Netherlands and Germany. The Anti-Recital Hardcore Encore took place from February to March 2019.

After returning from the tour in April 2019, the duo began discussing their next album.

=== 2020–21: Jammies & Jams tour and livestreaming ===
The Coronavirus pandemic in the United States severely affected the ability of musicians to perform live during the period. American Murder Song performed live on six occasions as part of their "Jammies & Jams" tour from June 2020 to June 2021. A handful of livestreamed shows also took place including a "2020 Good Riddance Party" in December 2020, a fifth anniversary "Unbirthday" performance in June 2021, and concerts for Halloween and New Year's eve that year. The group's website and social media seemingly went inactive after their final livestreamed performance on December 31, 2021.

=== 2025-2026: The Seven Deadly Sinners ===
Nearly four years later on November 21, 2025, Zdunich and Hendelman released An American Murder Song, with lyrics depicting the supposed origin of their characters, Tender and Storm, rising from the ground in a chapel built by Cain. The pair's website was also updated with announcements of an upcoming album, The Seven Deadly Sinners, set to feature seventeen tracks, including songs about John Wilkes Booth (embodying the sin of Pride), Lizzie Borden (Wrath), and H. H. Holmes (Gluttony). Lizzie Borden (Wrath) was released December 10, 2025. H.H Holmes (Gluttony) was released on March 17th 2026. The full album, featuring spoken tracks with commentary about the titular "sinners", was released on October 1, 2026. The remaining "sinners" featured on the album, on top of Booth, Borden, and Holmes, consist of Bathsheba Spooner (Lust), Robert Ford (Sloth), Emma Williams' 1892 murder of her lover Eleanor Richardson (Envy), and Little Pete (Greed).

== Themes and style ==
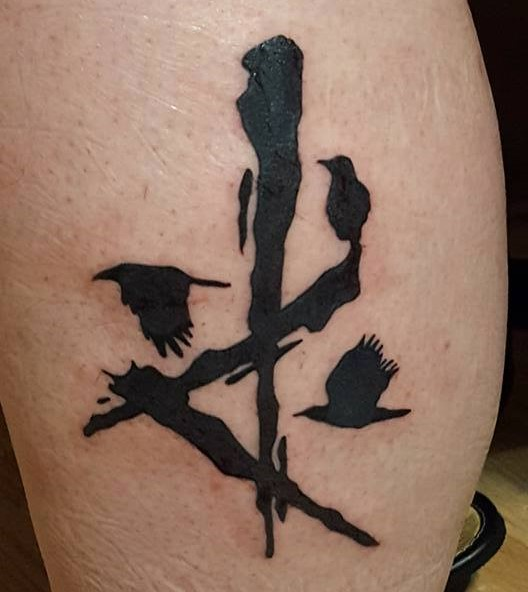
A fan tattoo of American Murder Song's The Mark with crows

- The killers featured in American Murder Song's ballads and videos all wear The Mark, an American Mark of Cain, branded on their left forearms.
- Saar and Terrance's alter egos, Mister Storm and Mister Tender, are often symbolized respectively by a key and anatomical heart.
- Because of associations with their past film projects, Terrance and Saar's work is often placed within the horror and goth subculture genres, but in an interview with Patchchord News about American Murder Song, Terrance disagreed with this categorization stating, "I think it's more like dark poetry that's all based in history."
- The “Murder Ballad Monday” column of Sing Out! magazine said that American Murder Song deals with themes of "God and Country" and "brings into focus both the Jeffersonian promise of early America, and the sense that that promise has fallen away."
- While most of the songs produced are set roughly in the nineteenth century, the Donner Party focuses mainly on the titular failed expedition, often referencing actual facts, such as the song "The Five Sisters" referencing the survival of five women in the party.

== Collaborations ==
- EPs I. Dawn and II. Providence were produced by Scotty Morris of Big Bad Voodoo Daddy.
- On EP III. The Reckoning, the song "June" features Cradle of Filth session player Lindsay Schoolcraft as "The Landowner." The spoken-word track, written in the form of diary entries, presents a woman who killed her brother in order to claim her family's farm and then questions whether the bad turn of weather in 1816 is God's retribution. Lindsay Schoolcraft was also featured in a filmed cameo as a harp player on The American Wake Tour.
- America's Got Talent semi-finalist Andrew De Leon performed as an opening act for American Murder Song on select stops of The American Wake Tour.
- American Murder Song's The Year Without A Summer videos feature the following notable performers: Alissa White-Gluz as Pretty Lavinia, Aurelio Voltaire as Unwed Henry, Chibi as Sweet Rosalie, Ulorin Vex as Mother Columbia, Curtis Rx as Brother North, Scotty Morris as Brother East, Morgue as Brother South, and Toledo Diamond as Brother West.
- American Murder Song frequently collaborates with director and visual effect artist Jake Akuna, graphic designer Oceano Ransford and stop motion animator Harry Chaskin (Robot Chicken).

== Audience participation ==
Terrance and Saar regularly use social media to involve fans in their creative process. In March 2017, they took a research and writing road trip where they followed the historical trail that the Donner Party took in 1846, inviting fans to participate in the journey with them via live video streams. In July of that same year, they live-broadcast Terrance drawing art for a The Donner Party Lunchbox, which they released as merchandise that September. In March 2018, for American Murder Song's "Two-Year Anniversary Feast," Saar and Terrance offered fans chances to play The Donner Party Board Game with them, as well as be featured on their The Killing Place album.

== Discography ==
=== Albums ===
- The Donner Party (August 2017; expanded reissue as Murder Ballads of 1846: The Donner Party in November 2018)
- Murder Ballads of 1816: The Year Without a Summer (June 2018)
- The Killing Place (November 2018)
- The Seven Deadly Sinners (October 2026)

=== Compilations ===
- 12 Songs Of Bad, Bad Murder (released only on 12" vinyl) (October 2017)

=== EPs ===
- I. Dawn (May 2016)
- II. Providence (June 2016)
- III. The Reckoning (August 2016)
- IV. Wake (February 2017)

=== DVDs ===
- Sakes To Keep (included as part of a limited edition box set) (December 2016)

== Concert tours ==
- The American Wake Tour (2016)
- The Donner Party Reunion Tour (2017)
- Rasputina West Coast Tour (2018)
- An Anti-Recital With Terrance & Saar (2018–19)
- Jammies & Jams: An American Murder Song Listening Party (2020–21)
- Upcoming "Chapel Tour" (Unknown)
