= James Read (disambiguation) =

Jim or James Read may refer to:

- James Read Chadwick (1844–1905), American gynecologist and medical librarian
- James Canham Read (1855–1894), British bigamist known as Southend Murderer or Prittlewell Murderer
- James Morgan Read (1908–1985), American educationalist and UN Commissioner
- Jim Read (footballer) (1943–2020), Australian who played for St Kilda in VFL
- James Read (actor) (born 1953), American cast member in North and South
- Jim Read (alpine skier) (born 1962), Canadian Olympic alpine skier
- James Read, drummer for black metal band Revenge (Canadian band)

== See also ==
- James Reed (disambiguation)
- James Reid (disambiguation)
- James Ready (disambiguation)
