= Capital Books Press =

American independent publishing company

Capital Books Press is an American independent publishing company based in Sacramento, California. It publishes books focused on California history, regional culture, and historical reprints.

The press has issued new editions of historical works related to the Donner Party, including The Expedition of the Donner Party and Its Tragic Fate by Eliza P. Donner Houghton and Across the Plains in the Donner Party & History of the Donner Party Omnibus Edition by Virginia Reed Murphy and Charles Fayette McGlashan.

The company describes its publishing program as centered on making important works of California history available to contemporary readers.

== Publications ==
- The Expedition of the Donner Party and Its Tragic Fate by Eliza P. Donner Houghton (2025)
- Across the Plains in the Donner Party & History of the Donner Party Omnibus Edition by Virginia Reed Murphy, Charles Fayette McGlashan, and Ross Rojek (2024)
