= Jim Reed =

Jim Reed may refer to:

- Jim Reed (coach) (1903–1994), American soccer coach
- Jim Reed (journalist) (1938–2011), Canadian journalist and news anchor
- Jim Reed (outlaw) (1845–1874), American outlaw
- Jim Reed (racing driver) (1926–2019), American racecar driver
- Jim Reed (academic) (born 1937), scholar of German literature
- Jim Reed, a police officer in Adam-12 portrayed by Kent McCord

== See also ==
- Jimmy Reed
- Jim Read (disambiguation)
- Jim Reid (disambiguation)
- James Reed (disambiguation)
