= Jamie Reed (disambiguation) =

Jamie Reed (born 1973) is a British politician.

Jamie Reed may also refer to:

- Jamie Reed (footballer) (born 1987)
- Jamie Reed (The Only Way is Essex)

== See also ==
- Jamie Reid (disambiguation)
- James Reed (disambiguation)
