= James Reed =

Jim, Jimmy, Jamie or James Reed may refer to:

== Military men ==
- James Reed (soldier) (1724–1807), American officer in French and Indian War and American Revolution
- James Sewall Reed (1832–1864), American Civil War Californian Union Army leader

== Politicians ==
- James A. Reed (politician) (1861–1944), United States Senator from Missouri from 1911 until 1929
- James B. Reed (1881–1935), U.S. Representative from Arkansas
- Jamie Reed (born 1973), English Labour MP for Copeland

== Sportsmen ==
- Jim Reed (coach) (1903–1994), American soccer coach
- Jim Reed (racing driver) (1926–2019), American racecar driver
- James Reed (defensive tackle) (born 1977), American football player
- Jamie Reed (footballer) (born 1987), English striker and coach
- James Reed (linebacker) (born 1955), American football player

== Others ==
- James F. Reed (1800–1874), Irish-American organizer of Donner Party
- Jim Reed (outlaw) (1845–1874), American outlaw
- James Hay Reed (1853–1927), American federal judge
- James Henry Reed, South Australian architect who partnered with Isidor George Beaver during 1880s and 1890s
- Jimmy Reed (1925–1976), American blues musician and songwriter
- Jim Reed (academic) (born 1937), British scholar of German literature
- Jim Reed (journalist) (1938–2011), Canadian journalist and news anchor
- James Earl Reed (1958–2008), American murderer executed in South Carolina
- James Reed (businessman) (born 1963), English executive chairman of Reed group
- James Reed (filmmaker), director of 2020 documentary My Octopus Teacher
- Jamie Reed, participant on British reality show (List of The Only Way Is Essex cast members) in 2011–2013 and 2017

== Characters ==
- James "Jim" Reed, police officer portrayed by Kent McCord on American TV series Adam-12

== See also ==
- James Reid (disambiguation)
- James Read (disambiguation)
- Jamie Reed (disambiguation)
