= Battle of Santa Clara (1847) =

1847 battle of the Mexican-American War near Santa Clara, California

Coordinates: 37°21.2′N 121°57.2′W

- Part of the Conquest of California; Mexican–American War
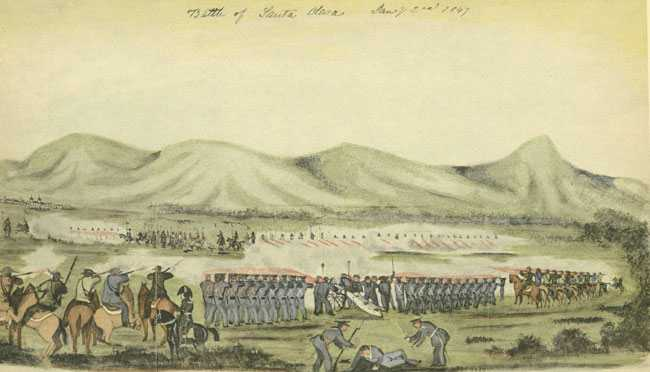
- U.S. Marines arriving in Santa Clara
Date	January 2, 1847
Location	Santa Clara, California
Result	American victory

Belligerents
Mexico	United States

Commanders and leaders
(Mexico) Francisco Sánchez	(United States) Ward Marston (United States) James F. Reed

Strength
80 Lanceros	120 volunteers, reinforced by U.S. Marines & Sailors

Casualties and losses
4 killed 5 wounded	2 wounded
- Sánchez surrendered January 6 to the Americans

The Battle of Santa Clara, nicknamed the "Battle of the Mustard Stalks", was a skirmish during the Mexican–American War, fought on January 2, 1847, 2 1/2 miles west of Mission Santa Clara de Asís in California.

In late December, the former Californio military commander of Yerba Buena and a rancher from the San Mateo peninsula, Francisco Sanchez, imprisoned the American Mayor of Yerba Buena, Washington Bartlett, and five of his men, who were all engaged in a foraging raid on the peninsula. After receiving the news of the abduction on December 29, Commodore Montgomery in San Francisco ordered Marine Captain Ward Marston to rescue Bartlett and his men. It was the only engagement of its type in Northern California during the war.

== Background ==
Californios were angry at United States immigrants settling on their ranchos. Six men of the U.S. sloop Warren, who had gone ashore to buy cattle from Mexicans for food, were taken hostage by a group under Francisco Sánchez. One of the hostages was Lieutenant Washington Allon Bartlett, the alcalde of Yerba Buena (soon to be renamed San Francisco). Captains Joseph Aram and Charles Maria Weber, commanding U.S. volunteers at Santa Clara and San Jose respectively, were sent to free them. Sánchez had command of 200 men, so U.S. marines and artillery under Captain Marston were dispatched as reinforcement. James F. Reed, acting lieutenant of the San Jose volunteer contingent, was in the area to muster a rescue party for his family, members of the Donner Party snowbound in the high Sierras. The war made volunteers hard for him to find.

== Battle ==
The Americans were in a mustard field in a dry creek when the Mexicans opened fire. Once the Americans reached open ground the fighting turned their way. An armistice was agreed after two hours, by which time four Mexicans were killed, with four Mexicans and two Americans injured. Tinkham writes, "The women stood on the housetops at Santa Clara and anxiously watched the battle. After the battle the regulars marched into the pueblo and were given a rousing reception and a dinner."

== Aftermath ==
The putative site of the "Armistice Oak" is marked beside El Camino Real near Lawrence Expressway. The Mexicans retreated to the Santa Cruz Mountains. On January 8, the Marines having arrived, Sánchez surrendered. The Americans did agree to respect the Californios' property.

== See also ==
- List of battles of the Mexican–American War
