= Jim Reid (disambiguation) =

Jim Reid (born 1961) is a Scottish musician and the lead singer of The Jesus and Mary Chain.

Jim Reid may also refer to:

- Jim Reid (American football) (born 1950), American football player and coach
- Jim Reid (Australian footballer) (1913–1983), Australian rules footballer for Claremont and South Melbourne
- Jim Reid (footballer, born 1912) (1912–1992), Australian rules footballer for North Melbourne
- Jim Reid (basketball) (born 1945), Philadelphia 76ers player
- Jim Reid (Canadian football) (born 1957), Ottawa Rough Riders player
- Jim Reid (folk musician) (1934–2009), Scottish singer/songwriter
- Jim Reid (offensive lineman) (born 1971), American football player

== See also ==
- Jim Reed (disambiguation)
- James Reid (disambiguation)
- Jim Read (disambiguation)
