= Jim Read =

Jim Read may refer to:

- Jim Read (alpine skier) (born 1962), Canadian former alpine skier
- Jim Read (footballer) (1943–2020), Australian rules footballer

== See also ==
- Jim Reid (disambiguation)
- Jim Reed (disambiguation)
