= James Reid =

Jim, Jimmy, Jamie or James Reid may refer to:

== Arts and entertainment ==
- Jim Reid (folk musician) (1934–2009), Scottish singer/songwriter
- James Earl Reid (1942–2021), American sculptor
- Jamie Reid (1947–2023), English décollage visual artist
- Jim Reid (born 1961), Scottish songwriter, lead singer of The Jesus and Mary Chain
- James Reid (New Zealand musician) (born 1974), lead singer of The Feelers
- James Reid (actor) (born 1993), Filipino-Australian actor, singer, dancer and reality-show contestant
  - James Reid (EP), 2013
- James "Rocky" Reid, American contestant of Survivor: Fiji

== Politicians ==
=== Canada ===
- James Reid (Canadian politician) (1839–1904), member for British Columbia in House of Commons and member of Senate
- James Reid (New Brunswick politician) (1839–1915), member for Restigouche in Canadian House of Commons
- James Reid (Ontario politician) (1848–1926), Canadian member of Legislative Assembly of Ontario
- James William Reid (1859–1933), Canadian member of Nova Scotia House of Assembly
- James Allan Reid (1897–1978), Canadian member of Legislative Assembly of British Columbia
- James Reid (Newfoundland politician) (1921–1991), Canadian member of Newfoundland House of Assembly

=== United Kingdom ===
- James Reid (Greenock MP) (1839–1908), British Member of Parliament for Greenock, 1900–1906
- James Reid, Baron Reid (1890–1975), Scottish lawyer, Conservative politician and judge
- Jimmy Reid (1932–2010), Scottish trade unionist

=== United States ===
- James Randolph Reid (1750–1789), American soldier and Continental Congressman
- James W. Reid (politician) (1849–1902), American congressman from North Carolina
- James W. Reid (mayor) (1917–1972), American mayor of Raleigh, North Carolina
- James L. Reid (1907–1985), American state representative and jurist from Maine

== Sportspeople ==
=== Footballers ===
- Jimmy Reid (footballer, born 1879) (1879–1976), Scottish inside-forward for Port Vale, West Ham United and Tottenham
- Jimmy Reid (footballer, born 1890) (1890–1938), Scottish centre forward for Lincoln City, Airdrieonians and Clydebank
- Jimmy Reid (footballer, born 1935) (1935–2017), Scottish footballer for Dundee United, Bury and Stockport County
- James Reid (footballer, born 1990), English midfielder
- Jamie Reid (footballer, born January 1994), Scottish footballer
- Jamie Reid (footballer, born July 1994), English-Northern Irish footballer for Stevenage

=== Football and rugby players ===
- James Reid (rugby, born 1851) (1851–1908), Scottish rugby player
- James Reid (rugby union, born 1876) (1876–1967), Scottish full back
- Jim Reid (footballer, born 1912) (1912–1992), Australian rules footballer for North Melbourne
- Jim Reid (Australian footballer) (1913–1983), Australian half forward for Claremont and South Melbourne
- Jim Reid (American football) (born 1950), American defensive back and coach
- Jim Reid (Canadian football) (born 1957), Ottawa Rough Riders running back

=== Other sportspeople ===
- James Reid (sport shooter) (1875–1957), British Olympic silver medalist
- James Reid (athlete) (1883–1935), Irish Olympic athlete
- Jim Reid (basketball) (born 1945), Philadelphia 76ers forward
- Jamie Reid (swimmer) (born 1983), American backstroke gold medalist
- James Reid (ice hockey) (born 1990), Canadian goaltender
- James Reid (cyclist) (born 1992), South African cross-country Olympian

== Writers ==
- James Seaton Reid (1798–1851), Irish Presbyterian minister and church historian
- James D. Reid (before 1810–after 1860), Scottish-born American superintendent of Magnetic Telegraph Company and historian of telegraph
- James Smith Reid (author) (1846–1926), English scholar and historian
- James Smith Reid (1849–1922), Australian newspaper owner, editor and businessman, a/k/a J. S. Reid
- Jimmy Reid (1932–2010), Scottish trade union activist, orator, politician and journalist
- Jamie Reid (poet) (1941–2015), Canadian writer, and arts organizer/activist

== Others ==
- Sir James Reid, 1st Baronet (1849–1923), Scottish physician-in-ordinary to Queen Victoria
- James H. Reid (1842–1919), American maritime pilot from Boston
- James R. Reid (1849–1937), Canadian-American Presbyterian minister
- James W. Reid (architect) (1851–1943), American architect of Hotel del Coronado and San Francisco Fairmont Hotel
- James Millar Reid, governor of Medomsley Detention Centre from 1976 to 1978

== See also ==
- James Reed (disambiguation)
- James Read (disambiguation)
- Jamie Reid (disambiguation)
- Jimmy Reid (disambiguation)
