= Jamie Reid (disambiguation) =

Jamie Reid (1947–2023) was an English artist.

Jamie Reid may also refer to:

- Jamie Reid (poet) (1941–2015), Canadian poet, writer, and arts organizer/activist
- Jamie Reid (footballer, born July 1994), English-Northern Irish footballer for Stevenage
- Jamie Reid (footballer, born January 1994), Scottish footballer
- Jamie Reid (swimmer) (born 1983), American backstroke swimmer

== See also ==
- James Reid (disambiguation)
- Jamie Reed (disambiguation)
