= Ximena McGlashan =

Entomologist, and a "butterfly farmer"

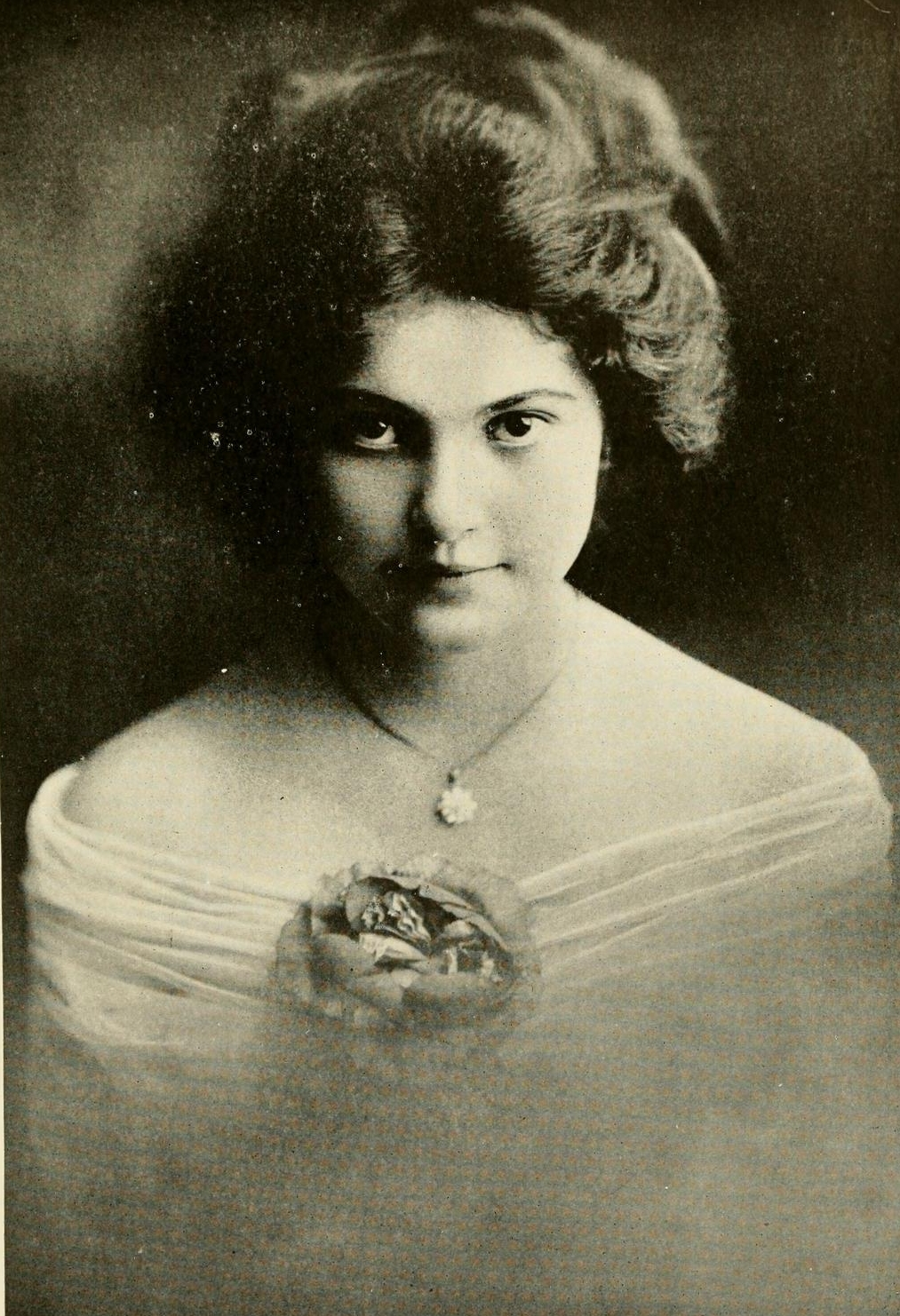
- Ximena McGlashan, c. 1913
- Born: Ximena Myrtle McGlashan; October 25, 1893; Truckee, California, US
- Died: June 24, 1986; Berkeley, California, US
- Resting place: Mountain View Cemetery
- Education: Stanford University
- Occupation: Entomologist

Ximena McGlashan (October 25, 1893 – June 24, 1986), later Ximena McGlashan Howard, was an American entomologist, and a "butterfly farmer" based in Truckee, California.

== Early life ==
Ximena Myrtle McGlashan was born in Truckee, California, sixth of the seven daughters of Charles Fayette McGlashan and Leonora Keiser McGlashan. Her father collected butterflies and moths, so Ximena had access to samples to study from a young age. She earned a teaching certificate at San Jose Normal School in 1911, but did not pursue a teaching career.

== Career ==
In 1911, Ximena McGlashan and her father started a business selling butterflies to collectors, which became the first commercial butterfly farm in the United States. She raised larvae in jars and boxes on the family property, and perfected her skills at preparing specimens for shipment. She promoted the idea as a profitable option for young rural women, because it required little investment to start, and no heavy physical work. She published a magazine for amateur entomologists, The Butterfly Farmer, in 1913 and 1914. "My greatest aim has been to inspire a love for the beautiful in entomology," she explained of her work. They opened a museum for the tourists who came to their house to see the butterflies.

Photograph of McGlashan taken in 1910.

A species of Limacodidae, Sibine ximenans, was named for Ximena McGlashan by entomologist Harrison Gray Dyar Jr.

From her butterfly farm earnings, she paid her way to enroll in the entomology program at the University of California Berkeley before transferring a year later to Stanford University, where she earned a degree in entomology in 1916.

Due to her marriage to John Carey Howard, Ximena was forced to drop her interests in studying butterflies further to support her husband as he was teaching survival tactics to troops at Fort Leavenworth in Kansas. Although she never pursued a career in entomology after graduating, she would eventually join the Xerces Society.

== Personal life and legacy ==
Ximena McGlashan eloped with John Carey Howard in 1916. They had two children, John Jr. and Jeanne. Howard became a professor of military science at University of California Berkeley. Ximena was widowed when John died in 1952. She died in 1986, aged 92 years.

The McGlashans' butterfly collection was held at the Nevada County Courthouse for many years. It was moved to Donner Memorial State Park, and in 2015 to the Truckee Community Recreation Center. Ximena McGlashan's papers are archived at the Joseph Research Library, Truckee-Donner Historical Society. The McGlashan Butterfly Foundation in Truckee funds scholarships and grants for local students interested in entomology.
