= Lewis Keseberg =

Survivor of the Donner Party (1814–1895)

- Ludwig Keseberg
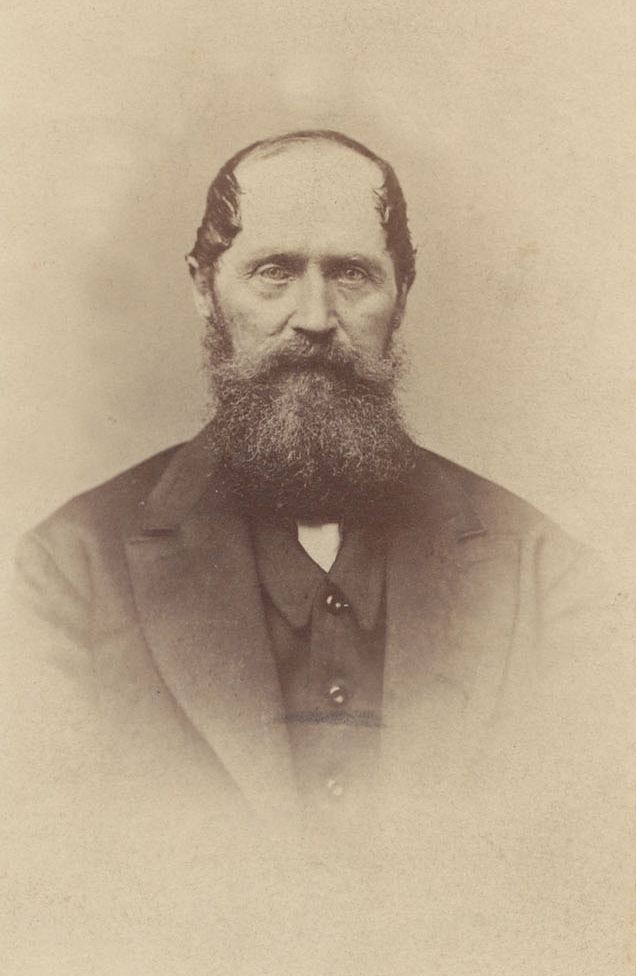
- Born: Ludwig Christian Keseberg; May 26, 1814; Berleburg, North Rhine-Westphalia, Grand Duchy of Hesse
- Died: 1895 (aged 81); Sacramento, California, United States
- Known for: Donner Party
- Spouse: Elisabeth Philippine Zimmermann (m. 1842; died 1877)
- Children: 11

Johann Ludwig Christian Keseberg (May 26, 1814 – 1895), also referred to as Lewis Keseberg, (Note: Also spelled as Keseburg, Keesburg or Kiesberg.) was a member of the Donner Party of 1846–1847. He was the last survivor to be rescued from the Donner campsite. His reputation and his involvement in cannibalism allowed him to be remembered as "the most infamous and vilified member of the Donner Party."

== Biography ==
Johann Ludwig Christian Keseberg was born in Bad Berleburg, In the Grand Duchy of Hesse, the son of a Lutheran minister. On June 22, 1842, Keseberg married the nineteen-year-old Elisabeth Philippine Zimmermann. Within a year, his wife gave birth to twin daughters Juliane Karoline "Ada" Keseberg and Mathilde Elise Keseberg. In 1844, the family left Hesse for New York City. Two months after their arrival, Mathilde died. The family then settled in Cincinnati, where Keseberg found work at a brewery. They then decided to move west, joining the Donner Party in 1846. Keseberg spoke German, English, and French, as well as some Spanish, and was "probably by far the most highly educated person in the company."

=== The Donner Party ===
The Kesebergs, consisting of Lewis (32), his wife Philippine (23) and their daughter Ada (3), joined the Donner Party with two wagons. They were accompanied by teamsters Karl "Dutch Charley" Burger (30) and a Belgian man whose forename is unknown, Hardkoop (60), and further joined by their associates Joseph Reinhardt (30) and Augustus Spitzer (30), and merchant Jacob Karl Wolfinger (26) and his wife Doris (20), all of whom were fellow Germans. During the journey, his wife gave birth to a boy, Lewis Keseberg Jr.

In September, during the difficult trek across the Great Salt Lake Desert, the Kesebergs had to leave one of their wagons behind. By October 7, Keseberg and his wife, carrying their newborn, were walking to lighten the wagon's load. Keseberg's driver, Hardkoop, was unable to walk, and was left behind by Keseberg. Nobody could take Hardkoop, and he was last seen sitting by the road completely worn out.

Keseberg was an unpopular member of the party. The Kesebergs, being immigrants, were subjected to some discrimination. Keseberg was alleged to have verbally and physically abused his wife, and was rumored by James Reed, who greatly disliked him, to have possibly stolen buffalo robes from a Native American grave while travelling on the Platte River. James Breen, a member of the party, noted that Keseberg was "quick tempered and irritable." Keseberg's friend, Heinrich Lienhard, wrote before Keseberg's departure that "Keseberg's greatest weakness was his unbridled temper... After his anger had subsided, he always realized his mistake and was extremely penitent." Keseberg was also subject to being disliked by the other members of the party due to his threatening actions. Keseberg would "lustfully stalk innocent children" of the party. In addition to this, Keseberg would often declare to other members that he enjoyed human flesh, even going to the point of making remarks like "I would like to eat a piece of you" to members.

It is important to note that these ideas of Keseberg come from the thoughts and experiences of other party members. As noted earlier, Keseberg was an immigrant so he already faced some aggression from other members. It is possible that these ideas of Keseberg were emphasized due to his immigration status. In fact, in his 1879 interview with McGlashan, Keseberg directly rejected the rumors that he enjoyed human flesh exclaiming "I can not describe the unutterable repugnance with which I tasted the first mouthful of flesh". Even describing his experiences as horrible and revolting.

=== Snowbound ===
In the winter of 1846–1847, unable to proceed in the snow, members of the Donner Party camped at Truckee Lake. Keseberg's foot was injured from an earlier hunting accident. This wound was a gash in his heel, nearly severing it from his foot, caused by a misplaced axe strike. This would heal very slowly, causing excruciating pain to walk even by the departure of the Third Relief. The Kesebergs were thus unable to build a proper cabin. Keseberg and other German immigrants built a lean-to shed against the Breen cabin. On January 24, Keseberg's infant son, Lewis Keseberg Jr., died. He was buried in a snowbank by his mother.

A relief party arrived in February. Keseberg's wife Philippine, carrying their daughter Ada, left the camp with the relief party. Ada died on the journey, and was buried by rescuers Reason Tucker and Daniel Rhoads in the snow. Keseberg stayed in the camp due to the incapacitating axe injury to his foot, and he moved into the cabin of the Murphy family.

The second relief party arrived near the end of February, which found Keseberg "lying in pain in his own excrement." His wound was cared for, and the rescuers left behind some food.

The third relief party arrived on March 13. The rescuers included William Eddy and William Foster, who were previously themselves survivors of the Donner Party. At the campsite, they found Foster's mother-in-law Levinah Murphy, who told them their young sons, James Eddy and George Foster, were dead and had been cannibalized by the survivors. Murphy accused Keseberg of killing George Foster, but Keseberg vehemently denied the accusations. Keseberg confessed to Eddy that he had cannibalized his son. Eddy swore to murder Keseberg if they ever met in California. Keseberg, still nursing his foot, did not leave with the relief party, and stayed in the campsite along with Murphy and Tamsen Donner who refused to abandon her ailing husband, George, whose arm had become black with infection that travelled up from a seemingly minor cut.

The fourth relief party arrived on April 21, and apparently found Keseberg, the only survivor, wrapped in a blanket, surrounded by human bones and next to a pot of what appeared to be fresh human liver and lungs. Keseberg confessed to cannibalizing the other survivors after their deaths, but when the rescuers accused him of murdering Tamsen Donner, Keseberg insisted that she died naturally after getting lost in the snow on the path from the Alder Creek camp to the lake cabins. According to Keseberg, George Donner finally succumbed to his illness, and Tamsen Donner planned to make the journey through the mountains to reunite with her daughters. Because she took too long getting to the lake cabin, she succumbed to the cold not long after arriving. He said that she had eventually found his cabin, and that he tried to warm her with blankets and a fire, but that she was dead and cold when he woke in the morning. Keseberg had also hidden Tamsen's money. The rescuers believed that Keseberg stole the Donners' money, but Keseberg claimed that Tamsen had told him to take the money to her children, and that he planned to do so, having no reason to trust these men. William Fallon, a rescuer, also alleged that Keseberg had stated that Donner's flesh was "the best he had ever tasted," which Keseberg would fervently deny. Nonetheless, Keseberg was allowed to leave with the rescuers. On his way to Sutter's Fort, Keseberg discovered the body of his daughter Ada. Keseberg arrived at Sutter's Fort on April 29, 1847, and was the last survivor of the party to be rescued. Recent studies have attempted to re-examine the popular narrative surrounding the Donner Party, specifically their behaviors. Researchers note that most of the reputation of party members was caused by rumors. Evidence from camp sites such as tea cups and dinner plates suggest typical 19th century etiquette in the camp sites. Researchers explain to understand Keseberg's actions we must evaluate him within the context of 19th century social norms. Researchers have not yet proved if these rumors are true or false.

=== Later life ===
His reputation and actions in the Donner Party caused many to speak against him. Members of the fourth relief party spread shocking and gruesome tales about Keseberg which involved some exaggeration, and this image of Keseberg held sway in common lore. Keseberg was vilified as a cannibal, and accused of being a thief and a murderer. Keseberg eventually sued Edward "Ned" Coffeemeyer, one of his own rescuers, for defamation. Keseberg won but was only awarded one dollar. He was never charged for any crimes. Eddy did attempt to follow up on his promise to find and kill Keseberg, but was persuaded otherwise by fellow survivor James F. Reed.

Immediately after his rescue, Keseberg worked briefly for John Sutter, captaining the schooner Sacramento, taking wheat to San Francisco. It was said by passengers that Keseberg would cry out in his sleep. Heinrich Lienhard claimed that Sutter fired Keseberg as captain because passengers complained that the boat traveled so slowly that Keseberg might kill sleeping passengers for food.

Keseberg later made some money during the California Gold Rush, and in 1851 was able to buy and operate a small hotel, The Lady Adams, in Sacramento. The hotel enjoyed some successes, but it burned down a year later. In 1853, Keseberg purchased an old bar and restaurant, and converted it to the Phoenix Brewery. Business in the brewery thrived and it is considered the first brewery to introduce lagers to Sacramento. Before this, lager was generally limited to the Pennsylvania Dutch and associates. The brewery was destroyed in the Great Flood of 1862. Keseberg then opened a distillery in Calistoga for his friend Samuel Brannan, before returning to Sacramento.

Keseberg and his wife would have eight more children, all daughters. His wife Philippine died in 1877. In 1879, Keseberg was interviewed by Charles Fayette McGlashan. McGlashan wrote that Keseberg was afflicted by "misery and desolation," and was struggling to care for his daughters, two of whom had intellectual disabilities. Keseberg said that he was tormented by the accusations and rumors, and asserted that he was innocent of murder of Tamsen Donner. Keseberg told McGlashan:

I have often been accused of taking her life. Before my God, I swear this is untrue! Do you think a man would be such a miscreant, such a damnable fiend, such a caricature on humanity, as to kill this lone woman? There were plenty of corpses lying around. He would only add one more corpse to the many!

McGlashan believed in Keseberg's innocence, and later arranged a meeting between Keseberg and Eliza Poor Donner Houghton, the youngest daughter of Tamsen Donner who survived the Donner Party when she was four. Keseberg swore that he was innocent, and Houghton chose to believe Keseberg. According to McGlashan, he embraced Houghton, weeping, and his conviction, his tears were so genuine that they convinced McGlashlan, who, before meeting Keseberg, believed him to be guilty.

Keseberg eventually would outlive all of his daughters save for one. He became penniless and homeless, and died in the Sacramento County Hospital, a hospital for the poor, in 1895. His grave has never been found.
