= Tamsen Donner =

American pioneer

- Born: Tamsen Eustis; November 1, 1801; Newburyport, Massachusetts
- Died: March 1847 (aged 45); Truckee Lake, California
- Cause of death: Exposure
- Known for: Participation in Donner Party
- Spouse: George Donner (m. 1839)
- Children: Frances Eustis Donner; Georgia Ann Donner; Eliza P. Donner Houghton

Tamsen Eustis Dozier Donner (November 1, 1801 – March 1847) was an American pioneer, most notable for her key role as a member of the infamous Donner Party. Donner was described as having been "a little woman" and "a good shot with a pistol". As the party encountered worsening conditions, she repeatedly refused to leave her dying husband, George Donner. She subsequently became the last victim to perish in the ordeal and possibly the last to be cannibalized.

== Early life ==
=== Massachusetts and Maine ===
Donner was born Tamsen Eustis on November 1, 1801, in Newburyport, Massachusetts to William Eustis and Tamesin Wheelwright, the youngest of seven children. Only two of her siblings, Elizabeth "Betsey" Eustis Poor and William Eustis, lived to adulthood. She began teaching at age fifteen, a career that would take her across the country. Donner moved to Maine at some point after 1817 and worked as a school teacher. Letters to her sister, Betsy, indicate she worked and lived in Boobartown, Wells, and Williamsburg. Reporting on her work in Williamsburg, Donner states that she has "a convenient school house, pleasantly situated, (and) board(s) in a remarkably agreeable family".

=== North Carolina ===
Donner moved to North Carolina in 1824 to find better work as a schoolteacher. A Miss Eustis is recorded as having taught the Elizabeth City Academy's "female department" in 1827. In December 1829, she married Tully Dozier, postmaster, and they had a son soon after. Donner's son died on September 28, 1831, followed by a premature daughter on November 18. Her husband died the same year on December 24. Due to the loss of her family in such a short period, Donner became deeply depressed and was plagued with nightmares. Despite this, Donner was able to support herself. When her brother, William, offered to take care of her, Donner said "I am abundantly able at present to take care of myself and to supply every necessary and unnecessary want."

=== Illinois ===
Some time between September 1836 and February 1837, Donner moved to Illinois. There she again worked as a schoolteacher, and sporadically taught and cared for her brother's children. Donner met George Donner, a local farmer and her future husband, in Springfield, Illinois. They courted and were married May 24, 1839. Donner had three children with her husband: Frances Eustis (1840), Georgia Ann (1841), and Eliza (1843). Donner started a "reading society" at her home, the purpose of which changed at one point so Donner "might read to those assembled the publications which had kindled in (George and Jacob Donner) the desire to migrate to the land so alluringly described". Donner seemed to enjoy her life in Illinois, writing to her sister saying "I am as happy as I can reasonably expect in this changing world."

== Participation in the Donner Party ==
=== Early journey ===
George and Jacob Donner, Tamsen Donner's husband and brother-in-law, respectively, decided to migrate to California. According to her daughter, Eliza Houghton, Tamsen Donner "was in accord with my father's wishes, and helped him to carry out his plan." Houghton recalls that her mother "was energetic in all these preparations, but her special province was to make and otherwise get in readiness a bountiful supply of clothing". Donner also collected supplies for a women's school that she hoped to open in California. The Donners brought with them their five daughters still living with them, including Tamsen's three daughters and two of George Donner's daughters from a previous marriage.

In the early days of their migration, Donner read and practiced botany along the trip, finding tulips, primrose, lupine, "the ear-drop", larkspur, creeping hollyhock, and an unidentified “beautiful flower". Her daughter Eliza recalled that Donner also "made pencil and watercolor studies" of the flowers. Donner spent a large portion of her time cooking, using flour, rice, beans, cornmeal, and meat.

Tamsen Donner wrote letters to The Springfield Journal documenting their travel, two of which survive. Her first letter is dated June 16, 1846, and was published on July 23. After traveling 450 miles, Donner was optimistic, writing, "If I do not experience something far worse than I have yet done, I shall say the trouble is all in getting started." Donner reported liking the Indians she met, stating that, "All are so friendly that I cannot help feeling sympathy and friendship for them." Donner also described the traveling party, writing that, “We have [some] of the best people in our company, and some, too, that are not so good." Donner reported that she was able to "botanize and read some, but cook[ed] ‘heaps’ more". In her second letter, Donner updates the journal on the position of the party, stating "To-morrow we cross the river, and, by reckoning, will be over 200 miles from Fort Laramie, where we intend to stop and repair our wagon wheels."

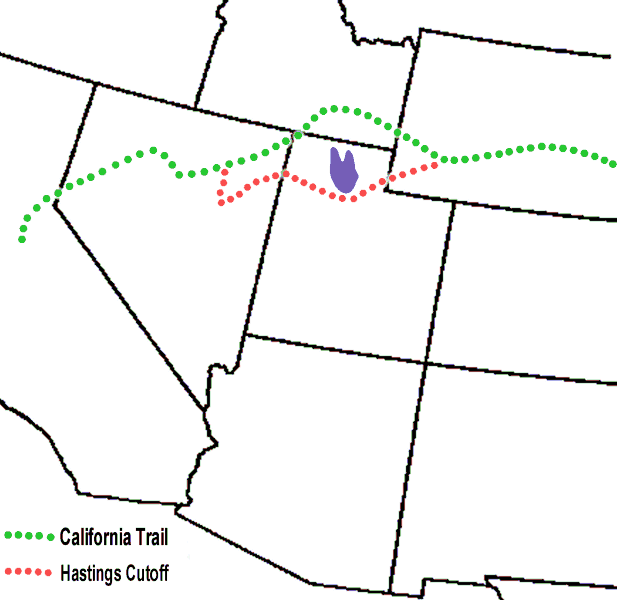
The Hastings Cutoff path that the Donner Party used and Tamsen Donner was wary of.

While the rest of the party decided to trust the promises of Lansford Hastings and his "Hastings Cutoff," Tamsen Donner was wary of the gamble of trusting Hastings on his word. No one had actually met Hastings, and the route they chose was a matter of life and death.

George and Tamsen Donner took Luke Halloran, a young businessman headed west in search of better health, into the Donner Party. Halloran became ill along the route, and Tamsen Donner took on the role of watching over and caring for him. "Despite my mother's unwearying ministrations," Eliza Donner recalled, "death came on the fourth of September.”

When the party reached the Utah desert, Tamsen Donner found and reassembled a torn note presumably written by Hastings. Once reassembled, the note read "2 days—2 nights—hard driving—cross—desert—reach water." Donner believed the reason the note was torn was that crows had pecked and torn at it.

=== Separation ===
Over the course of the journey, some families in the Donner Party moved faster than others, resulting in the group separating into smaller sections. The two Donner families lagged to the rear of the party at large, and after a heavy snowstorm they were left seven miles behind the rest of the party at Alder Creek. Tamsen Donner wanted to continue onward into the mountains but was overruled by George and Jacob Donner, who decided to set up camp at Alder Creek. While stuck, Donner would brush her daughters' hair daily while telling them Bible stories. She also wrote, sketched, knit, and sewed, all while telling her daughters the stories "of 'Joseph in Egypt,' of 'Daniel in the den of lions,' of 'Elijah healing the widow's son'". Donner's daughter, Georgia, later recalled of this time that Tamsen had said "that we children had not had a dry garment on in more than a week, and that she did not know what to do about it".

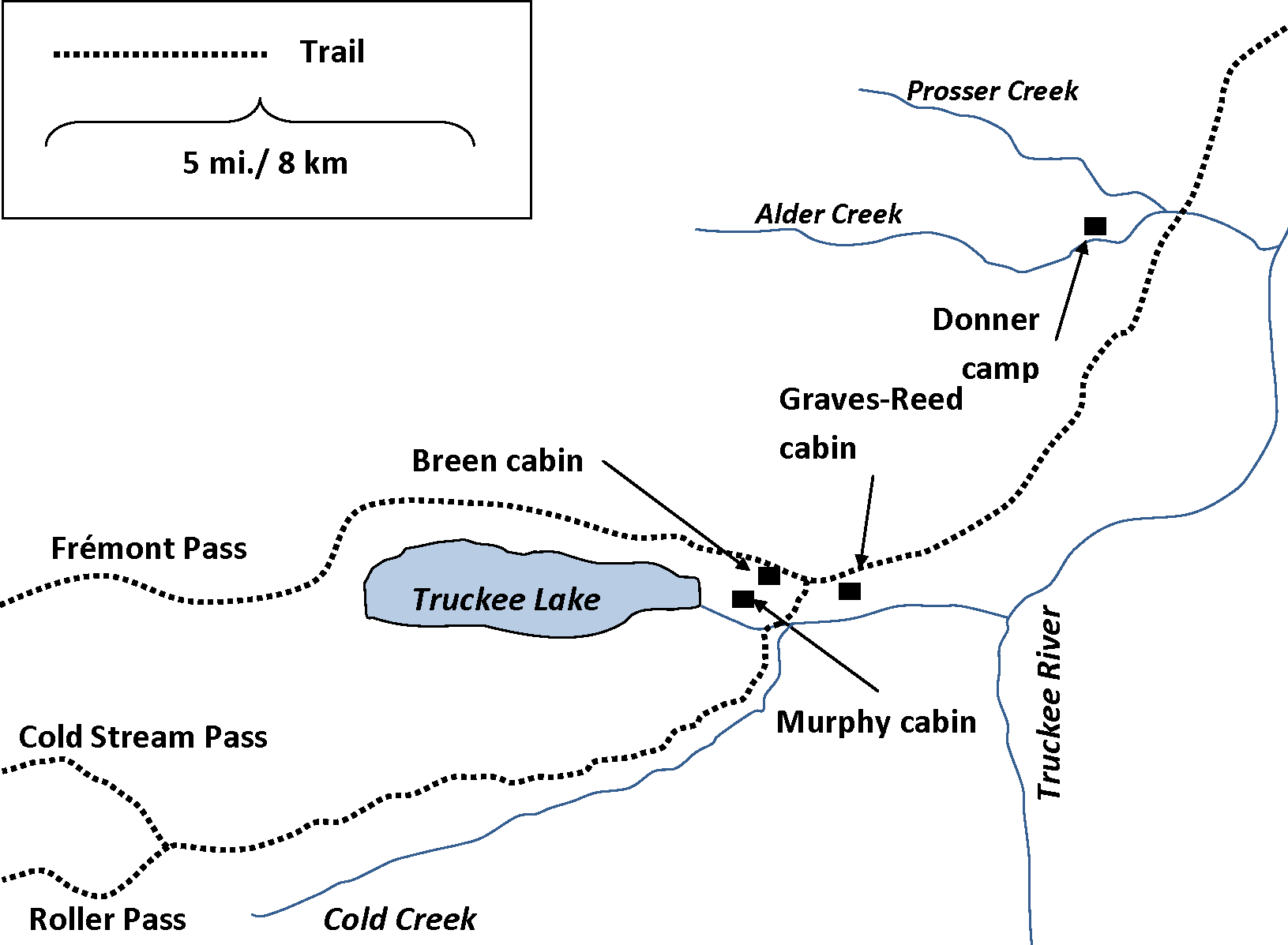
Map showing the location of the Alder Creek camp, where Tamsen Donner and her family stayed, and the lake cabins, where the rest of the party stayed.

=== First relief ===
While repairing a broken wagon axle with his brother, George Donner seriously injured his hand with a chisel. This injury became infected, later leaving him too ill to move. Tamsen Donner cared for her husband in his illness, and her daughter Eliza recalled her sitting "by his side, with a basin of warm water upon her lap, laving the wounded and inflamed parts very tenderly, with a strip of frayed linen wrapped around a little stick". When the first rescue party arrived to the Alder Creek camp, Tamsen Donner refused to leave her husband, and instead sent her two stepdaughters, Elitha and Leanna, with the rescue party. Donner gave the girls a blanket to use on the trek to safety. Recalling the morale of the Alder Creek camp after the first relief left, Eliza Donner stated that Betsy Donner, Jacob Donner's wife, often prayed with Tamsen Donner "for strength to bear their burdens". One day, Tamsen Donner reported having seen bear tracks near the camp, and suggested that they hunt it for meat.

=== Second relief ===
Upon the arrival of the second relief, George Donner was still too weak to move. Tamsen Donner again refused to leave her husband, stating that she was determined "to remain and care for him until both should be rescued, or death should part them". James Reed, a former party member returned as a rescuer, told Donner that another rescue was on the way. This, and the fact that the second relief was already overloaded with survivors, led her to decide to keep her daughters with her a little while longer.

After the departure of the second relief, Tamsen Donner made a deal that Charles Cady and Charles Stone would take her daughters to safety for a fee. Donner may have proposed the same deal to Reed, but was declined due to the second relief already being full. Before Cady and Stone took the girls, Tamsen Donner said to them "I may never see you again, but God will take care of you." Cady and Stone did not keep their promise of taking the girls to safety, and instead abandoned them at the Breen cabin where Lewis Keseberg and Levinah Murphy resided. Nicholas Clark, a rescuer charged to stay with the Donner camp, discovered that the girls had not been delivered to safety after all. After Clark notified Tamsen Donner of the betrayal, she hesitantly left the bedside of her dying husband to head to the lake in order to make arrangements for her daughters. John Baptiste Trudeau, a worker brought on by George Donner that had stayed to care for the Donner family, disputes this, telling Eliza Donner "It is true, but Clark did not return to report to your mother. She went over to Keseberg's Camp and, found you there. I staid with your father while she was gone. She was away two days." Before she left for the lake, Trudeau recalls "[Tamsen Donner] wrote every day and kept account of every thing that happened. Sometimes she used to read to me at night what she had written. If her papers had been saved they would be very valuable to you."

=== Third relief ===
When the third relief arrived, Tamsen Donner still refused to leave her husband as long as he lived. William Eddy, a party survivor returned rescuer, recounts that Tamsen Donner said "she would not consent to leave him while he survived". Eddy also states that Donner expressed "the greatest solicitude for her children, and informed Mr. Eddy that she had fifteen hundred dollars in silver, all of which she would give him, if he would save the lives of the children… the last words uttered by Mrs. Donner in tears and sobs to Mr. Eddy were, 'Oh, save, save my children!'" After arranging the girls departure with the rescue party, she returned to Alder Creek to care for George Donner. This would be the last time Tamsen Donner's daughters would see her. Recalling saying goodbye, Georgia Donner said "There was hardly time for words or action, and none for tears." Eliza Donner remembered that they "listened to the sound of her voice, felt her good-bye kisses, and watched her hasten away to father, over the snow, through the pines, and out of sight, and knew that we must not follow".

== Death ==
The exact circumstances in which Tamsen Donner died are unknown and highly contested. Both accounts of the events before, during, and after her death agree that in March 1847, after George Donner finally died from his illness, Tamsen made her way over to Lewis Keseberg's cabin and died shortly after. Before leaving, Donner wrapped her husband's body in a sheet as some semblance of a burial.

William Fallon, leader of the group sent to salvage the property of the Donner Party, paints a grisly scene. Fallon reported that Lewis Keseberg told them he was the lone survivor left at the camp. Fallon also states that Keseberg said Donner had gotten lost on her way from the Alder creek camp to the lake cabins, spent too long outside in the snow, barely made it to the cabin he was occupying, and died soon after. Fallon's account alleges that Keseberg cannibalized Donner, and stated that her flesh was "the best he had ever tasted." This account is highly contested, with author Ethan Rarick calling it "at best, half true".

Keseberg's account states that Tamsen arrived at his cabin late one night, saying that her husband, George Donner, had died, and that she intended to cross the mountains alone. She refused to eat the cannibalized remains Keseberg offered her, and she was dead by the next morning. Keseberg denies accusations that he enjoyed the cannibalization of Tamsen Donner, and states that he promised her that he would retrieve the Donners' money and save it for the surviving children. Keseberg claims to have tried to keep that promise, though Fallon and his men demanded it as payment for their efforts.

All five of George Donner's children in the Donner party survived the ordeal, including Tamsen Donner's three daughters. Tamsen Donner's body was never recovered.
