= James Ready =

James Ready may refer to:

- James Ready (beer), a Canadian beer brand
- James Ready, founder of American software company MontaVista
- Jim Ready, member of British musical group Trash Fashion

== See also ==
- James Reidy (1890–1963), Irish politician
