= Jimmy Reid (footballer, born 1935) =

Scottish footballer

Personal information
- Full name: James Provan Reid
- Date of birth: 14 December 1935
- Place of birth: Dundee, Scotland
- Date of death: 9 October 2017 (aged 81)
- Place of death: Dundee, Scotland
- Position: Inside forward

Senior career*
Years	Team	Apps	(Gls)
- Dundee St Joseph's
1955–1957	Dundee United	44	(16)
1957–1959	Bury	21	(9)
1959	Stockport County	11	(2)
1959	Dundee United	7	(1)
1959–1960	East Fife	13	(5)
1960–1961	Arbroath	9	(4)
1961–1962	Brechin City	15	(4)
Total		120	(41)
- * Club domestic league appearances and goals

James Provan Reid (14 December 1935 – 9 October 2017) was a Scottish footballer who played as an inside forward for clubs including Dundee United, Bury and Stockport County.

== Playing career ==
Born in Dundee, Jimmy Reid played junior football for Dundee St Joseph's. He made his Scottish Football League debut for Dundee United in March 1955, playing as a trialist against Hamilton Academical and then signing for the club immediately afterwards. He was a regular for the next two years until he was transferred to Football League club Bury in January 1957. He then joined Stockport County in March 1959 before returning to Dundee United in August 1959. Three months later he joined East Fife, later going on to play for Arbroath and Brechin City as well as junior teams.

== After football ==
After retiring as a player, Reid opened a shop in the Seagate area of Dundee, which he ran for almost fifty years. He died in a Dundee care home in October 2017 aged 81, having suffered from dementia.
