= Charles Fayette McGlashan =

American politician

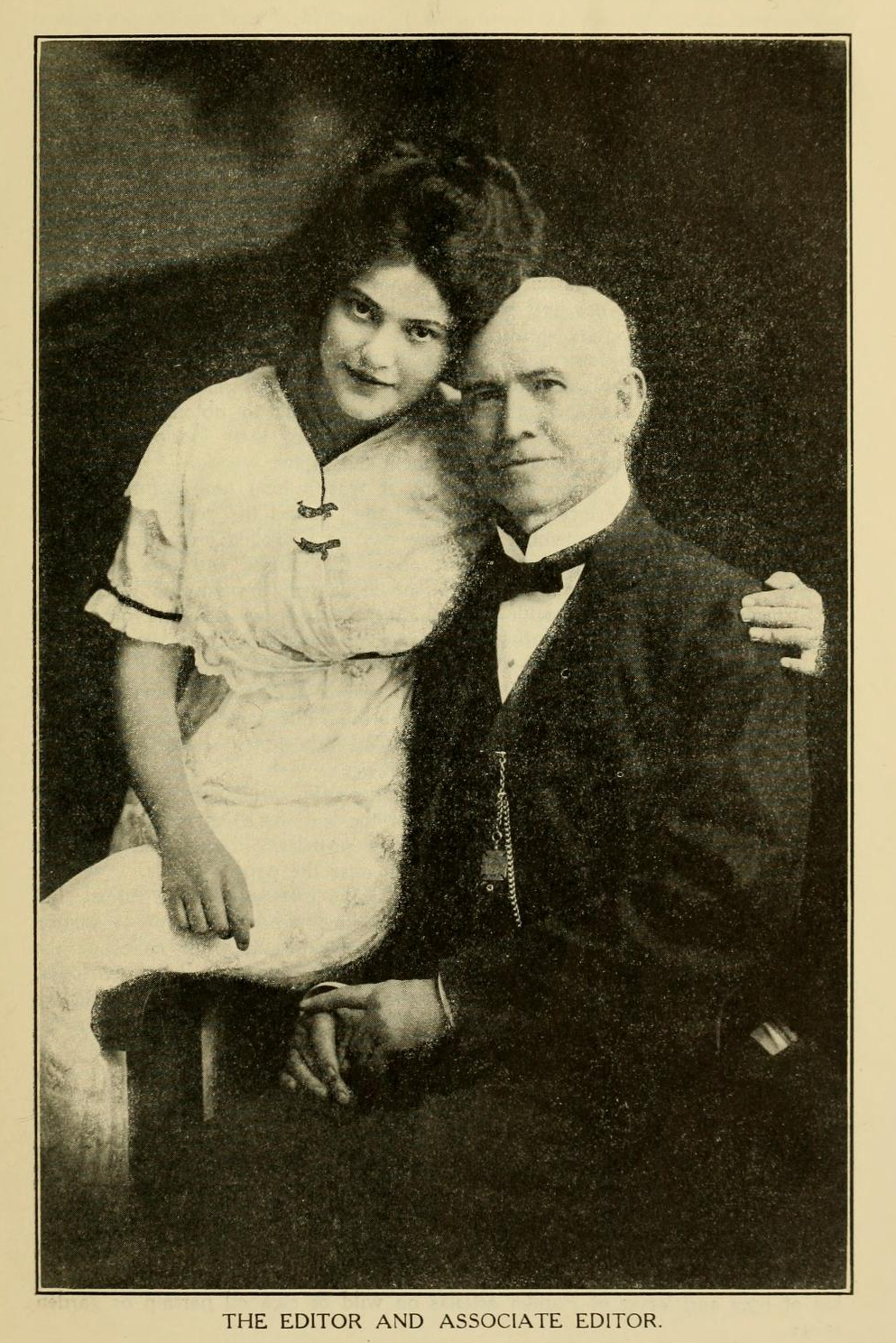
Charles McGlashan with daughter Ximena c. 1913

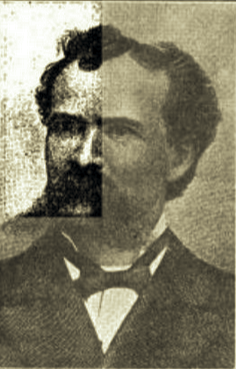
McGlashan in 1880

Charles Fayette McGlashan (12 August 1847 – 6 January 1931) was an American writer, historian, journalist, educator, lawyer, amateur entomologist and astronomer. He was also a Republican who took an active role in Sinophobic movements in Truckee, California in the 1880s. McGlashan Point overlooking Donner Lake is named after him.

== Early life ==
McGlashan was born in Beaver Dam, Wisconsin and his family moved to Placerville in 1854. He was educated at Sotoyme Institute, Healdsburg, California until 1865 and at the Williston Seminary in Massachusetts from 1868 to 1870. McGlashan first married Jennie Munson in 1871 and after a divorce, married Leonora Keiser in 1879.

== Career ==
McGlashan settled in Truckee around 1872, where he became a principal of schools from 1874. He later became a correspondent for the Sacramento Record in Utah, writing about the Mountain Meadows Massacre of 1857 and the arrest of John D. Lee. He trained in law and became editor and owner of the Truckee Republican.

=== Truckee Method ===
Elected into the California State Assembly in 1885 for his leadership in anti-Chinese actions, one of McGlashan's actions was in the boycott of Chinese workers into the town. He formed the Truckee Anti-Chinese Boycotting Committee which adopted the resolution: "We recognize the Chinese as an unmitigated curse to the Pacific Coast and a direct threat to the bread and butter of the working class”. They refused to sell any material to Chinese immigrants for two months. The so-called Truckee Method which included vigilante action by the "Caucasian League", blowing up water tanks in Chinatowns and boycott led to the Chinese leaving Truckee around 1886. McGlashan wrote an article in his newspaper titled "The Cue Klux Klan" in which he suggested that rewards could be offered for people to cut the ponytails off Chinamen that were then pinned up in the middle of town as warnings. He became a chairman of the "Anti-Chinese League" in San Jose, and of the San Francisco-based "State Anti-Chinese Non-Partisan Association".

== Butterfly Farmer ==
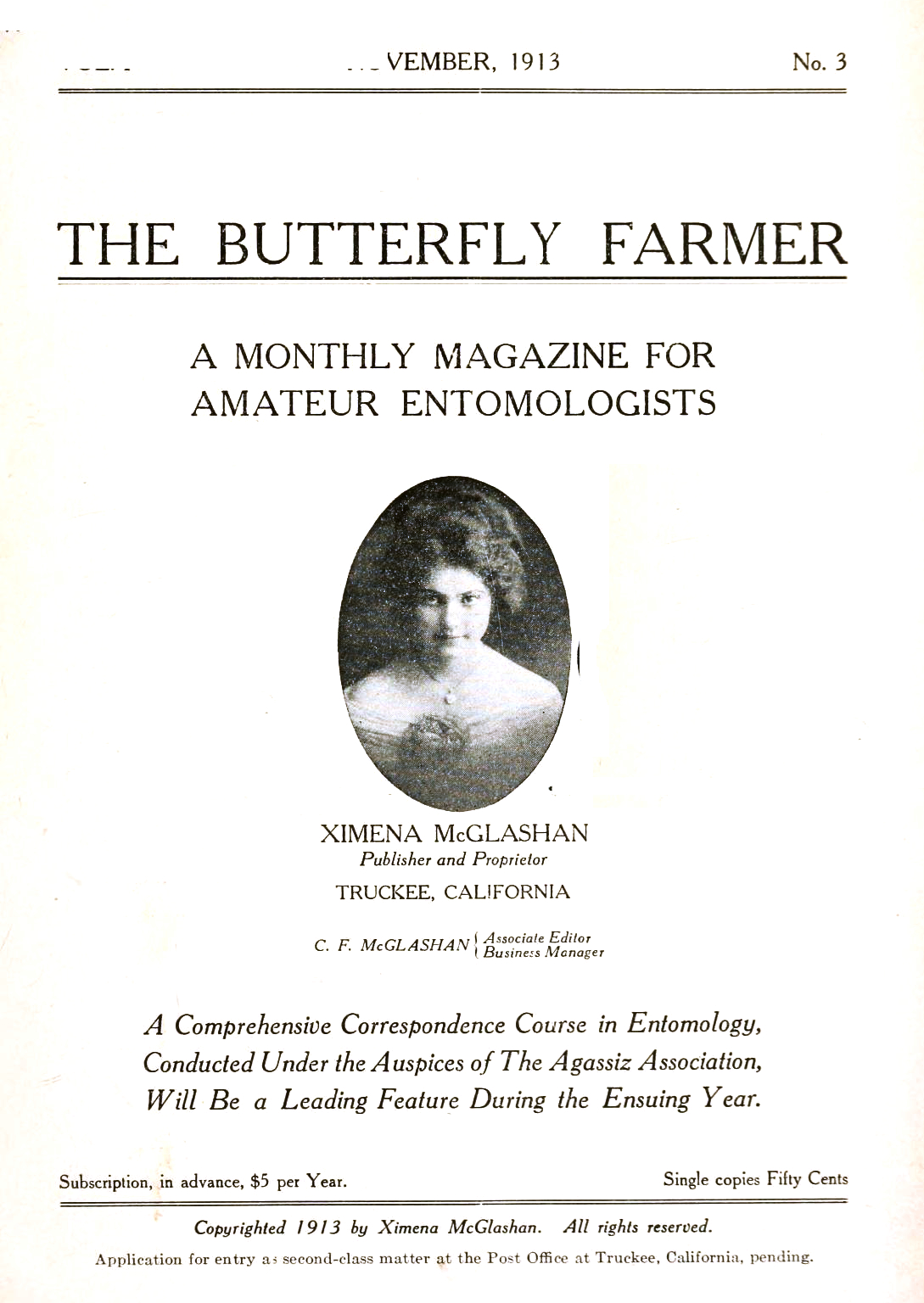
Cover of The Butterfly Farmer with picture of daughter Ximena

With daughter Ximena McGlashan, McGlashan began a butterfly farm and a magazine called the Butterfly Farmer around 1913. Euphydryas chalcedona macglashanii originally described as Melitaea macglashanii by J.J. Rivers was named after him. Twelve issues of the Butterfly Farmer were produced. One of their publications was a list of the local butterflies published in 1914 which included 86 taxa. About 15 species were considered to have disappeared due to climatic warming and several others due to deforestation while some are thought to have been collected further afield and mislabeled as being from Truckee.

== Personal life ==
McGlashan was the maternal grandfather, through his daughter June, of Douglas Kelley, who was the chief psychiatrist at Nuremberg Prison during the first months of the Nuremberg trials in 1945.

== Publications ==
McGlashan wrote History of the Donner Party (1879), which went into several editions.

== Hall of Fame ==
In 1968, McGlashan was posthumously inducted into the California Newspaper Hall of Fame.
