= James F. Reed =

Irish-born American businessman (1800–1874)

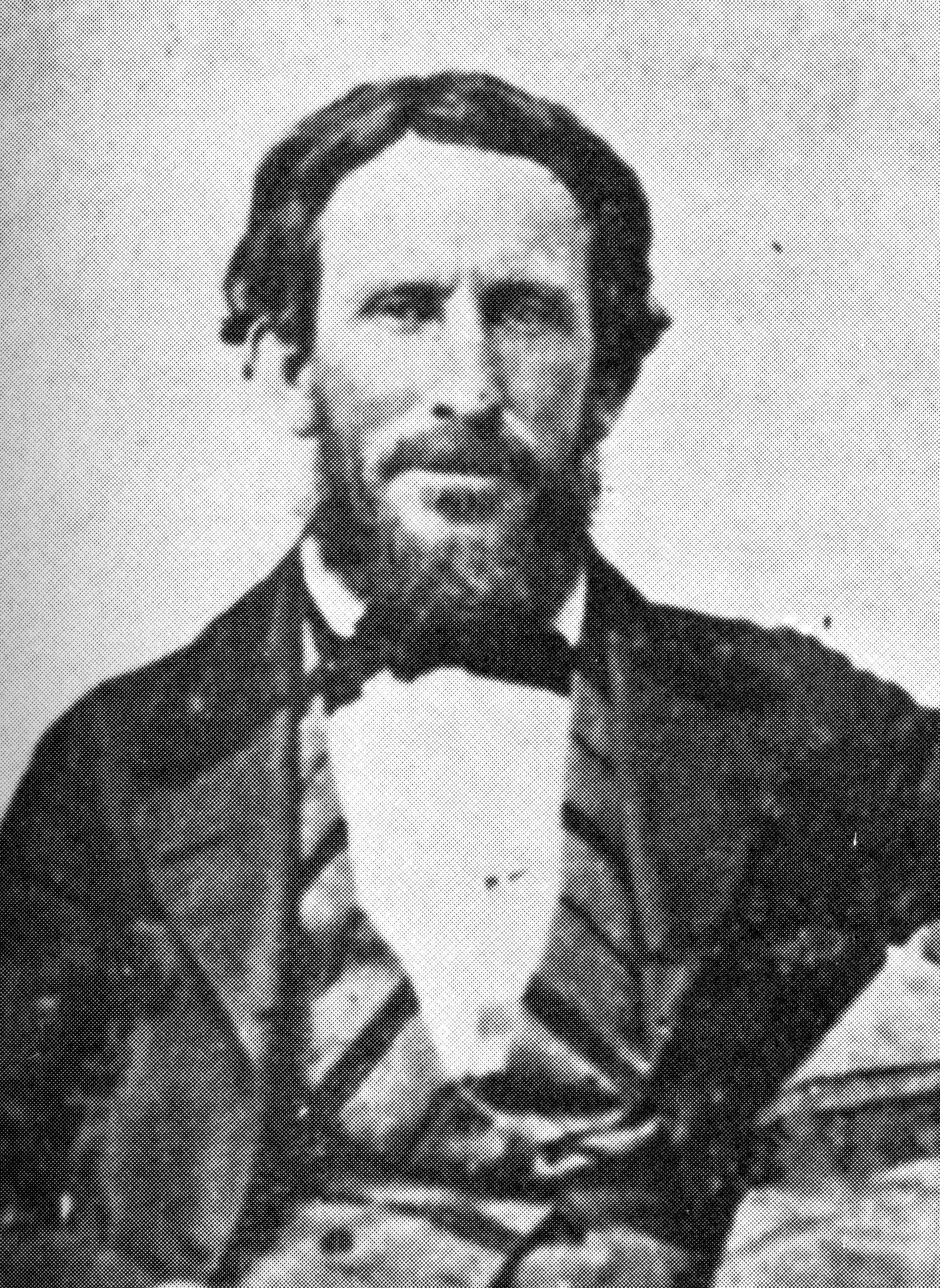
- Born: James Frazier Reed; November 14, 1800; County Armagh, Kingdom of Ireland
- Died: July 24, 1874 (aged 73); San Jose, California, U.S.
- Resting place: Oak Hill Cemetery; San Jose, California, U.S.
- Occupations: Businessman, soldier, pioneering settler in California
- Known for: Donner Party
- Spouse: Margret Wilson Backenstoe (née Keyes)
- Children: 6
- Relatives: John Marion Murphy (stepson-in-law)

James Frazier Reed (November 14, 1800 – July 24, 1874) was an Irish-born American businessman, soldier and pioneer in the American West, notable for being an organizing member of the ill-fated Donner Party emigration to California in 1846.

== Early life ==
James Frazier Reed was born in County Armagh, Kingdom of Ireland (now Northern Ireland). Reed emigrated with his mother to the United States after the death of his father. Once there, his mother sent him to live with a family member in Virginia, where he worked as a clerk in the family store. In about 1825, Reed moved to Illinois, where he took an interest in mining. While living there, Reed ran several businesses and took part in the Black Hawk War of 1832, serving with Abraham Lincoln.

In 1835, he married Margret Backenstoe (née Margret Wilson Keyes), a widow with one daughter, Virginia Elizabeth Backenstoe, whom Reed did not adopt but who nonetheless went by the name Virginia Reed. The couple married and had four children in Springfield: Martha Jane (called Patty); James F., Jr.; Thomas Keyes; and Gershom Francis, who died as an infant.

== Donner Party ==
In 1845, Reed decided to head west to California and organized a small group, which left the Springfield, Illinois area in April 1846. The other members were George Donner, his brother Jacob, and their families and hired hands. Each head of household had three wagons. In addition to two supply wagons, Reed had a particularly comfortable one made for his family to ride in, which has since become legendary. The Reeds and Donners left Springfield on April 14 and joined a large wagon train led by William H. Russell on May 19.

While camped in Wyoming, the Reeds, Donners, and several other families decided to split off from the main trail and take a new route called the Hastings Cutoff, which had been advertised as a shortcut across the Great Basin. They elected George Donner captain, creating the Donner Party, and separated from the other emigrants on July 20. The new route proved painstakingly slow and arduous. While crossing the desert west of the Great Salt Lake, Reed abandoned two of his wagons after he lost most of his oxen. The exhausted Donner Party finally rejoined the California Trail on September 26 near Elko, Nevada, having taken three weeks longer than the traditional route.

On October 6, while traveling along the Humboldt River, Reed quarreled with two men and, in the ensuing fight, stabbed John Snyder to death. One member of the traveling party proposed hanging Reed, but after Reed's wife pleaded for leniency, the other emigrants decided to banish him instead. Reed initially refused to accept their decision but eventually agreed to go ahead to Sutter's Fort, in the Sacramento Valley, for supplies. After a difficult journey during which he nearly starved, Reed reached the fort on October 28. After two days of rest, he attempted to take provisions back to the wagon train, but deep snow blocked the way.

The early onset of winter not only blocked Reed's return but also trapped the Donner Party in the Sierra Nevada. The Donner Party members contrived makeshift shelters, hoping to soon resume their journey, but were forced to spend the winter in the mountains. They were already low on supplies and were compelled to slaughter their oxen for food. As the winter wore on, many of the emigrants starved to death, and some resorted to cannibalism.

Meanwhile, Reed, now stuck in California, tried to organize another relief expedition, but turmoil from the Mexican–American War not only disrupted his efforts but also forced him to take up arms. On January 2, 1847, Reed participated in the Battle of Santa Clara. While in the area, Reed took steps to secure land for himself in Santa Clara, where he would eventually bring his family.

In early February 1847, the citizens and naval officers of San Francisco funded a rescue effort for the stranded Donner Party. Its leader was Selim E. Woodworth, a naval officer, with Reed as his second-in-command. Reed rounded up men and supplies in the Sonoma and Napa Valleys north of San Francisco Bay and headed into the mountains. Reed met his wife, Margret; his stepdaughter, Virginia; and son, James, Jr. coming out of the mountains. After an emotional reunion, Reed and his men continued on to the camp, where his remaining children, Martha (8) and Thomas (3), were still stranded. Reed led a party out but a severe blizzard trapped them at the top of Donner Pass for two days, during which time they ran out of food. By the time the storm had passed, most were too weak to continue. Reed departed with his children but had to leave the others behind. A few days later, however, another party rescued them.

== Later life ==
Reunited, the Reed family recuperated in the Napa Valley for many weeks, where Reed served briefly as sheriff of Sonoma. In 1847, Reed took his family to revive the neglected orchards of Mission San José. He leased the orchards and in that summer gathered and dried apples, figs, pears, and quince, which he shipped to Hawaii, trading for cocoa, coffee, rice, and sugar.

Less than a year from their escape from the snow, the Reeds welcomed another son, Charles Cadden Reed. Willianoski Yount, called Willie, followed in 1850, but failed to survive his childhood.

In the spring of 1848, Reed joined the California Gold Rush, finding rich diggings in the Placerville area. Returning to San Jose in the fall of that year, he began an active community life. The family settled on a 500-acre (200-hectare) ranch between First Street and Coyote Creek in what is now Downtown San Jose. In 1849, Reed became the chief of police of the San Jose Police Department.

Reed also became a real estate developer and speculated in mining enterprises. The subdivision of the Reed land in 1849 resulted in the naming of Reed, Carrie, Margaret [sic], Keyes, Lewis, Martha, Patterson, and Virginia Streets in honor of Reed family members. The present-day Reed Elementary School is named after Frazier O. Reed, a grandson of James F. Reed. In 1851, during the California statehood process, Reed was a leading proponent of a plan to make San Jose the capital of California, and he donated four city blocks to the cause. A portion of these donated lands became a public park, named Washington Square, which would in 1871, become the campus for the California State Normal School (now San Jose State University).

In 1856, gold was discovered in the nearby Santa Cruz Mountains, and Reed again set out to do some prospecting. Taking two of his sons, Reed leased a mining claim from Rancho Zayante owner Isaac Graham, on a tributary creek of the San Lorenzo River. The area never produced much gold, but the area near present-day Felton nevertheless became known as "Gold Gulch".

== Death ==
A widower since 1861, James F. Reed died in San Jose on July 24, 1874, at age 73. His great grandson later established Reeds Sporting Goods Store, a long-term business in San Jose, which became Reed's Indoor Range and is still open today under new management.

== Legacy ==
In 1948, San Jose State University's literary journal, then called El Portal, renamed itself to The Reed Magazine in honor of James F. Reed.

== In popular culture ==
American Murder Song's ballad "The Cry Of The Banished Horseman" is a musical account of James Reed's murder of John Snyder and subsequent banishment from The Donner Party.

Chris Cooper plays James Reed and Meredith Baxter plays Margret in the 1994 TV movie One More Mountain.

Actor John Anderson was cast as Reed in the 1960 episode, "A Girl Called Virginia", on the syndicated television anthology series, Death Valley Days. Patty McCormack played Virginia Reed, his stepdaughter who proves helpful beyond her years as the Donner Party splits apart.
