= McGlashan =

McGlashan is a surname. Notable people with the surname include:

- Alan McGlashan, MC (1898–1997), British pilot and doctor
- Alastair Robin McGlashan (died 2012), Anglican priest, a Jungian analyst, Tamil scholar
- Alexander McGlashan (c. 1740 – 1797), Scottish violinist
- Charles McGlashan, former member of Marin County Board of Supervisors, California
- Charles Fayette McGlashan (1847–1931), American lawyer, writer, sinophobe, entomologist
- Colin McGlashan (born 1964), former Scottish football striker
- Don McGlashan (born 1959), New Zealand musician and songwriter
- Edward McGlashan (1817–1889), Member of Parliament in Dunedin, Otago, New Zealand
- Hamish McGlashan (born 1963), Australian rower
- Jermaine McGlashan (born 1988), English footballer
- John McGlashan (footballer) (1967–2018), Scottish football player and manager
- John McGlashan (politician) (1802–1864), New Zealand lawyer, politician, public servant and educationalist
- Peter McGlashan (born 1979), cricketer who has represented New Zealand
- Peter A.S. McGlashan (1831–1908), Confederate officer during the American Civil War
- Rosco McGlashan (Born 1950), Australian drag racing record-holder, holder of the Australian land speed record
- Sara McGlashan (born 1982), New Zealand cricketer
- Stewart McGlashan (1807–1873) sculptor
- Thomas McGlashan (born 1942), American professor of psychiatry at Yale University
- Ximena McGlashan (1893–1986), American entomologist

== See also ==
- John McGlashan College, in the suburb of Maori Hill in Dunedin, New Zealand
- McGlashan Air Machine Gun, training weapon capable of firing BBs
- McGlashan Coin Shooting Pistol, introduced in 1945 by the McGlashan Air Machine Gun Company, Los Angeles, California
- McGlashan Everist, Australian architectural partnership
