= J. Michael Diack =

Scottish music publisher and composer; 1869–1946

J. Michael Diack (John Michael Diack, June 26, 1869, Glasgow–February 2, 1946, London) was a Scottish musician, superintending the teaching of music in the Glasgow area. His activities were varied: he founded the Glasgow Bach Choir in 1906; he made English translations of choral works by Bach and Handel; he was instrumental in founding the Royal Scottish Country Dance Society and publishing their music; and, in his own compositions, he arranged nursery rhymes in the style of Handel.

== Choral music ==
In 1906 he founded the Glasgow Bach Choir: since the original Bach Choir in London was established in 1875 with the aim of performing Bach's B minor mass in its entirety, the popularity of Bach's music resulted in similar choirs being formed over the country. Diack also made several English translations of choral works of Bach and Handel for Breitkopf & Härtel, one of the main musical publishing houses.

== Scottish country dance ==
In 1923 he became one of the founding members of the Scottish Country Dance Society when he suggested a meeting with Jean Milligan and Ysobel Stewart, who, as principal organisers, rapidly built up the society. In 1951. under George VI and the future queen, it became the Royal Scottish Country Dance Society. Diack arranged settings of numerous dances for the publishing company Paterson Sons & Co of Wigmore Street, London, and Buchanan Street, Glasgow.

== Nursery rhymes ==
As an individual musician, apart from his ballads, his idiosyncratic arrangements included "Sing a Song of Sixpence," "Mary Had a Little Lamb," "Mary, Mary, Quite Contrary," "Little Boy Blue," "Old Mother Hubbard" and "Little Jack Horner", set in the style of George Frederick Handel.

== Teaching and song books ==
For music students he wrote several pedagogical books: "Vocal Exercises on Tone-Placing and Enunciation" (1920)' "Five Minute Daily Exercises on Vocal Techniques" (1920); and "Tone Colour and Interpretation" (1926). He edited the "New Scottish Orpheus", containing 200 songs, and "The Burns Songbook", containing 50 songs. Diack became a Professor of singing at the "Athenaeum School of Music" in Glasgow. That institution changed its name first to the "Scottish National Academy of Music," then to the "Royal Scottish Academy of Music" and finally to the "Royal Conservatoire of Scotland".

== Bibliography ==
- Baker, Theodore (1958), "J. Michael Diack", Biographical Dictionary of Musicians, G. Schirmer
- "History". Royal Scottish Country Dance Society. 2020.
- Hore, Gearge (2015). "Paterson's Publications Ltd, A History of the Company". Alt Pibroch Club. Archived from the original on 20 February 2020.
