= Muriel Johnstone =

Scottish pianist and composer

Muriel Johnstone (born 1 June 1947, in West Hartlepool, England to Scottish parents) is a Scottish pianist and composer. She was raised and schooled in Ardrossan, Ayrshire, Scotland.

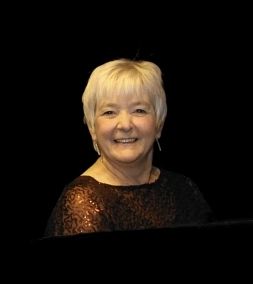
Muriel Johnstone, pianist, in concert with fiddler Keith Smith.

Johnstone operates the Scotscores label. She has performed and taught in many countries: UK, USA, Canada, New Zealand, Australia, Japan, France, Germany, The Netherlands, Belgium, Italy, Spain, Portugal, Switzerland, Austria, Czech Republic, Hungary, Russia, Romania, Norway, Sweden, Denmark and Finland. Qualified in the study of classical music (BMus and LRAM) and adept in various Scottish idioms, she has become sought after as a performer, accompanist (especially for dance) and teacher, bringing into prominence the role of piano in traditional music. Johnstone lives in Perthshire, Scotland with her husband Bill Zobel.

== Early life ==
Johnstone started learning to play the piano at the age of seven and the violin at the age of eight. She attended Ardrossan Academy in Ayrshire where she was Dux of music in 1965 and started composing while at school.

Johnstone's earliest composition is published in book Three Score and Four. She studied at the University of Edinburgh and graduated BMus in 1968. She then completed a year's teacher training at Moray House College of Education, Edinburgh.

== Career ==
Throughout her life, Johnstone has been involved in Scottish traditional music in particular playing for dancing. She was invited to play at the annual Summer school of the Royal Scottish Country Dance Society (RSCDS) starting in 1975 and was the youngest ever accompanist at that stage. For a number of years Johnstone was Director of Music with the RSCDS; and arranger of music for over 20 of their publications.

She is still involved in RSCDS and in 2002, for her outstanding contribution to this society, she was awarded their highest merit, the Scroll of Honour.

In 1998, Johnstone was invited to accompany a demonstration of Scottish Country dancing at the RSCDS 75th Anniversary reception in the presence of Her Majesty the Queen as Patron of the RSCDS.

Johnstone has traveled extensively worldwide both teaching, playing, recording and broadcasting in the field of Scottish traditional music and has also been interviewed on her expertise in this area.

== Compositions ==
Johnstone has composed over 800 pieces of music in the Scottish genre many of which are for dancing. Many of her pieces are commissioned to celebrate events, festivals and to complement newly devised dances. Her Scottish dance music includes reels, jigs, strathspeys, pastoral airs and waltzes while her additional repertoire encompasses other forms of music inspired variously by landscape, nature or the written word. She is currently working on music to accompany a Scottish historical documentary.

In 2004, Johnstone composed and arranged music for The Scotia Suite of Scottish Country Dances devised by Roy Goldring. This commission from The Royal Scottish Geographical Society was to honour the achievements of William Speirs Bruce commemorating the voyage of the Scotia, the research vessel of the Scottish National Antarctic Expedition 1902–1904. Some of Johnstone's pieces were later performed on two separate occasions at the Smithsonian Institution, Washington DC.

== Discography ==
Unless stated otherwise, released under Scotscores label.

- The Legendary Angus Fitchet, with Angus Fitchet’s Scottish Band – released 1983 (Lochshore release)
- Music for Twelve dances from RSCDS Book 3, with Bobby Crowe’s Scottish Country Dance Band – released 1984 (RSCDS release)
- North of the Tweed, with Muriel Johnstone’s Scottish Country Dance Band – released 1995
- Sandy ower the Sea, with Chris Duncan (fiddle) – released 1996 (Chris Duncan Music release)
- A Skye Collection, Solo album – released 1997
- Dance Through the Miscellanies Vol 1, with Muriel Johnstone’s Scottish Country Dance Band – released 2004, (RSCDS release)
- Dance Through the Miscellanies Vol 2, with Muriel Johnstone’s Scottish Country Dance Band – released 2004, (RSCDS release)
- Dance Through the Miscellanies Vol 3, with Muriel Johnstone’s Scottish Country Dance Band – released 2004, (RSDCS release)
- Dances by Mary Isdale MacNab Vol 1, The Muriel Johnstone Ensemble – released 2004, (RSCDS release)
- Dances by Mary Isdale MacNab Vol 2, The Muriel Johnstone Ensemble – released 2004, (RSCDS release)
- Haste Ye Back, with Muriel Johnstone’s Scottish Country Dance Band – released 1998
- Dancing Live, with Muriel Johnstone’s Scottish Country Dance Band – released 1998
- Cairngorm, with Keith Smith (fiddle) – released 1998
- Music for Twelve dances from RSCDS Book 24, with Muriel Johnstone’s Scottish Country Dance Band – released 1998 (RSCDS release)
- Memories of Fife, with Muriel Johnstone’s Scottish Country Dance Band – released 2000 (Scotia Imports release)
- 15 Social Dances, with Muriel Johnstone’s Scottish Country Dance Band – released 2000
- Ready...And!, with Bobby Brown and guests – released 2000 (RSCDS release)
- Dance to the Pipes – Piper's choice, with Bill Clement (Pipes) and Muriel Johnstone’s Scottish Country Dance Band – released 2000 (Bill Clement release)
- Dances with a Difference, with Muriel Johnstone’s Scottish Country Dance Band – released 2001 (Scotia Imports release)
- Dancing Fingers 1, Solo album – released 2001
- Dancing Fingers 2, Solo album – released 2001
- Dancing Fingers 3, Solo album – released 2001
- Dancing Fingers 4, Solo album – released 2002
- Dancing Fingers 5, Solo album – released 2002
- Music for the Scotia Centenary – released 2002 (RSCDS release)
- It’s About Time, with Calum MacKinnon (fiddle) – released 2003 (Skerryvore Records release)
- Delaware Valley, with Keith Smith (fiddle) – released 2004
- Vintage Goldring, with Keith Smith (fiddle) – released 2004
- Campbell’s Birl, with Muriel Johnstone’s Scottish Country Dance Band – released 2004
- Legacy of the Scottish Fiddle, Vol 2, with Alasdair Fraser (Fiddle) and Natalie Haas (Cello) – released 2004 (Culburnie Records release)
- Music for Twelve dances from RSCDS Book 38, with Muriel Johnstone’s Scottish Country Dance Band – released 2004 (RSCDS release)
- Masters of the Tradition Vol 1, Solo album – released 2005
- Aye Afloat, with Keith Smith (fiddle) – released 2007
- Ladies Step Dances, Solo album – released 2007 (RSCDS Newcastle Branch release)
- Silver Tassie, with Keith Smith (fiddle) – released 2008
- Todlen Hame, with Keith Smith (fiddle) – released 2008
- Highland Shortbread, with Keith Smith (fiddle) – released 2009
- Reel On, with Jim Lindsay (accordion) – released 2009
- Delta Delights, Solo album – released 2009
- Facets, Solo album – released 2010
- The St Andrews Collection of Step Dances, with Keith Smith (fiddle) – released 2010 (RSCDS release)
- 6 x Through The Dance, Solo album – released 2011
- Dancing on Air, Solo album – released 2011
- Just As It Was, Vol 1, with Alasdair Fraser (fiddle) – released 2012
- Just As It Was, Vol 2, with Alasdair Fraser (fiddle) – released 2012
- Just As It Was, Vol 3, with Alasdair Fraser (fiddle) – released 2012
- Moments in Time, with Keith Smith (fiddle) – released 2013
- Live from Birnam, concert with Jim Lindsay (accordion), Ian Robertson (fiddle), Pete Clark (fiddle) – released 2016
- Full Circle, with Ian Robertson (fiddle) – released 2018
- Music for Step Dances, with Keith Smith (fiddle) – released 199?
- Niel Gow’s Fiddle, with Pete Clark (fiddle) – released 2018
- Masters of the Tradition Vol 2, Solo album – released 2018
