= Boxwood Festival & Workshop =

Boxwood Festivals and Workshops
- Genre: Various Traditional Genre
- Dates: Varies
- Locations: Lunenburg, Nova Scotia, Canada. Waipu, New Zealand. Williamsburg, Virginia, USA
- Years active: 1996–present
- Founders: Chris Norman and Rod Garnett
- Website: http://www.boxwood.org

The Boxwood Festivals and Workshops are a series of music and dance festivals and workshops produced by Boxwood Festivals, Ltd., which "aims to provide opportunities for the dissemination, sharing, presentation and celebration of traditional music." There are three multi-day festivals scheduled annually, and other one-off workshops throughout the world. During these three festivals participants are joined by the local community for music, concerts, dances, classes, and informal music sessions. The music workshops are open to players of any instrument and skill level. The three annual events include classes led by Boxwood's Director, wooden flute player Chris Norman, for which he was awarded a Queen Elizabeth II Diamond Jubilee Medal, and Cape Breton fiddle and Baroque violinist David Greenberg. Other artists are invited to lead classes at the Boxwood Canada and Boxwood Williamsburg festivals.

Founded in 1996 by Chris Norman and University of Wyoming professor Rod Garnett, the first festival took place at the University of Wyoming. Originally a music camp for flute players and enthusiasts, the event has grown to be multiple festivals involving players, makers, and enthusiasts of other instrument and art forms, including voice and dance.

== Boxwood Canada ==
With more than 80 participants from around the world, The Boxwood Canada festival is the largest of the Boxwood Festival and Workshop events and takes place in Lunenburg, Nova Scotia, Canada. This was the initial event in the lineup with the first festival taking place at the University of Wyoming in 1996. The event moved from Wyoming, USA to Lunenburg, Nova Scotia, Canada in 1998 and has run every year since.

During the week long festival there are workshops on various styles of music, song, and dance based on the artists present for that year. The Boxwood Canada event includes daytime sessions for children (ages 5–12) and teens as well as the adult program. The week is followed by the "Best of Boxwood" Musique Royale tour showcasing some of the artists who lead the masterclass style workshops.

Evening concerts and dances are also presented. These are ticketed events for any local residences or visitors who have not registered for the daily workshops and free to all registered for the entire week.

Music sessions occur nightly during the week, often in local establishments. These offer nonparticipants another opportunity to experience the music of the festival.

== Boxwood New Zealand ==
Boxwood New Zealand, which began in 2004, is held in Waipu, New Zealand is one week during the end of September/beginning of October. It also provides "classes, performances, sessions and social dancing."

== Boxwood Williamsburg ==
Boxwood Williamsburg occurs in Historic Williamsburg, Virginia. It has been held in March and April and is now settling into the second weekend after Easter. Group workshops, private lessons, and traditional music sessions are provided to participants. An evening performance is also offered which is free to participants and also available as a single ticket item to anyone wishing to attend.

== Boxwood New Australia ==
Boxwood Australia was first held in Queenscliff, Victoria on 20–22 November 2015
