= Magdalene Stirling =

Scottish composer (1765–1846)

Magdalene Stirling (1765–1846) was a Scottish composer best known for Twelve Tunes Composed by Miss Stirling of Ardoch, which she had printed privately in 1796.

Stirling was the youngest of five daughters born in Ardoch, Perthshire, to Christian Erskine and Sir William Stirling, the 4th Baronet of Ardoch. She was friendly with Niel and Nathaniel Gow, who published some of her compositions. Gow sometimes published Stirling’s works without attribution, or “as composed by Miss Stirling of Ardoch.”

Stirling’s fiddle and instrumental tunes include:

- Ardoch House
- Boyne Hunt (also known as Molly Maguire or Perthshire Hunt)
- Colonel Noel’s Fancy
- Countess of Sutherland’s Strathspey
- Dear Lamb
- Dunira Lodge
- Earl of Elgen’s Strathspey
- Honorable Charles Bruce’s Reel
- Lord Torphichen’s Strathspey (also known as Lord Torphichen’s Favorite)
- Mr. Stirling of Keir’s Reel
- Perthshire Volunteers
- Sir William Stirling’s Strathspey
- Twelve Tunes Composed by Miss Stirling of Ardoch
- Wager
- View compositions by Magdalene Stirling
