= Daniel Jubb =

British rocket scientist

Daniel Jubb (born 1984 in Manchester, England) is a British rocket scientist. In a 17 November 2008 article from the British newspaper The Times, he was named "one of the world's leading rocket scientists" by the Royal Air Force Wing Commander Andy Green.

== Biography ==
Having been interested in rockets since childhood, Jubb obtained corporate financing and flew many amateur rockets, all by the time he was 14 years old.

In 1995, along with his grandfather Sid Guy, he co-founded The Falcon Project, a company that designs and develops rocket engines for commercial and military applications. At that time, Jubb obtained permission from the UK Ministry of Defence to launch rockets from the missile test platform of the Otterburn Army Training Estate in Northumberland. After reaching the maximum allowable launch height of 20,000 feet, he moved the operations of The Falcon Project to a location near Garlock in the Mojave Desert in California. Jubb runs The Falcon Project from a home office in his parents' house, and the company supplies the MOD, United States military, and plans to build satellite launch vehicles. In a 1998 documentary for Channel 4 titled Raw Talent: The Rocket Scientist, Jubb mentioned building his first rocket at age five "from a McDonald's straw, a light-bulb holder, and some household ingredients".

Although media claims have been made about the altitudes reached by Jubb's rockets, none have appeared on the list of altitude records held by the United Kingdom Rocketry Association.

In November 2005, Jubb joined the Bloodhound SSC project. The Bloodhound is a jet and rocket powered car designed to break the land speed record by traveling at approximately 1,000 miles per hour (1,609 km/h). Jubb and The Falcon Project designed, built, and repeatedly tested their hybrid rocket engine that will produce an estimated 25,000 lbs of thrust, suitable for either Bloodhound SSC or Virgin Galactic's SpaceShip Two. Additionally, The Falcon Project Ltd completed and tested a full-scale monopropellant thruster for subsonic testing of the vehicle. On 28 November 2010, Neil Armstrong visited the Bloodhound SSC headquarters and chatted with the team, including Jubb. This 3 October 2012 report was televised on the Bloodhound SSC hybrid rocket fabricated by The Falcon Project Ltd with Daniel Jubb as director, which was successfully tested in public at Newquay, GB. Due to escalating costs caused by control system delays, the hybrid rocket for Bloodhound will instead be developed by Nammo.

On 10 June 2015, Jubb visited Stokesley School and spoke with Year 10 students extensively about Rocket Science and assisted them in fitting their own rockets with motors, which was a great success.

Jubb has also been noted for his prominent mustache, earning him recognition from The Chap magazine.

== See also ==
- United Kingdom Aerospace Youth Rocketry Challenge
- Roy Dommett
