= Chris Norman (flautist) =

Canadian musician

- Born: 1963 (age 61–62); Halifax, Nova Scotia, Canada
- Genres: Celtic, folk, bluegrass, classical
- Occupation: Musician
- Instrument(s): Wooden Flute, Scottish Small Pipes
- Website: www.chrisnorman.com

Chris Norman (born in Halifax, Nova Scotia) is a Canadian flautist. He also plays Scottish smallpipes, piano and bodhran, and composes music.

== Career ==
Specializing in the wooden flute, Norman has played as a member of groups such as the Baltimore Consort, Helicon, Skyedance, and Concerto Caledonia; and performed and recorded solo. His musical style is eclectic, with projects including "Celtic Canadian and American traditional music; Renaissance tunes; orchestral, chamber, and solo performance; rock/jazz crossover; classical crossover" and world music. He plays "traditional Celtic, Appalachian and Cape Breton music... and he played the flute for the Ceilidh scene in the movie Titanic".

Norman is also the director of Boxwood Festival & Workshop, a 501(c)(3) organization in the United States which aims to provide opportunities for the dissemination, sharing, presentation and celebration of traditional music. Norman and Boxwood have presented workshops in Canada, the United States, Europe and Asia.
