= Bloodhound LSR =

In-development land speed record car

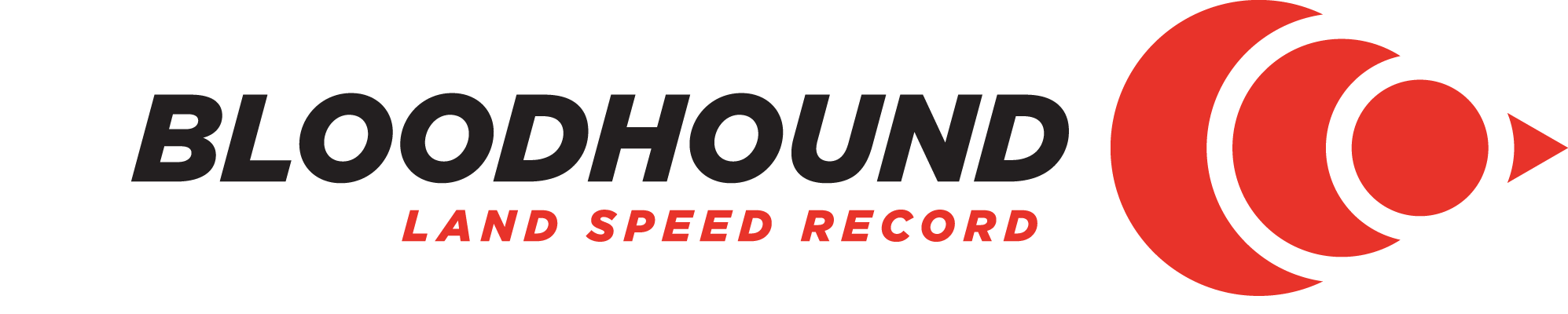

Overview
- Manufacturer: Grafton LSR, Bristol
- Assembly: UK Land Speed Record Centre, Berkeley, Gloucestershire, England

Body and chassis
- Class: Land speed record vehicle

Powertrain
- Engine: Rolls-Royce Eurojet EJ200 afterburning turbofan

Dimensions
- Wheelbase: 8.9 m (29 ft)
- Length: 12.9 m (42 ft)
- Width: 2.5 m (8.2 ft)
- Height: 3.0 m (9.8 ft)
- Kerb weight: 6,422 kg (14,158 lb) fuelled

Chronology
- Predecessor: ThrustSSC

Bloodhound LSR, formerly Bloodhound SSC, is a British land vehicle designed to travel at supersonic speeds with the intention of setting a new world land speed record. The arrow-shaped car, under development since 2008, is powered by a jet engine and could be fitted with an additional rocket engine. The initial goal is to exceed the current speed record of 763 mph (1,228 km/h), with the vehicle believed to be able to achieve up to 1,000 miles per hour (1,609 km/h).

The previous business behind Project Bloodhound went into administration (bankruptcy) in late 2018. Entrepreneur Ian Warhurst bought the car to keep the project alive. A new company, Grafton LSR Limited, was formed to manage the project, which was renamed Bloodhound LSR and moved to SGS Berkeley Green University Technical College. Lack of funds and the COVID-19 pandemic stalled progress in 2020, and in 2021 the vehicle was offered for sale. In May 2021, the project was taken over by Stuart Edmondson, who became the CEO of Grafton LSR Ltd. In November 2023, Andy Green stepped down from the driver position for the project. In January 2025, project ambassadors stated that, while the project is still alive, they are still searching for a new driver.

The venue for high speed testing and future world land speed record attempts is the Hakskeen Pan in the Mier area of the Northern Cape, South Africa. An area 12 miles (19 km) long and 3 miles (4.8 km) wide was identified as suitable, with the first runs in October 2019. Further runs in November 2019 achieved a top speed of 628 miles per hour (1,011 km/h), making the vehicle the eighth to attain a land speed of over 600 miles per hour (970 km/h).

== Timeline ==
=== Inception ===
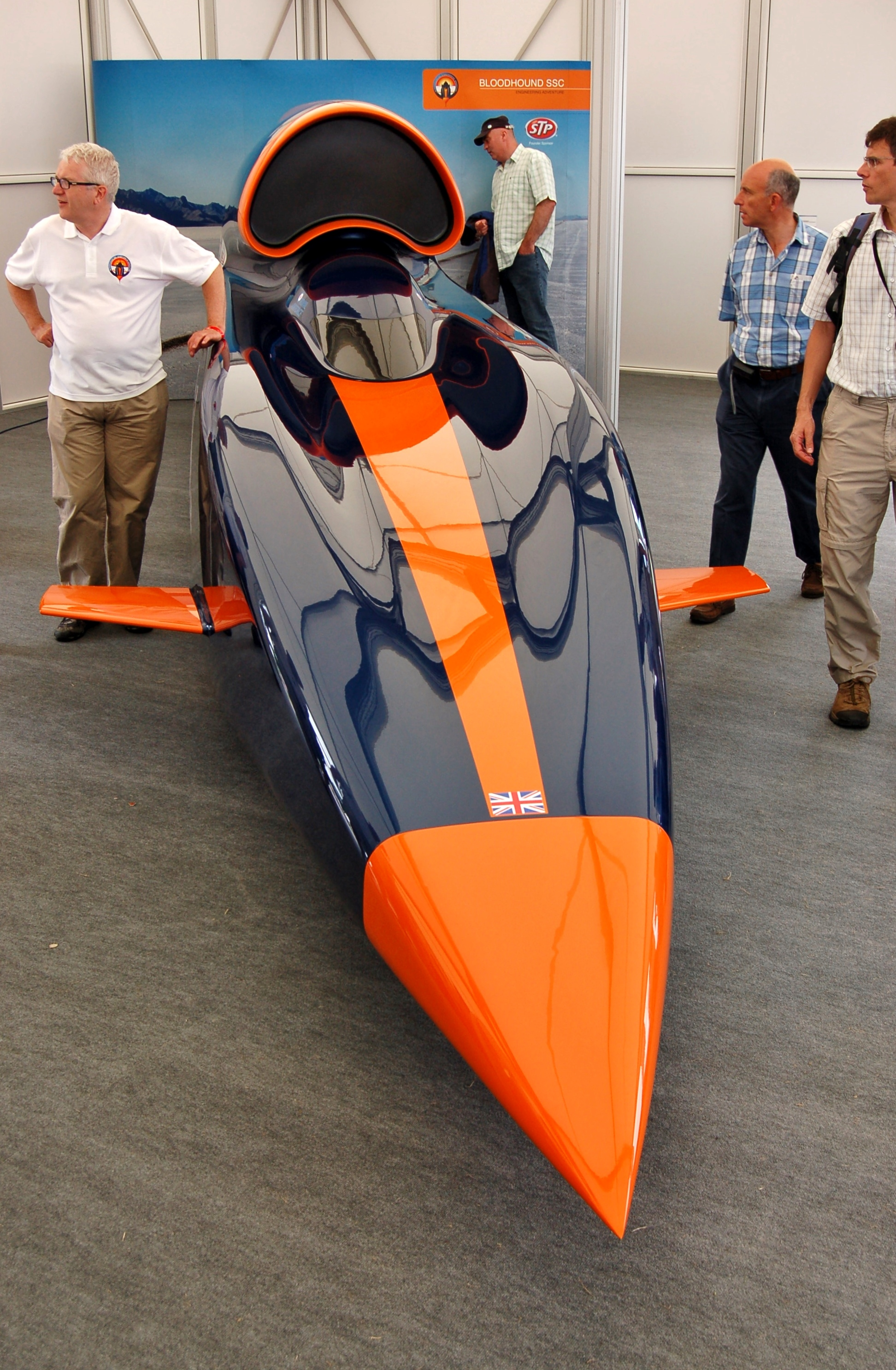
The Bloodhound SSC show car (in original livery) makes its debut at the Goodwood Festival of Speed 2009

The Bloodhound project was announced on 23 October 2008 at the London Science Museum by Lord Drayson – then Minister of Science in the UK's Department for Innovation, Universities and Skills – who first suggested the project in 2006 to land speed record holders Richard Noble and Andy Green, a pilot and Wing Commander serving in the RAF. The two men, between them, have held the land speed record since 1983.

In 1983, Noble, a self-described engineer and adventurer reached 633 mph (1,019 km/h) driving a turbojet-powered car named Thrust2 across the Nevada desert. In 1997, he headed the project to build ThrustSSC, which was driven by Green at 763 mph (1,228 km/h), thereby breaking the sound barrier, a first for a land vehicle (in compliance with Fédération Internationale de l'Automobile rules). Green was originally set to be Bloodhound LSR's driver.

The Bloodhound project was named for the Bristol Bloodhound surface-to-air missile, a project that Bloodhound Chief Aerodynamicist Ron Ayers had previously worked on.

The project was at first based in the former Maritime Heritage Centre on the Bristol harbourside, next to Brunel's SS Great Britain. In 2013 the project relocated to a larger site in Avonmouth. The head offices of the project moved to Didcot, Oxfordshire in late 2015.

=== 2017 tests ===
Runway testing of up to 200 miles per hour (320 km/h) took place on 26, 28 and 30 October 2017 at Newquay Airport, Cornwall.

=== 2018 change of ownership ===
In May 2018, the team announced plans for high speed testing at 500–600 mph (800–970 km/h) in May 2019, and then a 1,000 mph (1,600 km/h) run in 2020. However, the company backing the project, Bloodhound Programme Ltd, went into administration (bankruptcy) in late 2018 leaving a funding gap of £25 million, which put the venture's future into question.

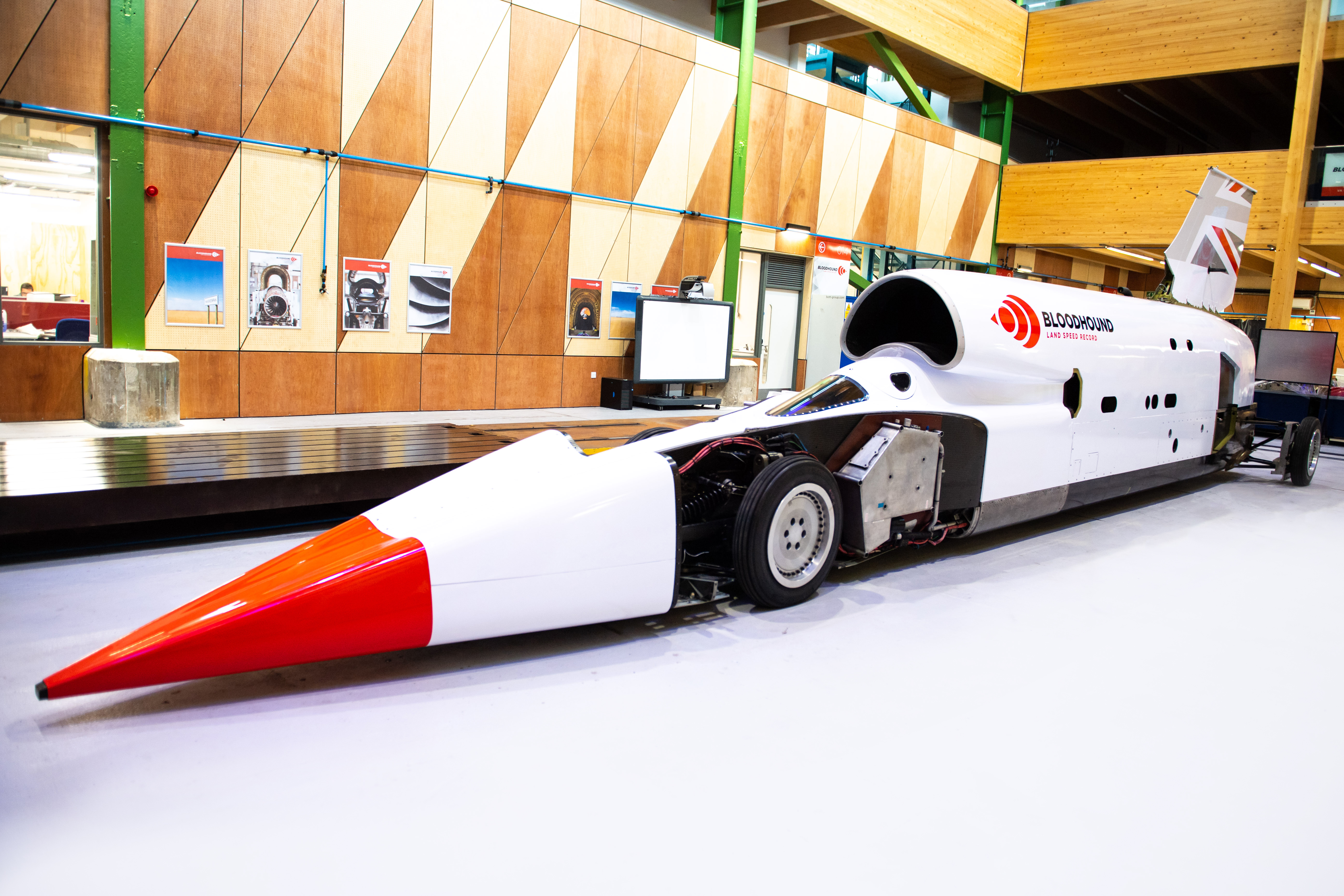
Bloodhound LSR (in new livery) at the launch event, SGS Berkeley Green UTC, 2019

The project was "axed" in December 2018, with plans to sell off the remaining assets. Later that month, Yorkshire entrepreneur Ian Warhurst stepped in to rescue the project by buying the assets and intellectual property, including the car, for an undisclosed sum.

=== 2019 tests ===
In March 2019, it was announced that Warhurst had formed a new company called Grafton LSR Ltd. to manage the project, which became the car's legal owner. The company said in a statement that Warhurst was trying to save the project with new sponsors and partners.

The name of the new team became 'Bloodhound LSR' (for Land Speed Record). The car and the project's headquarters moved to SGS Berkeley Green University Technical College in Berkeley, Gloucestershire near Gloucester. With the new ownership, the car's blue and orange livery was repainted into white and red, as a "blank slate" for new potential sponsors and the speed goal was reduced to over 800 miles per hour (1,300 km/h), the original 1,000 miles per hour (1,600 km/h) turned into a potential "second goal" if sufficient interest is achieved after the record.

High speed testing of the car took place at the Hakskeen Pan in October and November 2019. Test runs driven by Green began on 25 October, using only a Rolls-Royce Eurojet EJ200 engine, with an expectation of reaching 400–500 mph (640–800 km/h). The car achieved 501 mph (806 km/h) on 6 November 2019, and a final top speed of 628 mph (1,011 km/h) on 16 November, making it the eighth vehicle to attain a land speed of over 600 mph.

=== 2020–2022 ===
Lack of funds prevented the fitting of the Nammo rocket in 2020, and combined with the effects of the COVID-19 pandemic, this meant the opportunity to run the vehicle in 2021 was lost. In January 2021, Warhurst said the vehicle was up for sale and it was reported that the team had moved on to other projects. Warhurst stepped aside as CEO in August 2021 and Stuart Edmondson, the project's Engineering Operations Manager for the previous five years, took over the role. When interviewed in July 2022 Edmundson stated that, while on hold, the Bloodhound LSR project was "very much alive" and a new land speed record could be achieved very quickly if new investment could be secured. Edmundson also reported that the project had adopted a new environmental focus, with the aim of achieving a net zero carbon land speed record.

=== 2023 ===
On 8–14 November 2023, Edmondson led a roadshow to seek funding and a new driver for a potential record-setting campaign, estimated to cost between £8 million and £12 million. The vehicle resides at Coventry Transport Museum.

== Design ==
=== Car ===
The car was designed by Bloodhound's Chief Aerodynamicist Ron Ayers, Chief Engineer Mark Chapman. Stability modelling efforts saw graduate design engineer Jenna Gaff work with aerodynamicists from Swansea University to carry out a first-of-a-kind DOE (Design of experiments).

Bloodhound LSR is designed to accelerate from 0 to 800 mph (1,300 km/h) in 38 seconds and decelerate using airbrakes at around 800 mph, a parachute at a maximum deployment speed of around 650 mph (1,050 km/h) and disc brakes below 200 mph (320 km/h). The force on the driver during acceleration would be 2.5 g (two-and-a-half times their body weight) and up to 3 g during deceleration.

=== Aerodynamics ===
The Bloodhound will create a shockwave when it reaches the speed of sound.

The College of Engineering at Swansea University has been heavily involved in the aerodynamic shape of the vehicle from the start. Dr Ben Evans and his team used Computational Fluid Dynamics (CFD) technology designed by Professor Oubay Hassan and Professor Ken Morgan to provide an understanding of the aerodynamic characteristics of the proposed shape, at all speeds, including predicting the likely vertical, lateral and drag forces on the vehicle and its pitch and yaw stability. This technology, originally developed for the aerospace industry, was validated for a land-going vehicle during the design of ThrustSSC.

=== Propulsion ===
Three prototype Eurojet EJ200 jet engines developed for the Eurofighter and bound for a museum were loaned to the project. The car will use one EJ200 to provide around half the thrust and power the car to 650 mph (1,050 km/h). A custom monopropellant rocket designed by Nammo will be used to add extra thrust for the world land speed record runs. For the 1,000 mph (1,600 km/h) runs, the monopropellant rocket will be replaced with a hybrid rocket from Nammo. A third engine, a Jaguar supercharged V-8 is used as an auxiliary power unit to drive the oxidiser pump for the rocket, although this will be replaced by an electric motor.

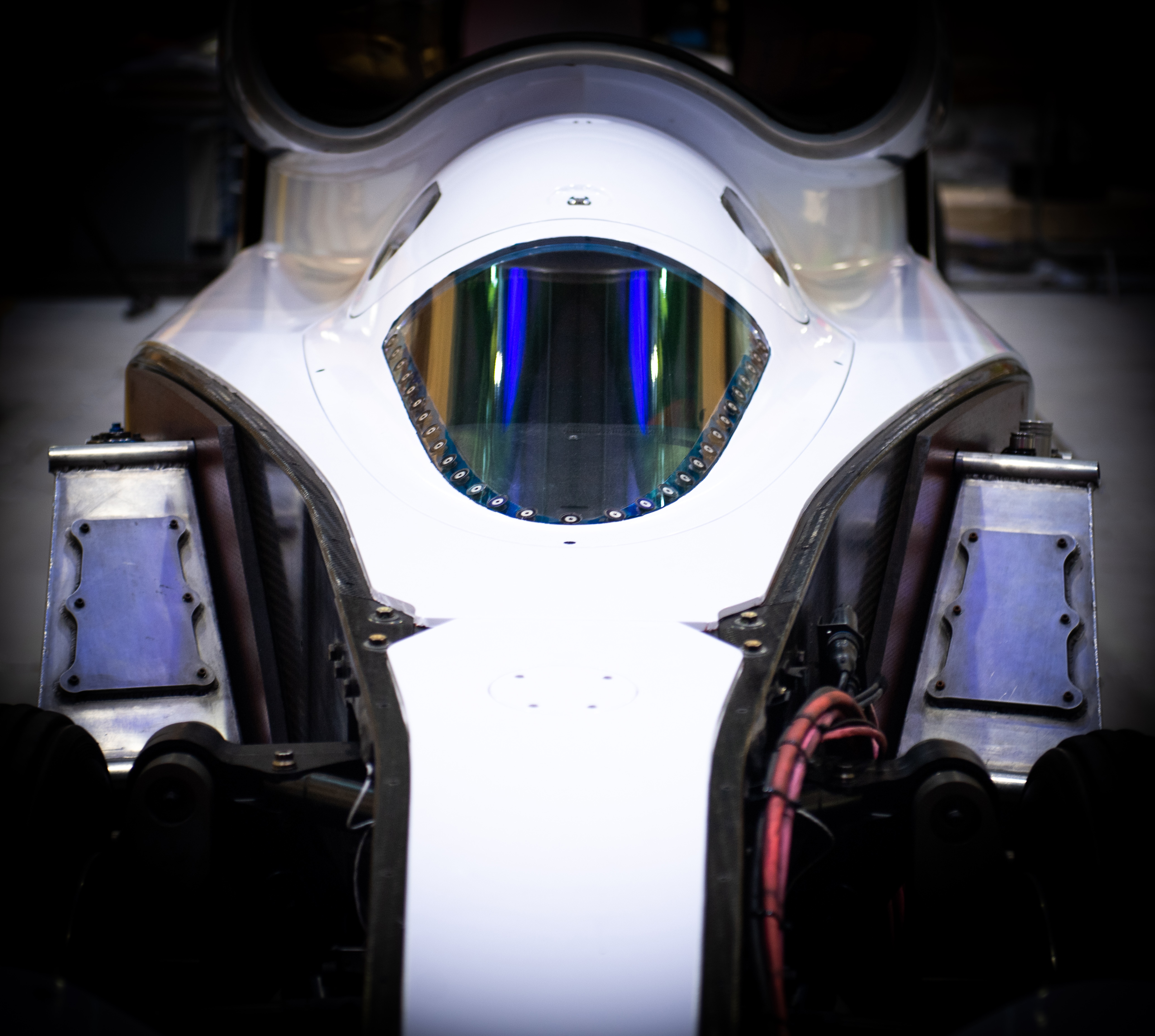
The cockpit exterior

Initially, Bloodhound SSC was going to use a custom hybrid rocket motor being designed by Daniel Jubb. The rocket was successfully tested at Newquay Airport in 2012. However, constraints on cost, time, and test facilities led to a decision to instead use a rocket designed by Norwegian company Nammo.

At first, the plan was that the car would use a Nammo hybrid rocket or cluster of rockets, to be fuelled by solid hydroxyl-terminated polybutadiene and liquid high-test peroxide oxidiser. This plan was revised in 2017 and the car will use a monopropellant rocket for the land speed record runs.

For the car to achieve 800 mph (1,300 km/h), the monopropellant rocket would need to produce around 40 kN (8,992 lbf) of thrust and the EJ200 jet engine 90 kN (20,232 lbf) in reheat.

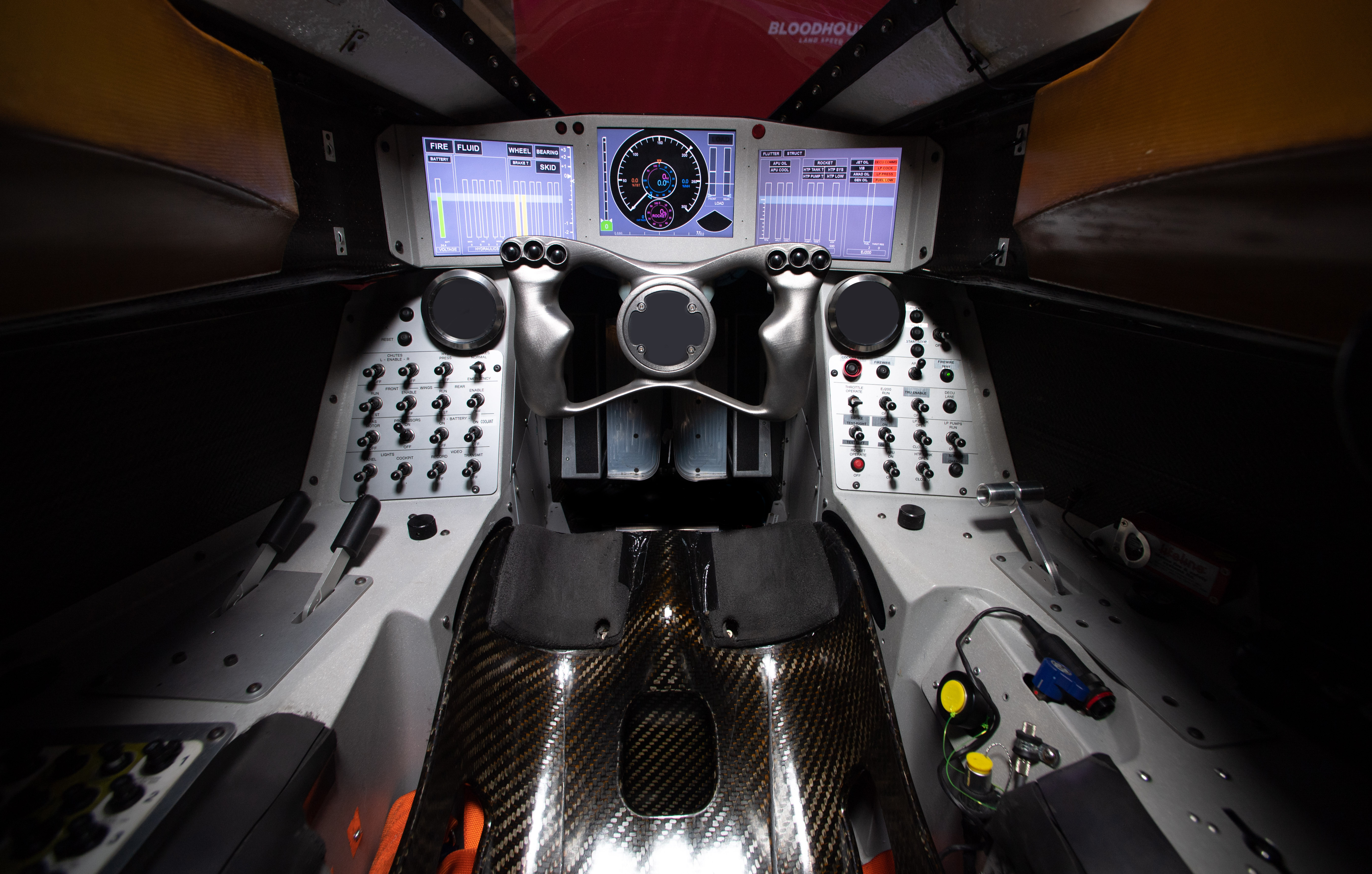
Cockpit interior

=== Wheels ===
For low-speed testing at Newquay Airport in 2017, the car was fitted with four runway wheels based on those of an English Electric Lightning fighter jet with refurbished original tyres. These were replaced for the high-speed test runs in the desert in South Africa in 2019 by four 90-centimetre (35 in) diameter wheels weighing 95 kg (209 lb), forged from an aircraft-grade aluminium zinc alloy. These were designed to spin at up to 10,200 rpm and resist centrifugal forces of up to 50000 g at the rim.

==== Wheel bearings ====
Three Timken high-speed (DN around 1,000,000 at full speed) tapered roller bearings support each wheel. When the car's mass increased to 7,500 kg (16,500 lb), Timken recalculated bearing life to be 50 hours, or a 5,000% safety factor given the less than one-hour run time.

== Construction ==
The car was built at sites in Bristol and Avonmouth. A full-scale model was unveiled at the 2010 Farnborough International Airshow, when it was announced that Hampson Industries would begin to build the rear chassis section of the car in the first quarter of 2011 and that a deal for the manufacture of the front of the car was due. The car was largely completed by October 2017 when full reheat static testing was undertaken with the jet engine at Newquay Airport followed by low speed test runs.

Further construction was carried out before the project went into administration and the car was then completed at Berkeley before high speed testing.

== Testing locations ==
Early in the project, Swansea University's School of the Environment and Society was enlisted to help determine a new test site for the record runs because the test site for the ThrustSSC record attempt had become unsuitable. The venue chosen for high speed testing and for the land speed record runs was Hakskeen Pan in the Mier area of the Northern Cape, South Africa, on a track measuring 12 miles (19 km) long. The local community cleared 16,500 tonnes of stones by hand from an area measuring 22 million square metres to create space for 20 tracks each 10 metres wide, as the car cannot run twice on the same strip of desert.

Low speed runway testing of over 200 mph (320 km/h) occurred on 26, 28 and 30 October 2017 at Newquay Airport.

High speed testing at Hakskeen Pan began in October 2019. The car achieved 628 mph (1,011 km/h) on its final run on 16 November 2019.

== Links to science education ==
A charitable company Bloodhound SSC Education Ltd was established in 2016 with the objective of promoting science at all levels of the education system. The name of the charity was altered to Bloodhound Education Ltd in 2019.

== See also ==
- Aussie Invader 5R
- List of vehicle speed records
- North American Eagle Project
