= McGlashan Coin Shooting Pistol =

MacGlashan Coin Shooting Pistol
- Type: Coin shooting pistol
- Place of origin: United States

Production history
- Designed: 1945
- Manufacturer: MacGlashan Air Machine Gun Company

Specifications
- Action: Spring charger
- Sights: Iron

The MacGlashan Coin Shooting Pistol was first introduced in 1945 by the MacGlashan Air Machine Gun Company that was located in Long Beach, California. MacGlashan was better known as the maker of the MacGlashan Air Machine Gun used by the military for training the Army Air Corp and US Navy personnel during World War II.

The Coin Shooting Pistol that fired American five cent pieces was designed for the Carnival trade and Amusement Parks. They were sold in sets of four with chains and eye bolts to attach to stall counters. When first introduced the operator was expected to set up prizes on boards/stands. Contestants were expected to knock the prize off to win. Tarpaulins behind the prizes would catch the booth operators earnings.

In 1946, MacGlashan was offering targets that were more difficult and had to have five "Aces" on the target board knocked down to win. Aces were able to be remotely reset by the operator. Pistols were not marked "MacGlashan". Markings on left side are "Made in U.S.A.", and right side has "Pat. Pend.".

MacGlashan designed the guns to look and feel like the FN Model 1903 Semi-automatic pistol. A large coil spring shoots the coin, while a second smaller spring located in the breech gives the impression of recoil from an automatic slide.
