= Skyedance =

Skyedance is a Celtic fusion group, founded by fiddler Alasdair Fraser in 1996.

== Discography ==
1. Way Out to Hope Street (1997)
2. Labyrinth (2000)
3. Live in Spain (2002)

== Band members ==
- Alasdair Fraser (fiddle, viola)
- Mick Linden (Fretless bass)
- Peter Maund (percussion)
- Eric Rigler (Scottish bagpipes, uilleann pipes)
- Paul Machlis (piano, keyboard)
- Chris Norman (wooden flute, piccolo)
