= Mitchell Downie =

Scottish footballer

Personal information
- Date of birth: 9 September 1923
- Place of birth: Troon, Scotland
- Date of death: 12 July 2001 (aged 77)
- Place of death: Bradford, England
- Position: Goalkeeper

Senior career*
Years	Team	Apps	(Gls)
1943–1946	Hibernian	0	(0)
1946–1947	Kilmarnock	28	(0)
1947–1950	Airdrie	81	(0)
1950–1954	Bradford Park Avenue	156	(0)
1954–1959	Lincoln City	157	(0)
1959	Goole Town		
1959–1963	Bradford City	134	(0)
1963–1964	Doncaster Rovers	7	(0)
1964	Altrincham	4	(0)
Total		567	(0)
- * Club domestic league appearances and goals

Mitchell Downie (9 September 1923 – 12 July 2001) was a Scottish professional footballer, who played as a goalkeeper. Active in both Scotland and England, Downie made over 500 appearances in Scottish and English league football.

== Career ==
Born in Troon, Downie began his career during World War II with Hibernian. His professional career began in 1946 with Kilmarnock, and he later played for Airdrie, Bradford Park Avenue, Lincoln City, Bradford City and Doncaster Rovers, making a total of 563 appearances in Scottish and English league football.

Downie also played non-league football with Goole Town and Altrincham.
