= Nathaniel Gow =

Scottish musician

Nathanial Gow
- Born: 28 May 1763; Dunkeld, Perthshire, Scotland
- Died: 19 January 1831 (aged 67); Edinburgh, Scotland
- Occupations: Musician; composer; co-founder of a music-selling and publishing house
- Instrument(s): Violin, fiddle, cello

Nathaniel Gow (28 May 1763 – 19 January 1831 ) was a Scottish musician who was the fourth son of Niel Gow, and a celebrated performer, composer and arranger of tunes, songs and other pieces on his own right. He wrote about 200 compositions including the popular "Caller Herrin'".

== Early life ==
Nathaniel was born to Niel Gow and Margaret Wiseman, at Inver, near Dunkeld, Perthshire, on 28 May 1763; with brothers William, John, and Andrew also showing early musical talent. He was taught the fiddle at first by his father, but was soon sent to Edinburgh where he was taught successively by Robert "Red Rob" Mackintosh, the fiddler Alexander McGlashan, and his elder brother William Gow. He also learnt the cello under Joseph Reinagle. In 1782 he was appointed as one of His Majesty's herald trumpeters for Scotland.

== Career ==
In 1796, Gow started a music-selling and publishing business with William Shepherd at 41 North Bridge, Edinburgh, which continued until Shepherd's death in 1813. Gow became prominent as the leader of many bands, and was important at many assemblies such as the Caledonian Hunt Balls. His patron was the Duke of Atholl.

Between 1799 and 1824, he published a significant number of collections of tunes, including some by Scottish composer Magdalene Stirling.

Gow played for King George IV at the Royal Caledonian Hunt ball during his visit to Scotland in 1822.

== Later life ==
He married twice, and had five daughters and one son by his first wife, Janet Fraser. Their daughter Margaret, in 1810, married Adam Armstrong, a pioneer of the Colony of Western Australia.

By his second wife, Mary Hog, whom he married in 1814, he had three sons and two daughters. Only one of his daughters, Augusta Gow (13 July 1815 – 23 February 1893), followed in the family profession, and became a teacher of music in Edinburgh. She married Frederick Alexander Packer and emigrated to Tasmania; their large family included Frederick Augustus Packer.

Gow died in Edinburgh on 19 January 1831, aged 67, and was buried in Greyfriars Kirkyard.

The 20th Century English composer David Gow is a descendant. He commemorated the connection in his Six Diversions on an Ancestral Theme.

== See also ==
- Scottish Baroque music
- Joseph Reinagle
