= Joseph Reinagle =

Music composer and cellist

Joseph Reinagle (1762 – 12 November 1825) was a music composer and popular cellist of the 18th century.

He was a contemporary of Joseph Haydn, with whom he performed as principal cello. He also wrote a guide to playing the cello.

== Biography ==
Joseph Reinagle, the son of a German musician resident in England, was born in Portsmouth in 1762. He was the brother of Alexander Reinagle. He was at first intended for the navy, but became apprentice to a jeweller in Edinburgh. Then, adopting music as a profession, he studied the French horn and trumpet with his father, and soon appeared in public as a player of those instruments. Acting on medical advice, he abandoned the wind instruments, and studied the violoncello under Schetky (who married his sister), and the violin under Aragoni.

He succeeded so well that he was appointed leader of the Edinburgh Theatre band. After appearing as a cellist in London, he went in 1784 to Dublin, where he remained for two years. Returning to London, he took a prominent position in the chief orchestras, and was principal cello at the Salomon concerts under Haydn, who showed him much kindness. Engaged to play at the Oxford concerts, he was so well received that he settled in the city and died there in November 1825, aged 62 or 63.

Reinagle was a very able violoncellist, and enjoyed a wide popularity. Nathaniel Gow was one of his Edinburgh pupils. He composed a good deal of music for violin, violoncello, and pianoforte, and wrote a Concise Introduction to the Art of playing the Violoncello (London, 1830), which went through four editions.

A son, Alexander Robert Reinagle, musician, born at Brighton on 11 August 1799, was from 1823 to 1853 organist of St. Peter's-in-the-East, Oxford, and died at Kidlington, Oxfordshire, where he was buried on 6 April 1877. He published Psalm Tunes for the Voice and Pianoforte (circa 1830), in which appears the tune 'St. Peter,' widely used, and included in most church collections of the late nineteenth century.
