= Alasdair Fraser =

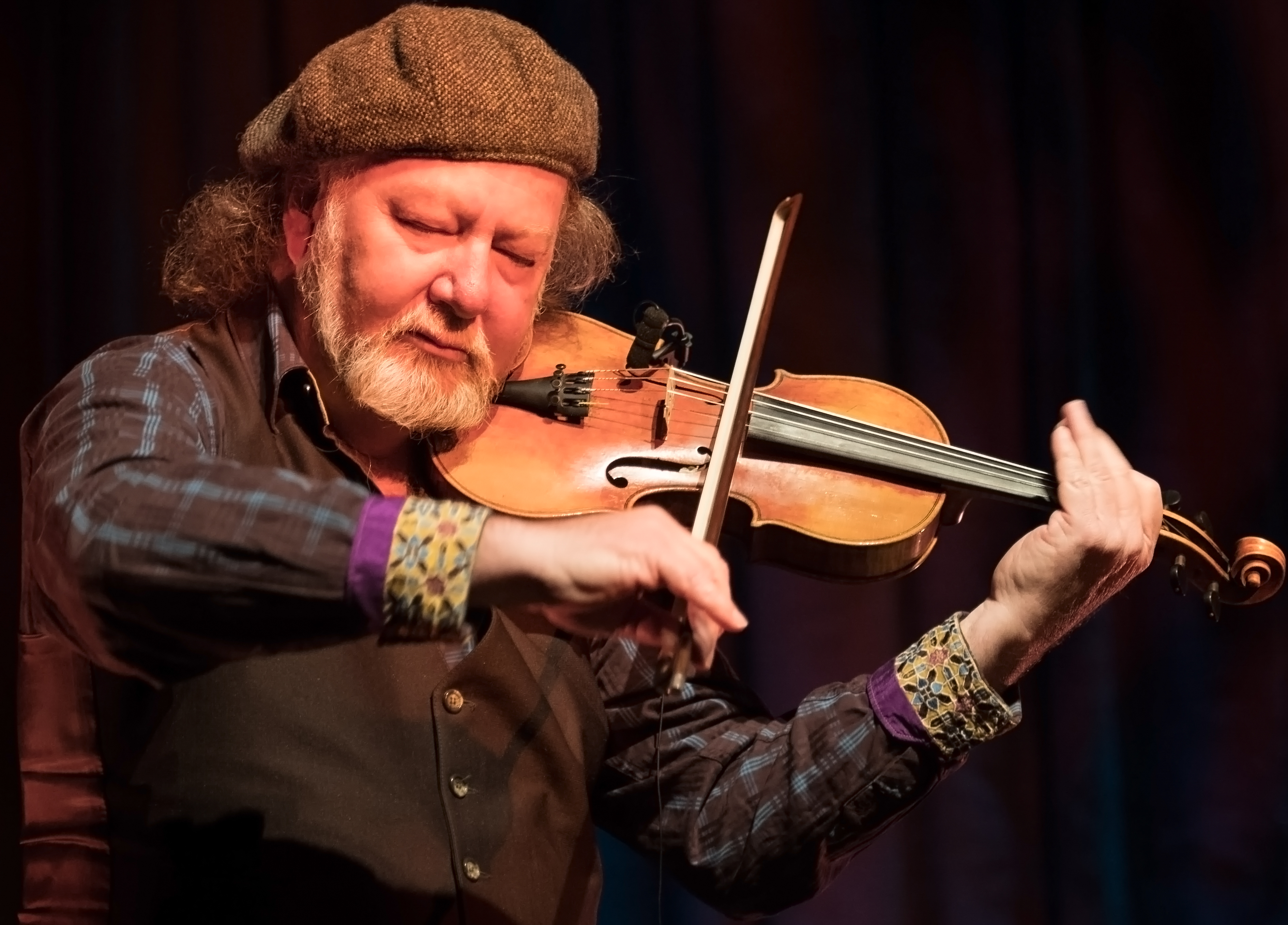
- Alasdair Fraser at the Celtic String Playhouse, 2017

Background information
- Born: 14 May 1955 (age 71)
- Origin: Clackmannan, Scotland
- Genre: Scottish fiddle
- Instrument: Fiddle
- Label: Culburnie
- Website: www.alasdairfraser.com

Alasdair Fraser (born 14 May 1955, Clackmannan, Scotland) is a Scottish fiddler, composer, performer, and recording artist.

Fraser operates Culburnie Records and is a leading artist on the label. He has founded various summer fiddling programs: the Valley of the Moon fiddle camp in California begun in 1984; Sierra Fiddle Camp in California begun in 2006; Crisol de Cuerda, a trad strings program in Spain begun in 2008; and Stringmania!, a trad strings program in Australia in 2016. Adept in various Scottish idioms, in recent years, with cellist Natalie Haas, he has helped reconstruct and revive the Scottish tradition of playing traditional music on violin and cello ("wee fiddle" and "big fiddle"). Fraser lives near Grass Valley, California with his wife and two sons.

He has won the Scottish National Fiddle Championship two times.

In December 2011, Fraser was inducted into the Scottish Traditional Music Hall of Fame.

In November 2023, the violin on which Fraser had performed for the previous forty years was stolen from a rental car in downtown Portland, Oregon, along with his favored bows, a cello, and music notations. The cello was found and returned the same day. The violin and bows were recovered by local music store David Kerr Violin Shop the following month and returned intact to Fraser.

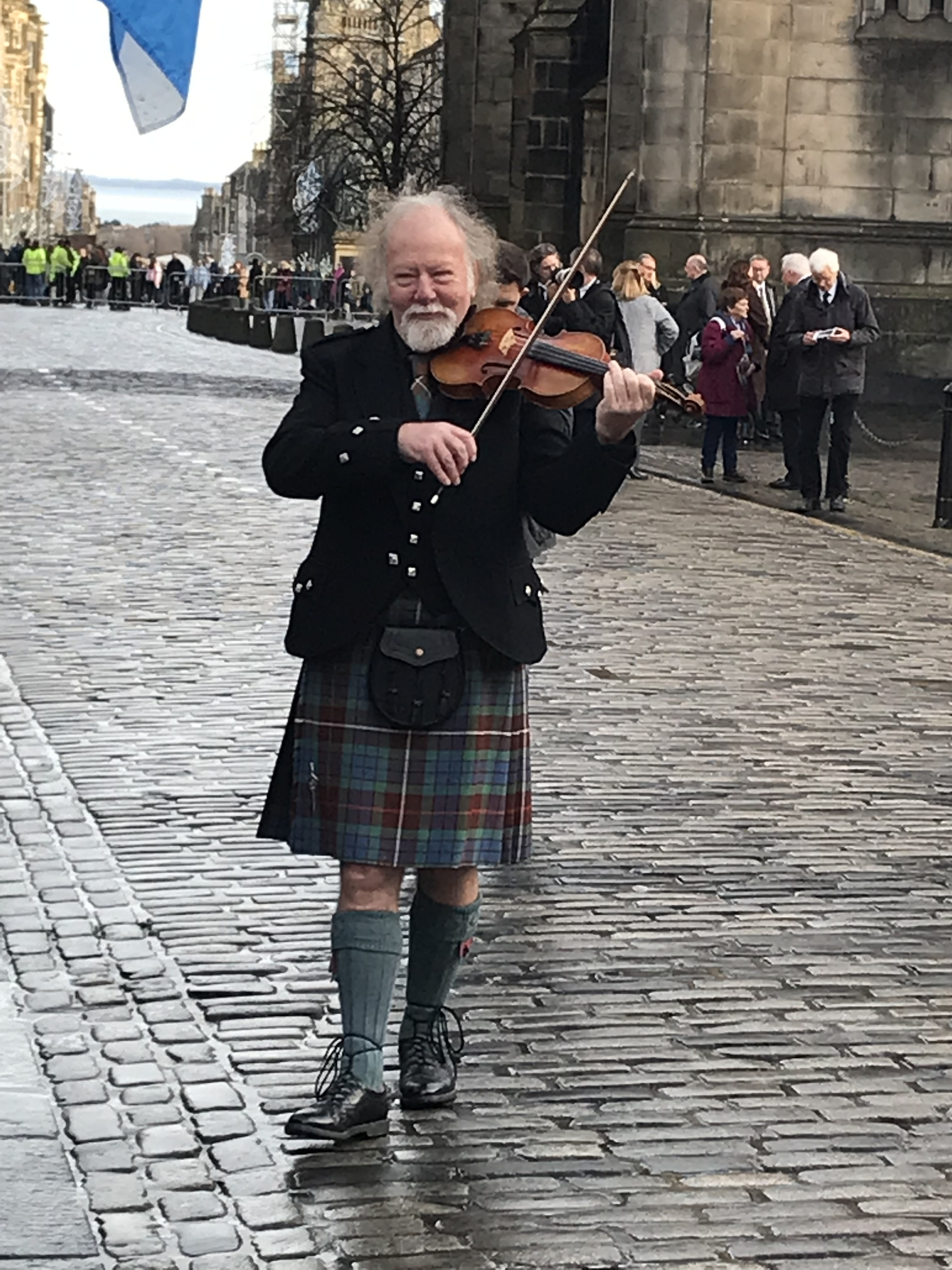
Fraser following Alex Salmond's memorial service in November 2024

== Discography ==
- Portrait of a Scottish Fiddler, Solo album -released 1982
- Skyedance, with Paul Machlis (Keyboards, Piano) - released 1985
- The Road North, with Paul Machlis (Keyboards, Piano) - released 1987
- The Driven Bow, with Jody Stecher (Guitar) - released 1989
- Dawn Dance, Solo album - released 1996
- Way Out to Hope Street, with Skyedance Band - released 1997
- Return to Kintail, with Tony McManus (Guitar) - released 1999
- Labyrinth, with Skyedance Band - released 2000
- Legacy of the Scottish Fiddle, Vol 1, with Paul Machlis (Piano) and Natalie Haas (Cello) - released 2002
- Live in Spain, with Skyedance Band - released 2002
- Legacy of the Scottish Fiddle, Vol 2, with Muriel Johnstone (Piano) and Natalie Haas (Cello) - released 2004
- Fire and Grace, Alasdair Fraser & Natalie Haas - released 2004 (winner, Scots Trad Album of the Year)
- In the Moment, Alasdair Fraser & Natalie Haas - released 2007
- Highlander's Farewell, Alasdair Fraser & Natalie Haas - released 2011
- Abundance, Alasdair Fraser & Natalie Haas - released 2014
- Ports of Call, Alasdair Fraser & Natalie Haas - released 2017
- Syzygy, Alasdair Fraser & Natalie Haas - released 2021

== Compilation appearances ==
- The Narada Wilderness Collection
- Celtic Odyssey (Narada)
- Celtic Dance (Narada)
- The Narada Nutcracker
- Treasure Planet soundtrack (featured soloist, co-composer on "Silver Leaves" (contains "Alasdair Fraser's Compliments to Lorna Mitchell"))
