= Coin shooting pistol =

Devices for firing common currency

Coin shooting pistols are devices designed to fire common currency of various denominations.

One of the earliest known in the United States is for a patent filed November 11, 1909, by Theodore Zens. No known examples exist today. Two patents exist for quarter-shooting pistols designed for shooting coins at toll booth baskets from 1965 and 1988.

The first commercial production of a coin shooting pistol was by MacGlashan Air Machine Gun Company. MacGlashan was better known for the air-powered machine guns that fired steel BB's used by the Army Air Corp, and the US Navy as an aerial gunnery trainer.

In 1945 MacGlashan introduced the "New Coin Shooting Pistol" designed for the amusement park and carnival business. MacGlashan designed their pistol to shoot an American nickel providing booth operators income from the coins used to try to win prizes. Original expectations were for the booth operator to set prizes on shelves that would have to be knocked off the shelf to win. Coins would be trapped by a cloth behind the prizes and operators would simply collect their day's earnings from under the prizes.

In 1946 MacGlashan began offering colorful targets designed to have five "aces" that would have to be knocked down to win from a selection of prizes.

MacGlashan coin shooting pistol

Today very few of these coin shooting guns exist.

== External images ==
- Aug. 4, 1945 edition Billboard Magazine Adverstisement for the "New" coin shooting pistol.
- Mar. 30, 1946 edition Billboard Magazine Throw away your corks, use nickels instead!
- Jun 29, 1946 edition Billboard magazine Advertisement describing the new colorful targets.
- Images and disassembly instructions of the MacGlashan Coin Shooting Pistol
