= Alexander McGlashan =

Alexander McGlashan (c.1740 – May 1797) was a Scottish violinist, bandleader and editor of music collections.

== Life ==
McGlashan flourished in Edinburgh, where he was a spirited leader of the most fashionable band in the city. He regularly gave concerts at St Cecilia's Hall. He was known as "King McGlashan" because of his commanding presence and showy style of dress.

He gave lessons to the violinist and composer Nathaniel Gow. He died in Edinburgh in May 1797, and was buried there in Greyfriars Kirkyard.

== Publications ==
He edited three volumes of Scottish music:

- A Collection of Strathspey Reels (1780)
- A Collection of Scots Measures (1781)
- A Collection of Reels (1786)
