= Niel Gow =

Scottish musician (1727-1807)

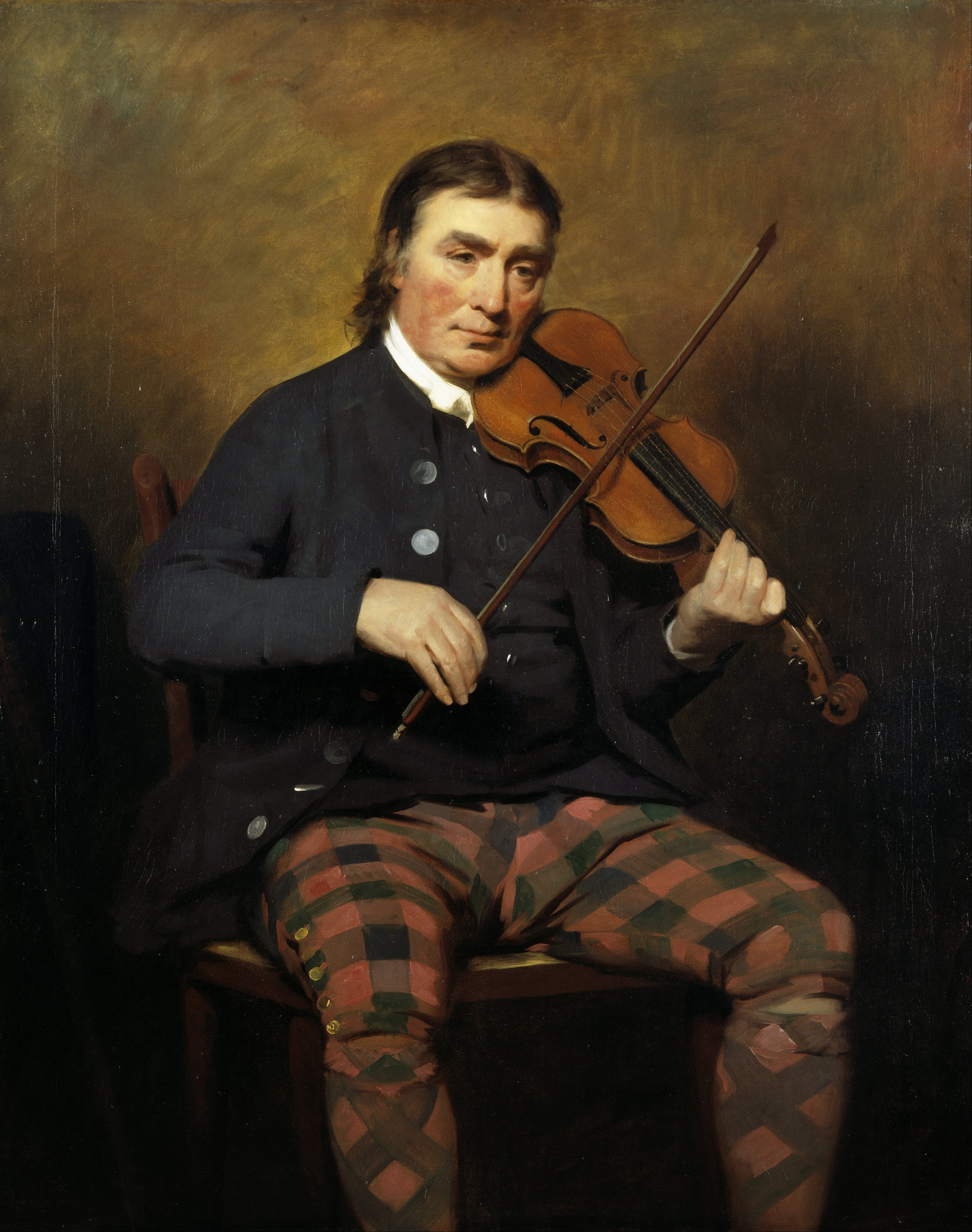
- Portrait of Niel Gow, 1787, by Sir Henry Raeburn

Background information
- Born: March 22, 1727; Strathbraan, Perthshire, Scotland
- Died: 1 March 1807 (aged 79) Inver, Perthshire, Scotland
- Occupations: Musician; composer
- Instrument: Fiddle

Niel Gow (22 March 1727 – 1 March 1807) was a Scottish fiddler in the eighteenth and nineteenth centuries.

== Early life ==
Gow was born in Strathbraan, Perthshire, in 1727, as the son of John Gow and Catherine McEwan. The family moved to Inver in Perthshire when Niel was an infant. He started playing the fiddle when very young, and at age 13 received his first formal lessons from John Cameron (1717–1796) of Grandtully.

In spite of being something of a musical prodigy, he originally trained as a weaver, but eventually gave up that trade to become a full-time musician. He was widely considered the best fiddle player in Perthshire, an area which was renowned for its musicians—the story goes that at age 18 he entered a competition that was being judged by John McCraw, a blind musician, who awarded him the first prize and then went on to claim that he "would ken his bow hand among a hunder players" (detect Niel's style among a hundred players). This attracted the attention of the Duke of Atholl, who became Gow's patron, and also ensured his employment for balls and dance parties put on by the local nobility. In time he became renowned as a fiddler.

== Musical career ==
According to John Glen (1895), Gow composed, or is credited with composing, eighty-seven dance tunes, "some of which are excellent." These tunes form the backstay of Scottish country dance music even today. However, it must be said that he was not above claiming good material from other composers as his own; Glen claims that at least a quarter of the eighty-seven tunes are either derived from older tunes or are copies of tunes published earlier elsewhere, often under a different title. The Biographical Dictionary of Eminent Scotsmen indicates that Gow's air of Locherroch Side was the basis for Robert Burns' ballad, "Oh! stay, sweet warbling Woodlark, stay." This "borrowing" was a common practice at the time and it did not seem to hurt his reputation; Henry Raeburn was commissioned to paint him several times.

Many of Gow's compositions are still played today at ceilidhs and country dances. He himself spelled his name Niel, although others sometimes spell it Neil or even Neal. The National Records of Scotland attest that Gow himself used the name 'Neil'. To add to the confusion, he had a musical grandson (by Nathaniel) who did spell his name "Neil".

The annual Niel Gow Fiddle Festival takes place in Dunkeld and Birnam, Perthshire, Scotland. It was established in 2004 to celebrate the life and music of Gow, including a fund raising campaign to erect a memorial to him in Dunkeld and Birnam.

== Later life ==
Gow was married twice. His first wife was Margaret Wiseman, and they had five sons and three daughters. His sons William, Andrew (1760), Nathaniel (1763), and John (1764) all followed their father as fiddlers and composers of fiddle music; two of the daughters were Margaret (1759) and Grizel (1761). The youngest son, Daniel (1765), died in infancy; William died in 1791 at age 40, and Andrew died in 1794 at 34. Of Niel's sons, Nathaniel had nearly two hundred tunes to his credit.

As a widower, Gow married Margaret Urquhart from Perth in 1768, and they went on to share a happy marriage until she died in 1805, which prompted his composition of one of his most famous tunes: "Niel Gow's Lament for the Death of his Second Wife".

Gow died at Inver on 1 March 1807, aged 79 or 80.

Following on from the efforts of the fund-raising campaign, a memorial statue of Gow was commissioned with David Annand as sculptor. It was finally erected and unveiled in December 2020.

The 20th-century English composer David Gow is a descendant of Gow. He commemorated the connection in his Six Diversions on an Ancestral Theme.

== Contributions ==
=== Compositions ===
- Admiral Nelson
- Niel Gow's Lament For the Death of His Second Wife
- Dunkeld Bridge
- Farewell to Whisky
- The Stool of Repentance
- The Duchess of Athole’s Skipper
- The Athole Volunteers March
- Miss Stewart of Grantully
- Highland Whisky
- Niel Gow’s Lamentation for James Moray, Esq., of Abercarney
- Major Graham of Inchbrakie
- Lady Ann Hope’s Favourite
- The Earl of Dalhousie's Happy Return to Scotland

=== Recordings ===
- Quadriga Consort CD "By Yon Bonnie Banks" ORF Early Music Edition, Vienna 2007
- Scotland's Pete Clark: In the Footsteps of Niel Gow
- Even Now, The Music of Niel Gow by Pete Clark, Smiddymade, 1998
- Niel Gow’s Fiddle by Pete Clark & Muriel Johnstone, Inver 229, 2017

== See also ==
- Niel Gow's Oak
