= Jean Milligan =

Scottish dancer and teacher

- Born: Jean Callander Milligan; 9 July 1886; Glasgow, Scotland, U.K.
- Died: 28 July 1978 (aged 92)
- Occupations: Physical educator, arts administrator, promoter of Scottish country dance

Jean Callander Milligan (9 July 1886 – 28 July 1978) was a physical education teacher at Jordanhill College who founded the Scottish Country Dance Society. She is credited with creating the modern incarnation of Scottish country dance.

== Early life and education ==
Miss Milligan was the daughter of educators James Milligan and Isabella Milligan. She was considered a fragile child after surviving rheumatic fever, and did not attend school until she was nine years old. Then, she attended Garnethill School (Glasgow High School for Girls), where her father was the headmaster. She trained to teach physical education at Dartford College, where she was a student of Martina Bergman-Österberg.

== Career ==
Miss Milligan learned some traditional dances, recipes, and handiwork skills from her mother, and performed Morris dancing at a 1910 festival. She taught physical education at Dundas Vale Training College in Glasgow, where she started the school's netball and hockey clubs, and after 1931 at Jordanhill College. During World War I, she went to Malta to volunteer at a military hospital.

Miss Milligan and Ysobel Stewart co-founded the Scottish Country Dance Society in Glasgow in 1923. She and Stewart ran an annual summer school beginning in 1927. In 1946 she attended the International Youth Festival with a troupe of 66 dancers, and in 1948 she represented the Scottish Country Dance Society at a meeting of the International Folk Music Council in Basel.

She retired from school teaching in 1948, and worked full-time on representing Scottish dance, travelling to North America, Australia, New Zealand, and elsewhere on behalf of the society. In 1973 she was named Scotswoman of the Year by the Glasgow Evening Times. In 1977, the University of Aberdeen awarded Milligan an honorary Doctor of Laws degree.

Miss Milligan was a member of the Glasgow committee of the National Fitness Council, the Scottish League for Physical Education (Women), and the advisory board of the Journal of School Hygiene and Physical Education. She was dance advisor to the Scottish Film Council.

== Publications ==
- The Scottish Country Dance (1925)
- Won't You Join the Dance? A Manual of Scottish Country Dancing
- Dances of Scotland (1951, with Donald G. MacLennan)
- 101 Scottish Country Dances (1957)
- 99 More Scottish Country Dances (1963)
- Introducing Scottish Country Dancing (1968, with Irene Stewart)

== Personal life and legacy ==
Miss Milligan lived in a tenement in Glasgow during World War II. She died in 1978. Her centenary was marked by the City of Glasgow in 1986. In March 2024 she featured in a podcast episode about Scottish women and dance. The "Miss Jean Milligan" reel is named for her.

Many Scottish country dances and tunes are named after Milligan. Dances include:

- Miss Milligan's Travels, devised by Ben Stein
- Salute to Miss Milligan, by John Drewry
- Miss Milligan's Strathspey
- Welcome to Miss Milligan, by Liliane Chamoine
- A Tribute to Miss Milligan, by Jean Riddell
- Second Salute to Miss Milligan, by Priscilla Burrag
