= Music session =

Social gathering to perform music

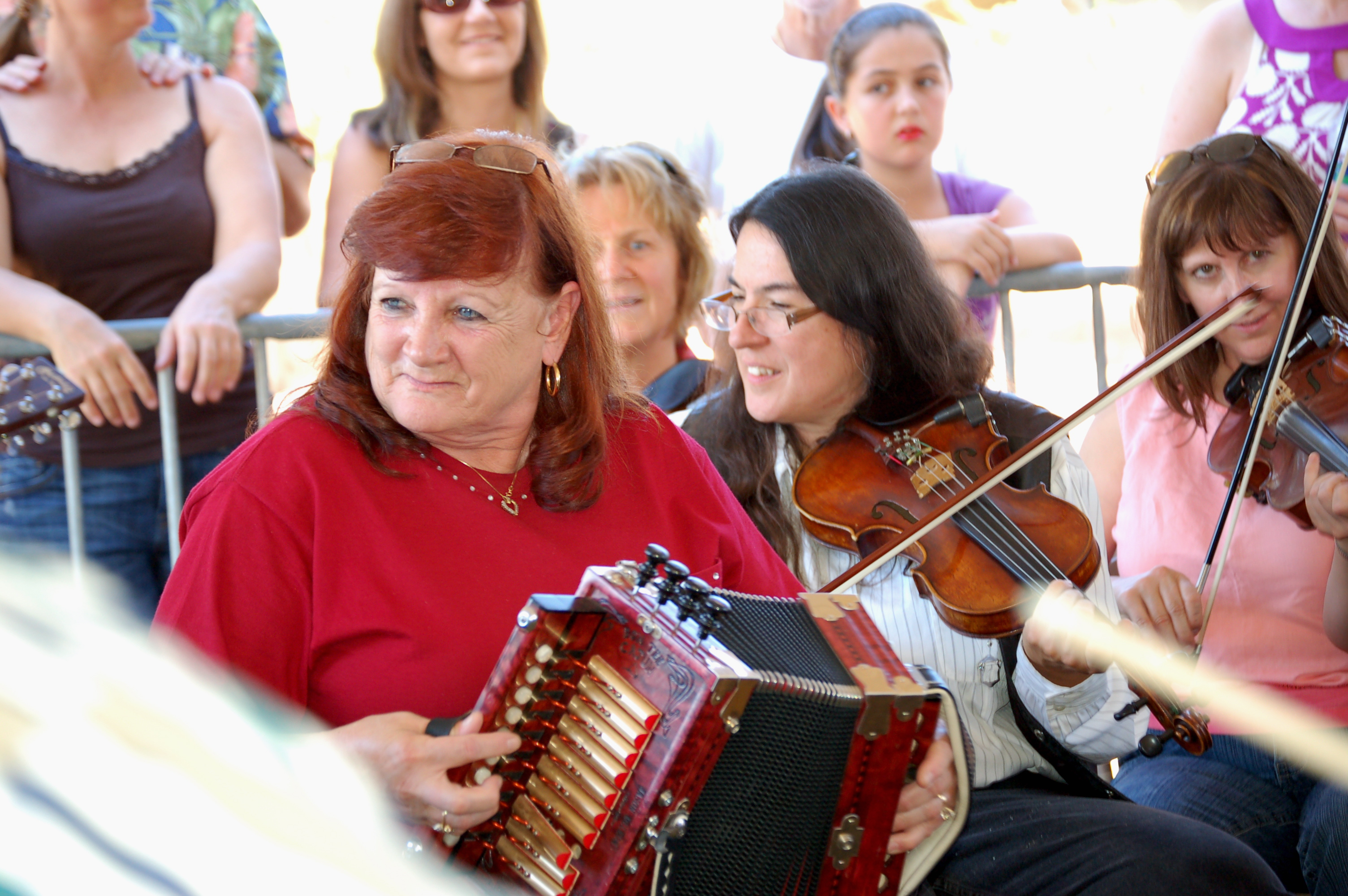
A Cajun music "jam session"

A music session is a social gathering of musicians and singers who perform music in a relatively informal context. Much of the music performed at such events is traditional music for the area, popular songs and other well-known tunes. In sessions, the participants typically improvise the accompaniment, song arrangements and musical ornaments to the melodies of songs or tunes. The venue may be a public bar, tavern, village hall or a private home.

The events usually occur at regular intervals and a weekday evening may be chosen if professional musicians are expected to take part, so that it does not interfere with paid weekend gigs. More amateur players may organize a session on a weekend. At a session, musicians usually play or sing for pleasure and to socialize. Frequently the musicians and singers are unpaid. However, one or two musicians (usually experienced players or professionals) are paid to 'lead' a session and to encourage others to join in. In a jazz or blues jam, the venue may pay a small "house band" (typically a rhythm section) to provide accompaniment.

== Terminology ==
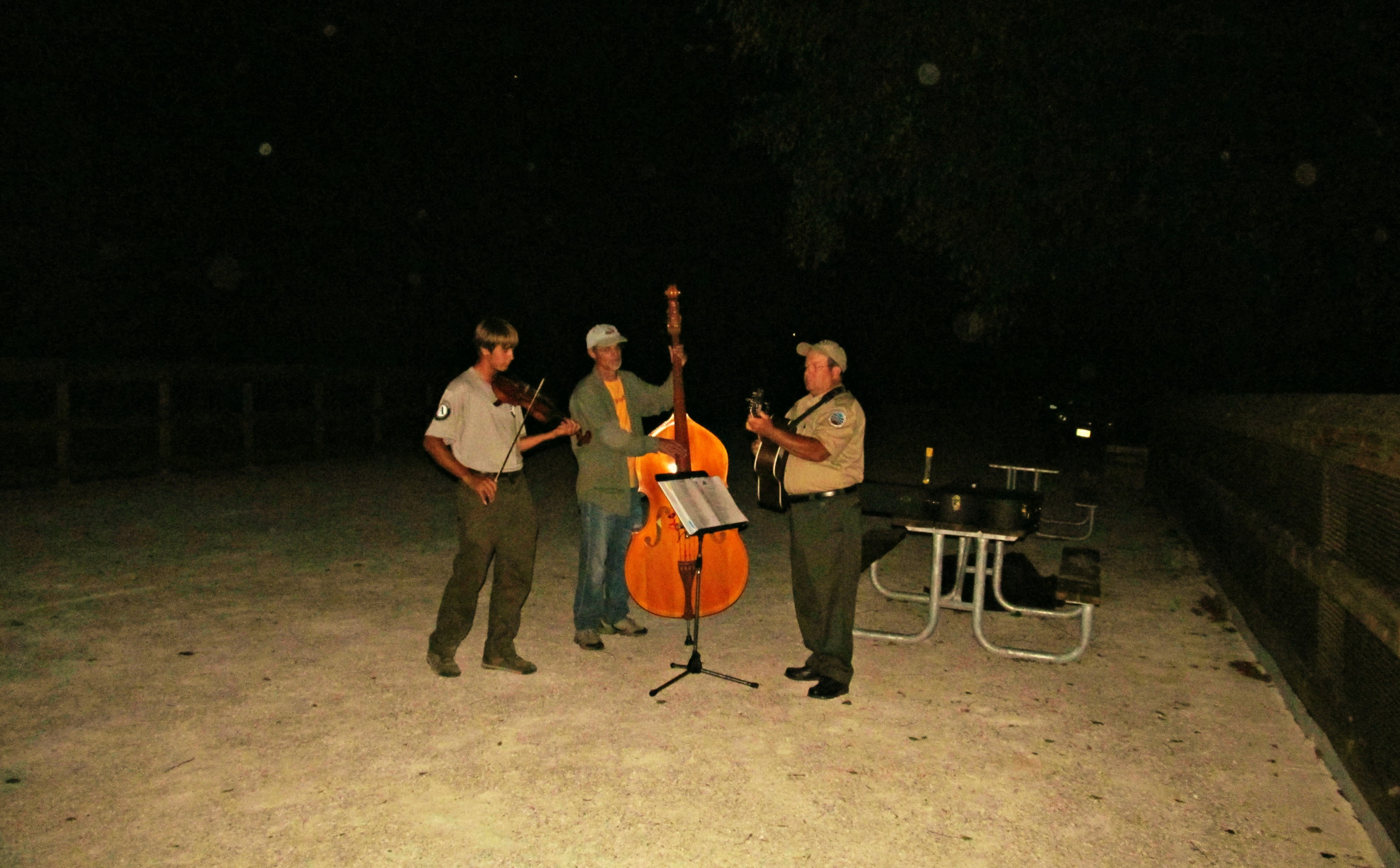
An outdoor jam session with acoustic instruments.

Depending on the genre and region, music sessions may be called a "traditional music session", "session", or in jazz and blues, a "jam session" or "jam".

== Cultural role ==
The music session forms an important part of Scottish and Irish culture (see Irish traditional music session). Often such events form an integral part of music festivals. The festival will often consist of a series of concerts by local groups, well-known or famous bands or entertainers. It is quite common for the local amateurs and touring professional musicians to meet after the concerts and have a "session" late in the evening. These sessions may continue into early hours of the morning. In jazz and blues, "jam sessions" are an important part of the musical culture.

== Instruments ==
=== Scottish and Irish traditional music ===
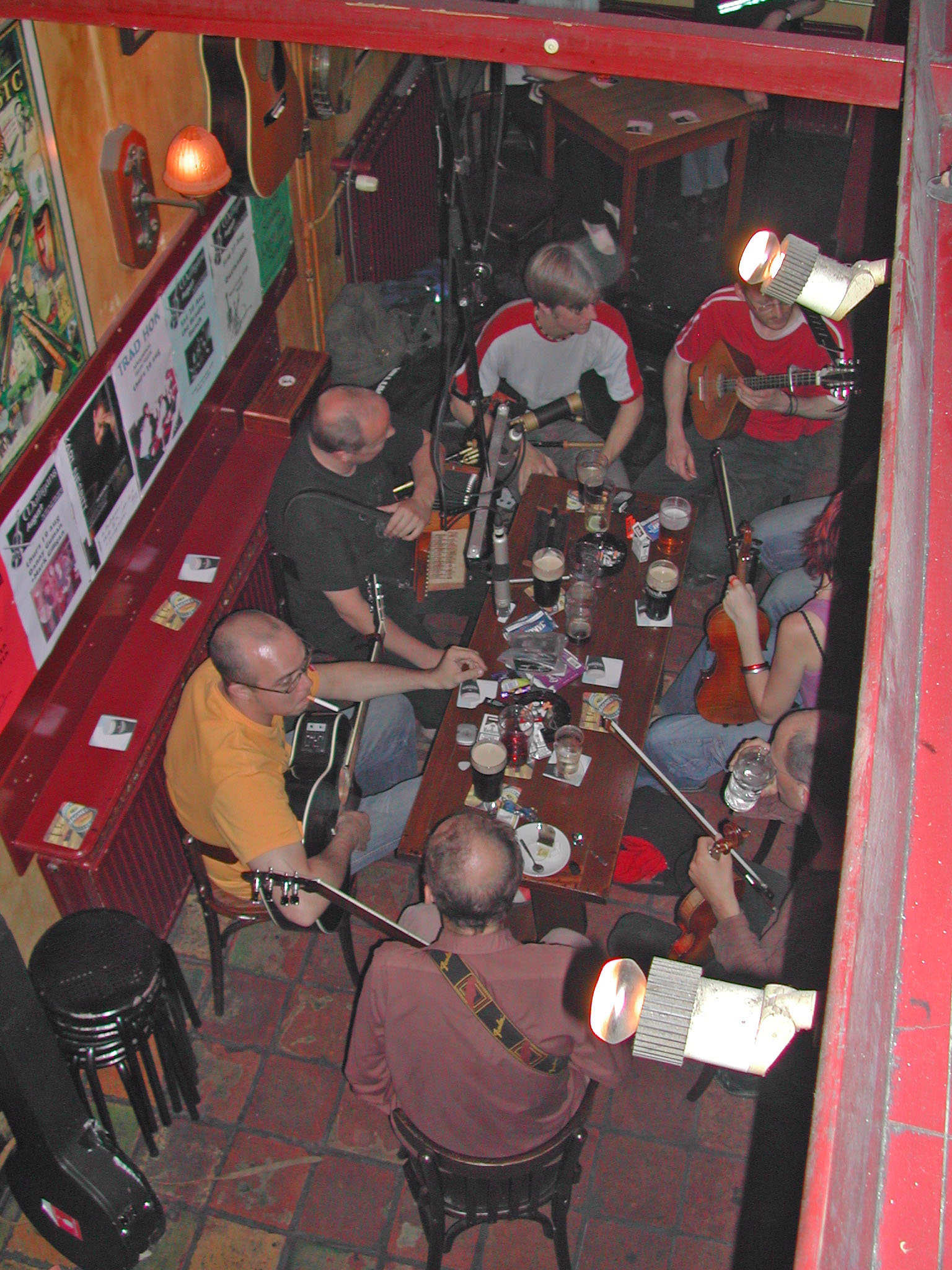
Irish music enthusiasts gather at a pub to play and drink beer

Usually traditional sessions are based around acoustic instruments. In Scotland as in Ireland, the most popular instruments include acoustic guitar, fiddle, accordion, mandolin, pipes, whistle, and sometimes double bass. Because an acoustic guitar is relatively quiet, guitarists often experience difficulty being heard over louder instruments such as accordions and whistles.

A small amplifier may be used to bring the guitar up to an audible level. However, there are a number of traditionalists who resent the use of guitar amplifiers at an otherwise acoustic session.

Depending on the session, some beginning performers may use chord charts or sheet music or no music notation at all, which is typically the case at a session with experienced participants and/or professionals. In sessions where no music notation is used, the participants or leader "call" well-known tunes that the other performers know "by ear", either by stating the title aloud, or more simply by starting into the melody.

=== Jazz and blues ===
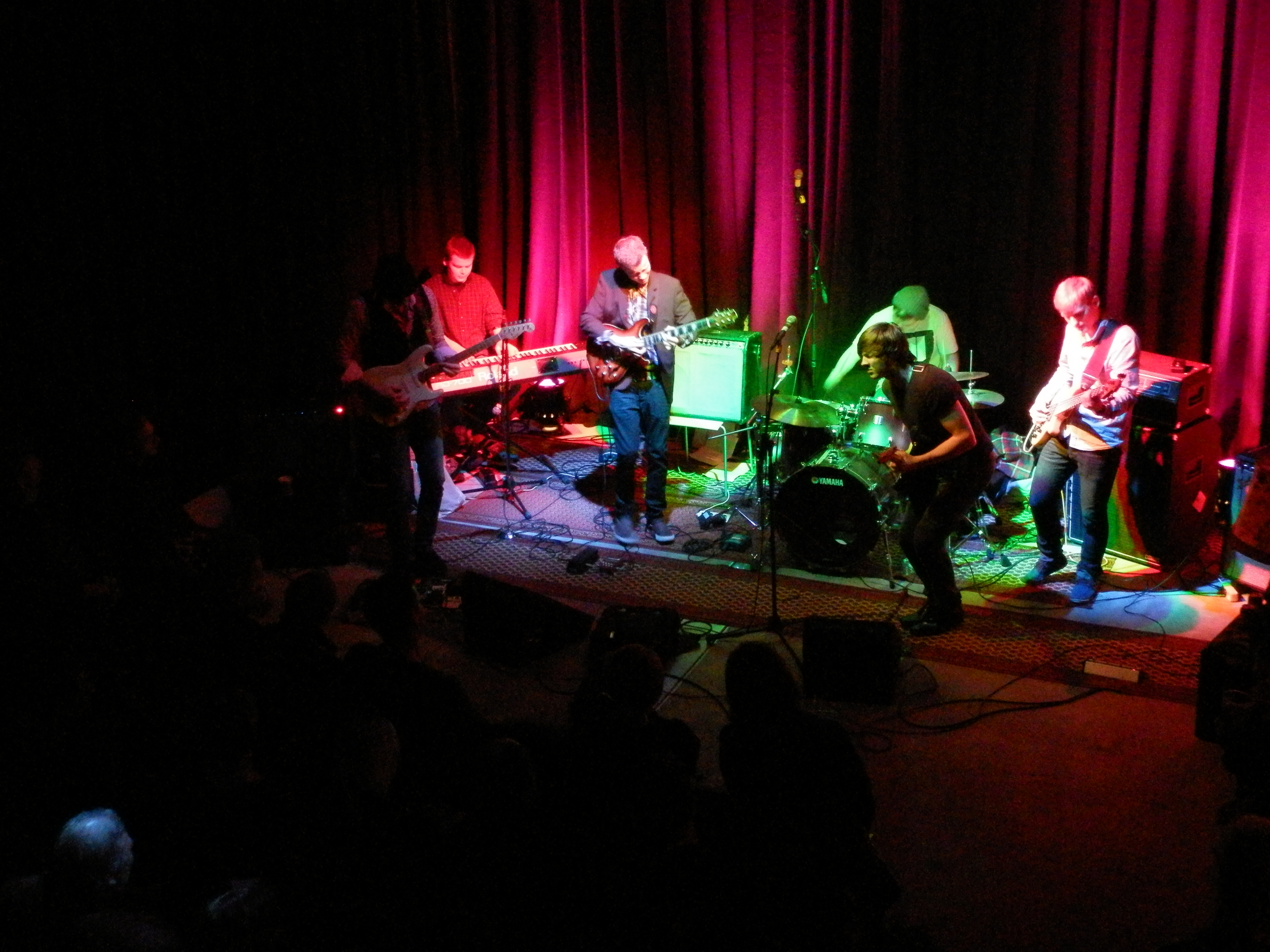
A 2014 blues jam.

In jazz and blues (and related genres and subgenres), a session is typically called a jam session or a jam. Jam sessions often take place after musicians and singers have finished their paid gigs for the evenings. Jams often take place at nightclubs or bars. Jams may include both professional instrumentalists and singers and talented amateurs. Some venues have a "house band" or backing band, a paid rhythm section that includes one or two chordal instrumentalists (e.g., piano, Hammond organ, electric guitar, etc.), a bassist (e.g., electric bass or double bass) and a drummer.

In jazz, jam participants include "horn players" ("horn" in jazz parlance means any of the wind or brass instruments used in the genre, including saxophone, trumpet, trombone, etc.), rhythm section instrumentalists (who typically "sit in for" or replace one of the house band members) and singers. At more amateur jazz jam sessions, the performers may use lead sheets that contain the chord progression and melody of the song in music notation or fake books. At a more professional jam, performers may simply "call out" tunes, with the performers being expected to know the melody and chord changes.

At a blues jam, the session performers may include electric guitarists, harmonica ("blues harp") players and singers. At blues jams, the house band typically plays twelve bar blues and other blues song forms that are well known for the session participants to solo over. At blues jams, the guitar solo, typically played on electric guitar through an overdriven guitar amp, is an important type of solo.

== Role of leader ==
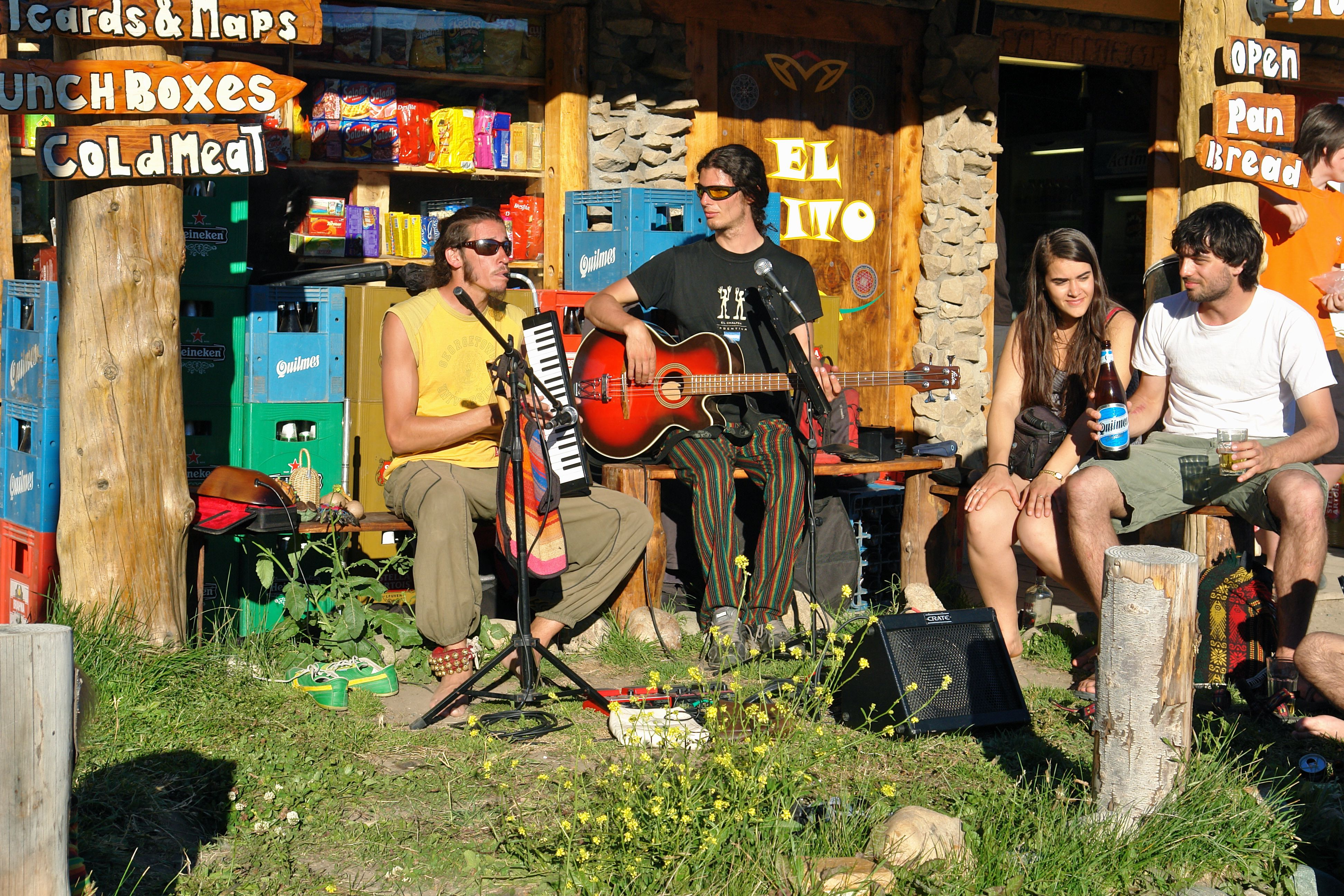
A jam session at El Chalten market.

Paid session leaders help to ensure that there will be music performances throughout the evening for members of the public who might wish to listen without participating. The leader also acts as a host and master of ceremonies for the event, introducing performers and, thanking them after their songs and calling for applause. The session leader selects players and singers who are skilled enough to deserve a solo performance, and politely asks inexperienced performers to wait for later in the session.

If a session performer is exceptionally skilled, the leader may encourage her to perform a number of songs or tunes. On the other hand, if a player or singer does not perform that well, due to a lack of experience or technique, the leader will thank the individual for his or her performance and then diplomatically ask for the audience's applause, while at the same time inviting a more seasoned performer on stage to take the first performer's place. Less skilled performers may be asked to participate as a member of an ensemble, playing an accompaniment role in the background.

Some session leaders use a sign-up sheet where participants can indicate their interest in performing. The session leader is often an accomplished singer and/or instrumentalist, and she typically performs throughout the evening, either in solo roles or "comping" for (accompanying) other performers. The session leader's ability to perform helps to fill in any periods during the evening where no participants have asked to come up.

== Purpose and recompense ==
The performers and singers who participate in an unpaid session typically do so for the enjoyment of performing and for the applause they receive from the audience. In jazz, jam sessions are often a good way for players and singers to meet other performers; in a sense, it can serve as a form of business networking for musicians. At a jam session, jazz musicians can hear other performers on stage, meet with them, and consider certain individuals for collaboration on future paid gigs or recording sessions. A jazz singer, for example, might use attendance and participation in jam sessions as a way to find potential members who she could hire as a rhythm section for her shows. A bandleader might use participation in jam sessions as a way to scout out new talent for her big band. In jazz, jam sessions are also an opportunity for informal learning, as players can show other performers new playing techniques or improvisation approaches.

The hospitality of the landlord or venue owner can also be important to the music session scene. Sometimes he or she might offer a round of drinks or tea, coffee and food to the performers, to thank them for their contribution to the entertainment of the audience.

== Paid concerts ==
As part of jazz festivals, the organizers sometimes arrange what are termed "jam sessions", which are concerts in which only professional musicians perform. While these shows may share the informal feel of regular jam sessions, they are different from the truly informal jam sessions that are held, at which both professionals and talented amateurs share the stage, and at which none of the solo performers (except the host/MC) are being paid.

== See also ==
- Jam band
