= Rosco McGlashan =

Australian drag racing and land speed record-holder

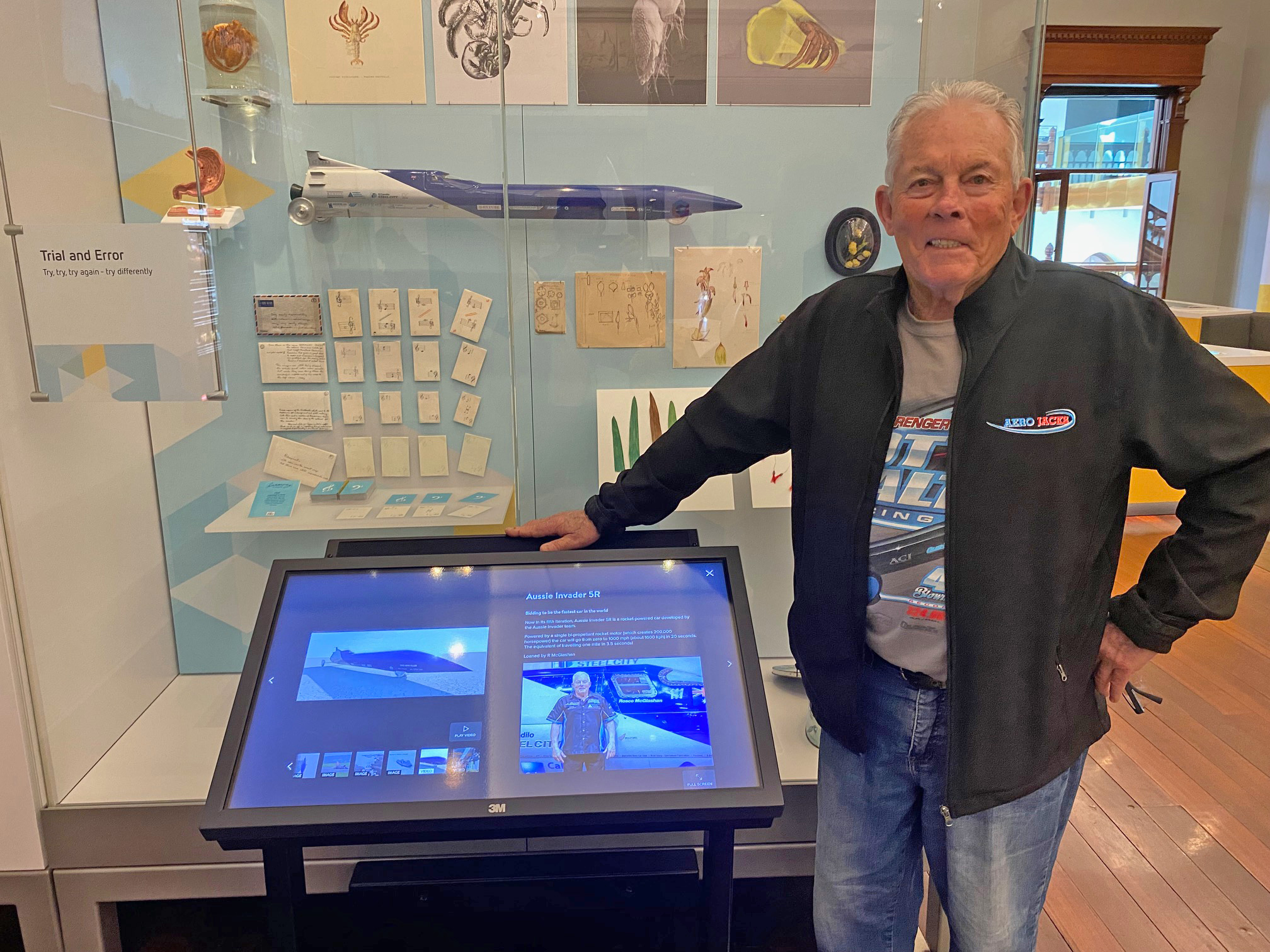

Rosco McGlashan OAM was born on 23 August 1950 in Subiaco, Western Australia. Rosco is an Australian drag racing champion, who currently holds the Australian land speed record at 500 mph (802.6 km/h). This record was set on the 27 March 1994 on the dry salt flats of Lake Gairdner, South Australia, 440 km (270 mi) northwest of Adelaide.

== Early Years & Racing Career ==
McGlashan left his home and school at the age of twelve to pursue his racing career. His first competitive drive was in a Pro-Stock drag car at Surfers Paradise drag strip, when the professional driver failed to show up. Rosco bettered the professional drivers' best quarter-mile time. He was the nominated driver from then on.

=== Krazy Horse ===
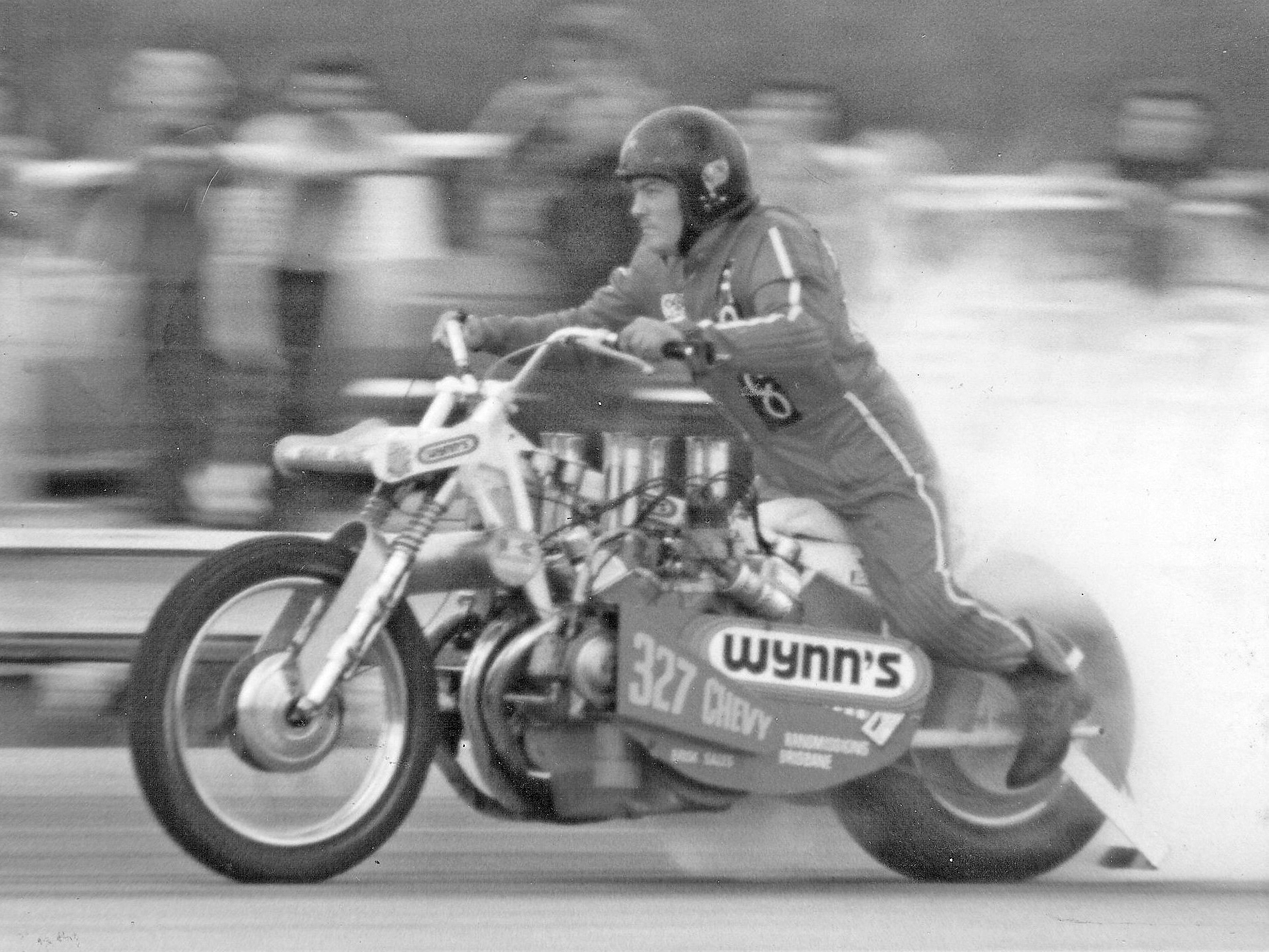

This was a drag bike with a V8 engine from a Pro Stock drag car. It was originally built by Wally Pushkey and his team and ridden by Pushkey as well. It had a 292 cu. in. Ford V8, with direct drive (no clutch) and Pushkey and McGlashan would rev it up to 5,000 rpm and rock it off a stand and Krazy Horse would leave rubber up the whole quarter-mile. McGlashan's best time was 9.1 seconds at 170 mph (275 km/h).

=== Rocket Bike ===
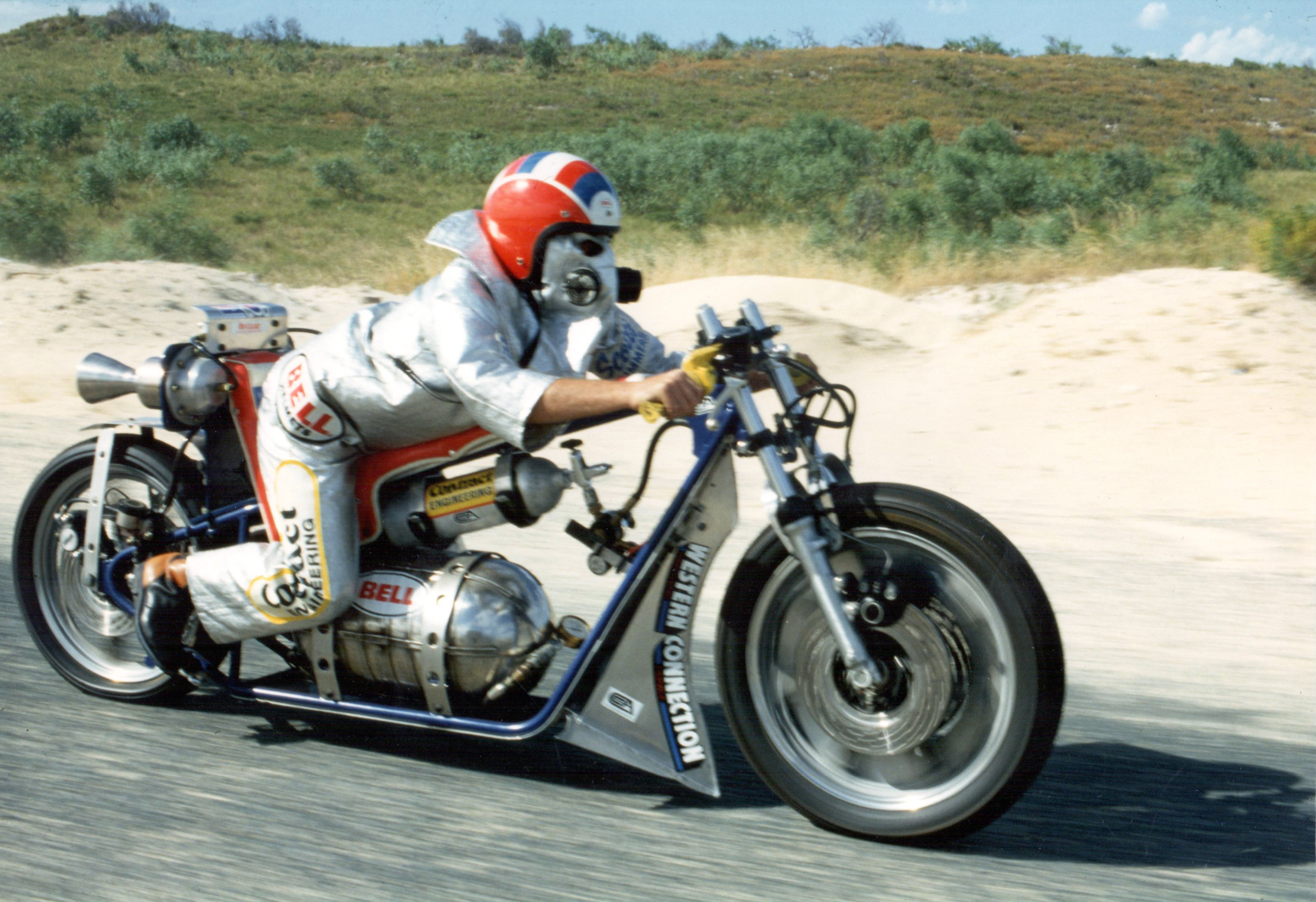

McGlashan built a hydrogen peroxide rocket bike in 1979/1980. It was never sanctioned to race and was banned by ANDRA, for being too dangerous.

=== Rocket Go-Kart ===
McGlashan also drove a rocket-powered go-kart to 253 miles per hour (407 km/h) in 1980 at a race track near Thousand Oaks, California. It was owned by USA drag racing driver "Fearless Fred" Goeske. Rosco bought it from Fred and brought it back to Australia. It was also banned by ANDRA, but the run in the USA is still the fastest a go-kart has ever run the 1/4 mile.

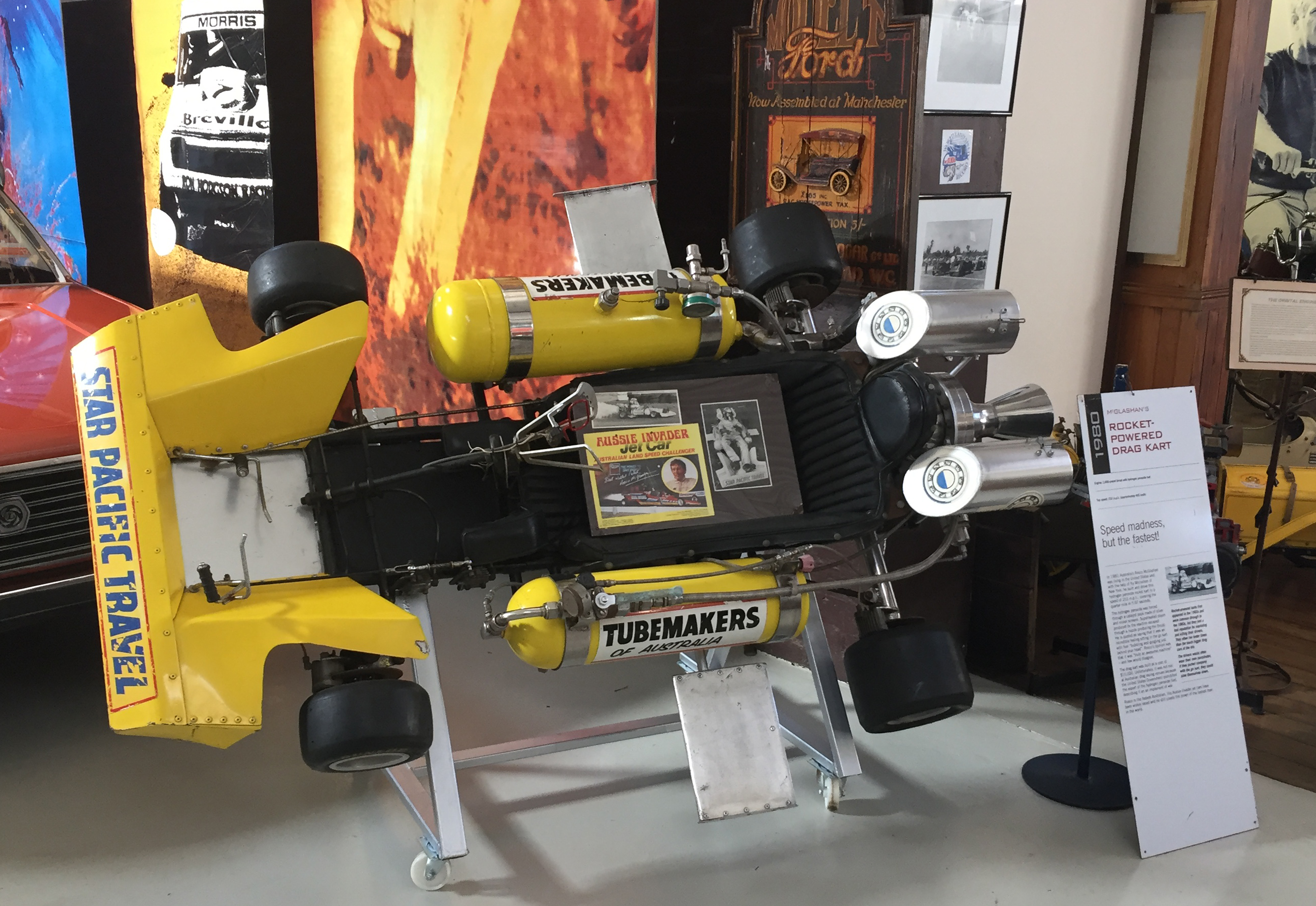
Fastest Go-Kart 0 - 253 mph in 5.97 seconds

However, this record is not recognized by Guinness world records, which has the go-kart record listed at 114.59 mph (184.41 km/h), less than half the speed achieved by Rosco.

== Aussie Invader 1 ==
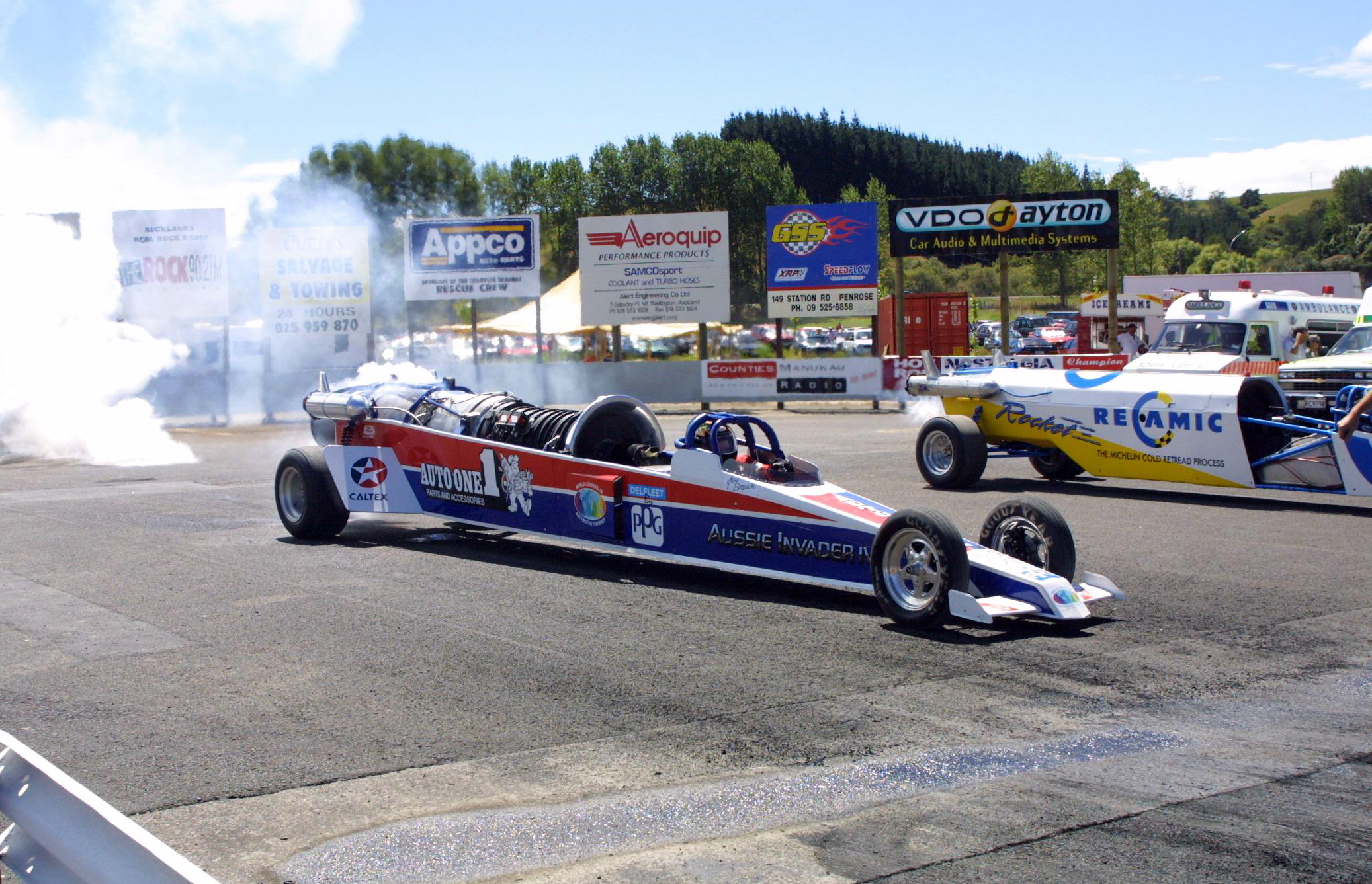

Aussie Invader 1 was initially owned by Ken Warby, who holds the World water speed record of 275.97 knots (511.10 km/h; 317.58 mph), set on Blowering Dam on 8 October 1978. Aussie Invader 1 was originally named 'US Invader' when Ken owned it. McGlashan bought it from Warby and renamed it to Aussie Invader. It later was renamed again to Aussie Invader 1, when McGlashan knew he would have other Aussie Invader jet cars.

It was powered by a Westinghouse J34 jet engine with a purpose-built afterburner. The engine was originally fitted to the Lockheed Neptune as a JATO engine producing about 6,500 lbs of thrust. Aussie Invader 1 set the unofficial Tasmanian land speed record in 1987 of 506 km/h (315 mph) in 1986. This happened at a promotional charity exhibition for the Lions Club of Hobart.

== Aussie Invader 2 ==
The construction of Aussie Invader 2 started in 1988. The car was powered by a 36,000 hp Atar jet engine from a Mirage jet fighter. It took four years to build and McGlashan's first attempt to set the Australian land speed record in Aussie Invader 2 was in December 1993. However, rain and poor salt/track conditions, meant they were unsuccessful.

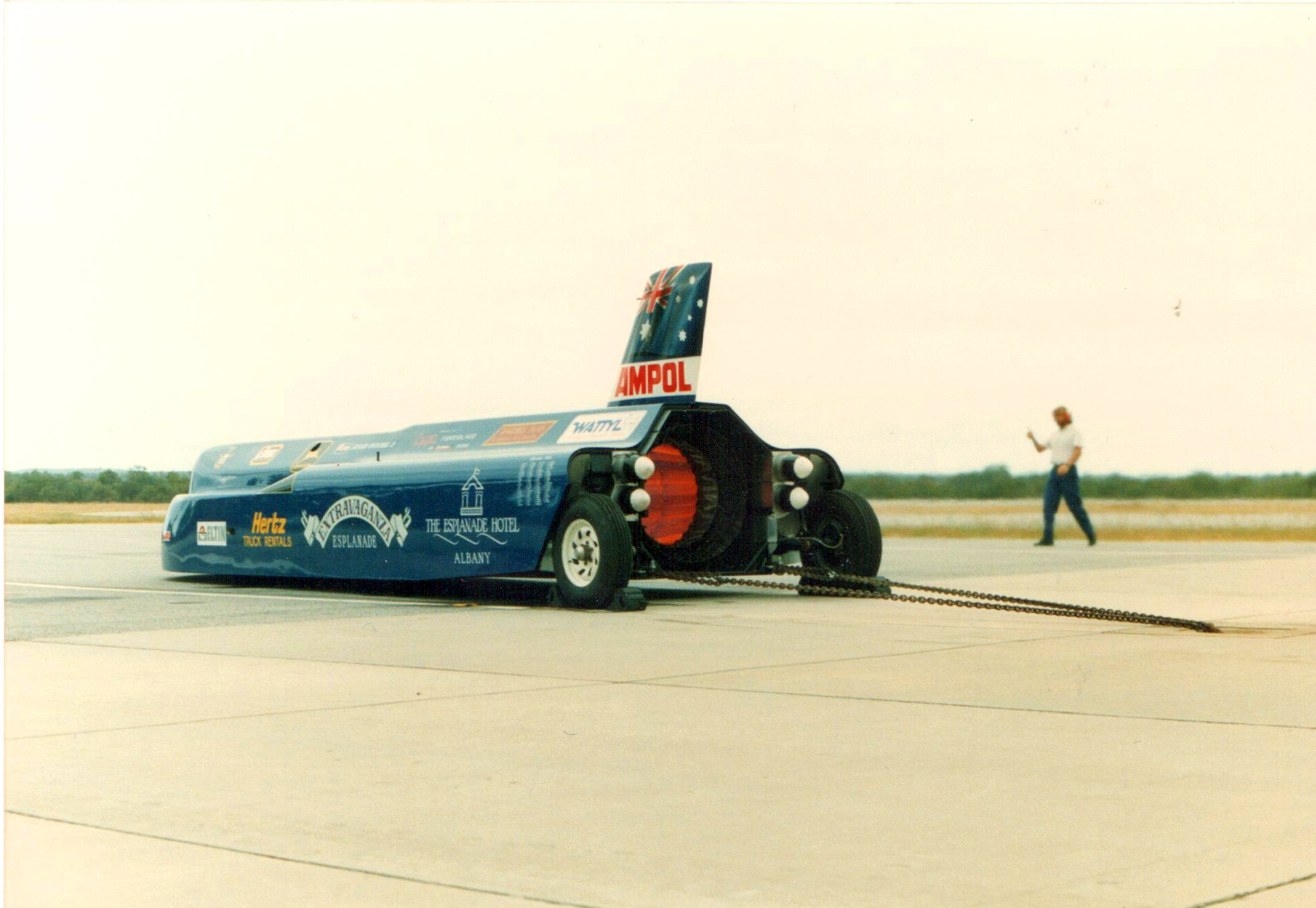

Rosco and the team returned in March 1994 and broke Donald Campbell's record set at Lake Eyre in 1964. After setting the Australian land speed record, Rosco and the team went after the world record, but the water had reduced the track length, and at close to 600 mph (960 km/h), McGlashan found they did not have enough track to stop, so faster speeds were out of the question. Once again they decided to pack up and return the following year, hoping for improved conditions.

The Aussie Invader team returned in February 1995 to Lake Gairdner for an assault on the 633.468 mph (1,013.55 km/h) world land speed record, held by Richard Noble. Once again the salt surface was poor, with the course being very wet in places. McGlashan ran off course and hit the metal timing stand at close to 600 mph. McGlashan was lucky to walk away but the car was destroyed.

== Aussie Invader 3 ==
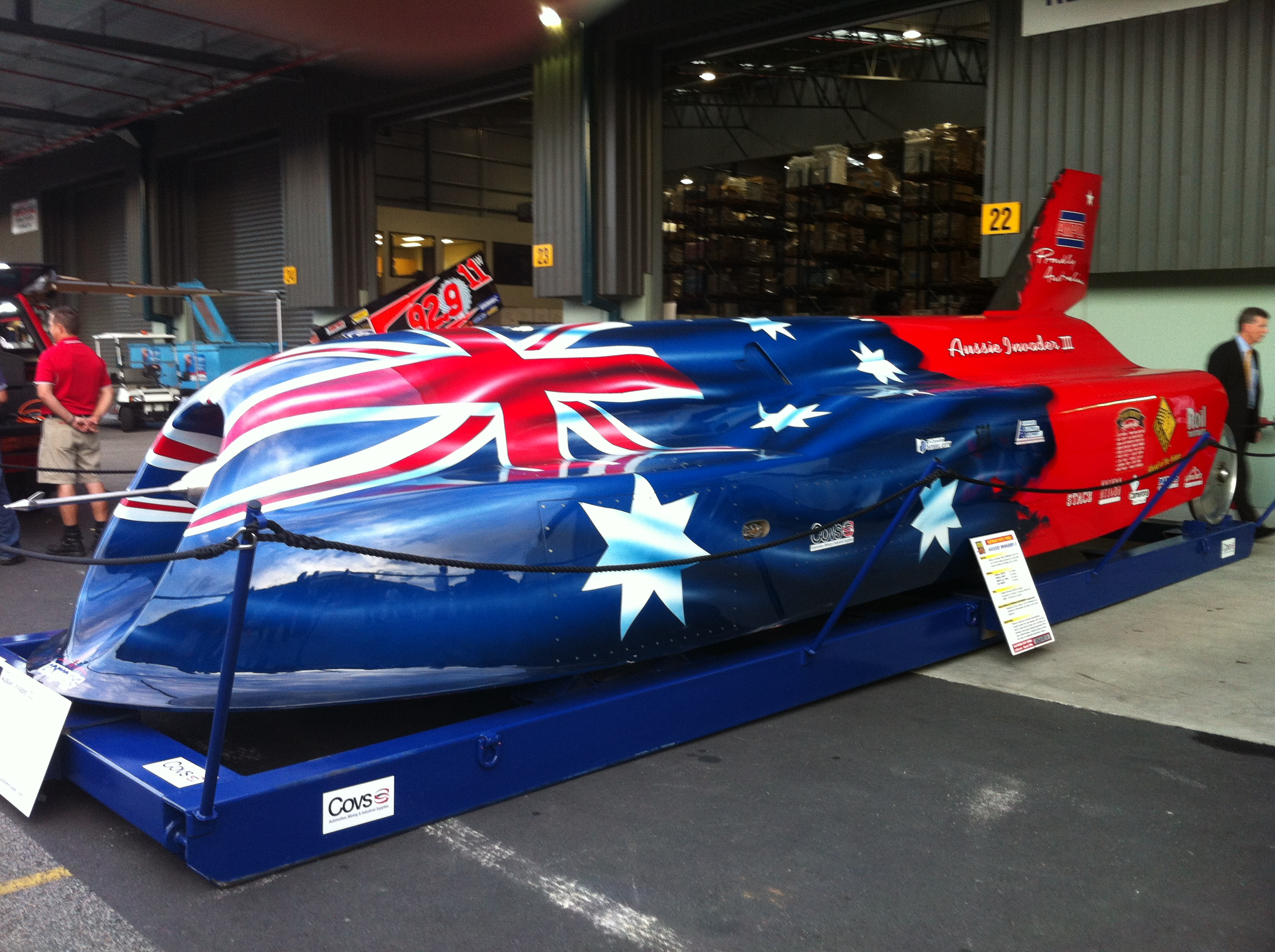

McGlashan then built his next car Aussie Invader 3, utilising another ATAR engine from a Mirage jet fighter. This car was better aerodynamically, and more powerful. McGlashan hoped to challenge Andy Green and Craig Breedlove to be the first to Mach 1 on land, but in 1996 again the salt conditions were too bad for high speed record runs. On 15 October 1997, Andy Green reached 763.035 miles per hour (1,227.986 km/h), the first supersonic record (Mach 1.016). This made Aussie Invader 3 redundant. So a new car was planned.

McGlashan did get a chance to drive Aussie Invader 3 at Lake Gairdner in March 2000, trying to better his Australian record. He did reach a peak speed of 638 mph (1,027 km/h), however poor salt and weather prevented a return run, so no new Australian record was recorded.

Aussie Invader 3 is the fastest car ever to be driven on a salt lake with solid (tyreless) wheels. In 2015. McGlashan sold Aussie Invader 3 to raise money for the Aussie Invader 5R project.

== Aussie Invader 4 ==
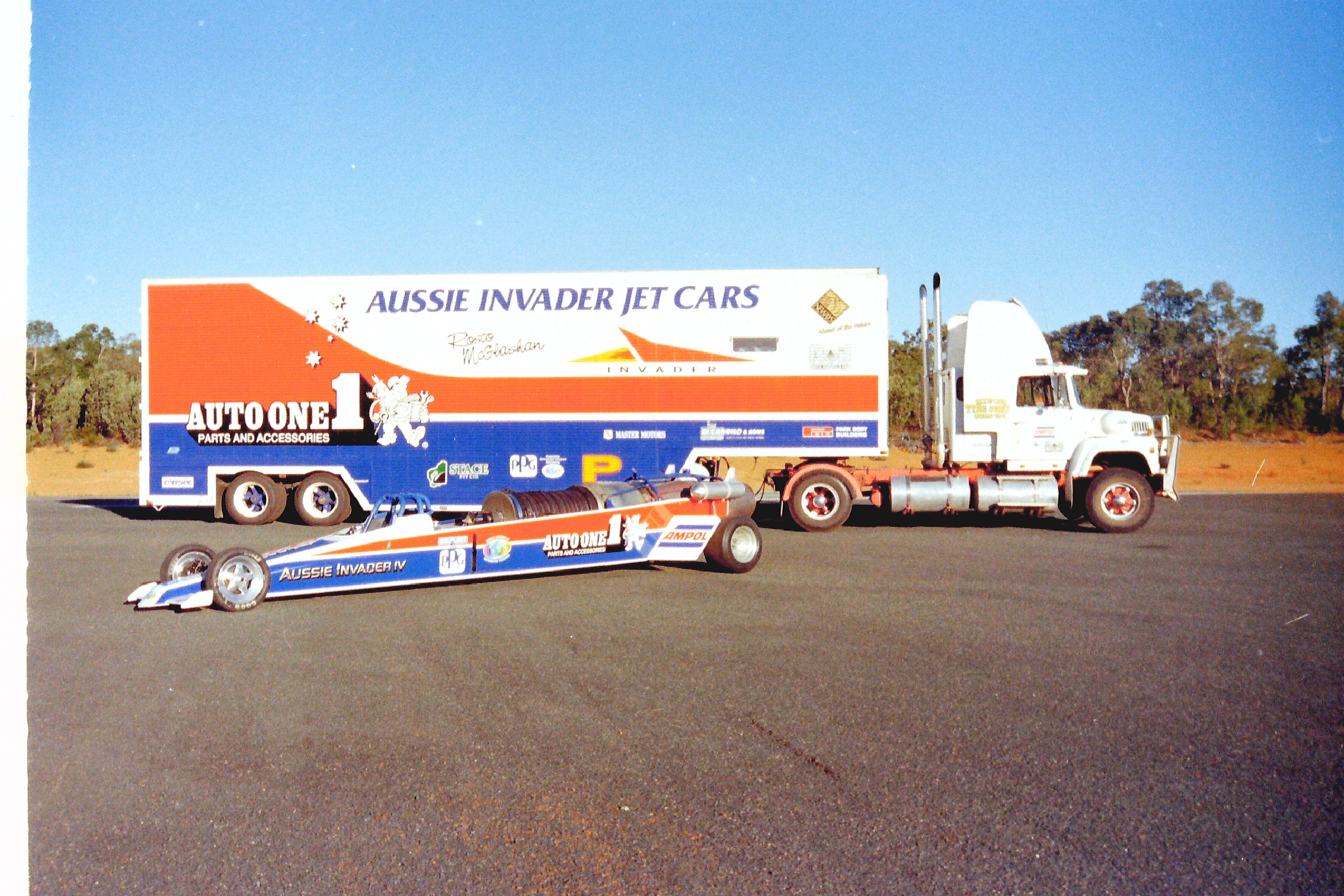

Like Aussie Invader 1, Aussie Invader 4 was powered by a J34 Westinghouse jet engine with a purpose-built afterburner and was capable of 0 – 280 mph (450 km/h) in about five seconds. It was completed in 1996 to race alongside Aussie Invader 1, which Rosco still raced at drag meetings, in between building and running his land speed cars.

== Aussie Invader 5R ==
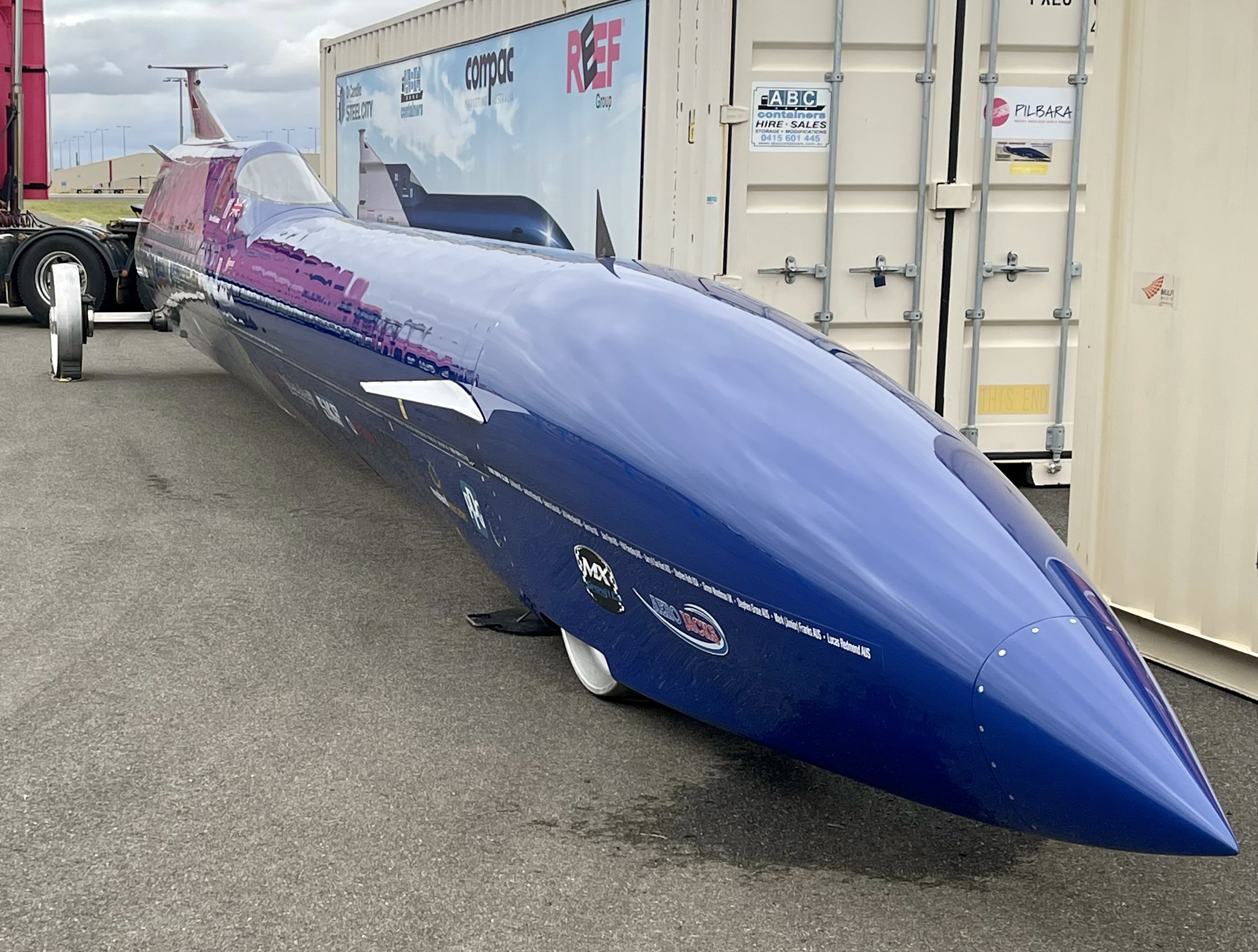

After Thrust SSC went Mach 1.02 (763 mph), McGlashan knew he needed a car with a lot more power. He started planning to build a rocket-powered car capable of exceeding the sound barrier and achieving a 1,000 miles per hour (1,600 km/h). Construction on the car started in 2009, after preliminary planning and design work, which took close to a decade before the build could start. Work on building Aussie Invader 5R has now reached the end of phase 1 (completed car with systems in place). Phase 2 is underway, trying to raise funding to test and fine-tune the 62,000-pound thrust rocket engine, which is equivalent to about 200,000 hp, about the power of 200 Formula One cars.

Aussie Invader 5R will be the biggest and most powerful land speed car McGlashan has built. It is 16m (52ft) in length and 3m (10ft) high at the tail fin. It will weigh 6.3 tonnes dry (unfuelled) and a massive 9.2 tonnes when loaded with propellants (fuel and oxidizer). It will burn around 2.5 tonnes of propellants in about 22 seconds on a full high-speed run. It will take about 3.5 miles (5.6 km) to get up to speed and run the measured and timed mile/kilometre. It will take about 8 miles (12.8 km) to stop.

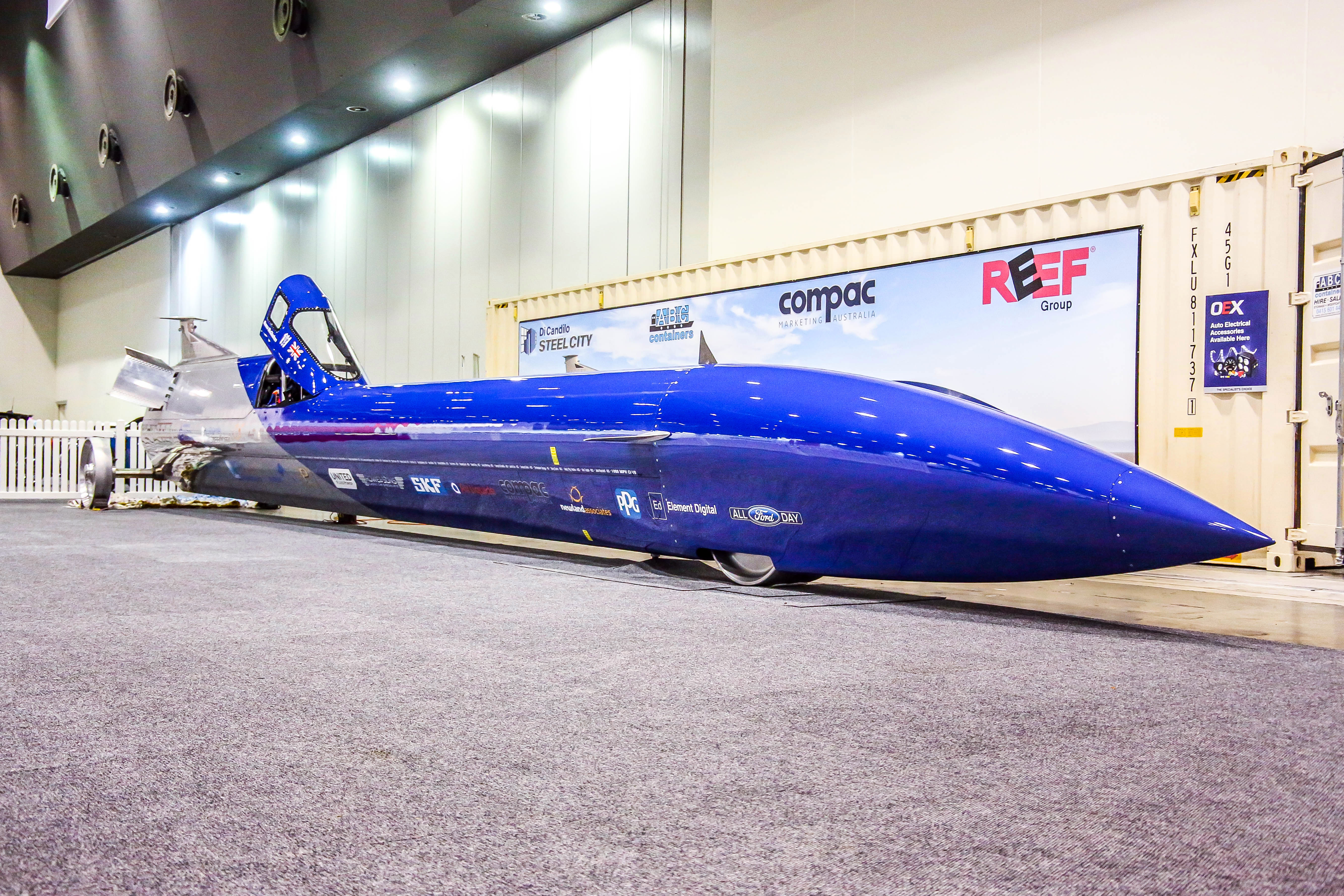

The car appeared at two Perth-based motor shows after externally the car looked complete in June 2018. Phase 2 is underway, raising money for the rocket motor and propellant testing.

=== Additional Information ===
A lot of the initial design and calculations for Aussie Invader 5R's performance were carried out by Peter Beck in 2009, who at the time was starting a company called Rocket Lab. Peter and Rocket Lab have gone on to do a lot of work for NASA.

On 7 January 2023, McGlashan's memoir was published by Mark J Read. The book is called ROSCO The Fastest Aussie on Earth. This book tells Rosco's life story from a tough childhood to a champion drag racer and land speed record holder. It has a lot of information about Rosco's life, cars and racing career.

== Awards and honours ==
- Awarded the Order of Australia Medal in 1998 by the Queen of England for his services to motorsport and for setting a new Australian Land Speed Record.
- Given the “Premiers Award”, Western Australia by the premier of the state Richard Court MLA in 1999.
- Given the ‘Key to the City’ of Perth, Western Australia by the Premier of the state Richard Court MLA in 1999.
- International Jet Dragster Competition Winner 1998, 1999, 2001.
- Entered in the Australian Roll of Honour by the Governor General Sir Michael Jefferies in 2001 as “The Fastest Aussie On Earth.”
- Confederation of Australian Motor Sport award 2001.
- Registered motivational speaker with International Celebrity Management Australia.
- Letters of Endorsement for our project from Australia's ex-Prime Minister John Howard and Defence Senator Robert Hill.
- In 2012 Rosco was inducted into the RAC's WA Walk of Fame, only one of 17 West Australians to be given that honour.
- Rosco was great friends with US Navy rocket engineer Robert Truax and featured in his life story documentary.

== See also ==
- List of vehicle speed records
- ThrustSSC Current record holder since 1997
- North American Eagle Project aiming for 808 mph (1,300 km/h)
- Bloodhound SSC aiming for 1,000 mph (1,600 km/h)
