= Alastair Robin McGlashan =

British Priest

Alastair Robin McGlashan (1933 – 19 June 2012) was a British Anglican priest, Tamil scholar and a Jungian analyst.

He published many books, including a critically acclaimed translation of Periyapuranam, a Saivite religious literature in Tamil.
