= Royal Scottish Country Dance Society =

- Abbreviation: RSCDS
- Formation: November 28, 1923; 102 years ago
- Type: Nonprofit organization
- Headquarters: Edinburgh, Scotland
- Region served: Worldwide
- Members: 11.621
- Executive Officer: Chris Milne
- Endowment: £1,736,651
- Website: www.rscds.org

The Royal Scottish Country Dance Society (RSCDS), was founded on 28 November 1923 as the Scottish Country Dance Society by Jean Milligan and Ysobel Stewart of Fasnacloich, who wanted to preserve country dancing as performed in Scotland, country dancing having fallen into disuse after the influx of continental ballroom dances such as the waltz or quadrilles and, later on, American-style dances like the One-step or foxtrot. The SCDS became the RSCDS in 1951.

The RSCDS collected dances from living memory as well as from old (17-19c.) manuscripts and republished them in a series of books. Most of these dances needed some interpretation, and the dance style itself underwent standardisation, becoming much more balletic instead of the easy-going style that was the norm in the early 20th century, and which the RSCDS's founders considered sloppy and untraditional. After some argument, in the late 1940s the RSCDS also started publishing newly devised dances.

Today the RSCDS numbers some 17,000 members all over the world, with headquarters in Edinburgh. The RSCDS offers teacher training and holds an annual summer school in St Andrews, Fife for four weeks in July and August. In addition to the annual summer school, the RSCDS offers a winter school in February and a youth orientated Spring Fling in April, which are held in the UK and Europe respectively.

== Committees ==
- The Youth Services Committee is responsible for representing the young musicians and dancers in the Royal Scottish Country Dance Society. They support the organisation of youth targeted events such as Spring Fling and The Families and Friends Weekend. The committee has a strong social media presence presenting the RSCDS as welcoming and inclusive to all ages.

Instagram - @rscds_young_dancers

- The Membership Services Committee promote the values of the RSCDS through new publications of scottish dance and music.
- The Education and Training Committee support training of teachers through their unit qualifications.

== See also ==
- List of Scottish country dances
