= Hastings Adobe =

Historic house in California, United States

- U.S. National Register of Historic Places
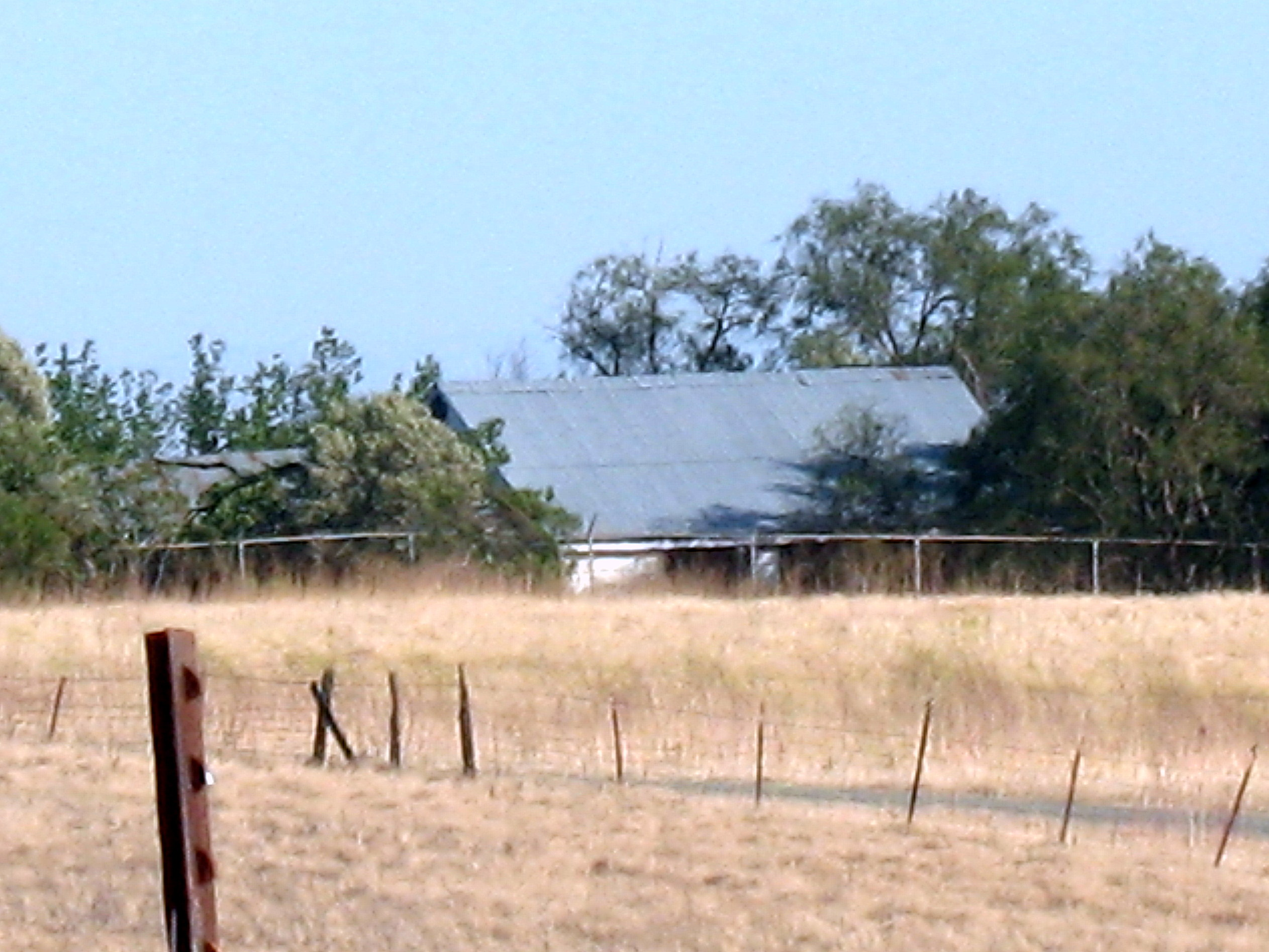

- Location within California Location within the United States
- Location: Near Collinsville, California
- Coordinates: 38°4′36″N 121°49′50″W
- Area: less than one acre
- NRHP reference No.: 72000260
- Added to NRHP: June 13, 1972

The Hastings Adobe near Collinsville, California is a ranch dwelling made of adobe that was listed on the National Register of Historic Places in 1972. It is currently on private property, in a state of disrepair and inaccessible to the public.

The structure was erected by Lansford Hastings, a lawyer and the author of The Emigrant's Guide to Oregon and California; Hastings' book promoted the Hastings Cutoff, which was a major factor in the Donner Party disaster.

It is located about 1.5 miles (2.4 km) northeast of Collinsville on the south side of County Road 493.
