= Lansford Hastings =

American explorer (1819–1870)

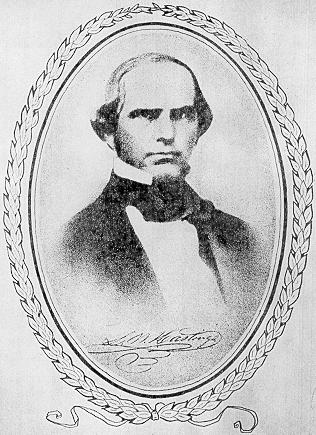
- Born: Lansford Warren Hastings; 1819; Mount Vernon, Ohio
- Died: 1870 (aged 51); St. Thomas, Virgin Islands
- Occupation(s): lawyer, writer and adventurer
- Known for: developer of the Hastings Cutoff
- Spouse: Charlotte Toler

Lansford Warren Hastings (1819–1870) was an American explorer and Confederate soldier. He is best remembered as the developer of Hastings Cutoff, a claimed shortcut to California across what is now the state of Utah, a factor in the ill-fated Donner Party of 1846. He was a Major in the Confederate States Army during the American Civil War.

== Early life ==
Born to Dr. Waitstill and Lucinda (Wood) Hastings in Mount Vernon, Ohio, he was a descendant of Thomas Hastings who came from East Anglia in England to the Massachusetts Bay Colony in 1634. Hastings was trained as a lawyer. In 1842, he traveled overland to Oregon. While there, he briefly represented Dr. John McLoughlin, preparing his land claim near Willamette Falls and surveying Oregon City, Oregon (which would become the first incorporated city west of the Rocky Mountains). He left in the spring of 1843 for Alta California, a sparsely populated province of Mexico. By the time he returned to the United States in 1844, he had decided to help to wrest California from Mexico and establish an independent Republic of California, with himself holding high office.

== The Republic of California ==
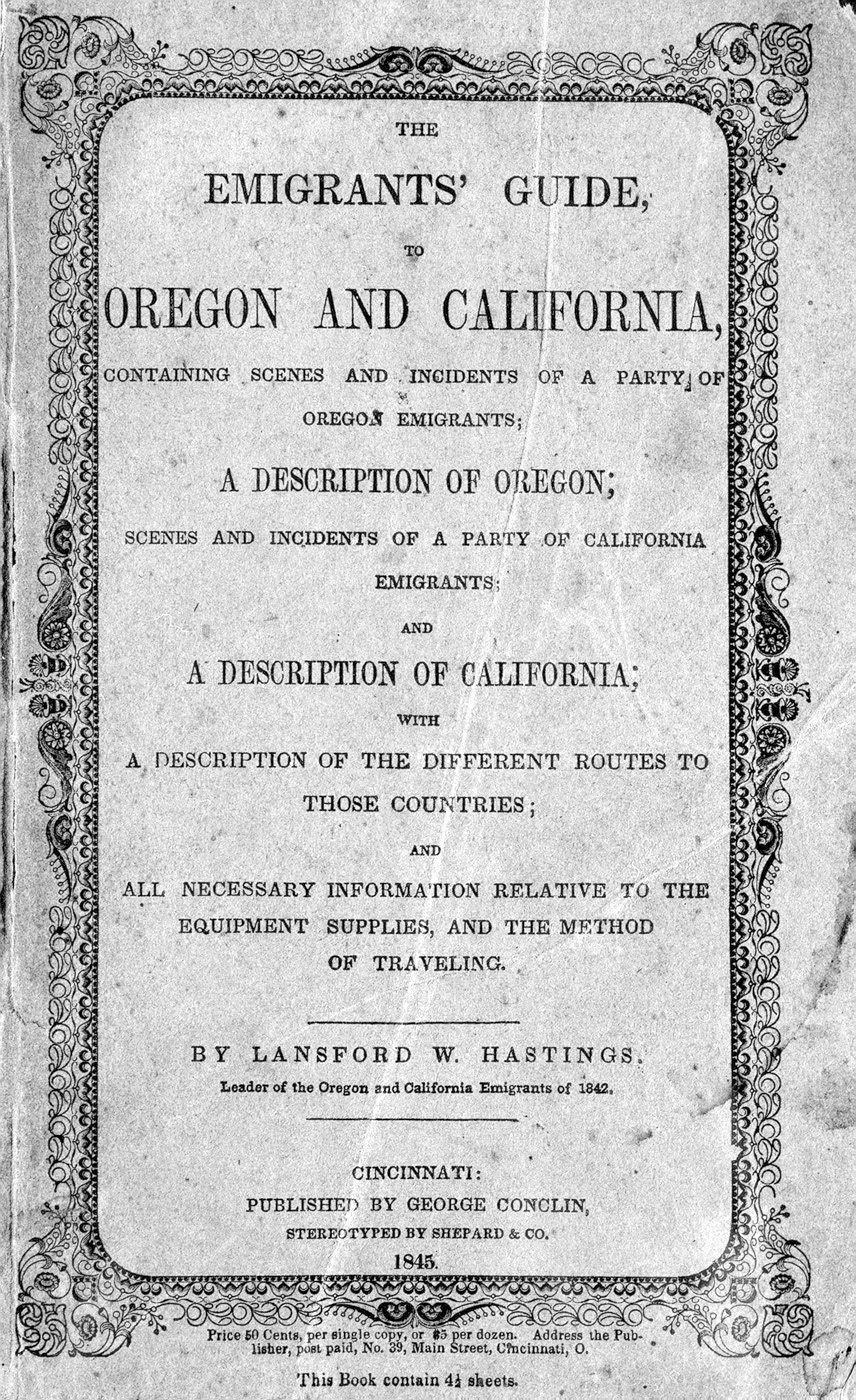
Title page, The Emigrants' Guide to Oregon and California, written by Lansford Hastings, and published in 1845

Hastings wrote The Emigrants' Guide to Oregon and California to induce Americans to move to California, hoping they could effect a bloodless revolution by sheer numbers. He described California in glowing terms and gave practical advice to overland travelers. In his book he wrote: "The most direct path would be leave the Oregon route, about two hundred miles east of Fort Hall; thence bearing west-south west, to the Salt Lake; and thence continuing down to the bay of San Francisco." (Hastings, pp. 137–138). Hastings wrote this statement before he had traveled the route himself, and he was unaware of the difficulties in crossing the Wasatch Range and the salt flats of western Utah. His first attempt was only from Fort Bridger to Salt Lake City, which he did in mild weather, without time constraints, and without ever attempting to cross the desert portion. Afterward, he eagerly spread the word that his overland route was faster and better than any other. According to historian Thomas F. Andrews, "It was Hastings’s renown as an author and trail leader, coupled with his presence on the trail…that helped persuade the [Donner] emigrants to undertake the cutoff that now bears his name." Hastings's dream of empire soon collapsed when California was conquered by the United States during the Mexican–American War. In 1848, Mexico ceded California to the United States under the Treaty of Guadalupe Hidalgo.

A home of his in California, the Hastings Adobe, is listed on the National Register of Historic Places.

== Later years ==
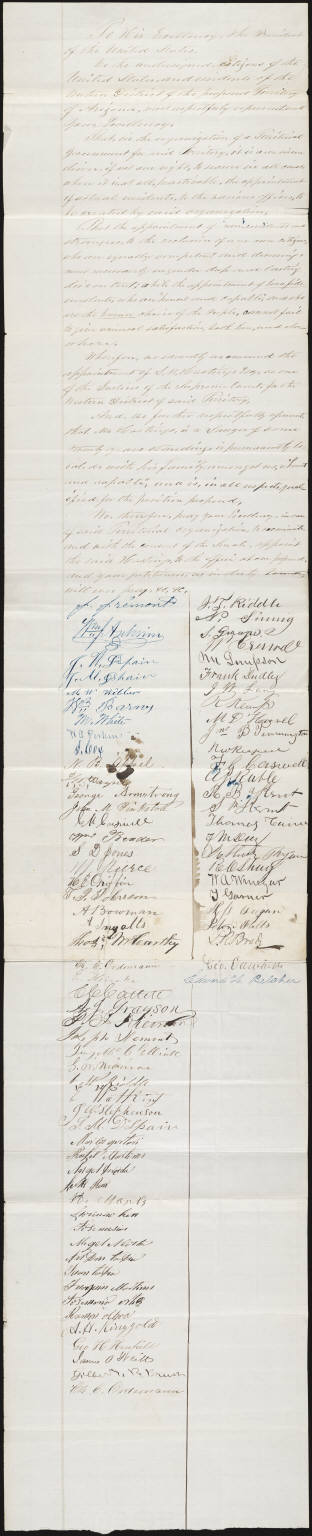
Petition to President Abraham Lincoln by citizens of Arizona, as well as John C. Frémont, seeking an appointment for Lansford Hastings. Ca. 1863.

After serving as a captain in the California Battalion during the Mexican War, Hastings again took up the practice of law. He married Charlotte Toler in 1848 and was a delegate to the 1849 California Constitutional Convention. In the late 1850s he moved his family to Yuma, Arizona, where he served as postmaster and as a territorial judge. During the Civil War, Hastings sided with the South. In 1864, he travelled to Richmond, Virginia, where he met with Confederate President Jefferson Davis to gain his support for a plan to separate California from the Union and unite it with the Confederacy. Upon meeting him, President Davis promoted Hastings to the rank of Major in the Confederate States Army, and asked him to assemble a military unit in Arizona, with the aim of defending California. However, the so-called Hastings Plot came to little, as the war ended early the following year.

After the end of the war, many disgruntled former Confederates left the United States to establish colonies in Brazil. Hastings visited the region, made arrangements with the Brazilian government, and wrote The Emigrant's Guide to Brazil (1867) to attract potential colonists. He died at St. Thomas in the Virgin Islands in 1870, possibly of yellow fever, while conducting a shipload of settlers to his colony at Santarém.
