= Alcove Springs =

Spring in Kansas, U.S.

- Alcove Spring
- U.S. National Register of Historic Places
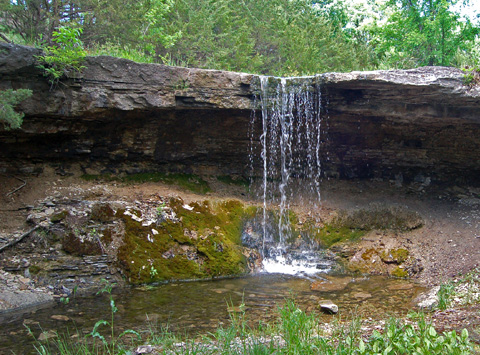

- Location within Kansas Location within the United States
- Nearest city: Blue Rapids, Kansas
- Coordinates: 39°44′57″N 96°40′33″W
- Area: 714 acres (289 ha)
- NRHP reference No.: 72000513
- Added to NRHP: February 23, 1972

Alcove Spring was a popular stop along the Oregon Trail near Independence Crossing in Marshall County, Kansas. Travelers along the trail gave the springs its name. The words "Alcove Spring," carved into the hard limestone cliff by the Donner Party, can still be seen, although some of the carving has weathered away. It is located about four miles north of Blue Rapids, along the Big Blue River.

Across the road from the Alcove Spring park is another park commemorating the Oregon Trail and features history, wagon swales and a D.A.R. marker memorializing Sarah Keyes, a member of the Donner Party who died in 1846. The exact location of her burial is unknown.

Alcove Spring was listed on the National Register of Historic Places in 1972.
