= Donner Party =

19th-century group of American pioneers

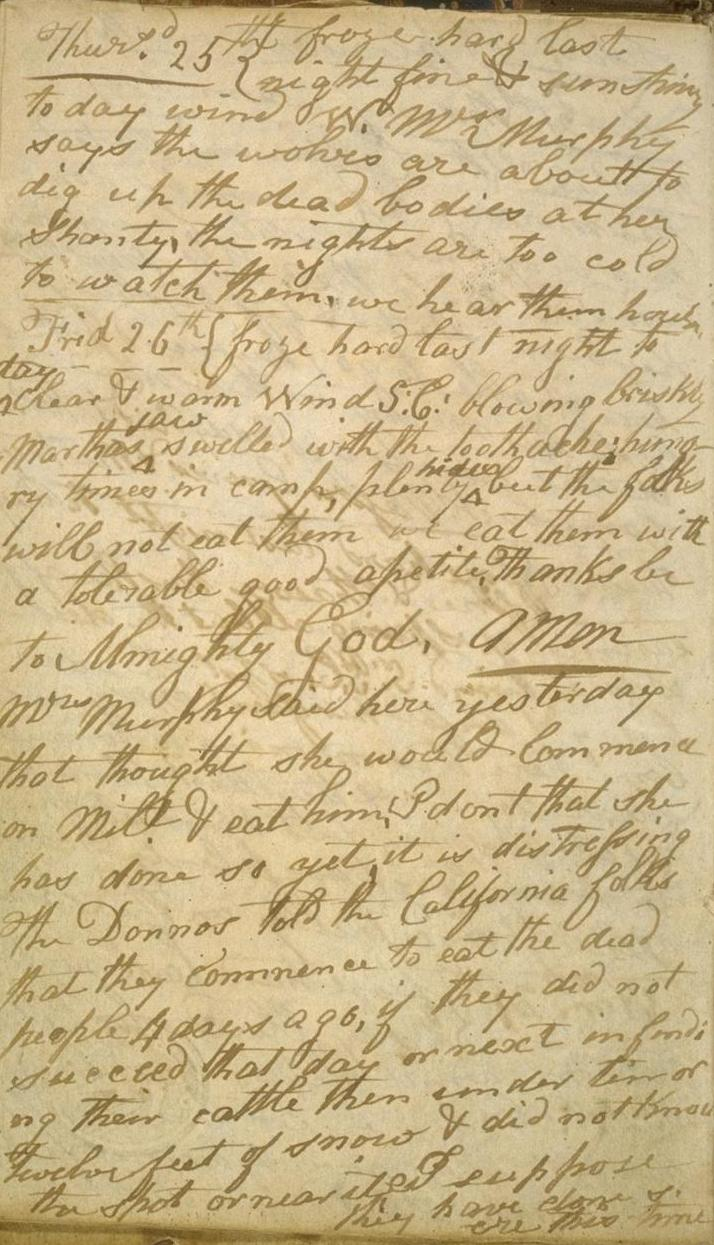
The 28th page of Patrick Breen's diary, recording his observations in late February 1847, including "Mrs Murphy said here yesterday that thought she would Commence on Milt & eat him. I dont that she has done so yet, it is distressing." [sic]

The Donner Party, sometimes called the Donner–Reed Party, was a group of American pioneers who migrated to California in a wagon train from the Midwest. Delayed by a multitude of mishaps, they spent the winter of 1846–1847 snowbound in the Sierra Nevada. Some of the migrants resorted to cannibalism to survive, mainly eating the bodies of those who had succumbed to starvation, sickness, or extreme cold, but in one case murdering and eating two Miwok guides.

The Donner Party originated from Springfield, Illinois, and departed Independence, Missouri, on the Oregon Trail in the spring of 1846. The journey west usually took between four and six months, but the Donner Party was slowed after electing to follow a new route called the Hastings Cutoff, which bypassed established trails and instead crossed the Rocky Mountains' Wasatch Range and the Great Salt Lake Desert in present-day Utah. The desolate and rugged terrain, and the difficulties they later encountered while traveling along the Humboldt River in present-day Nevada, resulted in the loss of many cattle and wagons, and divisions soon formed within the group.

By early November, the migrants had reached the Sierra Nevada but became trapped by an early, heavy snowfall near Truckee Lake (now Donner Lake) high in the mountains. Their food supplies ran dangerously low, and in mid-December some of the group set out on foot to obtain help. Rescuers from California attempted to reach the migrants, but the first relief party did not arrive until the middle of February 1847, almost four months after the wagon train became trapped. Of the 87 members of the party, 48 survived. Historians have described the episode as one of the most fascinating tragedies in California history and in the record of American westward migration.

== Background ==
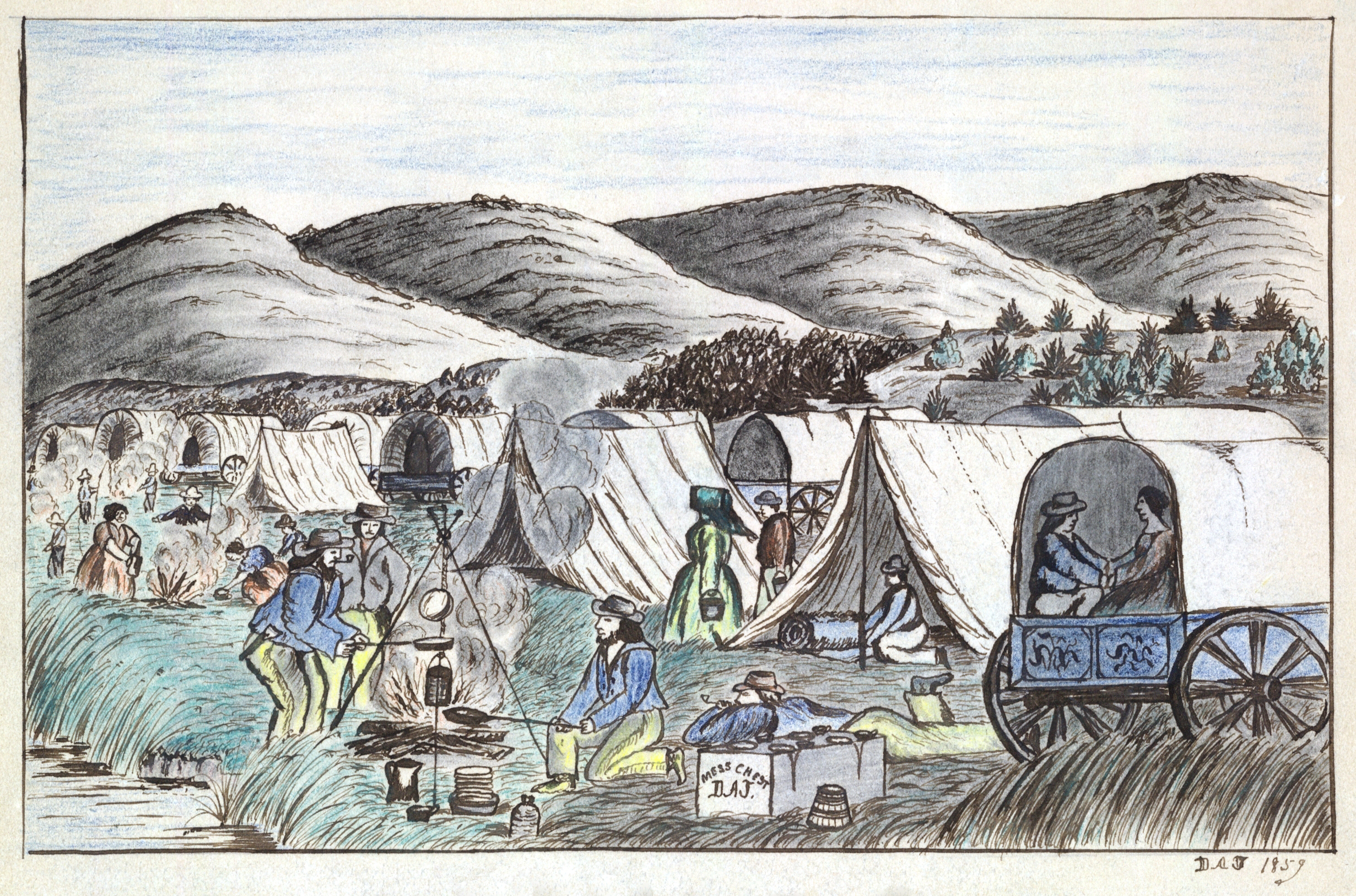
An encampment of tents and covered wagons on the Humboldt River in Nevada, 1859

During the 1840s there was a dramatic increase in settlers leaving the east to resettle in the Oregon Territory or California, which at the time were accessible only by a very long sea voyage or a daunting overland journey. Some, such as Patrick Breen, saw California, then a part of Mexico, as a place where they would be free to live in a fully Catholic culture; others were attracted to the West's burgeoning economic opportunities or inspired by manifest destiny, the belief that the land between the Atlantic and Pacific Oceans belonged to European Americans and that they should settle it. Most wagon trains followed the Oregon Trail route from a starting point in Independence, Missouri, to the Continental Divide, traveling about 15 miles (24 km) a day on a journey that usually took between four and six months. The trail generally followed rivers to South Pass, a mountain pass in present-day Wyoming which was relatively easy for wagons to negotiate. From there, pioneers had a choice of routes to their destinations.

Lansford Hastings, an early migrant from Ohio to the West, published The Emigrants' Guide to Oregon and California to encourage settlers. As an alternative to the Oregon Trail's standard route through Idaho's Snake River Plain, he proposed a more direct route (which actually increased the trip's mileage by 125 miles) to California across the Great Basin, which would take travelers through the Wasatch Range and across the Great Salt Lake Desert. Hastings had not traveled any part of his proposed shortcut until early 1846 on a trip from California to Fort Bridger, a scant supply station run by Jim Bridger at Blacks Fork, Wyoming. Hastings stayed at the fort to persuade travelers to turn south on his route. As of 1846, Hastings was the second person documented to have crossed the southern part of the Great Salt Lake Desert, but neither had been accompanied by wagons. (Note: There are no written records of native tribes having crossed the desert, nor did the migrants mention any existing trails in this region. (Rarick, p. 69))

Arguably the most difficult part of the journey to California was the last 100 miles (160 km) across the Sierra Nevada. This mountain range has 500 distinct peaks over 12,000 feet (3,700 m) high, and because of its height and proximity to the Pacific Ocean, the range receives more snow than most other ranges in North America. The eastern side of the range, the Sierra Escarpment, is notoriously steep. After a wagon train left Missouri for Oregon or California, timing was crucial to ensure that it would not be bogged down by mud created by spring rains or by massive snowdrifts in the mountains from September onward, and that horses and oxen had enough spring grass to eat.

== Families ==
In the spring of 1846, almost 500 wagons headed west from Independence. At the rear of the train, a group of nine wagons carrying the Reed and Donner families and their employees left the town on May 12. George Donner was about 60 years old and living near Springfield, Illinois. With him were his 44-year-old wife Tamsen, their three daughters Frances (6), Georgia (4), and Eliza (3), and George's daughters from a previous marriage: Elitha (14) and Leanna (12). George's younger brother Jacob (56) joined the party with his wife Elizabeth (45), stepsons Solomon Hook (14) and William Hook (12), and five children: George (9), Mary (7), Isaac (6), Lewis (4), and Samuel (1). Also traveling with the Donner brothers were teamsters Hiram O. Miller (29), Samuel Shoemaker (25), Noah James (16), Charles Burger (30), John Denton (28), and Augustus Spitzer (30).

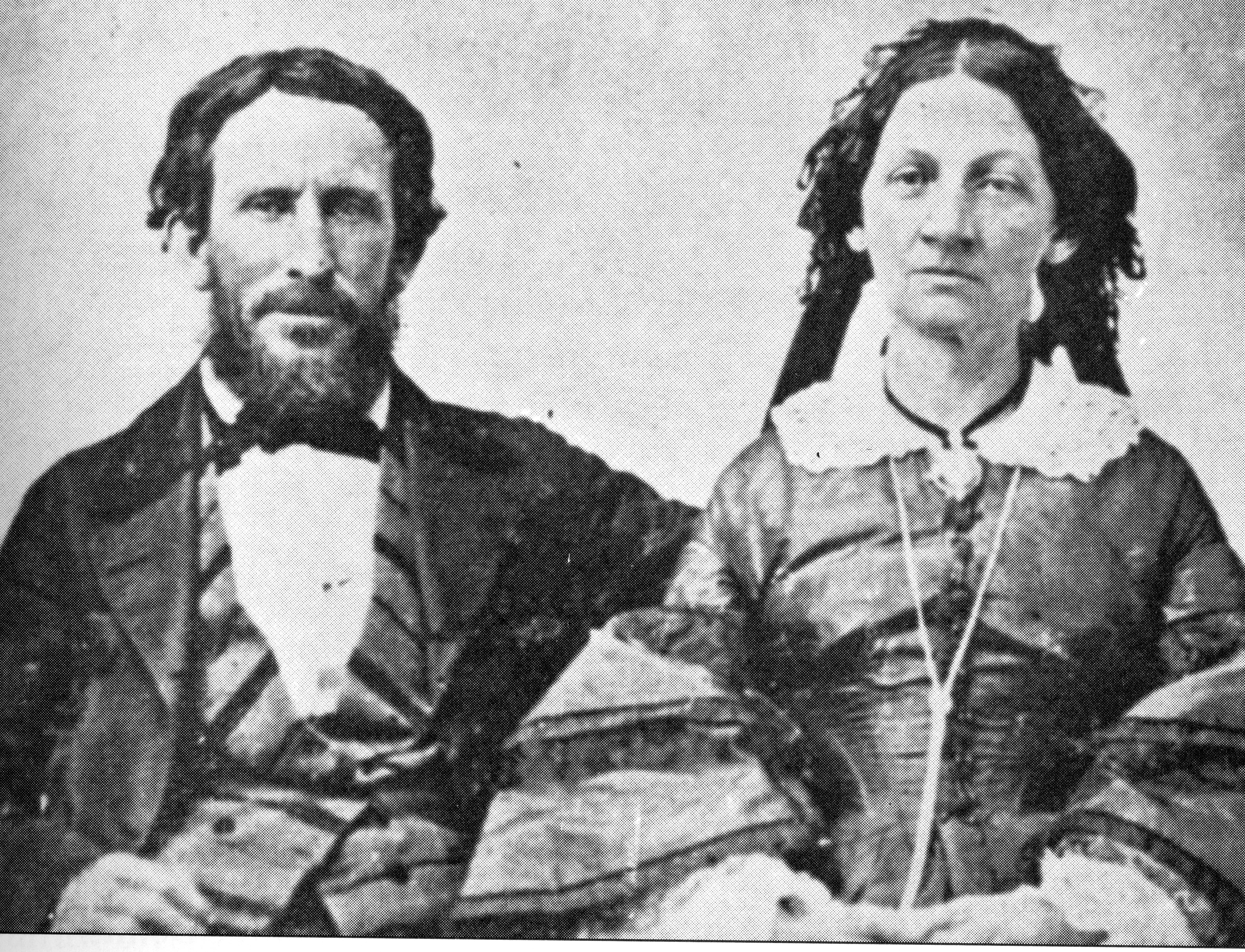
James and Margret Reed

James F. Reed (45) was accompanied on the journey by his wife Margret (32), stepdaughter Virginia (13), daughter Martha Jane ("Patty", 8), sons James and Thomas (5 and 3), and Sarah Keyes, Margret's mother. Keyes was in the advanced stages of tuberculosis and died at a campsite they named Alcove Springs. She was buried nearby, off to the side of the trail, with a gray rock inscribed, "Mrs. Sarah Keyes, Died May 29, 1846; Aged 70". In addition to leaving financial worries behind, Reed hoped that California's climate would help Margret, who had long suffered from ill health. The Reeds hired three men to drive the ox teams: Milford ("Milt") Elliott (28), James Smith (25), and Walter Herron (25). Baylis Williams (24) went along as handyman and his sister, Eliza (25), as the family's cook.

Within a week of leaving Independence, the Reeds and Donners joined a group of 50 wagons nominally led by William H. Russell. By June 16, the company had traveled 450 miles (720 km), with 200 miles (320 km) to go before Fort Laramie. They had been delayed by rain and a rising river, but Tamsen Donner wrote to a friend in Springfield, "indeed, if I do not experience something far worse than I have yet done, I shall say the trouble is all in getting started". (Note: Tamsen Donner's letters were printed in the Springfield Journal in 1846. (McGlashan, p. 24)) Virginia Reed, a young teenager during the journey, recalled years later that, during the first part of the trip, she was "perfectly happy".

Several other families joined the wagon train along the way. Levinah Murphy (37), a widow from Tennessee, headed a family of thirteen. Her five youngest children were: John Landrum (16), Meriam ("Mary", 14), Lemuel (12), William (10), and Simon (8). Levinah's two married daughters and their families also came along: Sarah Murphy Foster (19), her husband William M. (30), and son Jeremiah George (1); Harriet Murphy Pike (18), her husband William M. (32), and their daughters Naomi (3) and Catherine (1). William H. Eddy (28), a carriage maker from Illinois, brought his wife Eleanor (25) and their two children, James (3) and Margaret (1). The Breen family consisted of Patrick Breen (51), a farmer from Iowa, his wife Margaret ("Peggy", 40), and seven children: John (14), Edward (13), Patrick, Jr. (9), Simon (8), James (5), Peter (3), and 11-month-old Isabella. Their neighbor, 40-year-old bachelor Patrick Dolan, traveled with them. German immigrant Lewis Keseberg (32) joined, along with his wife Elisabeth Philippine (22) and daughter Ada (2); son Lewis Jr. was born on the trail. Two young single men named Spitzer and Reinhardt traveled with another German couple, the Wolfingers, who were rumored to be wealthy; they also had a hired driver, "Dutch Charley" Burger. An older man named Hardkoop rode with them. Luke Halloran, a young man with tuberculosis, could no longer ride horseback; the families he had been traveling with no longer had resources to care for him. He was taken in by George Donner at Little Sandy River and rode in their wagon.

== Hastings Cutoff ==
To promote his new route (the "Hastings Cutoff"), Lansford Hastings sent riders to deliver letters to traveling migrants. On July 12, the Reeds and Donners were given one. Hastings warned the migrants they could expect opposition from the Mexican authorities in California and advised them to band together in large groups. He also claimed to have "worked out a new and better road to California" and said he would be waiting at Fort Bridger to guide the migrants along the new cutoff.

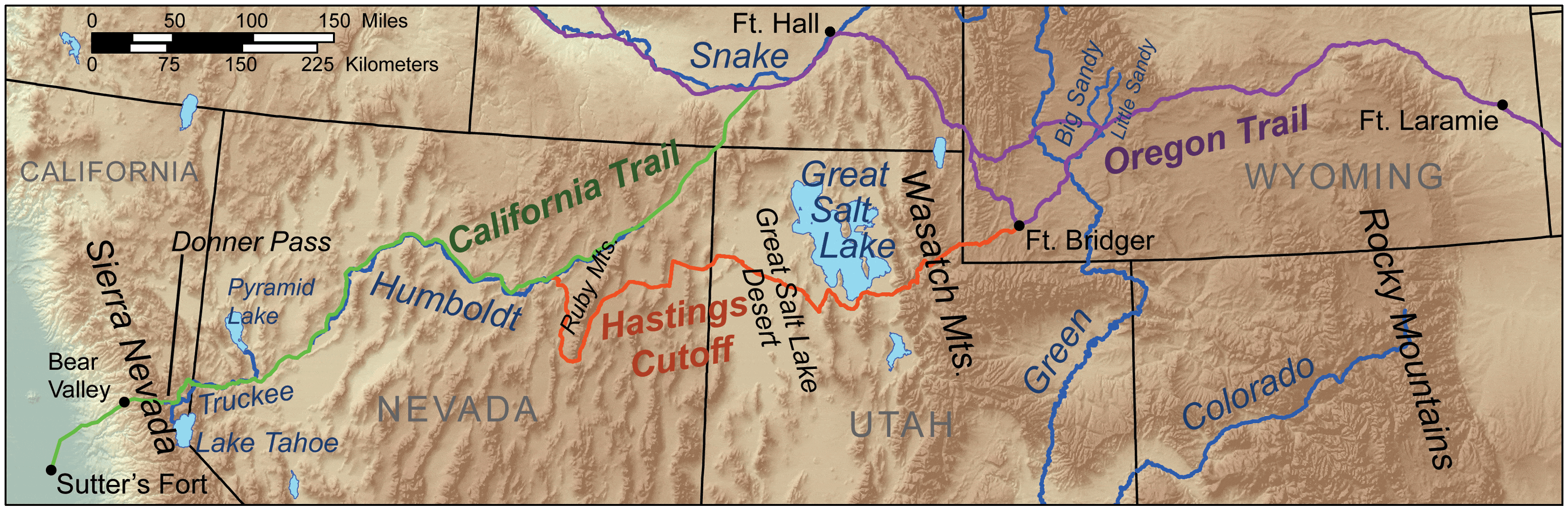
Route taken by the Donner Party, showing the Hastings Cutoff—which added 150 miles (240 km) to their travels—in orange

On July 20, at the Little Sandy River, most of the wagon train opted to follow the established trail via Fort Hall. A smaller group opted to head for Fort Bridger and needed a leader. James Reed had military experience, but his autocratic attitude had rubbed many in the party the wrong way: they saw him as aristocratic, imperious and ostentatious. By comparison, the mature, experienced Donner's peaceful and charitable nature made him the group's first choice. While the members of the party were comfortably well-off by contemporary standards, most of them were inexperienced in long, difficult, overland travel. Additionally, the members of the party had little knowledge about how to interact with Native Americans.

Journalist Edwin Bryant reached Blacks Fork a week ahead of the Donner Party. He saw the first part of the trail and was concerned that it would be difficult for the wagons in the Donner group, especially with so many women and children. He returned to Blacks Fork to leave letters warning several members of the group not to take Hastings's shortcut. By the time the Donner Party reached Blacks Fork on July 27, Hastings had already left, leading the forty wagons of the Harlan–Young group. Because Jim Bridger's trading post would fare substantially better if people used the Hastings Cutoff, Bridger told the party that the shortcut was a smooth trip, devoid of rugged country and hostile Native Americans, and would shorten their journey by 350 miles (560 km). Water would be easy to find along the way, although a couple of days crossing a 30–40-mile (48–64 km) dry lake bed would be necessary.

Reed was very impressed with this information and advocated for the Hastings Cutoff. None of the party received Bryant's letters; in his diary account, Bryant states his conviction that Bridger deliberately concealed the letters, a view shared by Reed in his later testimony. At Fort Laramie, Reed met an old friend named James Clyman who was coming from California. Clyman warned Reed not to take the Hastings Cutoff, telling him that wagons would not be able to make it and that Hastings' information was inaccurate. Fellow pioneer Jesse Quinn Thornton traveled part of the way with Donner and Reed, and in his book From Oregon and California in 1848 declared Hastings the "Baron Munchausen of travelers in these countries". Tamsen Donner, according to Thornton, was "gloomy, sad, and dispirited" at the thought of turning off the main trail on the advice of Hastings, whom she considered "a selfish adventurer".

On July 31, 1846, the Donner Party left Blacks Fork after four days of rest and wagon repairs, eleven days behind the leading Harlan–Young group. Donner hired a replacement driver, and the company was joined by the McCutchen family, consisting of William (30), his wife Amanda (24), their two-year-old daughter Harriet, and a 16-year-old named Jean Baptiste Trudeau from New Mexico, who claimed to have knowledge of the Native Americans and terrain on the way to California.

=== Wasatch Range ===
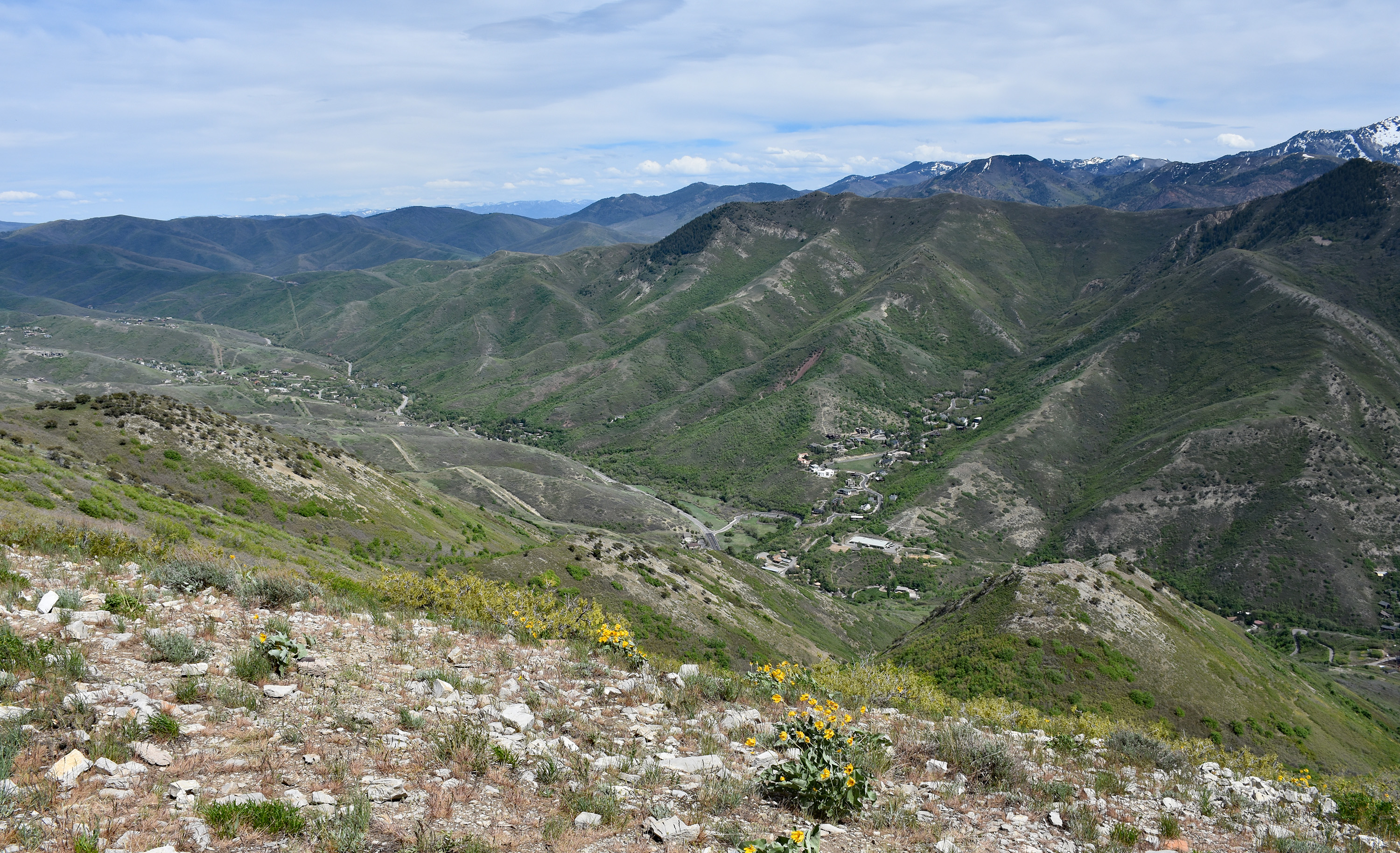
Emigration Canyon, route of the Hastings Cutoff

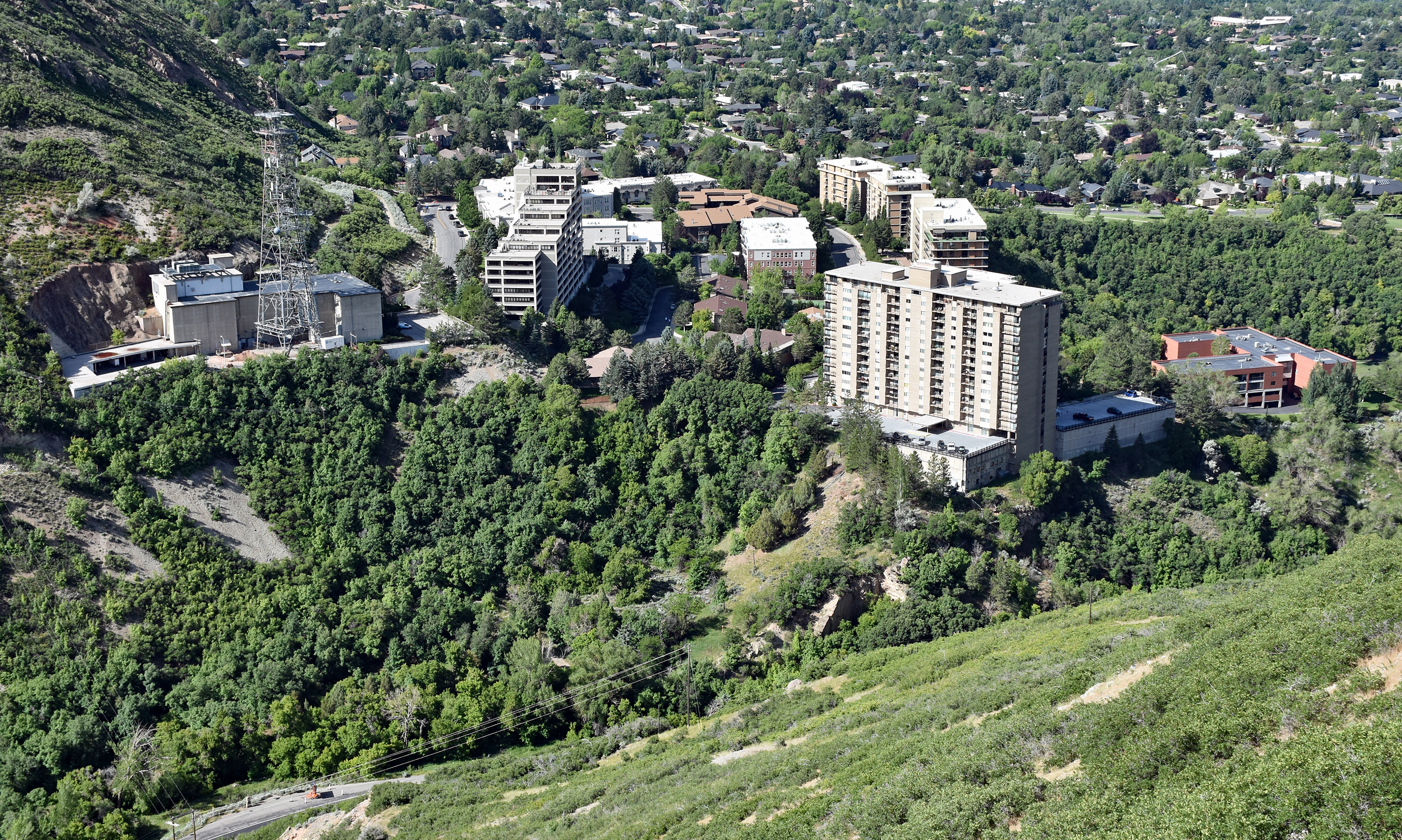
Donner Hill at the mouth of Emigration Canyon, the last obstacle in the Wasatch Range

The party turned south to follow the Hastings Cutoff. Within days, they found the terrain to be much more difficult than described. Drivers were forced to lock the wheels of their wagons to prevent them from rolling down steep inclines. Years of traffic on the main Oregon Trail had left an easy and obvious path, whereas the Cutoff was more difficult to find.

Hastings wrote directions and left letters stuck to trees. On August 6, the party found a letter from him advising them to stop until he could show them an alternate route to that taken by the Harlan–Young Party. (Note: While Hastings was otherwise occupied, his guides had led the Harlan–Young Party through Weber Canyon, which was not the route that Hastings had intended to take. (Rarick, p. 61)) Reed, Charles T. Stanton, and William Pike rode ahead to get Hastings. They encountered exceedingly difficult canyons where boulders had to be moved and walls cut off precariously to a river below, a route likely to break wagons. In his letter Hastings had offered to guide the Donner Party around the more difficult areas, but he rode back only part way, indicating the general direction to follow.

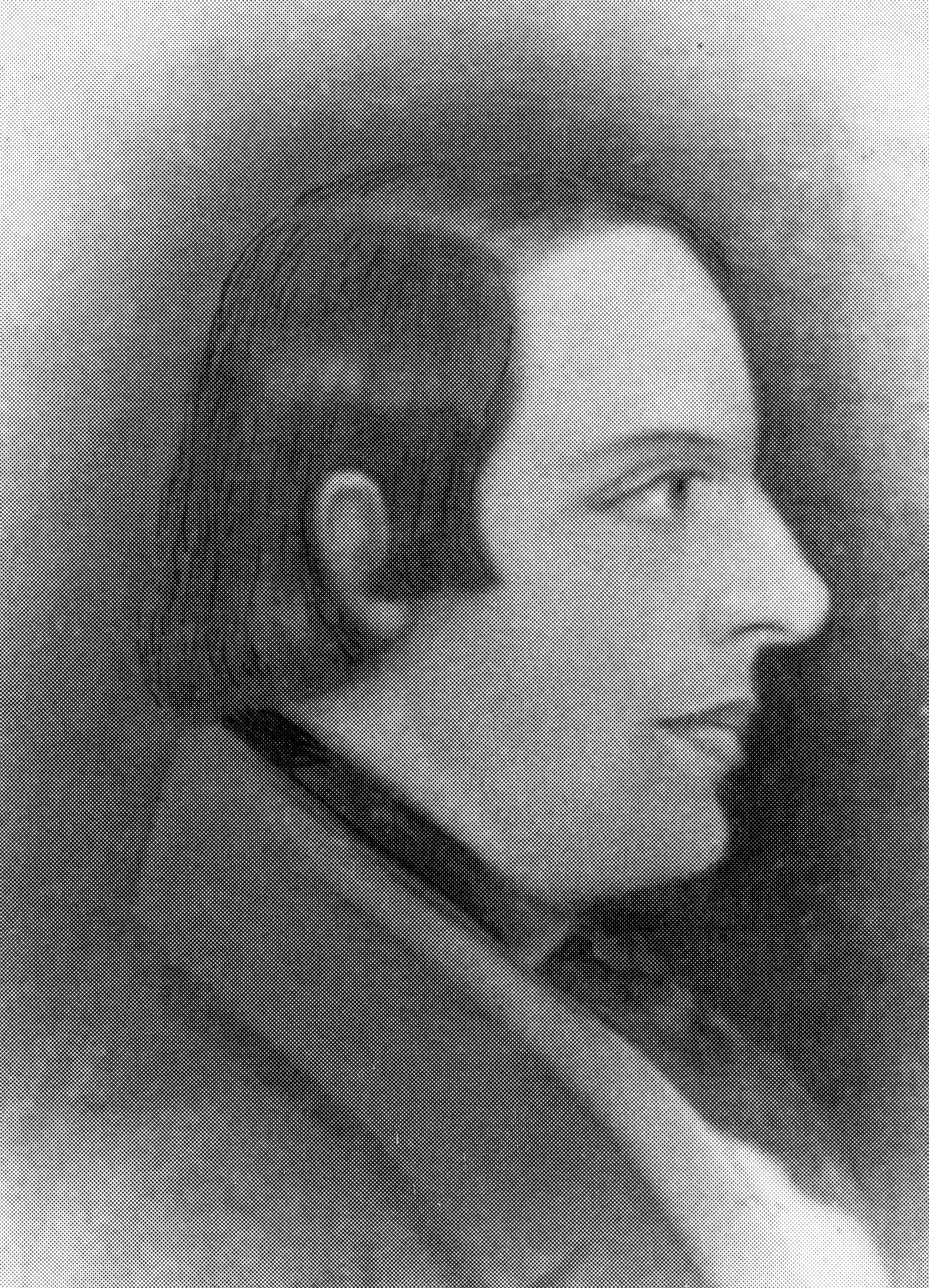
Charles Tyler Stanton

Stanton and Pike stopped to rest and Reed returned alone to the group, arriving four days after the party's departure. Without the guide they had been promised, the group had to decide whether to turn back and rejoin the traditional trail, follow the tracks left by the Harlan–Young Party through the difficult terrain of Weber Canyon, or forge their own trail in the direction that Hastings had recommended. At Reed's urging, the group chose the new Hastings route. Their progress slowed to about one and a half miles (2.4 km) a day. All able-bodied men were required to clear brush, fell trees, and heave rocks to make room for the wagons. (Note: The route that the party followed is now known as Emigration Canyon. (Johnson, p. 28))

As the Donner Party made its way across the Wasatch Range of the Rocky Mountains, the Graves family, who had set off to find them, reached them. They consisted of Franklin Ward Graves (57), his wife Elizabeth (45), their children Mary (20), William (18), Eleanor (15), Lovina (13), Nancy (9), Jonathan (7), Franklin, Jr. (5), Elizabeth (1), and married daughter Sarah (22), plus son-in-law Jay Fosdick (23) and a 25-year-old teamster named John Snyder, traveling together in three wagons. Their arrival brought the Donner Party to 87 members in 60–80 wagons. The Graves family had been part of the last group to leave Missouri, confirming the Donner Party was at the back of the year's western exodus.

It was August 20 by the time that they reached a point in the mountains where they could see the Great Salt Lake. It took almost another two weeks to travel out of the Wasatch Range. The men began arguing, and doubts were expressed about the wisdom of those who had chosen this route, in particular Reed. Food and supplies began to run out for some of the less affluent families. Stanton and Pike had ridden out with Reed but had become lost on their way back; by the time the party found them, they were a day away from eating their horses.

=== Great Salt Lake Desert ===
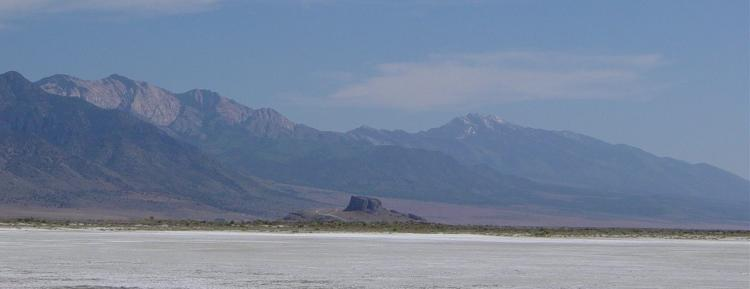
Great Salt Lake Desert

Luke Halloran died of tuberculosis on August 25. A few days later, the party came across a tattered letter from Hastings. The pieces indicated there were two days and nights of difficult travel ahead without grass or water. The party rested their oxen and prepared for the trip. After 36 hours they set off to traverse a 1,000-foot (300 m) mountain in their path. From its peak they saw ahead a dry, barren plain, perfectly flat and covered with white salt, larger than the one they had just crossed, and "one of the most inhospitable places on earth" according to Rarick. Their oxen were already fatigued, and their water was nearly gone.

The Donner Party pressed onward on August 30, having no alternative. In the heat of the day, the moisture underneath the salt crust rose to the surface and turned it into a gummy mass. The wagon wheels sank into it, in some cases up to the hubs. The days were blisteringly hot and the nights frigid. Several of the group saw visions of lakes and wagon trains and believed they had finally overtaken Hastings. After three days, the water was gone and some of the party removed their oxen from the wagons to press ahead to find more. Some of the animals were so weakened they were left yoked to the wagons and abandoned. Nine of Reed's ten oxen broke free, crazed with thirst, and bolted off into the desert. Many other families' cattle and horses went missing. The journey irreparably damaged some of the wagons, but no human lives were lost. Instead of the promised two-day journey over 40 miles (64 km), the journey across 80 miles (130 km) of the Great Salt Lake Desert took six. (Note: In 1986, a team of archaeologists attempted to cross the same stretch of desert at the same time of year in four-wheel drive trucks and were unable to do so. (Rarick, p. 71))

None of the party had any remaining faith in the Hastings Cutoff as they recovered at the springs on the other side of the desert. (Note: The location has since been named Donner Spring where the Donner Party recuperated, at the base of Pilot Peak. (Johnson, p. 31)) They spent several days trying to recover cattle, retrieve the wagons left in the desert, and transfer their food and supplies to other wagons. (Note: Reed's account states that many of the travelers lost cattle and were trying to locate them, although some of the other members thought that they were looking for his cattle. (Rarick, p. 74, Reed's own account "The Snow-Bound, Starved Emigrants of 1846 Statement by Mr. Reed, One of the Donner Company" in Johnson, p. 190)) Reed's family incurred the heaviest losses, and Reed became more assertive, asking all the families to submit an inventory of their goods and food to him. He suggested that two men should go to Sutter's Fort in California; he had heard that John Sutter was exceedingly generous to wayward pioneers and could assist them with extra provisions. Charles Stanton and William McCutchen volunteered to undertake the dangerous trip. The remaining serviceable wagons were pulled by mongrel teams of cows, oxen and mules. It was the middle of September, and two young men who went in search of missing oxen reported that another 40 miles (64 km) of desert lay ahead.

Their cattle and oxen were now exhausted and lean, but the Donner Party crossed the next stretch of desert relatively unscathed. The journey seemed to get easier, particularly through the valley next to the Ruby Mountains. Despite their near-hatred of Hastings, they had no choice but to follow his tracks, which were weeks old. On September 26, two months after embarking on the cutoff, the party rejoined the traditional trail along a stream that became known as the Humboldt River. The "shortcut" had probably delayed them by a month.

== Rejoining the trail ==
=== Reed banished ===
Along the Humboldt River, the group met Paiute Native Americans, who joined them for a couple of days but stole or shot several oxen and horses. By now, it was well into October, and the Donner families split off to make better time. Two wagons in the remaining group became tangled, and John Snyder angrily beat the ox of Reed's hired teamster Milt Elliott. When Reed intervened, Snyder rained blows onto his head with a whip handle—when Reed's wife attempted to intervene, she too was struck. Reed retaliated by fatally stabbing Snyder.

That evening, the witnesses gathered to discuss what was to be done. American laws were not applicable west of the Continental Divide (in what was then Mexican territory) and wagon trains often dispensed their own justice. But George Donner, the party's leader, was a full day ahead of the main wagon train with his family. Snyder had been seen to hit Reed, and some claimed he had also hit his wife, but Snyder had been popular and Reed was not. Keseberg suggested that Reed should be hanged, but an eventual compromise allowed Reed to leave the camp without his family, who were to be taken care of by the others. Reed departed alone the next morning, unarmed, (Note: In 1871, Reed wrote an account of the events of the Donner Party in which he omitted any reference to his killing Snyder, although his step-daughter Virginia described it in a letter home written in May 1847, which was heavily edited by Reed. In Reed's 1871 account, he left the group to check on Stanton and McCutchen. (Johnson p. 191.)) but his stepdaughter Virginia rode ahead and secretly provided him with a rifle and food.

=== Disintegration ===
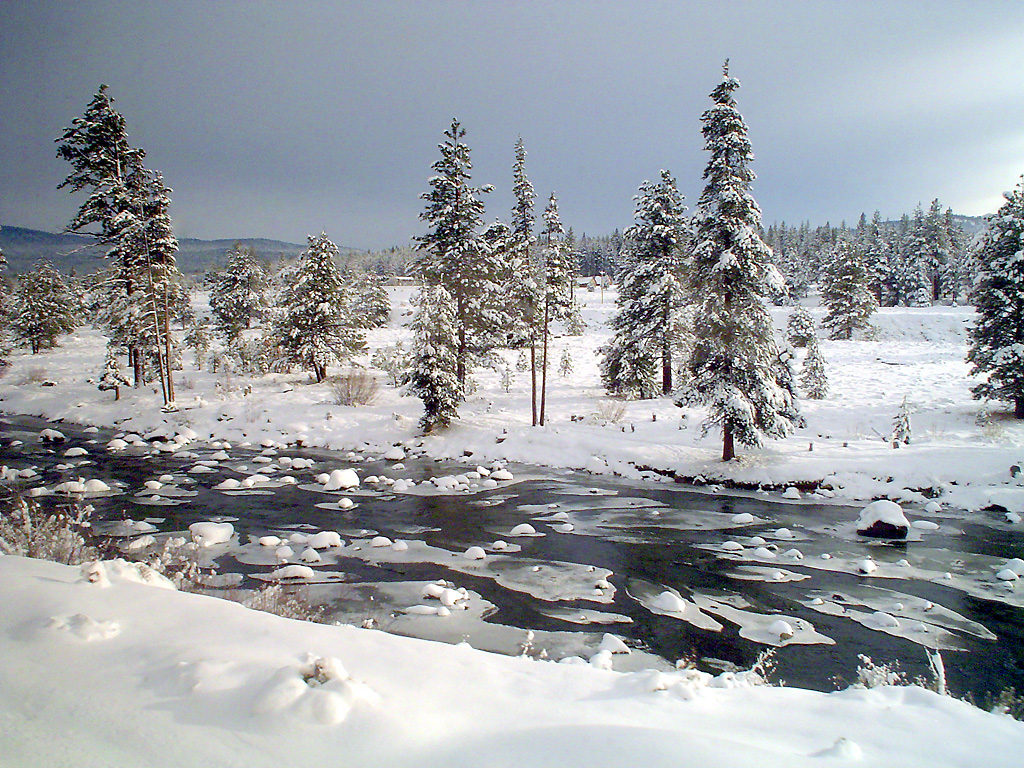
The Truckee River in winter

The trials that the Donner Party had so far endured resulted in splintered groups, each looking out for themselves and distrustful of the others. Grass was becoming scarce, and the animals were steadily weakening. To relieve the animals' load, everyone was expected to walk. Keseberg ejected Hardkoop from his wagon, telling the elderly man that he had to walk or die. A few days later, Hardkoop sat next to a stream, his feet so swollen they had split open; he was not seen again. William Eddy pleaded with the others to find him, but they all refused, swearing they would waste no more resources on a man almost 70 years old.

Meanwhile, Reed caught up with the Donners and proceeded with one of his teamsters, Walter Herron. The two shared a horse and were able to cover 25–40 miles (40–64 km) per day. The rest of the party rejoined the Donners, but their hardship continued. Native Americans chased away all of Graves' horses, and another wagon was left behind. With grass in short supply, the cattle spread out more, which allowed the Paiutes to steal 18 more during one evening; several mornings later, they shot another 21. So far, the company had lost nearly 100 oxen and cattle, and their rations were almost completely depleted. With nearly all his cattle gone, Wolfinger stopped at the Humboldt Sink to cache (bury) his wagon; Reinhardt and Spitzer stayed behind to help. They returned without him, reporting they had been attacked by Paiutes and he had been killed. One more stretch of desert lay ahead. The Eddys' oxen had been killed by Native Americans and they were forced to abandon their wagon. The family had eaten all their stores, but the other families refused to assist their children. The Eddys were forced to walk, carrying their children and miserable with thirst. Margret Reed and her children were also now without a wagon. But the desert soon came to an end, and the party found the Truckee River in beautiful lush country.

The company had little time to rest. They pressed on to cross the Sierra Nevada before the snows came. Stanton, one of the two men who had left a month earlier to seek assistance in California, found the company; he brought mules and food from Sutter's Fort, and two Native American guides employed by John Sutter. These Miwok men from the Cosumnes River area were known by their Catholic baptismal names, Luis and Salvador. (Note: The branch of Miwoks from the California plains region were the Cosumne, between where Stockton and Sacramento are located. Luis and Salvador, both Cosumne, were Catholic converts employed by Sutter. Historian Joseph King deduced that Luis' given Miwok name was Eema. He was probably 19 years old in 1846. Salvador's given name was probably QuéYuen, and he would have been 28 years old the same year. (King, Joseph A. [1994]. "Lewis and Salvador: Unsung Heroes of the Donner Party", The Californians, Vol. 13, No. 2, pp. 20–21.)) Stanton also brought news that Reed and Herron, although haggard and starving, had reached Sutter's Fort. By this point, according to Rarick, "To the bedraggled, half-starved members of the Donner Party, it must have seemed that the worst of their problems had passed."

== Snowbound ==
=== Donner Pass ===
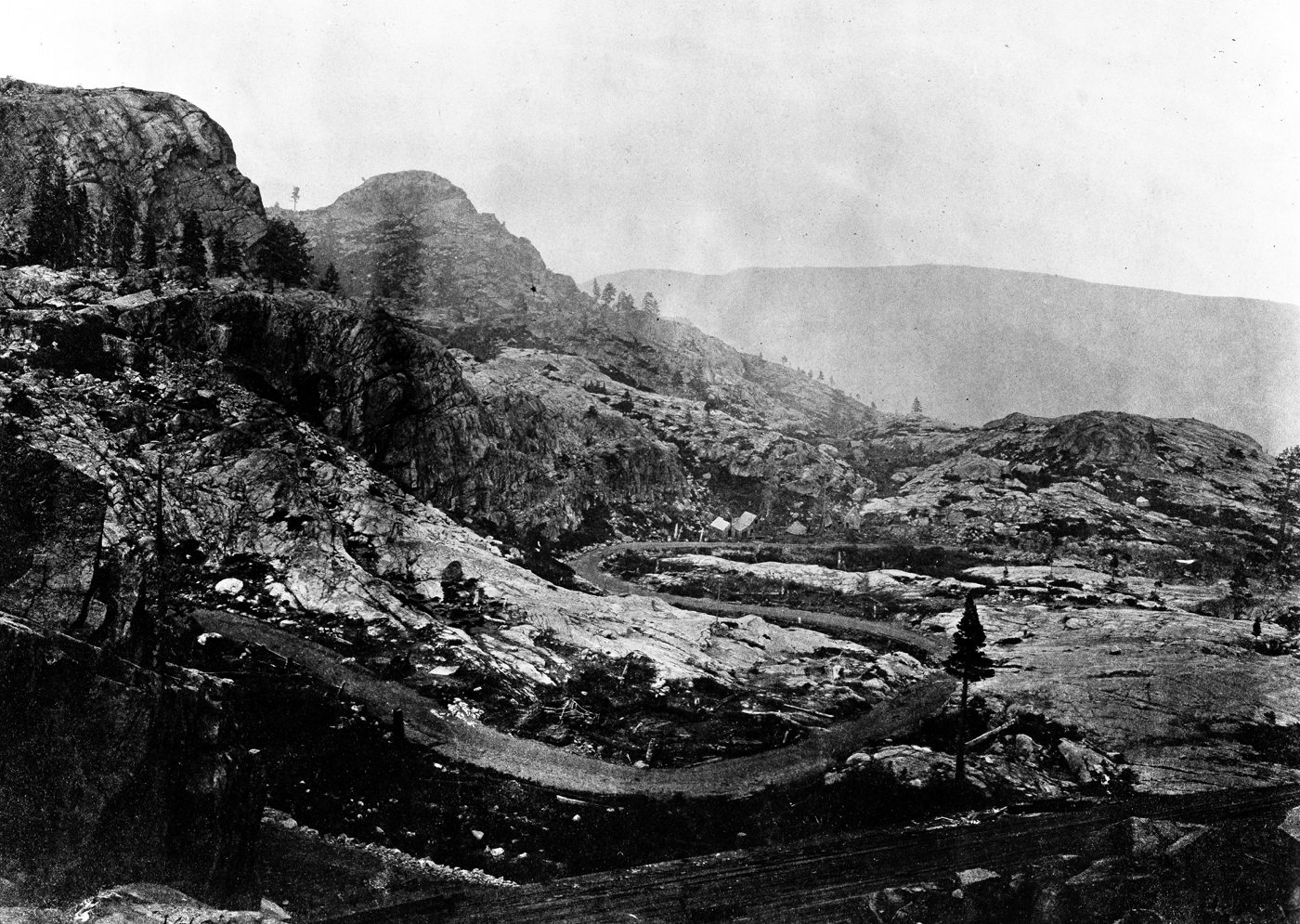
The 7,088-foot (2,160 m) high pass above Truckee Lake became blocked by early snow in November 1846 (here photographed in the 1870s). Both the pass and the lake are now named after the Donner Party.

Faced with one last push over mountains that were described as much worse than the Wasatch Range, the Donner Party had to decide whether to forge ahead or rest their cattle. It was October 20 and they had heard from Sutter's Fort, via Stanton, that the pass (now known as Donner Pass) would not be snowed in until the middle of November. William Pike was killed when a gun being loaded by William Foster was discharged negligently, an event that seemed to make the decision for them; family by family, they resumed their journey—first the Breens, then the Kesebergs, Stanton with the Reeds, Graves, and the Murphys. The Donners traveled last. After a few miles of rough terrain, an axle broke on one of their wagons. Jacob and George went into the woods to fashion a replacement. George Donner sliced his hand open while chiseling the wood but it seemed a superficial wound.

Snow began to fall. The Breens made it up the "massive, nearly vertical slope" 1,000 feet (300 m) to Truckee Lake (now known as Donner Lake), 3 miles (4.8 km) from the pass summit, and camped near a cabin that had been built two years earlier by members of the Stephens–Townsend–Murphy Party. (Note: The cabins were built by three members of another group of migrants known as the Stevens Party, specifically by Joseph Foster, Allen Stevens and Moses Schallenberger, in November 1844. (Hardesty, pp. 49–50) Virginia Reed later married a member of this party named John Murphy, unrelated to the Murphy family associated with the Donner Party. (Johnson, p. 262)) The Eddys and the Kesebergs joined the Breens, attempting to make it over the pass, but they found 5–10-foot (1.5–3.0 m) snowdrifts and were unable to find the trail. They turned back for Truckee Lake and within a day all the families were camped there except for the Donners, who were 5 miles (8.0 km)—half a day's journey—below them.

=== Winter camp ===
Truckee Lake and Alder Creek sites

Sixty members and associates of the Breen, Graves, Reed, Murphy, Keseberg and Eddy families set up for the winter at Truckee Lake. Three widely separated cabins of pine logs served as their homes, with dirt floors and poorly constructed flat roofs that leaked when it rained. The Breens occupied one cabin, the Eddys and the Murphys another, and the Reeds and the Graveses the third. Keseberg built a lean-to for his family against the side of the Breen cabin. The families used canvas or oxhide to patch the faulty roofs. The cabins had no windows or doors, only large holes to allow entry. Of the 60 at Truckee Lake, 19 were men over age 18, 12 were women, and 29 were children, six of whom were toddlers or younger. Farther down the trail, close to Alder Creek, the Donner families hastily constructed tents to house 21 people, including Mrs. Wolfinger and the Donners' drivers: six men, three women and twelve children in all. It began to snow again on the evening of November 4—the beginning of an eight-day storm.

By the time the party made camp, very little food remained from the supplies that Stanton had brought back from Sutter's Fort. The oxen began to die, and their carcasses were frozen and stacked. Truckee Lake was not yet frozen, but the pioneers were unfamiliar with catching lake trout. Eddy, the most experienced hunter, killed a bear, but had little luck after that. The Reed and Eddy families had lost almost everything. Margret Reed promised to pay double when they got to California for the use of three oxen from the Graves and Breen families. Graves charged Eddy $25—normally the cost of two healthy oxen—for the carcass of an ox that had starved to death.

Desperation grew in camp and some reasoned that individuals might succeed in navigating the pass where the wagons could not. In small groups they made several attempts, but each time returned defeated. Another severe storm, lasting more than a week, covered the area so deeply that the cattle and horses—their only remaining food—died and were lost in the snow. Patrick Breen began keeping a diary on November 20. He concerned himself primarily with the weather, marking the storms and how much snow had fallen, but gradually began to include religious references in his entries.

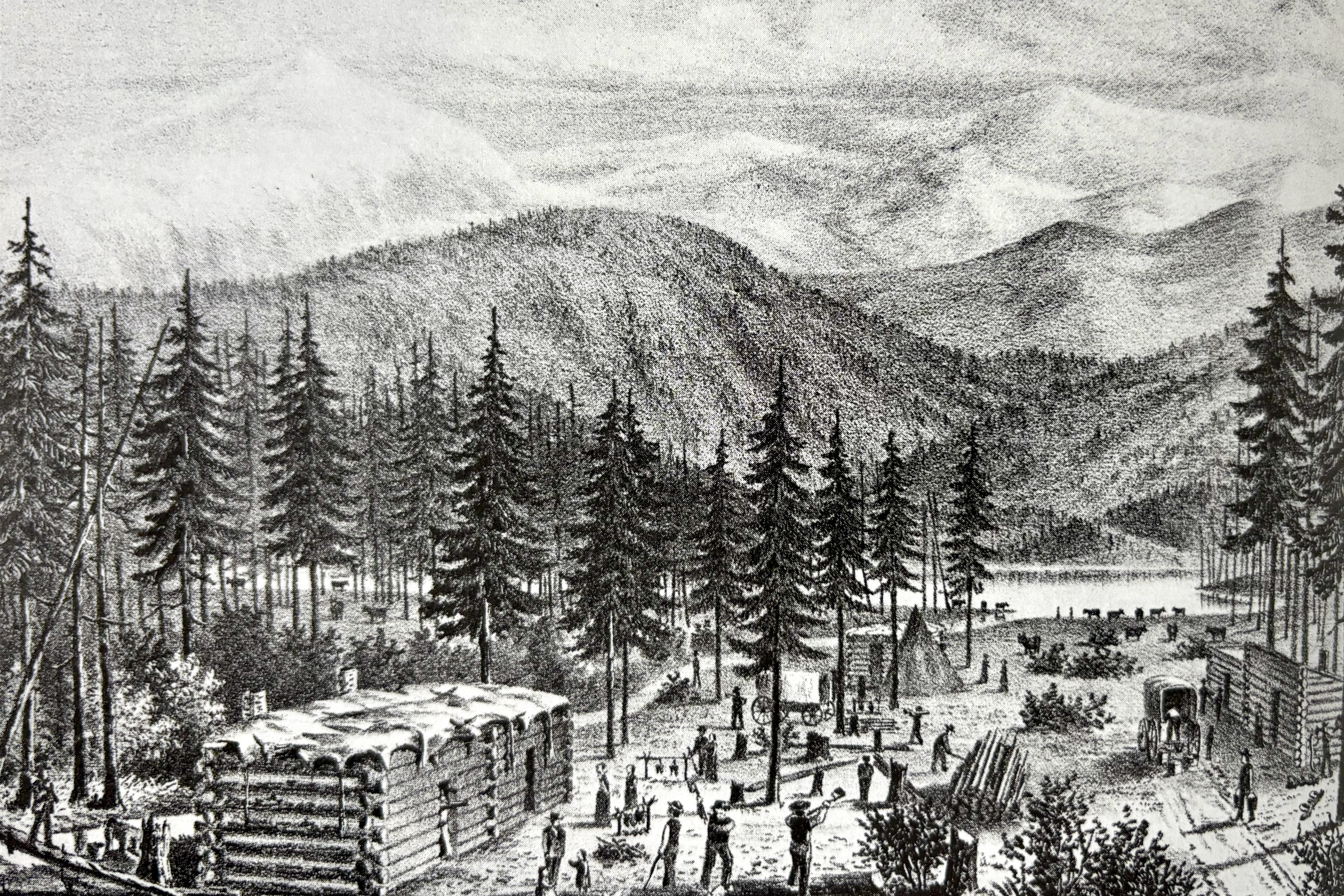
Artist's rendering of the Truckee Lake camp based on descriptions by William Graves (Note: This drawing is inaccurate in several respects: the cabins were spread so far apart that Patrick Breen in his diary came to call inhabitants of other cabins "strangers" whose visits were rare. Furthermore, this scene shows a great deal of activity and livestock, when the migrants were weakened already by low rations and livestock began to die almost immediately. It also neglects to include the snow that met the migrants from the day they arrived.)

Life at Truckee Lake was miserable. The cabins were cramped and filthy, and it snowed so much that people were unable to go outdoors for days. Diets soon consisted of oxhide, strips of which were boiled to make a "disagreeable" glue-like jelly. Ox and horse bones were boiled repeatedly to make soup, and they became so brittle that they would crumble upon chewing. Sometimes they were softened by being charred and eaten. Bit by bit, the Murphy children picked apart the oxhide rug that lay in front of their fireplace, roasted it in the fire and ate it. After a party set out on makeshift snowshoes in an attempt to cross the mountain pass, two-thirds of those remaining at Truckee Lake were children. Mrs. Graves was in charge of eight, and Levinah Murphy and Eleanor Eddy together took care of nine. Migrants caught and ate mice that strayed into their cabins. Many were soon weakened and spent most of their time in bed. Occasionally one would be able to make the full-day trek to see the Donners. News came that Jacob Donner and three hired men had died. One of them, Joseph Reinhardt, confessed on his deathbed that he had murdered Wolfinger. George Donner's hand had become infected, which left four men to work at the Donner camp.

Margret Reed had managed to save enough food for a Christmas pot of soup, to the delight of her children, but by January they were facing starvation and considered eating the oxhides that served as their roof. Margret Reed, Virginia Reed, Milt Elliott and the servant girl Eliza Williams attempted to walk out, reasoning that it would be better to try to bring food back than sit and watch the children starve. They were gone for four days in the snow before they had to turn back. Their cabin was now uninhabitable; the oxhide roof served as their food supply, and the family moved in with the Breens. The servants went to live with other families. One day, the Graveses came by to collect on the debt owed by the Reeds and took the oxhides, all that the family had to eat.

=== "The Forlorn Hope" ===
Members of "The Forlorn Hope"
Name	Age
Antonio†	23‡
Luis†	19‡
Salvador†	28‡
Charles Burger*	30‡
Patrick Dolan†	35‡
William Eddy	28‡
Jay Fosdick†	23‡
Sarah Fosdick	21
Sarah Foster	19
William Foster	30
Franklin Graves†	57
Mary Ann Graves	19
Lemuel Murphy†	12
William Murphy*	10
Amanda McCutchen	23
Harriet Pike	18
Charles Stanton†	30
† died en route * turned back before reaching pass ‡ estimated age

The mountain party at Truckee Lake began to fail. Augustus Spitzer and Baylis Williams (a driver for the Reeds) died, more from malnutrition than starvation. Franklin Graves fashioned 14 pairs of snowshoes out of oxbows and hide. On December 16, a party of 17 men, women and children set out on foot in an attempt to cross the mountain pass. As evidence of how grim their choices were, four of the men were fathers. Three of the women, who were mothers, gave their young children to other women. They packed lightly, taking what had become six days' rations, a rifle, a blanket each, a hatchet and some pistols, hoping to make their way to Bear Valley. Historian Charles McGlashan later called this snowshoe party the "Forlorn Hope". Two of those without snowshoes, Charles Burger and 10-year-old William Murphy, turned back early on. Other members of the party fashioned snowshoes for 12-year-old Lemuel Murphy on the first evening from one of the packsaddles that they were carrying.

The snowshoes proved to be awkward but effective on the arduous climb. The members of the party were neither well-nourished nor accustomed to camping in snow 12 feet (3.7 m) deep, and by the third day, most were snowblind. On the sixth day, Eddy discovered his wife had hidden a half-pound of bear meat in his pack. The group set out again the morning of December 21; Stanton had been straggling for several days and he remained behind, saying he would follow shortly. His remains were found at that location the following year.

The group became lost and confused. After two more days without food, Patrick Dolan suggested drawing lots to choose a victim to be eaten by the others. Eddy instead suggested a duel, and eventually that they keep moving until someone simply fell, but a blizzard forced the group to halt. Antonio, the animal handler, was the first to die; Franklin Graves was the next casualty.

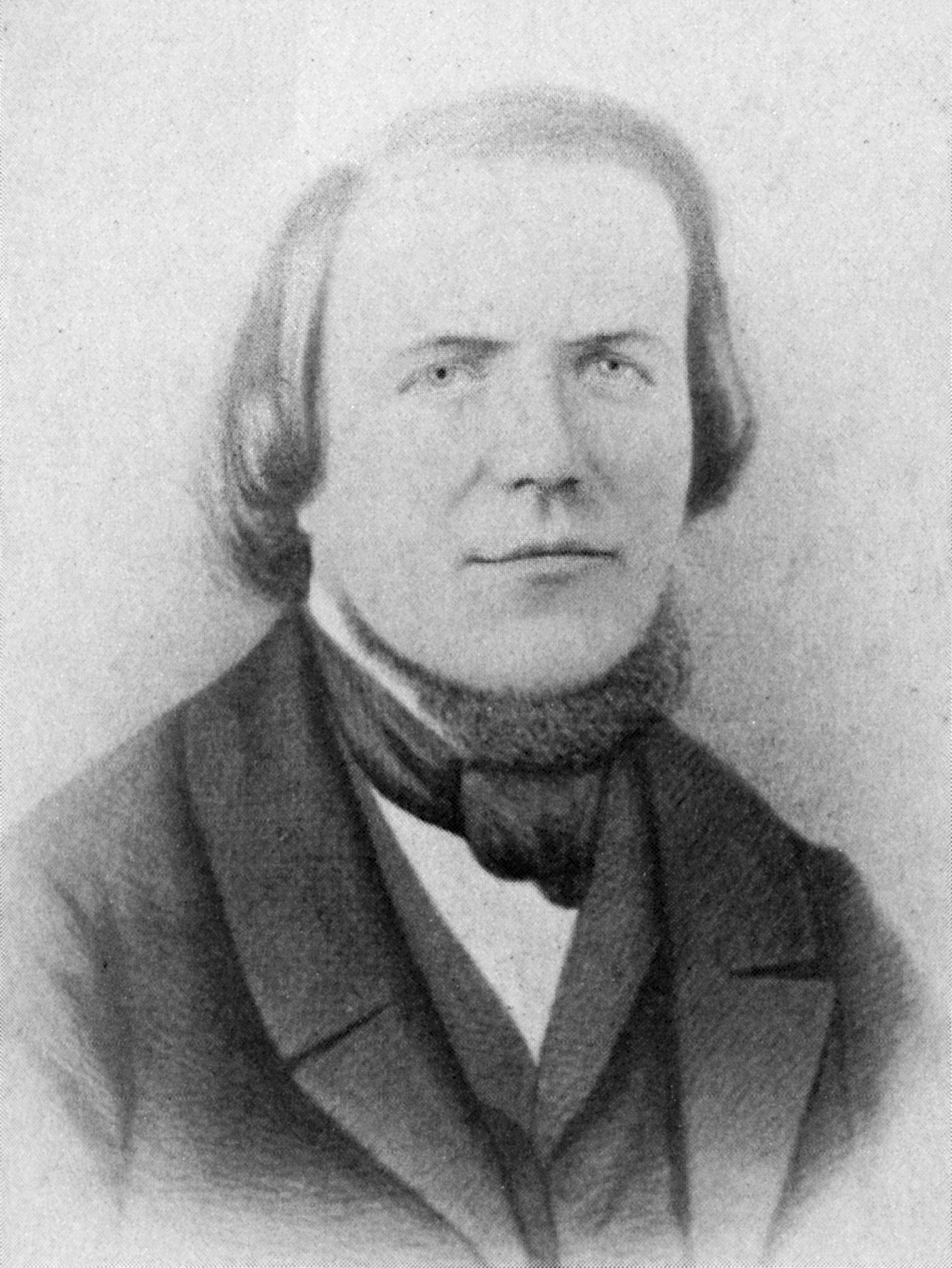
William H. Eddy

As the blizzard progressed, Dolan began to rant deliriously, stripped off his clothes, and ran into the woods. He returned shortly afterwards and died a few hours later. Not long after, possibly because Murphy was near death, some of the group began to eat flesh from Dolan's body. Lemuel's sister Sarah tried to feed him some, but he died shortly afterwards. Eddy, Salvador and Luis refused to eat. The next morning, the group stripped the muscle and organs from the bodies of Antonio, Dolan, Graves, and Murphy. They dried them to store for the days ahead, taking care to ensure nobody would have to eat his or her relatives.

After three days' rest, they set off again, searching for the trail. Eddy eventually succumbed to his hunger and ate human flesh, but that was soon gone. They began taking apart their snowshoes to eat the oxhide webbing and discussed murdering Luis and Salvador for food. Eddy warned the two men and they quietly left. Jay Fosdick died during the night, leaving only seven members of the party. Eddy and Mary Graves left to hunt, but when they returned with deer meat, Fosdick's body had already been cut apart for food. After several more days—25 since they had left Truckee Lake—they came across Salvador and Luis, who had not eaten for about nine days and were probably close to death. William Foster shot both men, thus realizing his plans from before they had left; their bodies were butchered and their flesh dried for consumption. Though the murder was not kept secret, Kristin Johnson notes that "Foster was not greatly blamed" for it and spent the rest of his life without being troubled by the authorities—this can be attributed to the general attitude, as expressed by Lewis Petrinovich, that the lives of Native Americans "seemed to matter little".

Not more than a few days later, (Note: Sources give dates ranging from January 9 to January 12. (McGlashan, 1947 Stanford edition, Editor's foreword, pp. xii–xiii, xxxvi) (Johnson, pp. 62, 121)) the group stumbled into a Native American settlement looking so deteriorated that the camp's inhabitants initially fled. The Native Americans gave them what they had to eat: acorns, grass and pine nuts. After a few days, Eddy continued on with the help of tribe members to a ranch in a small farming community at the edge of the Sacramento Valley. A hurriedly assembled rescue party found the other six survivors on January 17. Their journey from Truckee Lake had taken 33 days.

== Rescue ==
=== Initial rescue attempt ===
James Reed made it out of the Sierra Nevada to Rancho Johnson in late October. He was safe and recovering at Sutter's Fort, but each day he became more concerned for the fate of his family and friends. He pleaded with Colonel John C. Frémont to gather a team of men to cross the pass and help the party. In return, Reed promised to join Frémont's forces and fight in the Mexican–American War. He was joined by McCutchen, who had been unable to return with Stanton, as well as some members of the Harlan–Young Party. The Harlan–Young wagon train had arrived at Sutter's Fort on October 8, the last to make it over the Sierra Nevada that season. The party of roughly 30 horses and a dozen men carried food supplies, and expected to find the Donner Party on the western side of the mountain, along the Bear River below the steep approach to Emigrant Gap, perhaps starving but alive. When they arrived in the river valley, they found only a migrant couple who had been separated from their company and were near starvation.

Two guides deserted Reed and McCutchen with some of their horses, but they pressed on farther up the valley to Yuba Bottoms, walking the last mile on foot. Reed and McCutchen stood looking up at Emigrant Gap, only 12 miles (19 km) from the top, blocked by snow, possibly on the same day the Breens attempted to lead one last effort to crest the pass from the east. Despondent, they turned back to Sutter's Fort.

=== First relief ===
Members rescued by first relief
Name	Age
Elitha Donner	14
Leanna Donner	12
George Donner, Jr.	9
William Hook†	12
Margret Reed	32
Virginia Reed	13
James Reed, Jr.	6
Edward Breen	13
Simon Breen	8
William Graves	17
Eleanor Graves	14
Lovina Graves	12
Mary Murphy	14
William Murphy	10
Naomi Pike	2
Philippine Keseberg	23
Ada Keseberg†	3
Doris Wolfinger	20
John Denton†	28
Noah James	20
Eliza Williams	31
† died en route

Much of the military in California were engaged in the Mexican–American War, and with them the able-bodied men. Throughout the region, roads were blocked, communications compromised and supplies unavailable. Only three men responded to a call for volunteers to rescue the Donner Party. Reed was laid over in San Jose until February because of regional uprisings and general confusion. He spent that time speaking with other pioneers and acquaintances. The people of San Jose responded by creating a petition to the United States Navy to assist the people at Truckee Lake. Two local newspapers reported that members of the snowshoe party had resorted to cannibalism, which helped to foster sympathy for those still trapped. Residents of Yerba Buena, many of them recent migrants, raised $1,300 ($44,900 in 2025) and organized relief efforts to build two camps to supply a rescue party for the refugees.

A rescue party including William Eddy started on February 4 from the Sacramento Valley. Rain and a swollen river forced several delays. Eddy stationed himself at Bear Valley, while the others made steady progress through the snow and storms to cross the pass to Truckee Lake, caching their food at stations along the way so they did not have to carry it all. Three of the rescue party turned back, but seven forged on.

On February 18, the seven-man rescue party scaled Frémont Pass (now Donner Pass); as they neared where Eddy told them the cabins would be, they began to shout. A haggard Mrs. Murphy appeared from a hole in the snow, stared at them and asked, "Are you men from California, or do you come from heaven?" The relief party doled out food in small portions, concerned that it might kill them if the emaciated migrants overate. All the cabins were buried in snow. Sodden oxhide roofs had begun to rot and the smell was overpowering. Thirteen people at the camps were dead, and their bodies had been loosely buried in snow near the cabin roofs. Some of the migrants seemed emotionally unstable. Three of the rescue party trekked to the Donners and brought back four gaunt children and three adults. Leanna Donner had particular difficulty walking up the steep incline from Alder Creek to Truckee Lake, later writing "such pain and misery as I endured that day is beyond description". George Donner's arm was so gangrenous he could not move. Twenty-three people were chosen to go with the rescue party, leaving 21 in the cabins at Truckee Lake and twelve at Alder Creek.

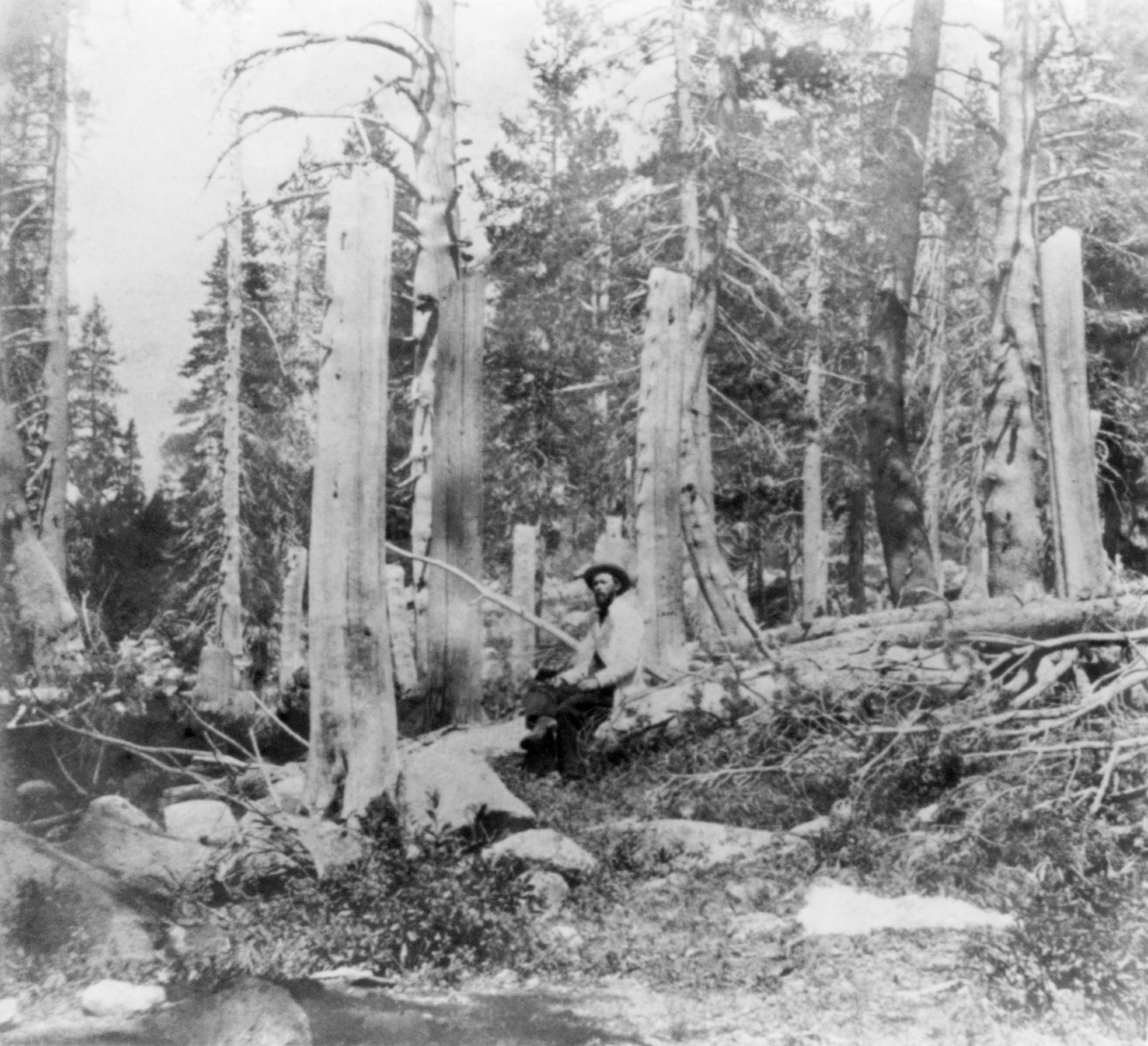
Stumps of trees cut at the Alder Creek site by members of the Donner Party, photograph taken in 1866. The height of the stumps indicates the depth of snow.

The rescuers concealed the fate of the snowshoe party, informing the rescued migrants only that they did not return because they were frostbitten. Patty and Tommy Reed were soon too weak to cross the snowdrifts, and no one was strong enough to carry them. Margret Reed faced the agonizing predicament of accompanying her two older children to Bear Valley and watching her two frailest be taken back to Truckee Lake without a parent. She made rescuer Aquilla Glover swear on his honor as a Mason that he would return for her children. Patty told her, "Well, mother, if you never see me again, do the best you can." Upon their return to the lake, the Breens refused them entry to their cabin, but after Glover left more food, the children were grudgingly admitted.

The rescue party was dismayed to find that the first cache station had been broken into by animals, leaving them without food for four days. After struggling on the walk over the pass, John Denton slipped into a coma and died. Ada Keseberg died soon afterwards; her mother was inconsolable, refusing to let the child's body go. After several days' more travel through difficult country, the rescuers grew very concerned that the children would not survive. Some of them ate the buckskin fringe from one of the rescuer's pants, and the shoelaces of another, to the relief party's surprise. On their way down from the mountains, they met the next rescue party, which included James Reed. Upon hearing his voice, Margret sank into the snow, overwhelmed.

After those rescued migrants made it safely into Bear Valley, William Hook, Jacob Donner's stepson, broke into food stores and fatally gorged himself. The others continued to Sutter's Fort, where Virginia Reed wrote, "I really thought I had stepped over into paradise". She was amused to note one of the young men asked her to marry him, although she was only 13 and recovering from starvation, but she turned him down.

=== Second relief ===
Members rescued by second relief
Name	Age
Isaac Donner†	5
Patty Reed	9
Thomas Reed	4
Patrick Breen*	51
Margaret Breen*	40
John Breen*	14
Patrick Breen, Jr.*	9
James Breen*	5
Peter Breen*	3
Isabella Breen*	1
Elizabeth Graves†	45
Nancy Graves*	9
Jonathan Graves*	7
Franklin Ward Graves, Jr.†	5
Elizabeth Graves*	1
Mary Donner*	7
Solomon Hook	15
† died en route * came out with John Stark

Around the time the first relief party was being organized, nearby California settler and patriarch George C. Yount (who had likely previously heard of the plight of the Donner Party) had distressing dreams of a struggling group of starving pioneers in deep snow. Yount, Mariano Guadalupe Vallejo and others then raised five hundred dollars to send out another rescue party.

On March 1, the second relief party arrived at Truckee Lake. Those rescuers included veteran mountain men, notably John Turner, who accompanied the return of Reed and McCutchen. Reed was reunited with his daughter Patty and his weakened son Tommy. An inspection of the Breen cabin found its occupants relatively well, but the Murphy cabin, according to author George R. Stewart, "passed the limits of description and almost of imagination". Levinah Murphy was caring for her eight-year-old son Simon and the two young children of William Eddy and Foster. She had deteriorated mentally and was nearly blind. The children were listless and had not been cleaned in days. Lewis Keseberg had moved in and could barely move due to an injured leg.

No one at Truckee Lake had died between the departure of the first and the arrival of the second relief party. Patrick Breen documented a disturbing visit in the last week of February from Mrs. Murphy, who said her family was considering eating Milt Elliott. Reed and McCutchen found Elliott's mutilated body. The Alder Creek camp fared no better. The first two members of the relief party to reach it saw Trudeau carrying a human leg. When they made their presence known, he threw it into a hole in the snow that contained the mostly dismembered body of Jacob Donner. Inside the tent, Elizabeth Donner refused to eat, although her children were being nourished by their father's organs. The rescuers discovered three other bodies had already been consumed. In the other tent, Tamsen Donner was well, but George was very ill because the infection had reached his shoulder.

The second relief evacuated 17 migrants from Truckee Lake, only three of whom were adults. Both the Breen and Graves families prepared to go. Only five people remained at Truckee Lake: Keseberg, Mrs. Murphy and her son Simon, and the young Eddy and Foster children. Tamsen Donner elected to stay with her ailing husband after Reed informed her that a third relief party would arrive soon. Mrs. Donner kept her daughters Eliza, Georgia and Frances with her.

The walk back to Bear Valley was very slow. At one point, Reed sent two men ahead to retrieve the first cache of food, expecting the third relief, a small party led by Selim E. Woodworth, to come at any moment. A violent blizzard arose after they scaled the pass. Five-year-old Isaac Donner froze to death, and Reed nearly died. Mary Donner's feet were badly burned because they were so frostbitten that she did not realize she was sleeping with them in the fire. When the storm passed, the Breen and Graves families were too apathetic and exhausted to move, having not eaten for days. The relief party had no choice but to leave without them. The site where the Breens and Graves had been left became known as 'Starved Camp'. Margaret Breen reportedly took the initiative to try to keep the members of the camp alive after the others departed down the mountain. However, Elizabeth Graves and her son Franklin soon perished, before the next rescue party could reach them, and the remaining party ate the flesh of their dead bodies to survive.

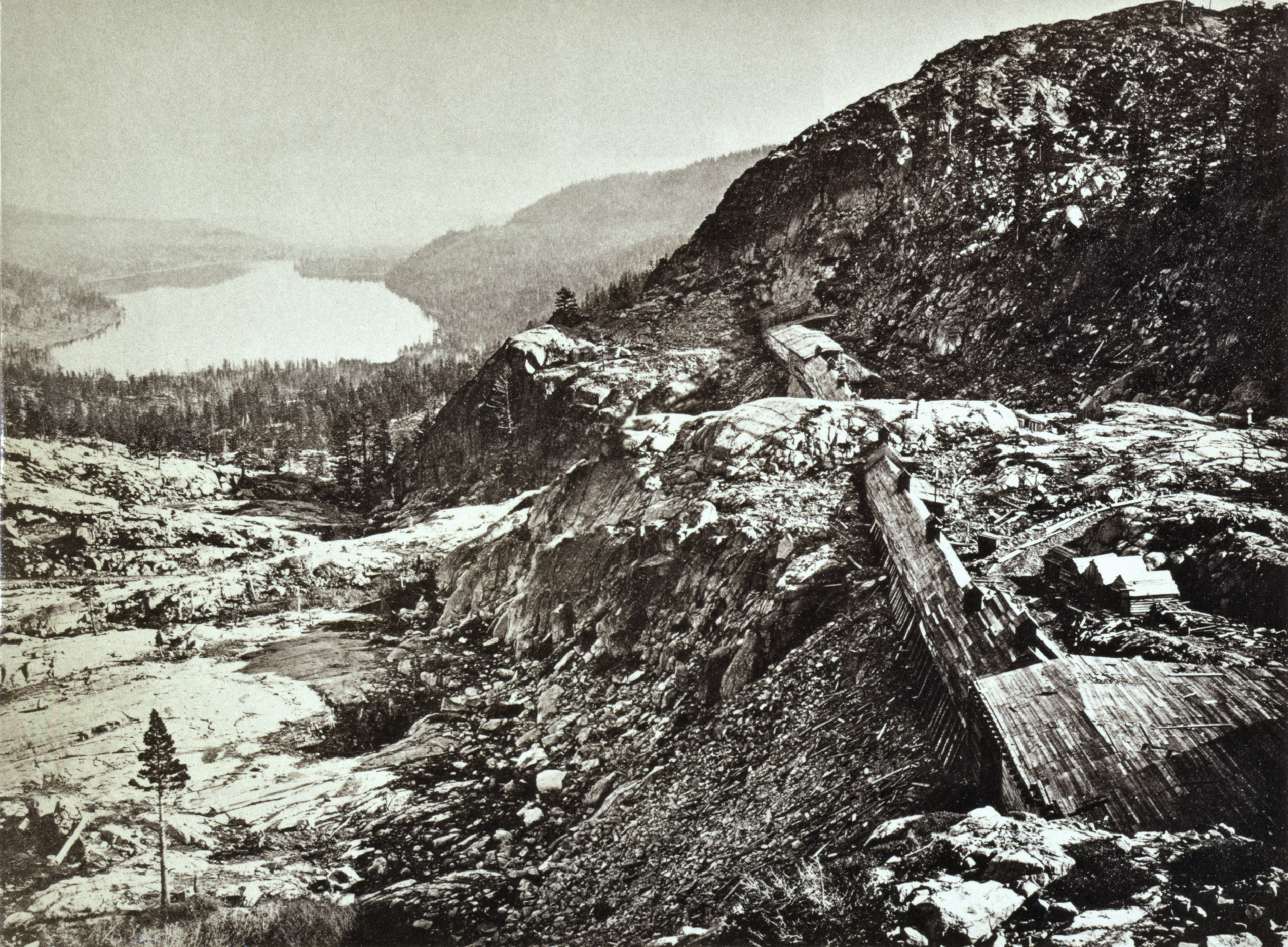
View of Truckee Lake from Donner Pass, taken in 1868 as the Central Pacific Railroad reached completion

Three members of the relief party stayed to help those remaining at the camps: Charles Stone at Truckee Lake, and Charles Cady and Nicholas Clark at Alder Creek. While Clark was out hunting, Stone traveled to Alder Creek and made plans with Cady to return to California. According to Stewart, Tamsen Donner arranged for them to take her daughters Eliza, Georgia and Frances with them, perhaps for $500 cash. Stone and Cady took the three girls to Truckee Lake but left them at a cabin with Keseberg and Levinah Murphy when they started for Bear Valley. Cady recalled later that after two days on the trail they passed Starved Camp, but they did not stop to help. They overtook Reed and the others within days. Several days later, at the Alder Creek camp, Clark and Trudeau agreed to leave for California together. When they reached Truckee Lake and discovered the Donner girls still there, they returned to Alder Creek to inform Tamsen Donner.

William Foster and William Eddy, survivors of the snowshoe party, started from Bear Valley to intercept Reed, taking with them a man named John Stark. After a day, they met Reed helping his children struggle on toward Bear Valley, all frostbitten and bleeding but alive. Desperate to rescue their own children, Foster and Eddy persuaded four men, with pleading and money, to go to Truckee Lake with them. During their journey they found the eleven survivors at Starved Camp, huddled around a fire that had sunk into a pit. The relief party split, with Foster, Eddy, and two others headed toward Truckee Lake. Two of the rescuers each took a child and headed back to Bear Valley. John Stark refused to leave the others. He picked up two children and all the provisions and assisted the remaining Breens and Graveses to safety, sometimes advancing the children down the trail piece-meal, putting them down and then going back to carry the other debilitated children.

=== Third relief ===
Members rescued by third relief
Name	Age
Eliza Donner	3
Georgia Donner	4
Frances Donner	6
Simon Murphy	8
Jean Baptiste Trudeau	16

Foster and Eddy finally arrived at Truckee Lake on March 14, where they found their children dead. Keseberg told Eddy that he had eaten the remains of Eddy's son; Eddy swore to murder Keseberg if they ever met in California. George Donner and one of Jacob Donner's children were still alive at Alder Creek. Tamsen Donner had just arrived at the Murphy cabin to see to her daughters. She chose to return to her husband, even though she was informed that no other relief party was likely to be coming soon. The third relief left with the Donner girls, young Simon Murphy, Trudeau and Clark. Levinah Murphy was too weak to leave and Keseberg refused.

Two more relief parties were mustered to evacuate any adults who might still be alive. Both turned back before getting to Bear Valley, and no further attempts were made. On April 10, almost a month after the third relief left Truckee Lake, the alcalde near Sutter's Fort organized a salvage party to recover what they could of the Donners' belongings. Those were sold, with part of the proceeds used to support the orphaned Donner children. The salvage party found the Alder Creek tents empty except for the body of George Donner, who had died only days earlier. On their way back to Truckee Lake, they found Lewis Keseberg alive. According to him, Mrs. Murphy had died a week after the departure of the third relief. Some weeks later, Tamsen Donner had arrived at his cabin on her way over the pass, soaked and visibly upset. Keseberg said he put a blanket around her and told her to start out in the morning, but she died during the night. The salvage party were suspicious of Keseberg's story and found a pot full of human flesh in the cabin along with George Donner's pistols, jewelry and $250 in gold. They threatened to lynch Keseberg, who confessed that he had cached $273 of the Donners' money, at Tamsen's suggestion, so that it could one day benefit her children.

=== Response ===
A more revolting or appalling spectacle I never witnessed. The remains here, by order of Gen. Kearny collected and buried under the superintendence of Major Swords. They were interred in a pit which had been dug in the centre of one of the cabins for a cache. These melancholy duties to the dead being performed, the cabins, by order of Major Swords, were fired, and with every thing surrounded them connected with this horrid and melancholy tragedy, were consumed. The body of George Donner was found at his camp, about eight or ten miles distant, wrapped in a sheet. He was buried by a party of men detailed for that purpose.

— Member of General Stephen W. Kearny's company, June 22, 1847

News of the Donner Party's fate was spread eastward by journalist Samuel Brannan, who ran into the salvage party as they came down from the pass with Keseberg. Accounts of the ordeal first reached New York City in July 1847. Reporting on the event across the U.S. was heavily influenced by the national enthusiasm for westward migration. In some papers, news of the tragedy was buried in small paragraphs, despite the contemporary tendency to sensationalize stories. Several newspapers, including those in California, wrote about the cannibalism in graphic, exaggerated detail. In some accounts, the members of the Donner Party were depicted as heroes and California a paradise worthy of significant sacrifices.

Emigration to the West decreased over the following years, but it is likely that the drop in numbers was caused by fears over the ongoing Mexican–American War. In 1846, an estimated 1,500 people migrated to California. In 1847, the number dropped to 450 and then to 400 in 1848. The California Gold Rush spurred a sharp increase, however: 25,000 people went west in 1849. Most of the overland migration followed the Carson River, but a few forty-niners used the same route as the Donner Party and recorded descriptions of the site.

In June 1847, members of the Mormon Battalion under General Stephen W. Kearny buried the human remains and partially burned two of the cabins. The few who ventured over the pass in the next few years found bones, artifacts and the cabin used by the Reed and Graves families. In 1891, a cache of money was found buried by the lake. It had probably been hastily stored by Mrs. Graves when she left with the second relief so she could return for it later.

Lansford Hastings received death threats for his role in the disaster. A migrant who crossed before the Donner Party confronted him about the difficulties they had encountered, reporting: "Of course he could say nothing but that he was very sorry, and that he meant well."

=== Survivors ===
Of the 87 people who entered the Wasatch Mountains, only 48 survived. Only the Reed and Breen families remained intact. The children of Jacob Donner, George Donner, and Franklin Graves were orphaned. William Eddy was alone; most of the Murphy family had died. Only three mules reached California; the remaining animals perished. Most of the Donner Party members' possessions were discarded.

I have not wrote to you half the trouble we have had but I have wrote enough to let you know that you don't know what trouble is. But thank God we have all got through and the only family that did not eat human flesh. We have left everything but I don't care for that. We have got through with our lives but Don't let this letter dishearten anybody. Never take no cutoffs and hurry along as fast as you can.

— Virginia Reed to cousin Mary Keyes, May 16, 1847 (Note: Virginia Reed was an inconsistent speller and the letter is full of grammar, punctuation and spelling mistakes. It was printed in various forms at least five times and photographed in part. Stewart reprinted the letter with the original spelling and punctuation but amended it to ensure the reader could understand what the girl was trying to say. The representation here is similar to Stewart's, with spelling and punctuation improvements. (Stewart, pp. 348–354.))

A few of the widowed women remarried within months; brides were scarce in California. The Reeds settled in San Jose and two of the Donner children lived with them. Reed fared well in the California Gold Rush and became prosperous. Virginia wrote an extensive letter to her cousin in Illinois about "our troubles getting to California", with editorial oversight from her father. Journalist Edwin Bryant carried it back in June 1847, and it was printed in the Illinois Journal on December 16, 1847, with some editorial alterations. Virginia converted to Catholicism, fulfilling a promise she had made to herself while observing Patrick Breen pray in his cabin.

The Murphy survivors settled in Marysville, while the Breens made their way to San Juan Bautista. The Breen family purchased the Castro Adobe in 1848, with a fortune 16-year-old John Breen earned in California's Gold country, and operated it as an inn. They became the anonymous subjects of J. Ross Browne's story about his severe discomfort upon learning that he was staying with alleged cannibals, printed in Harper's Magazine in 1862. Many of the survivors encountered similar reactions. The Breens' youngest daughter, Isabella, was one year old during the winter of 1846–1847 and the last survivor of the Donner Party. She died in San Francisco on March 25, 1935.

George and Tamsen Donner's children were taken in by an older couple near Sutter's Fort. Eliza was three years old during the winter of 1846–1847, the youngest of the Donner children. She published an account of the Donner Party in 1911, based on printed accounts and those of her sisters.

I will now give you some good and friendly advice. Stay at home,—you are in a good place, where, if sick, you are not in danger of starving to death.

— Mary Graves to Levi Fosdick (her sister Sarah Fosdick's father-in-law), 1847

Mary Graves married early, but her first husband was murdered. She cooked his killer's food while he was in prison to ensure the condemned man lived long enough to be hanged. One of Mary's grandchildren noted she was very serious; she once said, "I wish I could cry but I cannot. If I could forget the tragedy, perhaps I would know how to cry again." Her brother William had several different occupations, a diverse lifestyle, and his nieces thought he was "eccentric and irascible". He died in 1907 and was buried in Calistoga. Nancy Graves, who was nine years old during the winter of 1846–1847, refused to acknowledge her involvement in the events. She reportedly was unable to recover from her role in the cannibalism of her mother and brother.

Eddy remarried and started a family in California. He attempted to follow through on his promise to murder Lewis Keseberg but was dissuaded by James Reed and Edwin Bryant. A year later, Eddy recalled his experiences to J. Quinn Thornton, who wrote the earliest account of the episode, also using Reed's memories. Eddy died in Petaluma on December 24, 1859.

Keseberg brought a defamation suit against several members of the relief party who accused him of murdering Tamsen Donner. The court awarded him $1 in damages, but made him pay court costs. An 1847 story in the California Star described Keseberg's actions in ghoulish terms and his near-lynching by the salvage party. It reported that he preferred eating human flesh over the cattle and horses exposed in the spring thaw. Historian Charles McGlashan amassed enough material to indict Keseberg for the murder of Tamsen Donner, but after interviewing him he concluded no murder occurred. Eliza Donner Houghton also believed Keseberg to be innocent. As Keseberg grew older, he did not venture outside as he had become a pariah and was often threatened. He told McGlashan, "I often think that the Almighty has singled me out, among all the men on the face of the earth, in order to see how much hardship, suffering, and misery a human being can bear!"

== Legacy ==
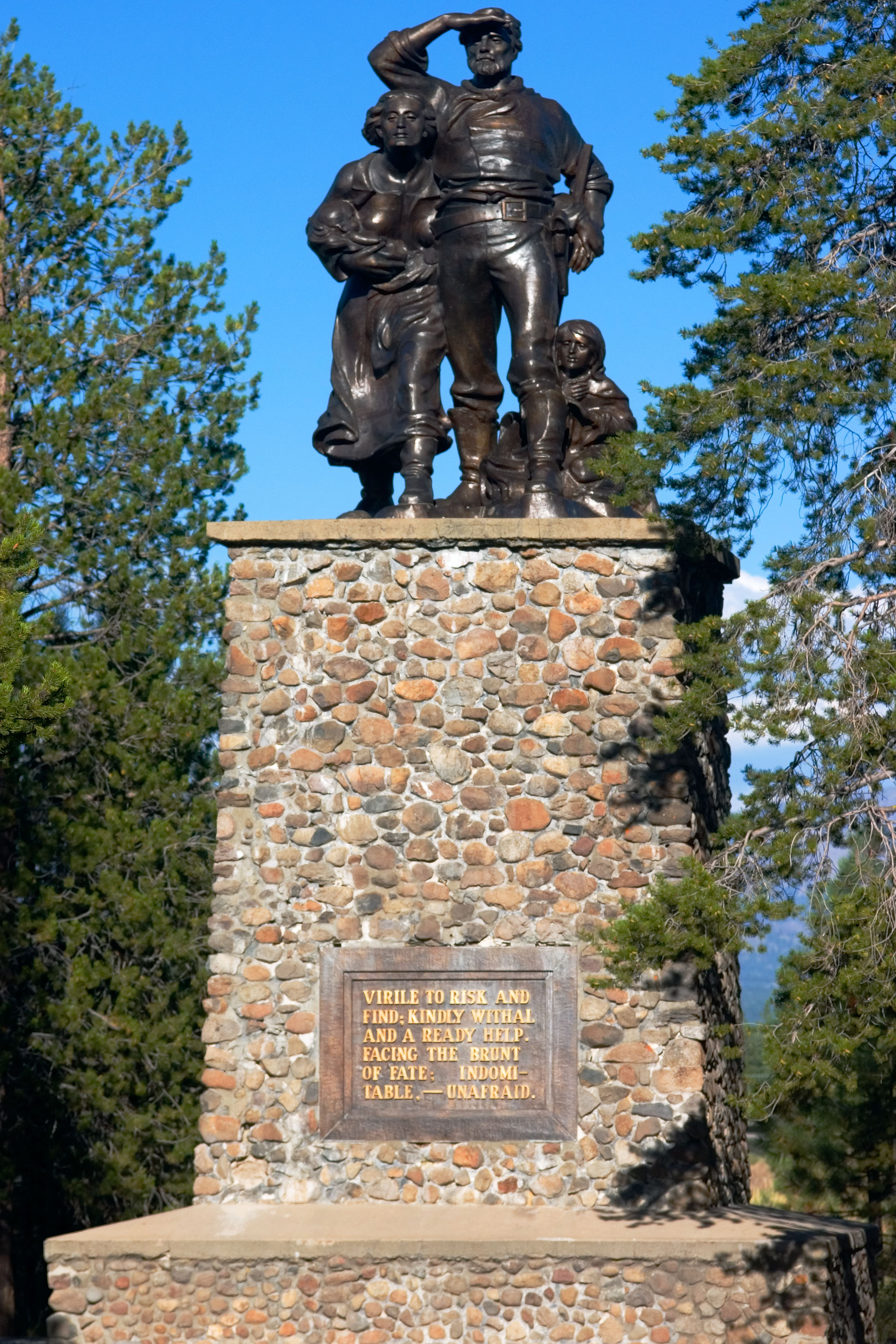
Statue at Donner Memorial State Park, the top of the 22-foot (6.7 m) pedestal indicating how deep the snow was during the winter of 1846–1847

The attention directed at the Donner Party is made possible by reliable accounts of what occurred, according to Stewart, and the fact that "the cannibalism, although it might almost be called a minor episode, has become in the popular mind the chief fact to be remembered about the Donner Party. For a taboo always allures with as great strength as it repels." The appeal is the events focused on families and ordinary people, according to Johnson, writing in 1996, instead of on rare individuals, and that the events are "a dreadful irony that hopes of prosperity, health, and a new life in California's fertile valleys led many only to misery, hunger, and death on her stony threshold".

The site of the cabins became a tourist attraction as early as 1854. In the 1880s, Charles McGlashan began promoting the idea of a monument to mark the site. He helped to acquire the land for a monument, and in June 1918 the statue of a pioneer family, dedicated to the Donner Party, was placed on the spot where the Breen-Keseberg cabin was thought to have stood. It was made a California Historical Landmark in 1934.

The State of California created the Donner Memorial State Park, 11 acres (4.5 ha) surrounding the monument, in 1927. Twenty years later, the site of the Murphy cabin was purchased and added to the park. In 1962, the Emigrant Trail Museum was added to tell the history of westward migration into California. The Murphy cabin and Donner monument were established as a National Historic Landmark in 1963. A large rock served as the back-end of the fireplace of the Murphy cabin, and a bronze plaque has been affixed to the rock listing the members of the party, indicating which survived. The State of California calls the episode "an isolated and tragic incident of American history that has been transformed into a major folk epic". As of 2003, the park receives an estimated 200,000 visitors a year.

=== Mortality ===
Most historians count 87 members of the party, although Stephen McCurdy in the Western Journal of Medicine includes Sarah Keyes—Margret Reed's mother—and Luis and Salvador, bringing the number to 90. Five people had already died before the party reached Truckee Lake: one from tuberculosis (Halloran), three from trauma (Snyder, Wolfinger and Pike), and one from exposure (Hardkoop). A further 34 died between December 1846 and April 1847: twenty-five males and nine females. (Note: Grayson stated in his 1990 mortality study that one-year-old Elizabeth Graves was one of the casualties, but she was rescued by the second relief.) Several researchers have studied the mortalities to determine what factors may affect survival in nutritionally deprived individuals. Of the 15 members of the snowshoe party, eight of the ten men who set out died, but all five women survived. A professor at the University of Washington stated that the Donner Party episode is a "case study of demographically-mediated natural selection in action".

The deaths at Truckee Lake, at Alder Creek and in the snowshoe party were probably caused by a combination of malnutrition, overwork and exposure to cold. Several members became more susceptible to infection due to starvation, such as George Donner, but the three most significant factors in survival were age, sex and the size of family group that each traveled with. The survivors were on average 7.5 years younger; children aged between six and 14 had a much higher survival rate than those under the age of six, of whom 62.5 percent died, including the son born to the Kesebergs on the trail, or adults over the age of 35. No adults over the age of 49 survived. More than 66 percent of males aged between 20 and 39 died. Men metabolize protein faster; women do not require as high a caloric intake and store more body fat, which delays physical degradation caused by starvation and overwork. Men also tend to take on more dangerous tasks, and in that particular instance, the men were required to engage in heavy labor before reaching Truckee Lake, adding to their physical debilitation. Those traveling with family members had a higher survival rate, possibly because family members more readily shared food.

=== Memories and rumors of cannibalism ===
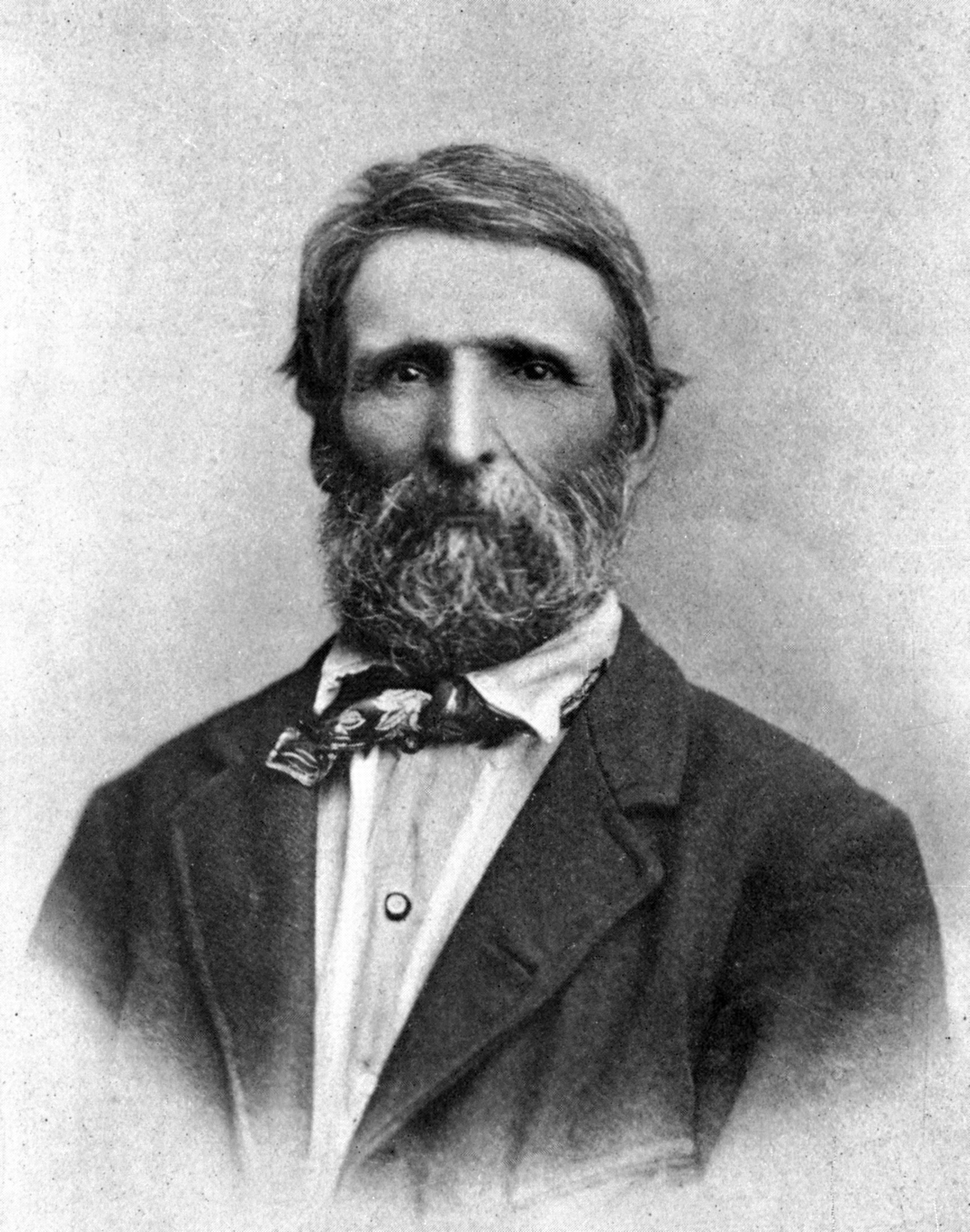
Jean Baptiste Trudeau, pictured here as an adult, gave conflicting accounts of cannibalism at Alder Creek.

Although some survivors disputed the accounts of cannibalism, Charles McGlashan, who corresponded with many of the survivors over a 40-year period, documented many recollections that it occurred. Some correspondents were not forthcoming, approaching their participation with shame, but others eventually spoke about it freely. McGlashan, in his 1879 book History of the Donner Party, declined to include some of the more morbid details—such as the suffering of the children and infants before death—or how Mrs. Murphy, according to Georgia Donner, gave up, lay down on her bed and faced the wall when the last of the children left in the third relief. He also neglected to mention any cannibalism at Alder Creek. The same year McGlashan's book was published, Georgia Donner wrote to him to clarify some points, saying that human flesh was prepared for people in both tents at Alder Creek, but to her recollection (she was four years old during the winter of 1846–1847) it was given only to the youngest children: "Father was crying and did not look at us the entire time, and we little ones felt we could not help it. There was nothing else." She also remembered that Elizabeth Donner, Jacob's wife, announced one morning that she had cooked the arm of Samuel Shoemaker. Eliza Donner Houghton, in her 1911 account, did not mention any cannibalism at Alder Creek.

Archaeological findings at the Alder Creek camp proved inconclusive for evidence of cannibalism. None of the bones tested at the Alder Creek cooking hearth could be identified with certainty as human. According to Rarick, only cooked bones would be preserved, and it is unlikely that the Donner Party members would have needed to cook human bones.

Eliza Farnham's 1856 account of the Donner Party was based largely on an interview with Margaret Breen. Her version details the ordeals of the Graves and Breen families after James Reed and the second relief left them in the snow pit. According to Farnham, seven-year-old Mary Donner suggested to the others that they should eat Isaac Donner, Franklin Graves Jr. and Elizabeth Graves, because the Donners had already begun eating the others at Alder Creek, including Mary's father Jacob. Margaret Breen insisted that she and her family did not cannibalize the dead, but Kristin Johnson, Ethan Rarick and Joseph King—whose account is sympathetic to the Breen family—do not consider it credible that the Breens, who had been without food for nine days, would have survived otherwise. King suggests Farnham included this in her account independently of Margaret Breen.

According to an account published by H. A. Wise in 1847, Trudeau boasted of his own heroism, but also spoke in lurid detail of eating Jacob Donner and said he had eaten a baby raw. Many years later, Trudeau met Eliza Donner Houghton and denied cannibalizing anyone. He reiterated this in an 1891 interview with a St. Louis newspaper. Houghton and the other Donner children were fond of Trudeau, and he of them, despite their circumstances. Author George Stewart considers Trudeau's accounting to Wise more accurate than what he told Houghton in 1884, and asserted that he deserted the Donners. Kristin Johnson, on the other hand, attributes Trudeau's interview with Wise to be a result of "common adolescent desires to be the center of attention and to shock one's elders"; when older, he reconsidered his story, so as not to upset Houghton. Historians Joseph King and Jack Steed call Stewart's characterization "extravagant moralism", particularly because all members of the party were forced to make difficult choices. Ethan Rarick echoed this: "more than the gleaming heroism or sullied villainy, the Donner Party is a story of hard decisions that were neither heroic nor villainous".

== See also ==
- Death Valley '49ers
- Donner Party timeline
- Donner-Reed Museum
- Uruguayan Air Force Flight 571 – 1972 aviation accident in the Andes mountains of Argentina
- Alfred Packer – American prospector and cannibal
- Franklin's lost expedition – 1845–48 British failed Arctic exploration
- List of incidents of cannibalism

== Bibliography ==
- Bagley, Will (2010), So Rugged and So Mountainous: Blazing the Trails to Oregon and California, 1812–1848, University of Oklahoma Press, ISBN 978-0-8061-4103-9
- Dixon, Kelly, Shannon Novak, Gwen Robbins, Julie Schablitsky, Richard Scott, and Guy Tasa (2010), "Men, Women, and Children are Starving: Archaeology of the Donner Family Camp". American Antiquity 75(3):627–656
- Dixon, Kelly (ed.) (2011). An Archaeology of Desperation: Exploring the Donner Party's Alder Creek Camp, University of Oklahoma Press. ISBN 978-0-8061-4210-4
- Hardesty, Donald (1997). The Archaeology of the Donner Party, University of Nevada Press. ISBN 0-87417-290-X
- Johnson, Kristin (ed.) (1996). Unfortunate Emigrants: Narratives of the Donner Party. , Utah State University Press. ISBN 0-87421-204-9
- King, Joseph (1992). Winter of Entrapment: A New Look at the Donner Party, P. D. Meany Company. ISBN 0888350309
- McGlashan, Charles Fayette; Murphy, Virginia Reed; Rojek, Ross (2024). Across the Plains in the Donner Party & History of the Donner Party Omnibus Edition: California's Darkest Winter: True Stories of Hope, Despair, and Survival from the Donner Party Disaster. Capital Books Press. ISBN 978-1-967659-03-6
- McNeese, Tim (2009). The Donner Party: A Doomed Journey, Chelsea House Publications. ISBN 978-1-60413-025-6
- Petrinovich, Lewis F. (2000). The Cannibal Within, Aldine Transaction, ISBN 0-202-02048-7.
- Rarick, Ethan (2008). Desperate Passage: The Donner Party's Perilous Journey West, Oxford University Press, ISBN 0-19-530502-7
- Rehart, Catherine Morison (2000), The Valley's Legends & Legacies III, Word Dancer Press, ISBN 978-1-884995-18-7
- Robbins Schug, Gwen and Kelsey Gray (2011), "Bone Histology and Identification of a Starvation Diet". In: An Archaeology of Desperation: Exploring the Donner Party's Alder Creek Camp. Dixon, K., J. Schablitsky, and S. Novak, eds. Arthur H. Clark Co., University of Oklahoma Press. ISBN 978-0-8061-4210-4
- State of California Park and Recreation Commission (2003), Donner Memorial State Park General Plan and Environmental Report, Volume I. Retrieved March 24, 2010.
- Stewart, George R. (1936). Ordeal by Hunger: The Story of the Donner Party: supplemented edition (1988), Houghton Mifflin. ISBN 0-395-61159-8
- Unruh, John (1993). The Plains Across: The Overland Emigrants and the Trans-Mississippi West, 1840–60, University of Illinois Press. ISBN 0-252-06360-0
