= Hastings Cutoff =

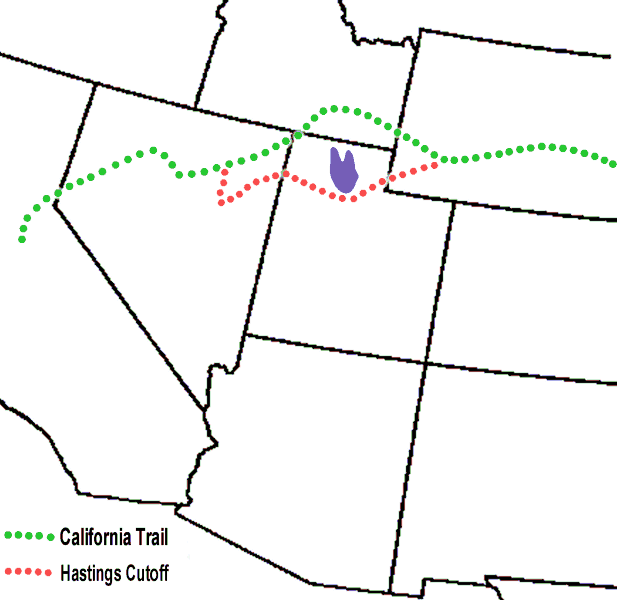
- Route of the California Trail and Hastings Cutoff in the western United States
- Location: Humboldt River Basin, Elko County

Nevada Historical Marker
- Official name: West End of Hastings Cutoff
- Reference no.: 3

The Hastings Cutoff was an alternative route for westward emigrants to travel to California, as proposed by Lansford Hastings in The Emigrant's Guide to Oregon and California. The ill-fated Donner Party took the route in 1846.

== Description ==
A sentence in Hastings' guidebook briefly describes the cutoff:

The most direct route, for the California emigrants, would be to leave the Oregon route, about two hundred miles east from Fort Hall; thence bearing West Southwest, to the Salt Lake; and thence continuing down to the bay of St. Francisco, by the route just described.

The cutoff left the Oregon Trail at Fort Bridger in Wyoming, passed through the Wasatch Range, across the Great Salt Lake Desert (an 80-mile nearly water-less drive), looped around the Ruby Mountains, and rejoined the California Trail about seven miles west of modern Elko (also Emigrant Pass). The west end of the cutoff is marked by Nevada Historical Marker 3.

== Trail use ==
Hastings led a small party overland late in 1845 and spent the winter in California. Significantly, his stay at Sutter's Fort coincided with a visit by John C. Frémont, who had just explored the Great Salt Lake Desert and whose letter describing a new route to California would be widely published in Eastern newspapers. In April, Hastings set out with a few companions to meet the emigration of 1846. He stayed in the vicinity of the Sweetwater River while an eastbound traveler carried his open letter inviting emigrants on the California Trail to meet him at Fort Bridger. Between 60 and 75 wagons did so and traveled with Hastings on his cutoff. They endured a difficult descent down Weber Canyon, a waterless drive of 80 miles across the Great Salt Lake Desert, and a lengthy detour around the Ruby Mountains. Despite the usual trials of overland travel, they arrived safely in California.

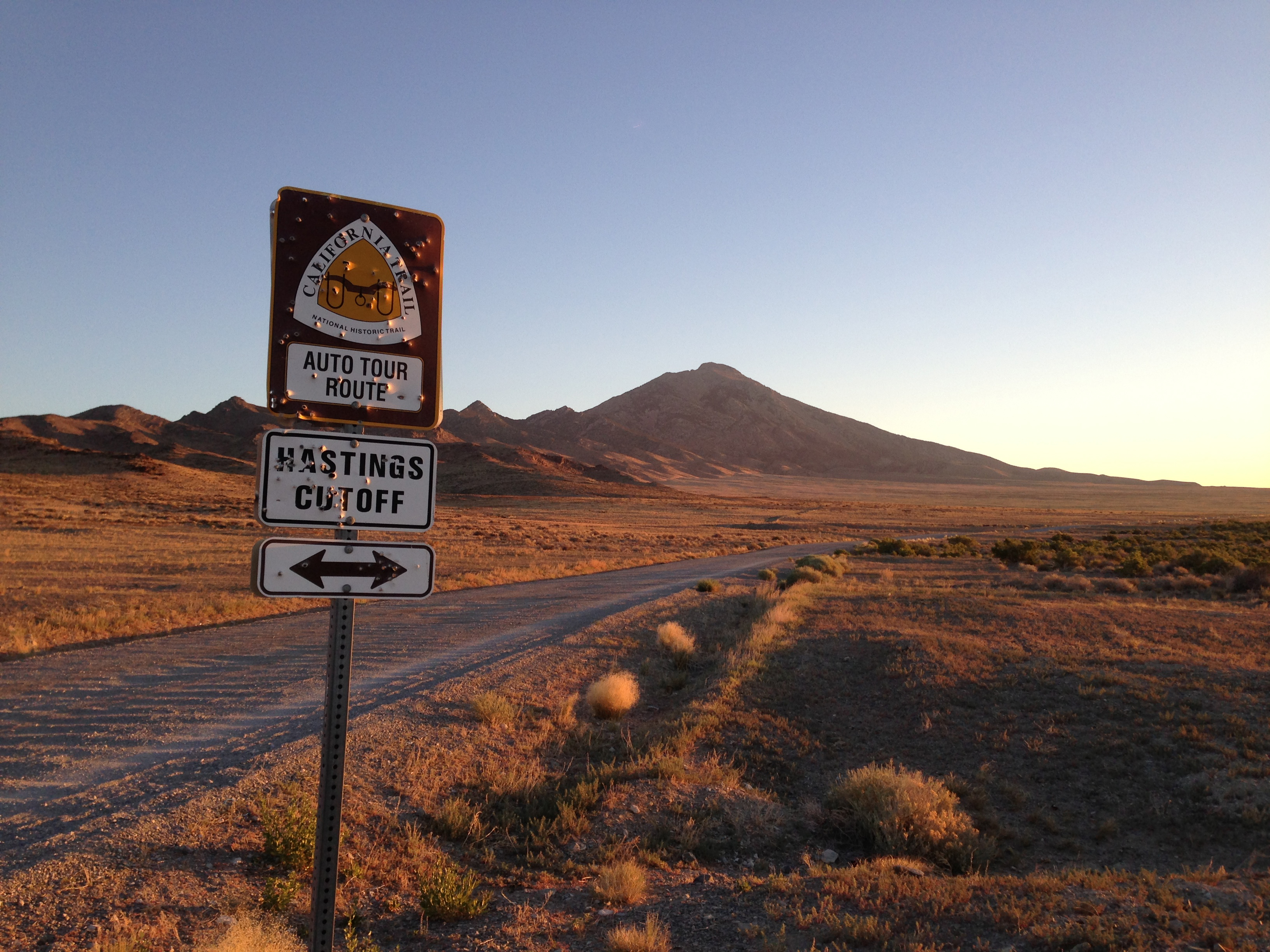
Hastings Cutoff marker near Pilot Peak

The Donner Party, following in the wake of this initial party in 1846, had an unsuccessful experience with the Hastings Cutoff. They had arrived about a week late to travel with Hastings' party, and on Hasting' suggestion they pioneered an alternate route to avoid Weber Canyon. The roadbuilding required through the Wasatch Mountains and the grueling Great Salt Lake Desert delayed them. When they had arrived at the California Trail, they were delayed about a month. The party arrived at Donner Pass just as an early winter storm rendered it impassable. After becoming snowbound in the Sierra Nevada, many died of starvation, and some of the emigrants resorted to eating their animals and deceased members of the group. In 1958, it was reported that path of the party's wagons on the Great Salt Lake Desert were visible not as ruts but as discolorations where the underlying mud was exposed by the wagon wheels. Some sources report that the ruts the party's wagons left on Utah's salt flats can still be seen.

In July 1847, Mormon leader Brigham Young led a vanguard company of emigrants from Winter Quarters, in what is now Omaha, to the future site of Salt Lake City. The company chose to use the Hastings Cutoff passing through modern-day Emigration Canyon. Young's group made remarkable improvements to some parts of the cutoff on their journey so subsequent Mormon companies could more easily make it through to the Salt Lake Valley. William Clayton, the company's scribe, states in his journals that the company tried to follow the route left by the Donner Party the previous year, yet only occasionally could they identify the tracks.

The California gold rush created an enormous increase in westward traffic, and several parties of 1849 and 1850 used the Hastings Cutoff. In 1850 the Salt Lake Cutoff was developed, avoiding the Great Salt Lake Desert. Subsequently, the Hastings Cutoff was abandoned except for portions east of Salt Lake City, where it remained as the end of the Mormon Trail.
