= Wankel =

Wankel may refer to:

- Wankel engine, a type of internal combustion engine using an eccentric rotary design instead of reciprocating pistons
- Wankel AG, a German company that produces Wankel engines for ultralight aircraft and racing cars

== People ==
- Charlotte Wankel (1888–1969), Norwegian painter
- Felix Wankel (1902–1988), German engineer; inventor of the Wankel engine
- Georg Reinholdt Wankel (1843–1907), Norwegian politician
- Heinrich Wankel (1821–1897), Czech palaeontologist

== See also ==
- Wenkel, a surname
