= W2000 =

W2000, W-2000, or WA 2000 may refer to:

- Windows 2000, computer operating system by Microsoft
- Walther WA 2000, semi-automatic sniper rifle released in 1978
- Hercules W-2000, motorcycle manufactured from 1974 to 1977
