= Felix Wankel =

German mechanical engineer (1902–1988)

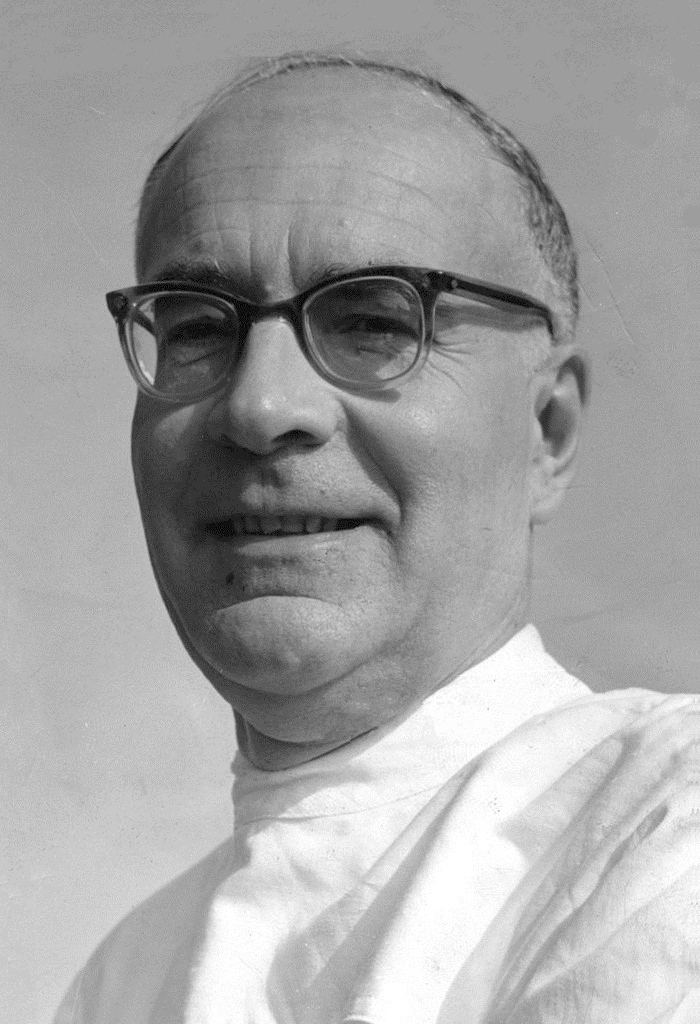
- Wankel in the 1960s
- Born: 13 August 1902; Lahr, Grand Duchy of Baden, German Empire
- Died: 9 October 1988 (aged 86); Heidelberg, Baden-Württemberg, West Germany
- Spouse: Emma "Mi" Kirn
- Engineering career
- Discipline: Mechanical engineering
- Institutions: Paki, Reich Air Ministry, Goetze AG, NSU, Wankel GmbH
- Projects: Wankel engine

Felix Heinrich Wankel (German: [ˈfeːlɪks ˈhaɪnʁɪç ˈvaŋkl̩]; 13 August 1902 – 9 October 1988) was a German mechanical engineer and inventor after whom the Wankel engine was named. Wankel joined various radical antisemitic organizations after World War I and was a prominent member of the Nazi Party.

== Early life ==
Wankel was born in 1902 in Lahr in what was then the Grand Duchy of Baden in the Upper Rhine Plain of present-day southwestern Germany. He was the only son of Gerty Wankel (née Heidlauff) and Rudolf Wankel, a forest assessor. His father died in World War I. Thereafter, the family moved to Heidelberg. He went to high schools in Donaueschingen, Heidelberg, and Weinheim, and left school without Abitur in 1921. He learned the trade of purchaser at the Carl Winter Press in Heidelberg and worked for the publishing house until June 1926. He and some friends had already run an unofficial afterwork machine shop in a backyard shed in Heidelberg since 1924. Wankel was now determined to receive unemployment benefits and to focus on the machine shop. One of his friends, who had graduated from university, gave his name and transformed the shop into an official garage for DKW and Cleveland motor bikes in 1927, where Wankel worked from time to time until his arrest in 1933.

Wankel was gifted since childhood with an ingenious spatial imagination and became interested in the world of machines, especially combustion engines. After his mother was widowed, Wankel could not afford university education or even an apprenticeship. He was, however, able to teach himself technical subjects. At age 17 he told friends that he had dreamt of constructing a car with "a new type of engine, half turbine, half reciprocating. It is my invention!". True to this prediction, he conceived the Wankel engine in 1924 and won his first patent in 1929.

== Wankel and the Nazi Party ==
During the early 1920s Wankel was a member of various radical antisemitic organizations. In 1921, he joined the Heidelberg branch of the Deutschvölkischer Schutz- und Trutzbund and in 1922 he became a member of the Nazi Party (NSDAP), which was banned soon afterwards. Wankel founded and led youth groups associated with a front organization of the NSDAP. With them he conducted paramilitary training, scouting games and night walks. When his high esteem for technical innovations was not widely shared among the German Youth Movement, he was offered instead the opportunity to talk about the issue of technology and education to Adolf Hitler and other leading National Socialists in 1928.

In the meantime, Wankel's mother, Gerty had helped founding the local chapter of the NSDAP in his hometown of Lahr. Here Wankel not only rejoined the party in 1926, but also met the local Gauleiter, i.e. regional head of the NSDAP, Robert Heinrich Wagner. In 1931, Wagner entrusted Wankel with the leadership of the Hitler Youth in Baden. But they soon fell out with each other because Wankel tried to put a stronger emphasis on military training, whereas Wagner wished for the Hitler Youth to be a primarily political organization. In a particularly bitter and ugly controversy, Wankel publicly accused Wagner of corruption. Wagner retaliated by stripping Wankel of his office by early 1932 and managed to have him expelled from the party in October 1932.

Wankel, who sympathized with the social-revolutionary wing of the NSDAP with Gregor Strasser, then founded his own National Socialist splinter group in Lahr and continued his attacks on Wagner. Since the Nazis' seizure of power on 30 January 1933 had strengthened his position, Wagner had Wankel arrested and imprisoned in the Lahr jail in March 1933. Only by intervention of Hitler's economic adviser Wilhelm Keppler and Hitler himself, was Wankel set free in September 1933. A fellow native of Baden and member of Reichstag from 1933 to 1945, Keppler had been a friend of Wankel and an ardent supporter of his technological endeavors since 1927. He now helped Wankel to get state contracts and his own Wankels Versuchs Werkstätten experimental workshop in Lindau.

Wankel tried to rejoin the NSDAP in 1937, but was turned down. With the help of Keppler, however, he was admitted to the SS in 1940 in the rank of Obersturmbannführer. Two years later, his membership was revoked for unknown reasons.

== Career ==
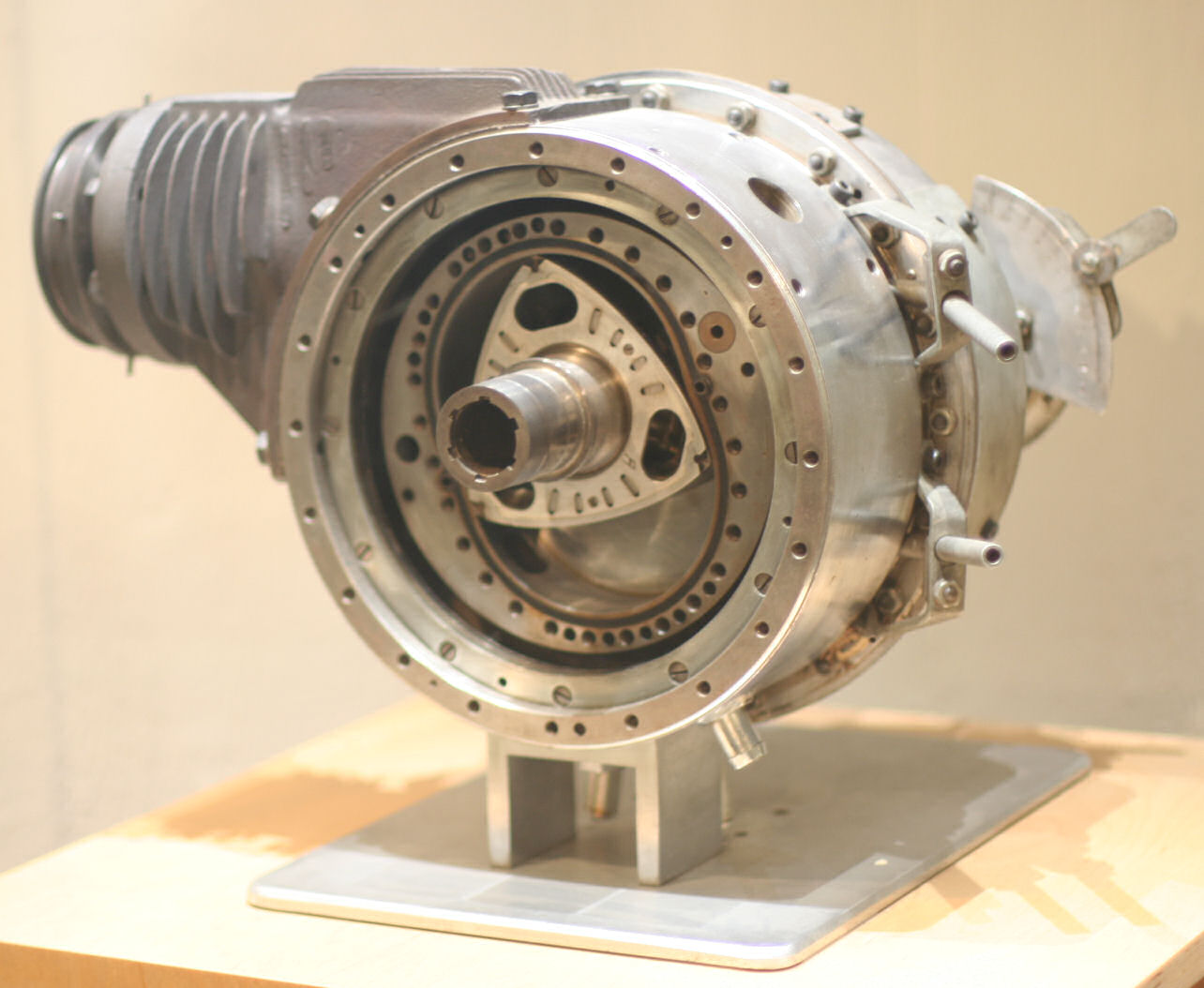
Wankel engine, type DKM54 (1957)

During World War II, Wankel developed seals and rotary valves for German air force aircraft and navy torpedoes, as well as for companies such as BMW and Daimler-Benz. After the war, the region was occupied by France. Wankel was imprisoned by French authorities for several months in 1945 and his laboratory was closed by French occupation troops. Wankel's work was confiscated and he was prohibited from doing any more work. However, by 1951, he got funding from the Goetze AG company to furnish the new Technical Development Center in his privately owned house in Lindau on Lake Constance. He began development of the engine at NSU Motorenwerke AG, leading to the first running prototype on 1 February 1957. Unlike modern Wankel engines, this 21 horsepower version had both the rotor and housing rotating. His engine design was first licensed by Curtiss-Wright in New Jersey, United States.

On 19 January 1960 the rotary engine was presented for the first time to specialists and the press in a meeting of the German Engineers' Union at the Deutsches Museum in Munich. In the same year, with the KKM 250, the first practically applied rotary engine was presented in a converted NSU Prinz automobile. At around this time the term "Wankel engine" became synonymous with the rotary type of engine, whereas previously it was referred to as the "Motor nach System NSU/Wankel". At the 1963 IAA motor show in Frankfurt, the NSU company presented the NSU Wankel-Spider, the first consumer vehicle with a rotary engine, which went into production in 1964. Great attention was received by the NSU in August 1967 for the very modern NSU Ro 80 sedan, which had a 115-horsepower engine with two rotors. It was the first German car named "Car of the Year" in 1968.

In Japan, the manufacturer Mazda licensed the engine and successfully solved various problems relating to chatter marks. The engine was used successfully by Mazda in several generations of their RX-series of coupés and sedans, including the Mazda Cosmo (1967), R100 (1968), the RX-7 (1978–2002), and the RX-8 (2003–2012). Mazda has planned to reintroduce the engine, albeit as a range extender, in their MX-30 R-EV in 2023. Mercedes-Benz fitted one of its C111 experimental models in 1969 with a three-rotor Wankel engine. In 1970, the next model had a four-rotor Wankel engine and could reach top speed 290 km/h but never reached production.

Wankel became a success in business by securing license agreements for the engine to manufacturers around the world. By 1958 Wankel and partners had founded the Wankel GmbH company, providing Wankel with a share of the profits for marketing the engine. Among the licensees were Daimler-Benz since 1961, General Motors since 1970, Toyota since 1971. Among those who paid higher fees for Wankel RCE rights was a state-owned engineering firm of the DDR. Royalties received by Wankel's own company from licensing were 40% at first, which later dropped to 36%. In 1971 Wankel sold his share in licensing royalties for 50 million Deutschmarks (adjusted for inflation, approximately €87m in 2021) to the English conglomerate Lonrho. A year later he got his Technical Development Center back from the Fraunhofer Society research organization. From 1986 the Felix Wankel Institute entered cooperation agreement with Daimler Benz, which covered the institute's operating costs in return for research rights. Wankel later sold the institute to Daimler Benz for 100 million Deutschmarks.

In the context of the developed Wankel engine, "rotary" is something of a misnomer. The Wankel principle applied only to a "rotary piston" and not to the engine as a whole which was a stationary assembly, unlike rotary engines employed in WWI aircraft in which the entire engine rotated about a fixed crankshaft.

== Personal life ==
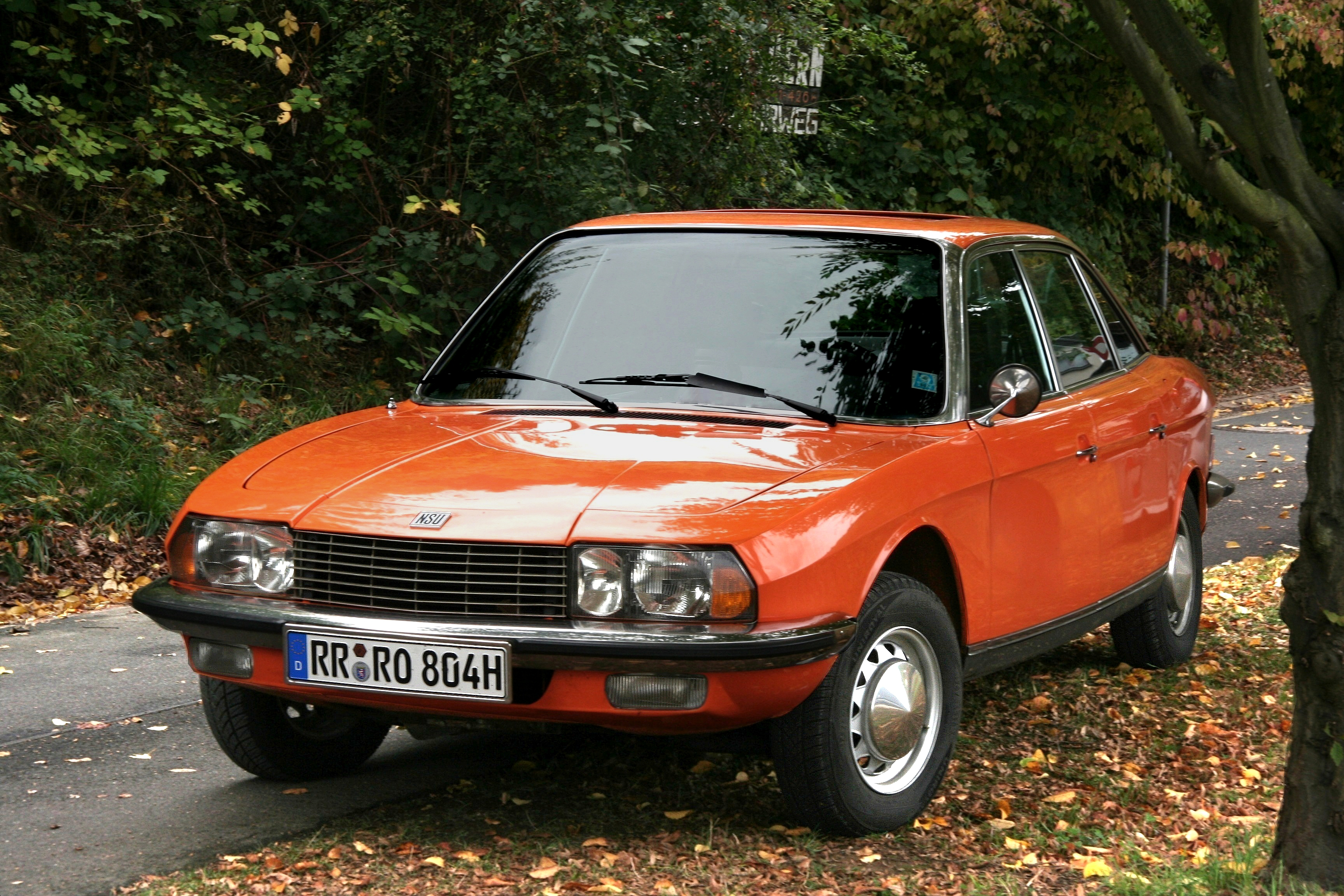
Wankel-engined NSU Ro 80

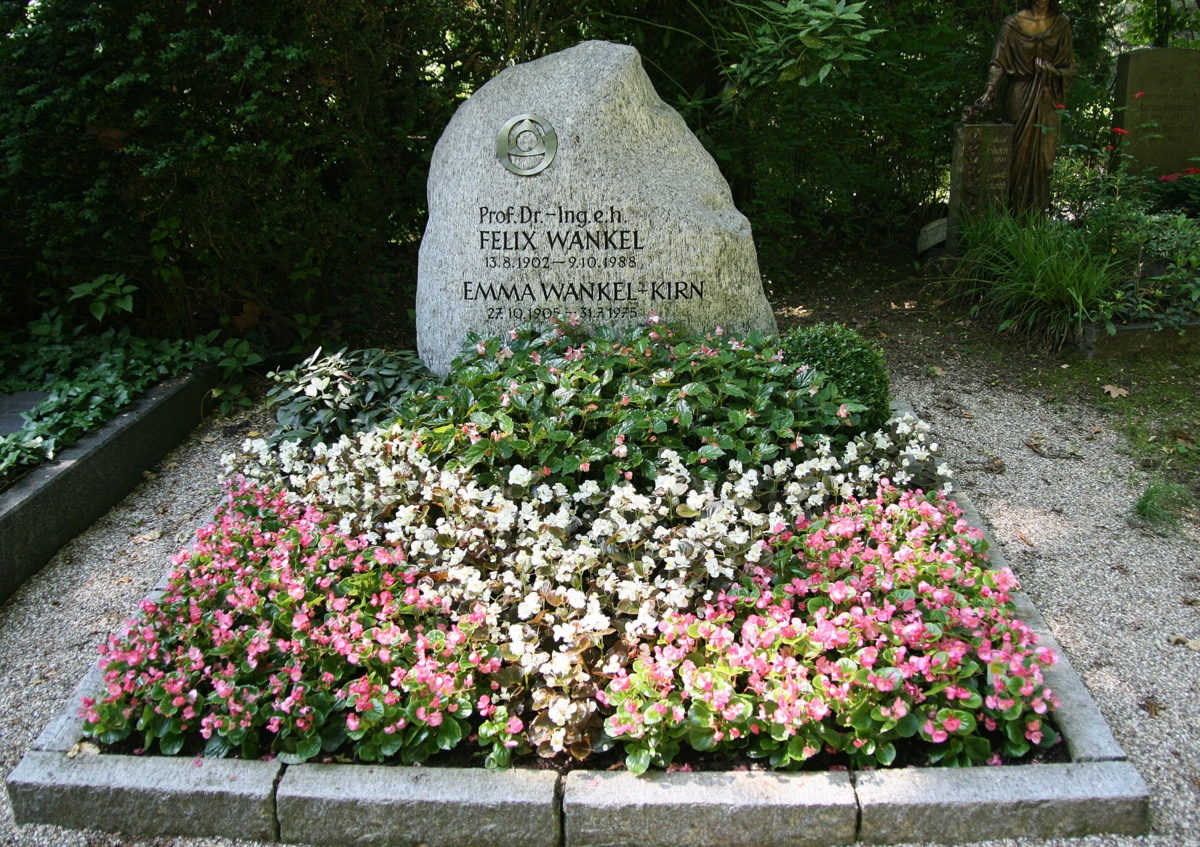
Wankel's grave in Heidelberg

Wankel married Emma "Mi" Kirn in 1936. Though married for life, they had no children. She died in 1975.

He never had a driving license, because he was extremely near-sighted. He was, however, the owner of an NSU Ro 80 with a Wankel engine, which was chauffeur driven for him.

In 1969, Wankel was granted an honorary Doctorate of Engineering from the Technical University of Munich. He was known for his championing of animal rights and opposition to the use of animals in testing.

Wankel died in Heidelberg in October 1988, aged 86. His grave is in the Bergfriedhof of Heidelberg. After his death, the Felix Wankel Foundation sold its real estate property to Volkswagen AG. The Heidelberg Fire Department showcases his last workshop. Wankel's papers are archived in the Technoseum in Mannheim. Furthermore, there is an exhibition "AUTOVISION · Tradition & Forum" in Altlußheim, a permanent showing of over 80 rotary engines and many cars equipped with Wankel motors.

=== Licenses ===
Licensing date	Company	Country	Licensed for
21 October 1958	Curtiss-Wright Corp.	US	Without restriction, no series
29 December 1960	Fichtel & Sachs AG	Germany	Industrial engine and boat, 0.5–30 PS
25 February 1961	Yanmar Diesel Co. Ltd	Japan	Gasoline and Diesel engine, 1–100 PS, 1–300 PS
27 February 1961	Toyo Kogyo, Co. Ltd. (Mazda)	Japan	Gasoline 1–200 PS land vehicles
4 October 1961	Klöckner-Humboldt-Deutz AG	Germany	Diesel engine without restriction
26 October 1961	Daimler-Benz AG	Germany	Gasoline 50 PS upwards
30 October 1961	MAN AG	Germany	Diesel engine without restriction
2 November 1961	Friedrich Krupp AG	Germany	Diesel engine without restriction
12 March 1964	Daimler-Benz AG	Germany	Diesel engine without restriction
15 April 1964	S.p.A. Alfa Romeo	Italy	Gasoline engine 50–300 PS or Passenger car
17 February 1965	Rolls-Royce Motors Ltd.	UK	Diesel and hybrid engines 100–850 Ps
18 February 1965	IFA VEB	Germany	Gasoline engine 0.5–25 PS and 50–150 PS
2 March 1965	Porsche	Germany	Gasoline engine 50–1000 Ps
1 March 1966	Outboard Marine Corp.	US	Gasoline engine 50–400 Ps
11 May 1967	Comotor S.A.	Luxembourg	Gasoline and Diesel engine 40–200 PS
12 September 1967	Graupner/O.S. Engines	Germany/Japan	0,1–3 PS model engines
28 August 1969	Savkel Ltd.	Israel	Gasoline 0.5–30 PS industrial engines
1 October 1970	Nissan	Japan	Gasoline engines 80–120 Ps
10 November 1970	General Motors	US	Everything, except aircraft engines
24 November 1970	Suzuki	Japan	Gasoline engines 20–60 PS for motorcycle
25 May 1971	Toyota	Japan	Gasoline engines 75–150 PS
29 November 1971	Ford-Werke AG, Köln	Germany	Gasoline engines 80–200 PS (1974 quit)
25 July 1972	BSA Ltd.	UK	Gasoline engines 35–60 PS for motorcycle
29 September 1972	Yamaha	Japan	Gasoline engines 20–80 PS for motorcycle
4 October 1971	Kawasaki Heavy Industries Ltd.	Japan	Gasoline engines 20–80 PS for motorcycle
3 February 1973	American Motors (AMC)	US	Gasoline engines 20–200 PS

== Honors and awards ==
- Honorary doctorate degree from the Technical University of Munich, 5 December 1969.
- The Federation of German Engineers (VDI) Gold Medal, 1969.
- The Grand Federal Service Cross, Germany's highest civilian honor, 1970
- John Price Wetherill Medal, Philadelphia, 1971.
- The Bavarian Service Medal, 1973.
- The "Honour Citizen" of Lahr, 1981, and the title of Professor in 1987.
- The Soichiro Honda Medal, 1987.
- Honorary citizenship of Lindau (declined)

== See also ==
- German inventors and discoverers
- NSU Ro 80
- Citroën GS Birotor
- Mazda RX-7
- Mazda RX-8
- AvtoVAZ
- Hercules W2000
- Norton Classic
- Norton Commander
- Suzuki RE5
- Van Veen OCR1000
- MidWest AE series

== Cited sources ==
- Markus Popplow (2011). Felix Wankel: Mehr als ein Erfinderleben. Sutton Verlag GmbH. ISBN 978-3-86680-763-1.
