= Wankel Diesel engine =

Non-functional combustion engine concept

Wankel Diesel engine describes the idea of using the Diesel principle in a Wankel rotary engine. Several attempts to build such an engine have been made by different engineers and manufacturers in the 1960s and 1970s. Due to technical problems and the general disadvantages of the Wankel design, the Wankel Diesel engine never left the prototype stage.

== Design concept ==
 Characteristics of the Diesel engine
- Compression ignition
- Mixture formation inside the combustion chamber
- Engine speed governing solely by mixture quality
- Heterogeneous air-fuel mixture
- High air ratio
- Diffusion flame
- Fuel with high ignition performance

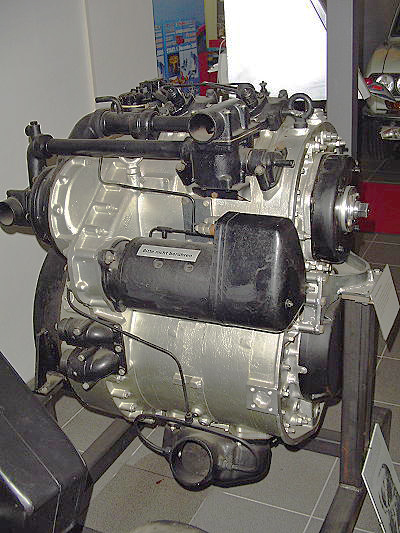
Rolls-Royce 2-R6 prototype, shaped like the 8-digit.

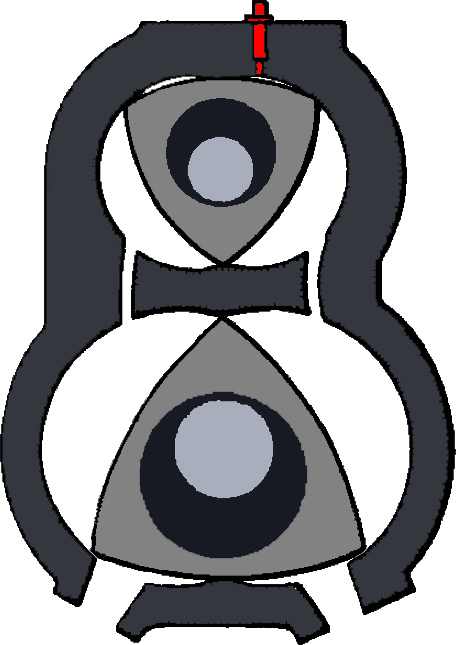
Rolls-Royce R1C prototype.

A Wankel Diesel engine shares its basic design, a triangular-like rotor in an oval, epitrochoid-shaped housing, with a regular Wankel engine. The key difference is that it shares all of its operational characteristics with a Diesel engine. In addition to this, supercharging is required: A regular Diesel engine achieves compression ignition by a high compression ratio, which cannot be done in a Wankel engine due to the shape of the Wankel combustion chamber; supercharging ″artificially″ increases the compression ratio to ensure that compression ignition takes place. Several different approaches of designing a supercharger for a Wankel Diesel engine exist. Wankel designed an external supercharger, whereas Rolls-Royce added a secondary supercharging rotor of a bigger size, making the engine a two-stage rotary, which gave the housing an "8"-like appearance.

== Reasons for designing a Wankel Diesel engine ==
Compared with a Diesel engine, a regular petrol engine has a lower thermal efficiency. However, in the 1960s, the petrol engine advantages of lower mass, fewer vibrations and less noise emissions, all of which are important for passenger cars, were still prevailing. Low mass and smooth engine operation are also characteristics of the Wankel engine – combining Wankel design with Diesel characteristics would result in an efficient engine with low mass and few vibrations. Making a Wankel engine that can burn Diesel engine fuel, but which does not use the Diesel principle, can be useful if Diesel engine fuel is less expensive than petrol. In a 1974 study conducted for the EPA, it was attempted to determine whether or not a Wankel Diesel engine has a better exhaust behaviour than a regular Otto cycle petrol engine.

== Causes of infeasibility ==
The main cause of Wankel Diesel engine infeasibility is the shape of the combustion chamber, located in the rotary piston. It is elongated and convex, thus not allowing a high enough compression ratio (without too much heat loss), even in combination with a (solely crankshaft or exhaust gas driven) supercharger. This means that the engine is only functional if it is fed externally compressed air, as it requires more work to operate than it can produce. Also, designing a proper combustion chamber, correctly angled towards the injection nozzle to allow proper mixture formation, proved to be quite difficult; the EPA study proves that the Wankel Diesel engine's exhaust contains disproportionally high levels of carbon monoxide (CO) and hydrocarbons (HC), indicating incomplete combustion.

== Prototype development ==
=== Diesel-Ring ===
The Diesel-Ring was a joint venture of the German Diesel engine manufacturers Daimler-Benz, MAN, Krupp and KHD. Development was ceased in 1969, because the shape of the Wankel engine combustion chamber was considered unusable for Diesel combustion. The Diesel-Ring, attempts were made to modify the geometry of the epitrochoid and rotor in such a way that a higher compression ratio could be achieved. This was done without increasing the K-number and thus disproportionately increasing the overall volume of the engine. These attempts met with little success, as they resulted in vibrations of the apex seal due to excessive movement in the groove.

=== Rolls-Royce ===
Rolls-Royce began developing a lightweight military Wankel Diesel engine for the MoD in 1964. Fritz Feller was the leading engineer of the project. Soon, it became obvious that a regular Wankel engine would not be suitable for the high compression ratio needed for compression ignition, which led to the idea of using another rotary piston as a supercharger. Early tests were conducted with a modified NSU Wankel engine that was fed pre-heated compressed air to achieve compression ignition. This test engine displaced 0.25 litre and ran for 94 hours before it broke; the fuel consumption ranged from 0.84 lb/hp·h to 1.4 lb/hp·h (511 g/kW·h to 852 g/kW·h). The sealing material proved to be insufficient, leading to high sealing loss; new materials had to be engineered. Furthermore, designing a good combustion chamber, allowing good mixture of air and fuel, turned out to be considerably difficult and thus required a lot of development work. To avoid the problem of having a complicated combustion chamber in the rotor, a precombustion chamber was considered an option, but it was later abandoned, because making a housing with a proper precombustion chamber seemed unfeasible.

The first prototype, made of an NSU KKM 502 Wankel engine, was called R1 and featured a two-stage design with two rotors and an 8-shaped housing. It had a compression chamber volume of 1.126 litre and borrowed its 0.5 litre combustion chamber displacement from the KKM 502. In total, eight different evolutions of the R1 were made, named in alphabetical order, (R1A, R1B, R1C,...). The fifth evolution, which as called R1E, had an increased 1.265 litre compression chamber, but it retained the 0.5 litre combustion chamber. Its power output was about 40 kW; fuel consumption was approximately 220 g/kW·h. The R2 had a 3-rotor design did not get beyond the draft stage; R3 was the first version of a powerplant with a greater displacement, capable of developing more power. The first prototypes having the planned engine size, were called the R4 and R5. In the R5, the first rotor stage was only used for compressing the intake air, the exhaust gas was not used to power it. Instead, the exhaust gas was sent through an external exhaust gas turbine.

In early 1970, the prototype 2-R6 was completed. It is also a two-stage rotary engine, with the smaller combustion rotor on top of the bigger compression rotor. The rotors are connected with a gear ratio of 1 : 1 and rotate in the same direction. Unlike the R5 prototype, the 2-R6 uses the exhaust gas energy with its compression rotor instead of an external exhaust gas turbine. Torque is not taken off the combustion rotor, but the compression rotor instead. The engine has a displacement of 396 in^{3} (6.5 litre) and was supposed to have a power output of 350 hp (261 kW), but having a mass of only 929 lb (421 kg). At the time, this would have been 50% of the mass of a comparable piston Diesel engine with the same power output. Further plans included a more powerful 700 hp (522 kW) version of the engine in addition to the regular 350 hp variant. It is said that due to financial problems, the Wankel Diesel engine project was cancelled in 1974. It was conjectured that the Yom Kippur War made the British Military lose the interest in a compact tank powerplant, resulting in governmental subsidies being cut. It is much more likely though that designing a working Wankel Diesel engine is simply not possible. The Anson Engine Museum has a Rolls-Royce Wankel-Diesel 2-R6 that starts and runs without preheated compressed air. The engine was extensively tested in an FV432, where it was intended to replace the Rolls-Royce K60.

=== Felix Wankel ===
Felix Wankel designed a Wankel Diesel engine with two clover-shaped housings and a compressor in between. Unlike in a regular Wankel engine, the rotary pistons are not shaped like a Reuleaux triangle, but like a bulgy quadrate. The compressor rotor has the shape of an ellipse. Despite the unusual design, this engine was functional under test conditions on a test bed. A second prototype with just one rotor for testing purposes was made. It had a displacement of 0.7 litre and passed a 20-hour test run where it produced a peak torque of 60 N·m.

== Bibliography ==
- Fritz Feller: The 2-stage rotary engine – A new concept in diesel power, Proceedings of the Institution of Mechanical Engineers, 1970–71, Vol. 185 13/71, p. 139–158
