= Suzuki RE5 =

Japanese Wankel engine motorcycle

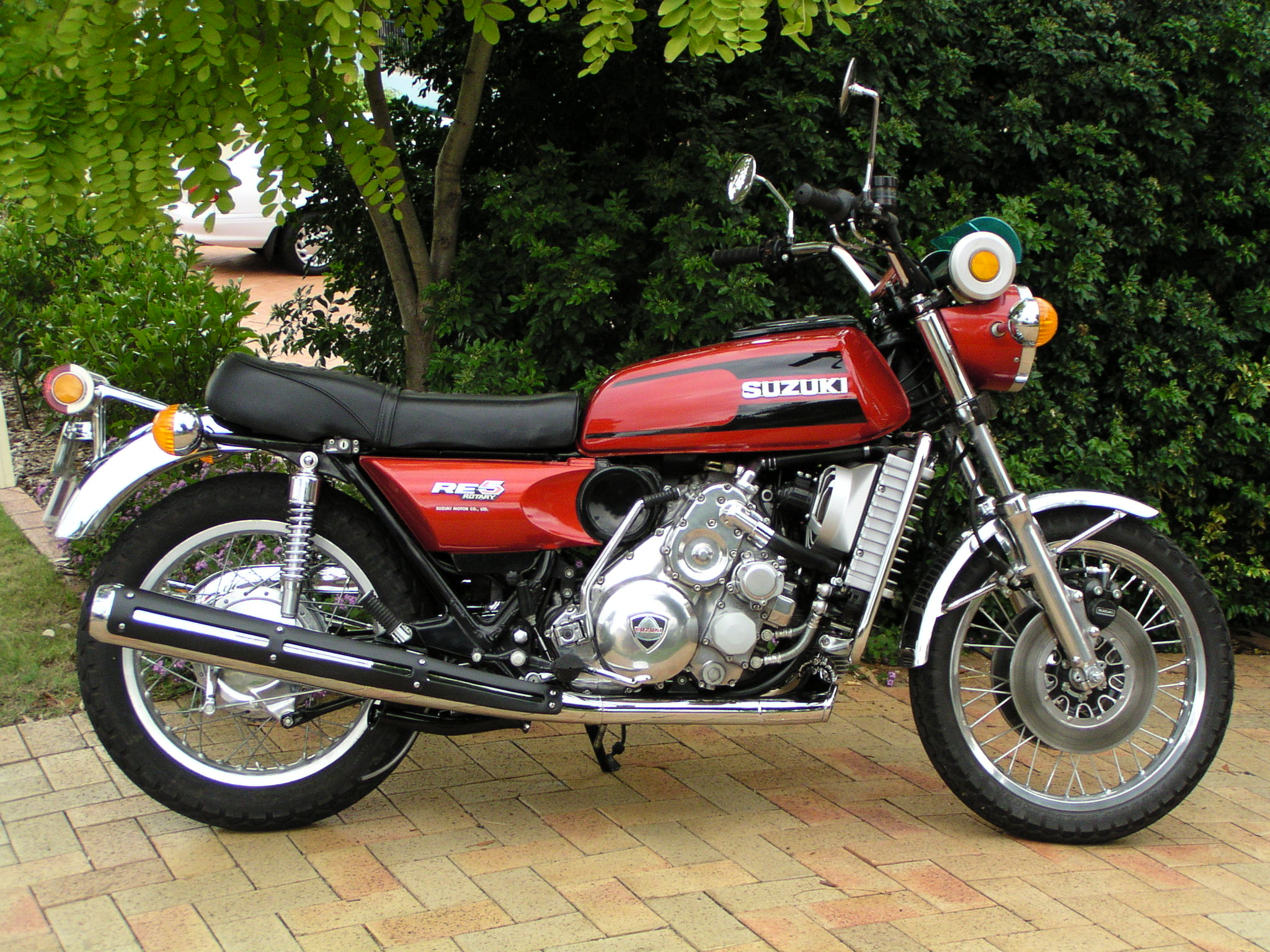
- Suzuki RE5
- Manufacturer: Suzuki
- Production: 1974–1976
- Engine: 497 cc (30.3 cu in) Wankel rotary
- Compression ratio: 9.4:1
- Power: 61.9 hp (46.2 kW) @ 6,500 rpm
- Torque: 55.6 lbf⋅ft (75.4 N⋅m) @ 3,500 rpm
- Ignition type: CDI (incorporating a points system)
- Transmission: 5 speed
- Brakes: Front: twin 290 mm (11 in) discs, single piston floating calipers; Rear: 180 mm (7.1 in) drum
- Wheelbase: 1,500 mm (59 in)
- Dimensions: L: 2,210 mm (87 in); W: 870 mm (34 in)
- Weight: 507 lb (230 kg) (dry); 573 lb (260 kg) (wet)
- Fuel capacity: 17 L (4.5 US gal; 3.7 imp gal)

The Suzuki RE5 is a motorcycle with a liquid-cooled single-rotor Wankel engine, manufactured by Suzuki from 1974 to 1976. Apart from its unusual engine, the RE5 is mostly a conventional roadster, albeit with some peculiar styling details thanks to Italian industrial designer Giorgetto Giugiaro.

== Wankel-engined motorcycles ==
Compared to piston engines, rotary engines are smooth, light, and compact with high power relative to displacement. Although these attributes are highly beneficial to motorcycles, Wankel-engined bikes remain something of a rarity, even though the rotary engine had once been touted as the future of motorcycling.

Suzuki's RE5 was one of the very few Wankel-engined motorcycles ever produced. Other manufacturers whose bikes reached production include: DKW, Norton and Van Veen (who used a derivative of the NSU/Audi engines developed for Citroën). Hercules also produced a motorcycle with a Wankel engine, the Hercules W-2000, that was the first rotary-powered motorcycle.

All four major Japanese manufacturers had prototypes or plans, but only Suzuki's RE5 went into production. Yamaha showed their twin-rotor RZ-201 machine at the Tokyo Motor Show in 1972, while Kawasaki tested a prototype as, allegedly, did Honda.

== History ==
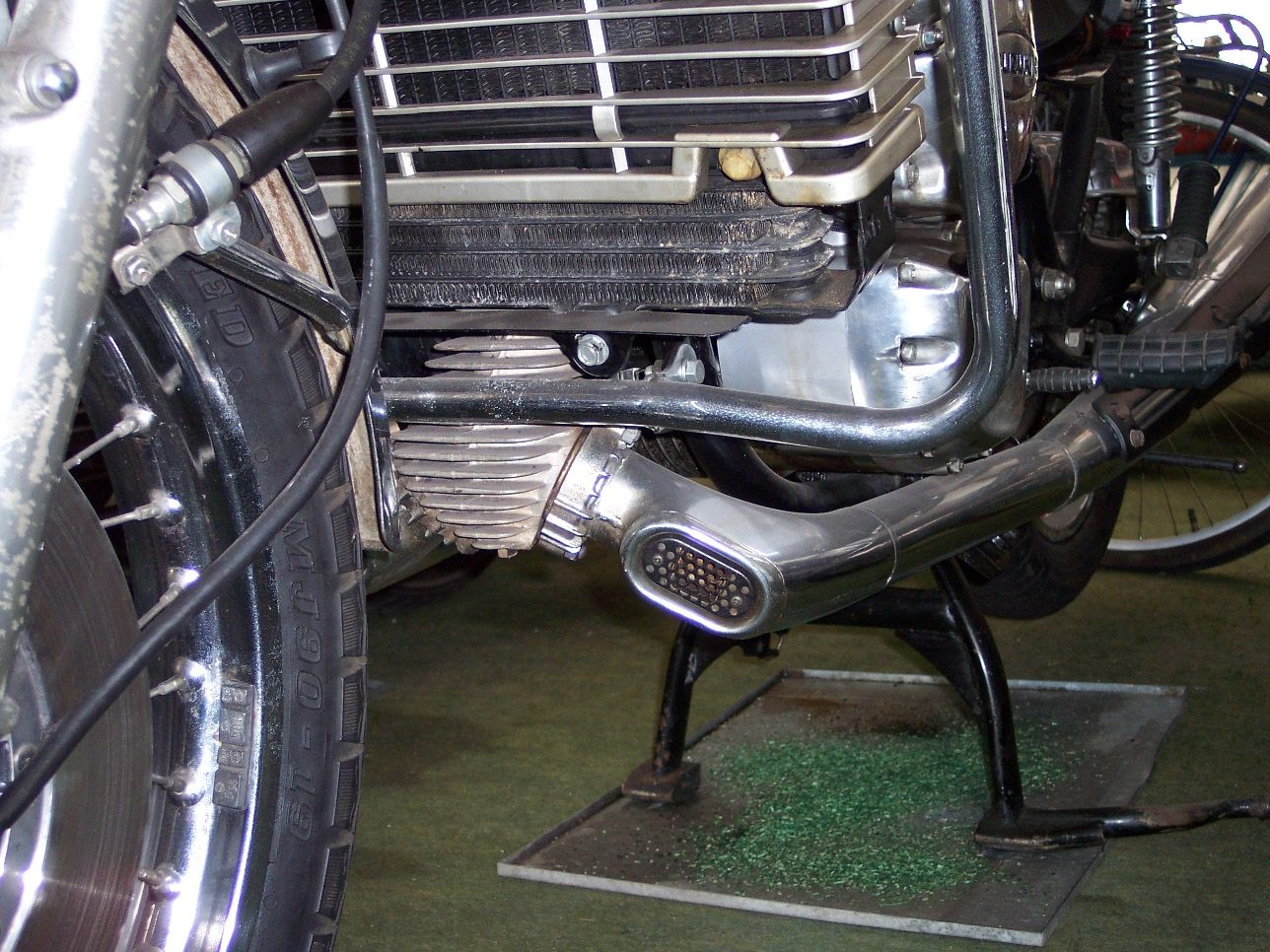
Closeup of the exhaust system cooling fins

RE5 project chief Shigeyasu Kamiya stated that Suzuki had considered a rotary-powered motorcycle in the mid-1960s. Research and development continued till the end of that decade, leading to the signing of a technical licence with NSU in November 1970, Suzuki being the 20th firm to do so. As a pioneer of rotary development, Suzuki engineers designed and produced numerous special machines for the rotary production process. Of these, ten were particularly notable and included the machine to cut the trochoid block. Suzuki holds twenty patents in plating, as considerable research went into the composite electro-chemical materials (CEM) used to plate the rotor housing. Prototypes testing took two years. The bikes were launched in 1974. Suzuki enlisted astronaut Edgar Mitchell, to introduce and endorse the bike. A number of motorcycle publications were given a lavish week-long opportunity for test riding. This RE5's warranty was unusually comprehensive, with a full engine replacement for any engine problem within the first 12 months or 12,000 miles (19,000 km).

Despite having only a single rotor, the RE5's engine was mechanically complex and its numerous subsystems made for a heavy motorcycle. Rotary engines produce a lot of heat, and the RE5 had water- and oil-cooling, and double-skinned exhaust pipes. Ignition was CDI, with two sets of ignition points actuated via vacuum and rpm sensors, to light a solitary NGK spark plug. Three oil reservoirs served the sump, gearbox and total loss tank. Separate oil pumps fed (respectively) the main bearings and the inlet tracts (to lubricate tip seals). The throttle controlled both the primary carburetor butterfly and a second valve in the inlet manifold of the secondary throat (the "port" valve), as well as governing oil supply to the combustion chamber. Five cables in total were moved by the throttle twist grip! The carburetor was similar to that in a rotary-powered car, and was far more complicated than for normal motorcycles.

The RE5 options included: a full touring kit that included a large full fairing (with lockable "glove boxes") and windscreen, two saddlebags, a large rack and lockable top box.

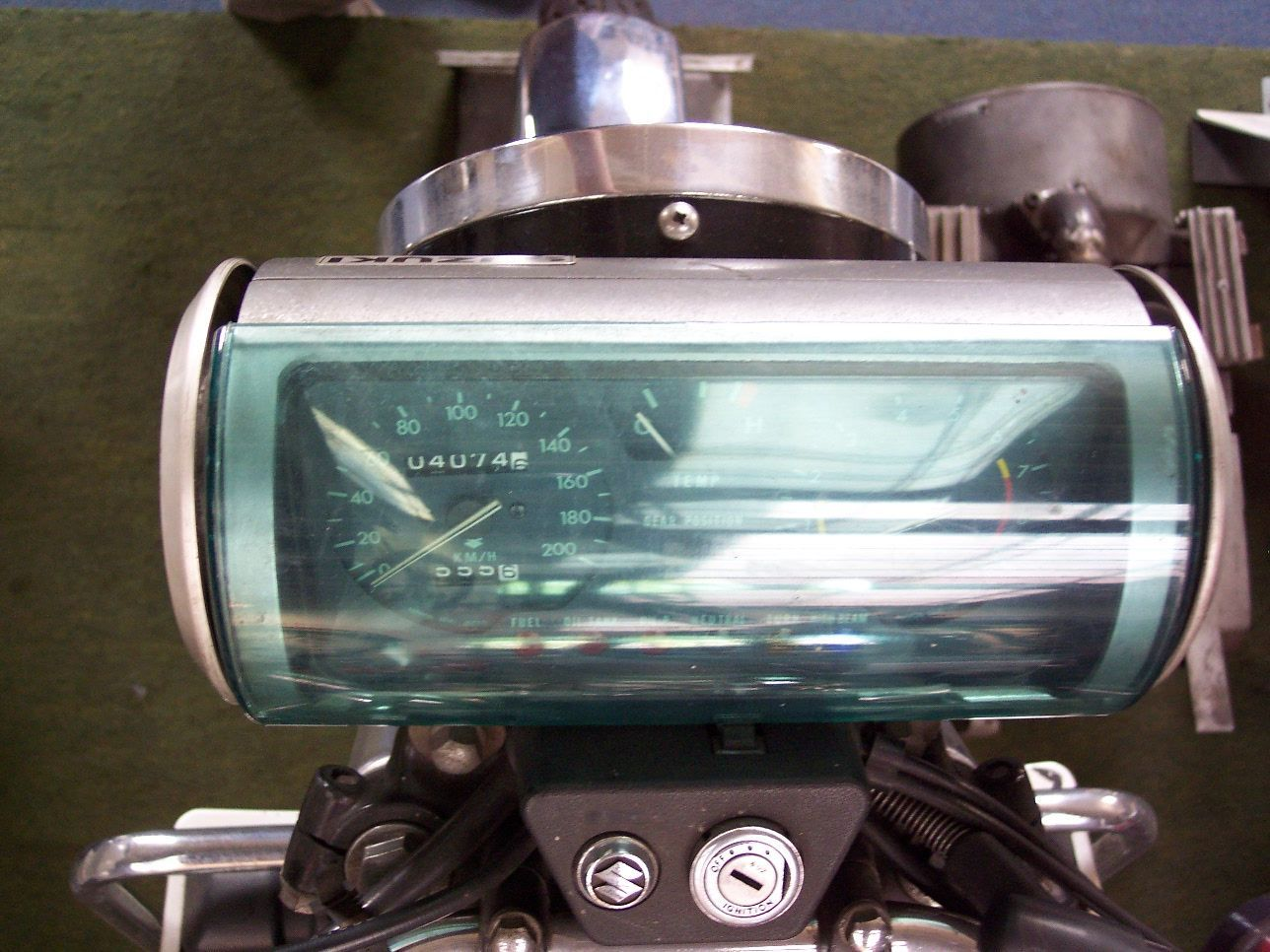
The "tin can" instrument cluster

Suzuki commissioned Italian industrial designer Giorgetto Giugiaro for the RE5 styling. The "tin can" instrument cluster encompassed the usual lights and a low-fuel warning light, total loss oil tank light and digital gear indicator. The tubular "can" motif was also used in the tail light, and spherical indicator lights finished off the "rotary" theme.

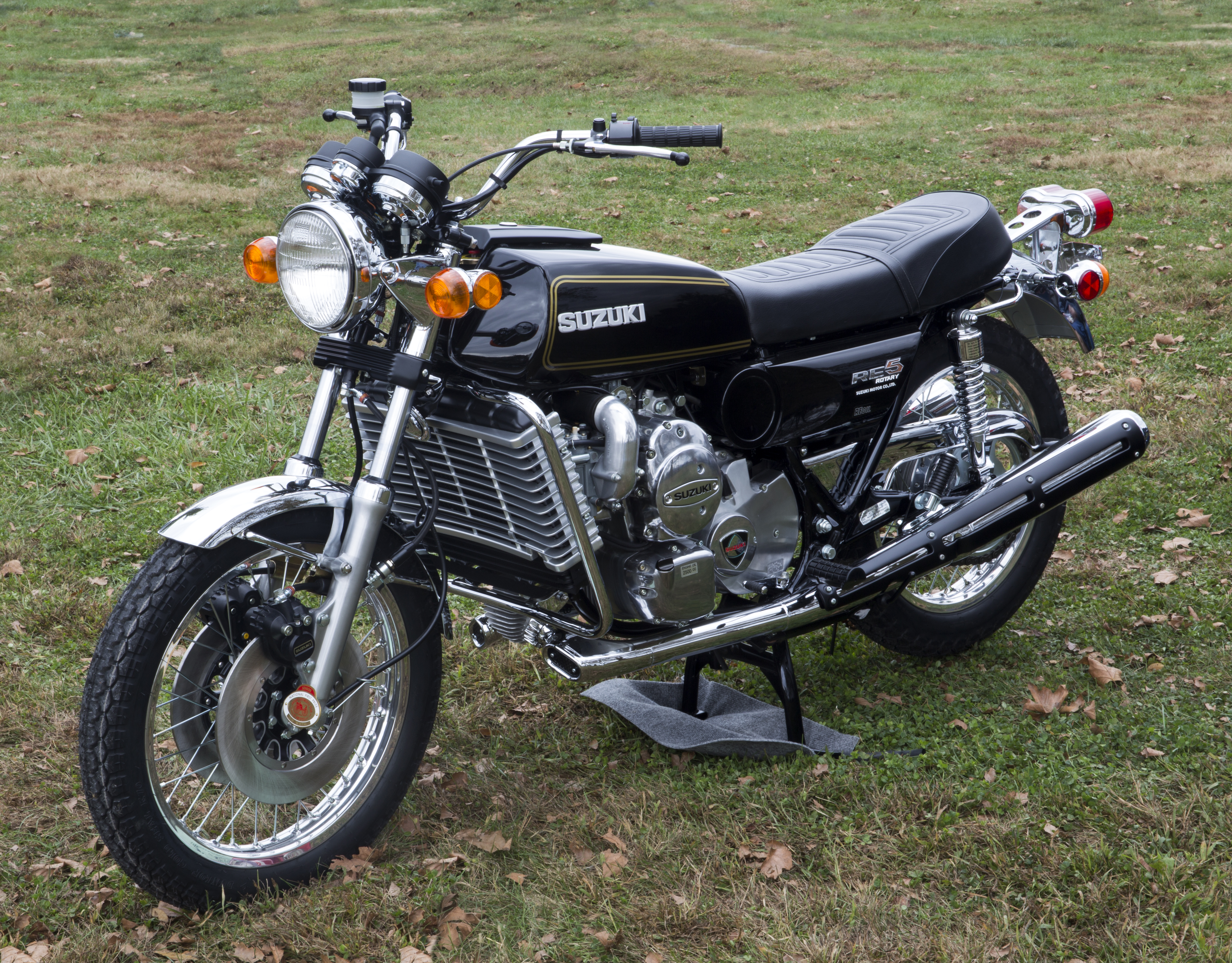
The 1976 RE-5 "A" model, with more traditional styling elements

There were two production models of the RE5, the 1975 M model and the 1976 "A" model, which adopted more conventional styling. Many "A" models were converted M models. The main changes for 1976 included a color changes, GT750-style instruments, blinkers, tail lights and headlight housing. The "B" secondary points for overrun were removed on the "A" model, the chain oiler was removed and a sealed drive chain fitted. By the end of the production run, a total of some 6,000 RE5 machines had been produced.

Although the RE5 was less powerful than the contemporary Suzuki GT750, the engine had excellent torque, and was generally smooth, but it exhibited "grinding vibration" at around 4,000 rpm. Average fuel consumption was 37 mpg_{‑imp} (7.6 L/100 km; 31 mpg_{‑US}), varying between 28.6 mpg_{‑imp} (9.9 L/100 km; 23.8 mpg_{‑US}) and 43.3 mpg_{‑imp} (6.52 L/100 km; 36.1 mpg_{‑US}).

The complex B-point system (explained below) gave smooth running on overrun and some engine braking. Suzuki stopped fitting the B points to the 1976 "A" model, and had dealers disconnect the system on remaining "M" models. The bikes sometimes exhibited a dead spot or hesitation during acceleration as the carburetor transitioned from primary to secondary throat. This was due to poor synchronization between the positions of the primary, port and the secondary carburetor throat valves. Some evidence links this to jetting, giving an excessively lean primary mixture.

== Reception ==
Although the RE5's frame and suspension were conventional, reviewers remarked on its good steering and handling, aided by good ground clearance. Some reviewers even claimed it to be the best-handling Japanese bike, and close to European standards. After the novelty of the RE5's rotary engine had worn off, reviewers found only its handling to be its winning factor over other bikes. In 1985 Cycle World criticised the RE5 as expensive, over-complicated, underpowered, and hideous; and they declared it to be one of "The Ten Worst Motorcycles".

== Differing design approaches ==
The Norton Classic was an air-cooled twin-rotor bike developed by David Garside at BSA, with a fundamentally different design approach. Whereas the RE5 was heavy, overcomplicated, expensive to make, and (at 60 bhp) a little short on power, Garside's design was simpler, smoother, lighter and (at 80 bhp) significantly more powerful.

== Specifications ==
Specifications:

- Wheels: Front 3.25 × 19in, Rear 4.00 × 18in.
- Carburation: two-stage, two-barrel 18–32 mm Mikuni.
- Fuel: 85–95 octane.
- Starting system: Electric, kickstart (the latter intended to be offered only as an option).
- Performance: Top Speed (tested): 168 km/h (104 mph).
- Standing ¼ mile: 14.02 s @ 94.24 mph (151.66 km/h).
- Wheel Base: 1,500 mm (59.1 in).
- Weight (curb with half tank of fuel): 255.4 kg (563 lb).
- Weight dry: 230 kg (507 lb).

Engine geometry:

- Generating radius R = 100 mm
- Eccentricity e = 14 mm
- Equidistance a = 2 mm
- Rotor housing width B = 67 mm
- Chamber displacement V_{k} = 497 cm^{3}
- Compression ratio ε = 9.4

== Technical features ==
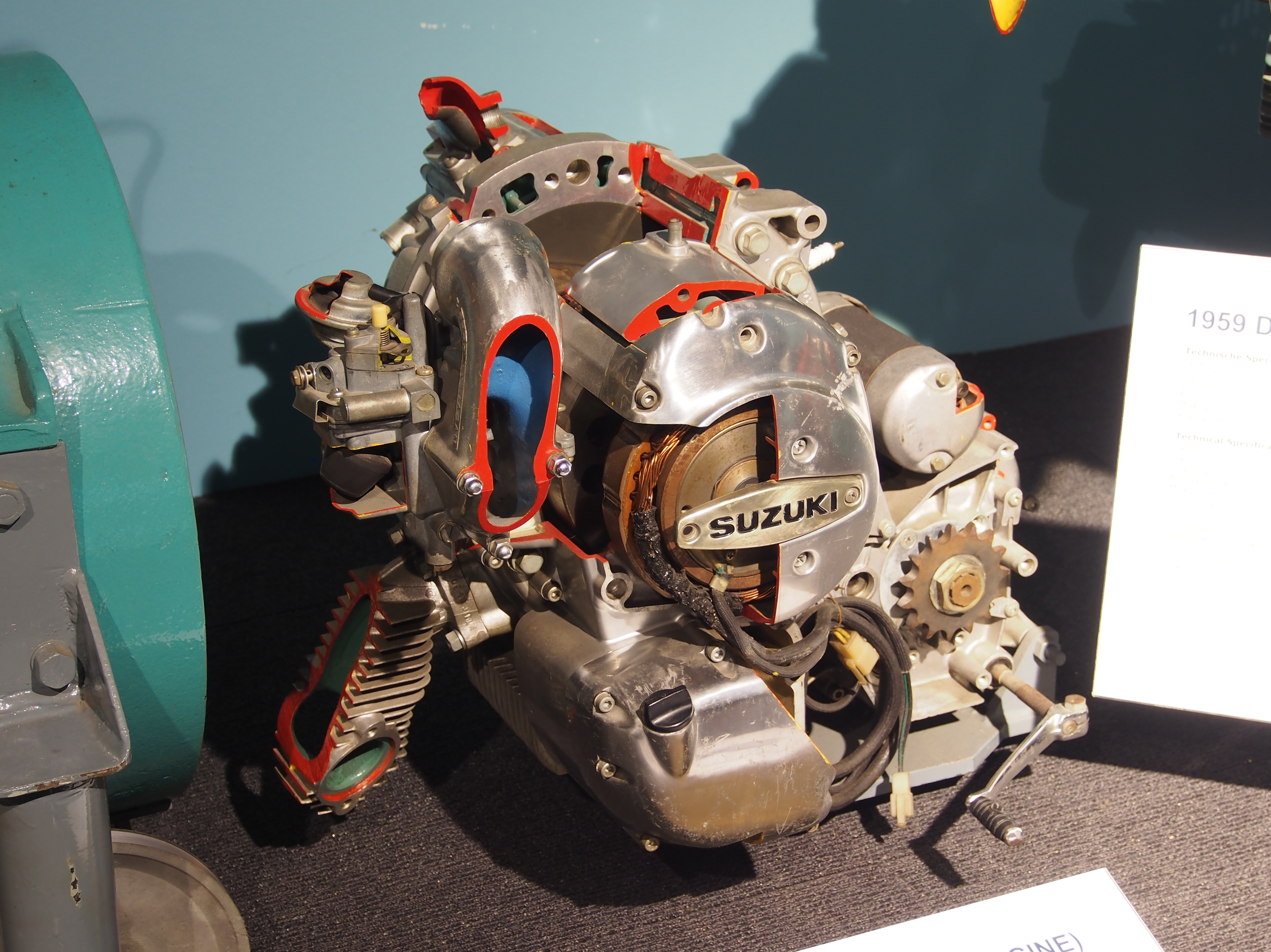
RE5 engine in the Louwman Museum

The engine has a single rotor that spins on an eccentric shaft in a peritrochoid (Mazda uses an epitrochoid) housing. Since the stationary/rotor gears ratio is 2:3, the rotor rotates by 360° every three rotations of the crankshaft. The eccentric shaft runs on plain bearings, which were better than rollers for heat dissipation. Combustion sealing utilised Apex, corner and side seals. At the three rotor apexes, tip sealing was accomplished with a three-piece seal tensioned by a blade spring. Apex seals were made of a special material known as Ferro Tic, which was a combination of sintered ferrous alloy and titanium carbide. The surface of the trochoid chamber which the apex seals rubbed along was coated with a CEM (composite electrochemical material) consisting of nickel silicon carbide. Side sealing used one blade-like seal and spring for each rotor face on each side (six side seals in total). Corner seals and springs finished the isolation of combustion. Blow-by gases are recirculated into the combustion process. The rotor spins backward in relation to the motorcycle. Primary power transfer to the clutch and transmission is by duplex chain.

=== Clutch and gearbox ===
Wet multiplate clutch, and five-speed, constant-mesh, manual. The gearbox is virtually the same as that fitted to Suzuki's GT750 water-cooled triple. RE5 final drive is by 630 chain via a 14-tooth drive sprocket and 43-tooth unit at the rear wheel.

=== Carburetion ===
Carburetion had five separate circuits. Suzuki used peripheral ports for the RE5, as they give better high-speed running but are known to have low-speed issues. This is dealt with by using a two-stage Mikuni carburetor. An 18 mm throat splits into two small peripheral induction tracts. The primary butterfly is directly controlled by one of the five throttle cables, providing smooth low-speed running. A diaphragm controls the secondary carburetor port, and this is activated when a set vacuum is reached in the carburetor circuit. This much larger 32 mm port enters the rotor chamber between and slightly below the two small primary ports. Indirectly involved with carburetion is the unique "port valve". This small butterfly valve pivots in the rotor housing inside the secondary port and is directly controlled by another of the throttle cables. Without the port valve, the long induction tract of the secondary port would fill with traces of exhaust gasses whenever the secondary valve was closed. This occurs as the tip of the rotor passes the induction port at the end of the exhaust cycle before beginning the induction cycle. If this was allowed to happen, when the secondary throat finally opened the engine would first swallow an induction charge contaminated with exhaust gasses causing a momentary misfire and felt as a dead spot or hesitation in acceleration. The port valve is therefore effectively timed to remain closed whenever the secondary carburetor throat is closed, isolating the induction tract from exhaust gasses. Carburetor tuning involves adjusting cables controlling the primary butterfly and the port valve, among other things, illustrated by Suzuki Service Bulletin Nine. The carburetor also incorporated an accelerator pump, which was mechanically actuated at 35 degrees of primary butterfly movement (later changed to 28 degrees) to enrich the fuel mixture during acceleration.

=== Ignition ===
CDI triggered by two sets of points. A basic problem with the rotary engine design is a lack of engine braking, partially due to the mass of the rotor. Leaning of the mixture on overrun also contributes to erratic and "lumpy" running. One way to solve the problem is to shut off ignition entirely on overrun, but this leads to excessive contamination of the combustion chamber by unwanted deposits, which can cause the apex seals to stick. Suzuki opted for a compromise by using two sets of ignition points. One set of points ran on a dual lobe cam for normal operation, firing the rotor every face. The other set ran on a single cam on the same shaft for triggering the spark plug on overrun. The second set (the B points) were triggered by an rpm sensor (the speed relay) and a vacuum switch, which meant that they worked on engine deceleration (high vacuum) and above 1,700 rpm. This system fired the rotor every second face. This kept the combustion chambers relatively clean. It also served to smooth the lumpy feel of the bike as RPM reduced on overrun and addressed some issues with backfiring (more correctly, "afterfiring"). Engine braking is also significantly improved. The B point system was discontinued on the "A". It is believed that the factory also employed mechanics to visit dealerships and disconnect the B points on any "M" (1975) models still in the showrooms. Suzuki toyed with the idea of two plugs like the Mazda's, but as with so much of their engineering on this bike, overthought the application, believing that they would require two plugs of different heat ranges. The idea was dropped, and the bike shipped with a single 18 mm conical seat gold palladium spark plug housed in a copper insert in the rotor housing (NGK A9EFV).

=== Cooling ===
The rotary engine places severe thermal stresses on its cases, as two sides of rotor are constantly exposed to high ignition and exhaust temperatures, while the third side inducts cool fuel/air mixture. To cope with this, and probably capitalizing on their previous experience with water cooling, Suzuki opted for a liquid-cooled engine using two separate systems. Oil is used to lubricate and cool the internals of the rotor and water-cooled the external jacketing. Oil is fed from an engine sump by a trochoid pump at around 100 psi (690 kPa). The oil is then circulated through an oil cooler mounted across the frame and below the radiator. A pressure regulator also acts as a bypass in case of a blockage in the cooler. A centrifugal pump sends coolant around the external rotor jacketing but via an intricate path in an attempt to even out the massive thermal stresses. Liquid enters at the point of highest temperatures (ignition), passing from the right side to the left, and then makes a 180° turn, returning to the right side and passing near the exhaust port. Most of the coolant is then routed to the very large radiator that sits across the frame in front of the bike. Some of the coolant that was not directed to the radiator is now sent around the inlet port and the left side housing. Its passage is once again reversed before flowing to the radiator. The water cooling is thermostatically controlled, and a shrouded fan on the right side of the radiator takes care of excessive temperatures, switching on at 106 °C (223 °F) and cutting when the temperature falls below 100 °C (212 °F).

=== Lubrication ===
Internally the rotor is cooled and lubricated by engine sump oil and the aforementioned trochoid pump. Engine oil is filtered by an easily accessible car-type oil filter on the lower right side of the cases. The filter includes an internal bypass valve in case of blockage. Further lubrication specifically for the tip, corner and side seals is provided by oil from a tank located under the seat. An engine-driven metering pump sends oil from this external tank into the carburetor at a ratio of around 100:1. Metering of the oil quantity is mechanically controlled by cables from the throttle grip. The metering pump also provided lubrication for the final drive chain. A second line is routed from the metering pump and around the bike, ending just above the drive chain behind the sprocket cover. This feature was also disconnected on the "A" models by a simple blanking plug at the metering pump. The gearbox is separated from the engine sump and has its own oil supply. Suzuki marketed its own brand of rotary oil but also approved at least two other oils for use in its rotary engine. Shell Super 10-20-50 and Castrol GTX were both endorsed lubricants.

=== Exhaust ===
Rotary exhaust temperatures reach 927 °C (1,700 °F), and as such, on a motorcycle, required a specialized exhaust system. Suzuki dealt with the problem by first exhausting into a large, heavily finned manifold which split the single exhaust into two streams. They then built two twin-shelled exhaust pipes which included air cooling ducts. Each muffler contains a stainless steel inner pipe which is a little shorter than the length of the external shell. The internal pipe ends in a removable stinger drilled with numerous holes and wrapped in a fibreglass-like material. The stinger (or spark arrestor as Suzuki calls it) exits the exhaust system at the end of the external shell. At the front of each pipe was a small forward-facing grille which allowed cool ambient air to be forced into the pipe by the bike's forward motion and to travel the length of the exhaust between the internal and external pipes. It then flowed through the holes drilled in the stinger, mixing with the hot exhaust gasses before exiting the system. Even so, Suzuki found it prudent to fit heat shields on the outside of the pipe to further protect riders and pillions. The bike's sound is unique among its two- and four-stroke contemporaries but also quite loud. Early in production (December 1974, Frame #11901), Suzuki reduced the size of the spark arrestor tubes, which both reduced noise and horsepower, but the RE5 exhaust note remains distinctive.

== See also ==
- List of motorcycles by type of engine
