= Hercules W-2000 =

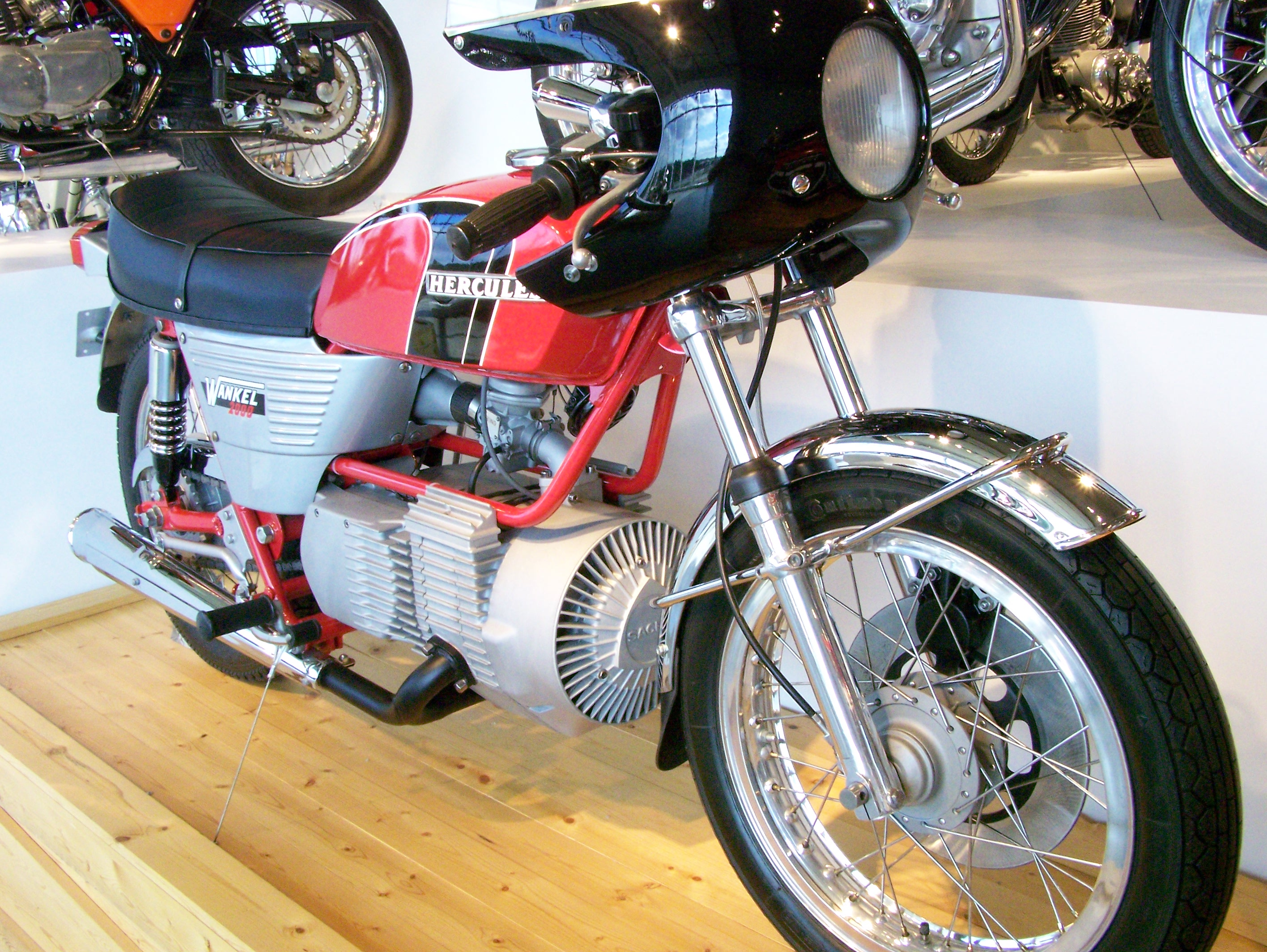
- Manufacturer: Hercules (DKW in some markets)
- Production: 1974–1977
- Engine: Air-cooled 294 cc Wankel
- Compression ratio: 8.5:1
- Top speed: 140 km/h (90 mph)
- Power: 27–32 hp (20–24 kW) @ 6,500 RPM (claimed)
- Torque: 24.5 lb⋅ft (33.2 N⋅m) @ 4,500 RPM
- Transmission: Six-speed, wet clutch, chain drive
- Suspension: Telescopic fork
- Brakes: Front: 11.8 in (300 mm) disc Rear: 7.0 in (180 mm) drum
- Wheelbase: 54.5 in (1,380 mm)
- Seat height: 30 in (760 mm)
- Weight: 381 pounds (173 kg) (dry); 390 pounds (180 kg) (fuel half full) (wet)
- Fuel capacity: 4.5 US gal (17 L; 3.7 imp gal)
- Oil capacity: 4.0 US pt (1.9 L; 3.3 imp pt)
- Fuel consumption: 40 mpg_{‑US} (5.9 L/100 km; 48 mpg_{‑imp})

The Hercules W-2000 is a motorcycle which was made by Hercules in Germany. It was the first production motorcycle with a Wankel engine. (Note: The Suzuki RE5 was sold in the United States first.)

It was designed in the late 1960s, first shown at a German trade show (Internationale Fahrrad und Motorrad-Ausstellung IFMA - the International Bicycle and Motorcycle show) in 1970; the prototype had a Sachs KM-914 engine and a BMW 250 gearbox and shaft transmission; production started in 1974. Production halted in 1977 after 1,800 were built, sales were 40 units (a month) under the profit threshold. The tooling was sold to Norton Motors.

== Development ==
Fichtel & Sachs, which became Hercules's parent company, was the second licensee of the Wankel engine, on Dec 29, 1960, and Sachs was the first motorcycle manufacturer with a license. Sachs had prior experience with Wankel applications in personal watercraft and power tools. The 1970 Hercules motorcycle prototype had shaft drive. It may be on display in the Motorcycle Museum which is part of the Zentrum Industriekultur in Nuremberg.

== Specifications ==
Information in the specifications box are from Cycle World unless noted. The Hercules Wankel Interessengemeinschaft says a low 5.8 litres per 100 kilometres (49 mpg_{‑imp}; 41 mpg_{‑US}) and 8.5 litres per 100 kilometres (33 mpg_{‑imp}; 28 mpg_{‑US}) at the high end. Das Motorrad (13/1975) claims an average 7.2 litres per 100 kilometres (39 mpg_{‑imp}; 33 mpg_{‑US}).

=== Engine ===
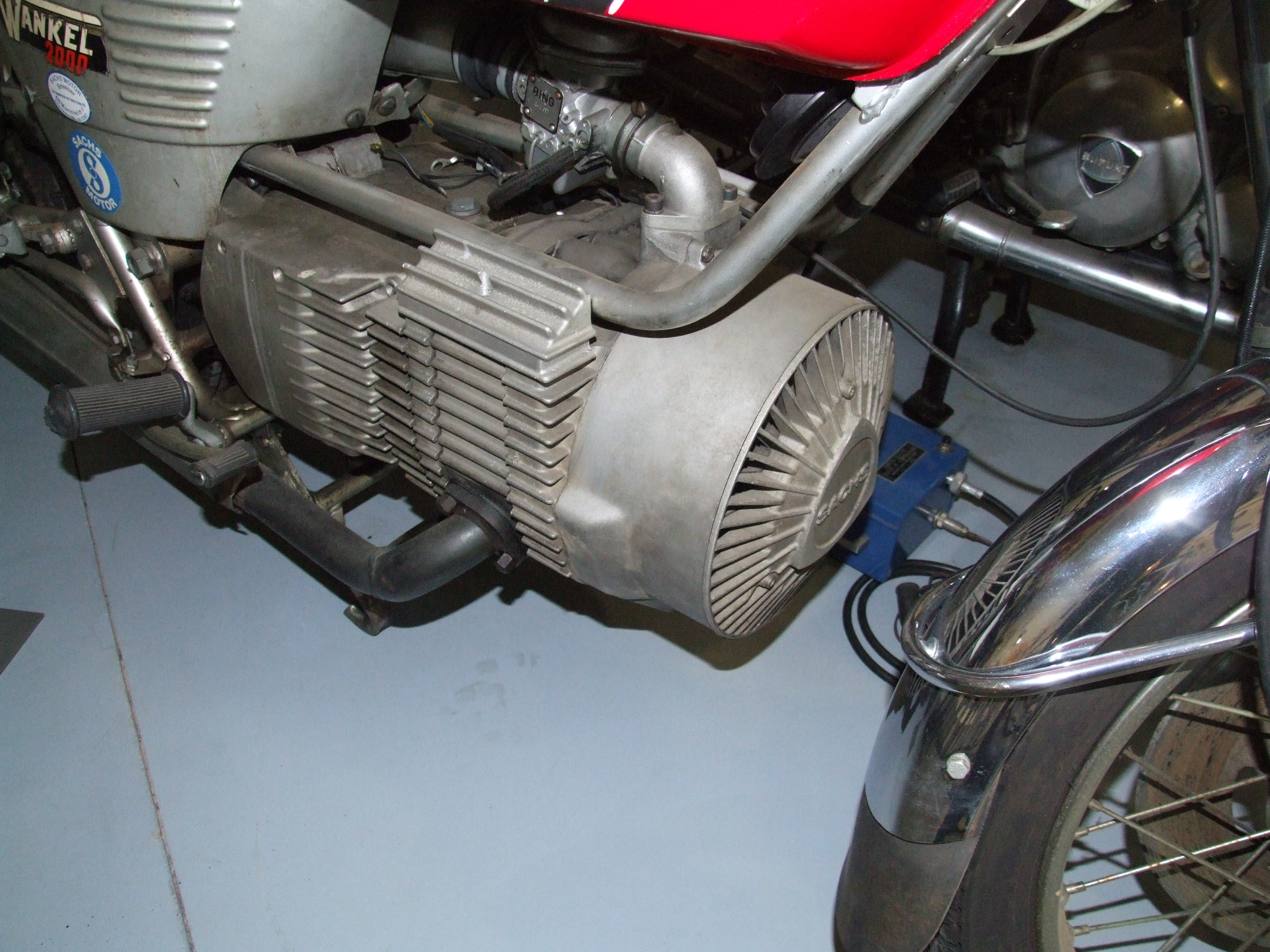
Closeup of W-2000 engine at Museum Autovision

The engine was an air-cooled single-rotor Wankel designed by Sachs as a snowmobile engine, that produced 27–32 hp (20–24 kW) at 6,500 RPM. The rotor spun about the frame's longitudinal axis (see longitudinal engine for the piston-engine equivalent), with power taken to the transmission through a 90° bevel gear.

Fuel was originally supplied through a 32 mm Bing carburetor. An electric starter with backup kick starter was standard.

Gasoline had to be premixed with two-stroke oil until 1976, when 199 more units were produced with automatic lubrication.

== Reception and legacy ==
A contemporary Cycle World review summarized the machine this way: "Less performance for more money takes this rotary out of the realm of practicality." It received criticism for insufficient ground clearance and unimpressive acceleration.

A Rider retrospective written in 2015 called it an "exercise in simplicity, with clean, spare design that projects industrial efficiency", especially in contrast to the overbuilt Suzuki RE5, while noting both rotary powered machines are "'orphan bikes'...innovative but not commercially successful." Another 2008 retrospective noted the high insurance costs (due to erroneous swept volume calculation ranking it with high-risk literbikes) and said "Every buyer with an ounce of common-sense, or logic, avoided the Hercules like the plague and the bike sold only to real biking geeks who delighted in the absurdly quirky."

=== In collections ===
Besides the Motorcycle Museum in Nuremberg, examples are in collections at:

- The Deutsches Museum in Munich, Germany
- Deutsches Zweirad- und NSU-Museum in Neckarsulm, Germany
- Museum Autovision in Altlußheim, Germany
- Barber Vintage Motorsports Museum in Birmingham, Alabama
- The Ontario Science Centre in Toronto, Canada
- Motorcyclepedia Museum in Newburgh, New York
- National Motorcycle Museum in Anamosa, Iowa
- George Taylor's Vintage Motorcycle Collection in Grasmere, New South Wales, Australia.
- Lane Motor Museum in Nashville, Tennessee
- The Sammy Miller Motorcycle Museum in New Milton, Hampshire
- The Motorcycle Museum of Iceland in Akureyri, Iceland

== See also ==
- List of motorcycles by type of engine
