= Wenkel =

Wenkel is a German surname. Notable people with the surname include:

- Max Wenkel (1864–1943), German automobile pioneer and inventor
- Ortrun Wenkel (1942–2025), German operatic contralto

== See also ==
- Wankel
- Wenzel
