= Motorcyclepedia =

Coordinates: 41.49373°N 74.03174°W

- Established: April 16, 2011
- Location: Newburgh, New York
- Type: Transport museum
- Collection size: 500+ motorcycles
- Directors: Gerald A. Doering and Ted Doering
- Website: motorcyclepediamuseum.org

Motorcyclepedia is a motorcycle museum containing over 600 mostly American motorcycles, mainly from the first half of the 20th century, with a special emphasis on Indian motorcycles, including a model from every year of the original Indian brand on display, covering 1901 to 1953.

The 85,000-square-foot (7,900 m^{2}) non-profit museum was opened by Gerald A. Doering and his son Ted Doering on April 16, 2011, at 250 Lake Street, in Newburgh, New York. Housed on two floors of the old Miron building, it is divided into galleries dedicated to motorcycles and memorabilia from the time periods represented; including an 1897 De Dion-Bouton trike, a 1901 Thomas, and the marques Reading Standard, Yale, Pope, Thor, and many others.

== Indian motorcycle gallery ==
The museum features over 100 Indian motorcycles, including an Indian Papoose, a 1914 Hendee Special, an Indian Ace, an M-1 Military Prototype and a timeline of Indian Motorcycles from 1901 to 1953.

== Chopper City ==
This gallery features over 30 choppers. Some of the notable choppers include Ed Roth's Mail Box, Arlen Ness's Taxi and Ron Ebert's Bubble Machine, and replicas of the choppers from Easy Rider.

== Police and military galleries ==
The Police Gallery features police motorcycles from the City of Newburgh, New York and Town of New Windsor, New York. Also featured is one of thirteen Harley-Davidson FL Police motorcycles that were used in the motorcade of President John F. Kennedy on the day he was assassinated, FLH Police Harley-Davidson that was used in a motorcade of President Richard Nixon, and a 1910 Sheriff's Harley-Davidson. The Military Gallery features Army Harley-Davidson's, an Army Indian, and a Kettenkrad from World War II.

== Circa, American and scooter galleries ==
The Circa Timeline section features motorcycles manufactured prior to 1930 including a De Dion-Bouton trike, Thomas, Reading Standard, Yale, Pope, Thor, Henderson, and Flying Merkel. This gallery includes and a large collection of Ace motorcycles. The American Gallery features over 50 different Harley-Davidson models, some of the highlights included are a sidecar that was specially constructed for James Patrick Harley, 1965 FLH Electra Glide Period Custom, and 1905 Single. Highlights in the Scooter Gallery include a Vespa with sidecar, Monark, Ner-a-Car, and Cushman.

== Motordrome ==
The museum has two fully constructed motordromes, or Wall of Death, which were imported from Germany. These motordromes are fully operational and operated for special events. The motordromes have been dismantled and put into storage as of November 2020. The museum rents the space to film and TV productions.

== Antique Motorcycle Club of America ==
The museum maintains a gallery to exhibit members' motorcycles. The exhibit is called Fast from the Past: Competition Motorcycles of Yesteryear. This exhibit is broken into categories of racers; boardtrack, dirt track, hillclimber, road racing, drag racing, land speed, motocross, endurance and observed trials. This exhibit will be on until Summer 2012. All of these motorcycles are on loan from Antique Motorcycle Club of America members. The Antique Motorcycle Foundation mascot motorcycle, a Torque Four, is also on display.

== Charter and educational programs ==
The museum has received a provisional charter from the Board of Regents of the University of the State of New York. The museum hosts Motorcycle Training Solutions, Inc., which provides a basic motorcycle rider course to New York State residents. The core curriculum is 15 1/2 hours
