= Museum Autovision =

Automobile museum in Germany

Coordinates: 49°17′53″N 8°30′23″E

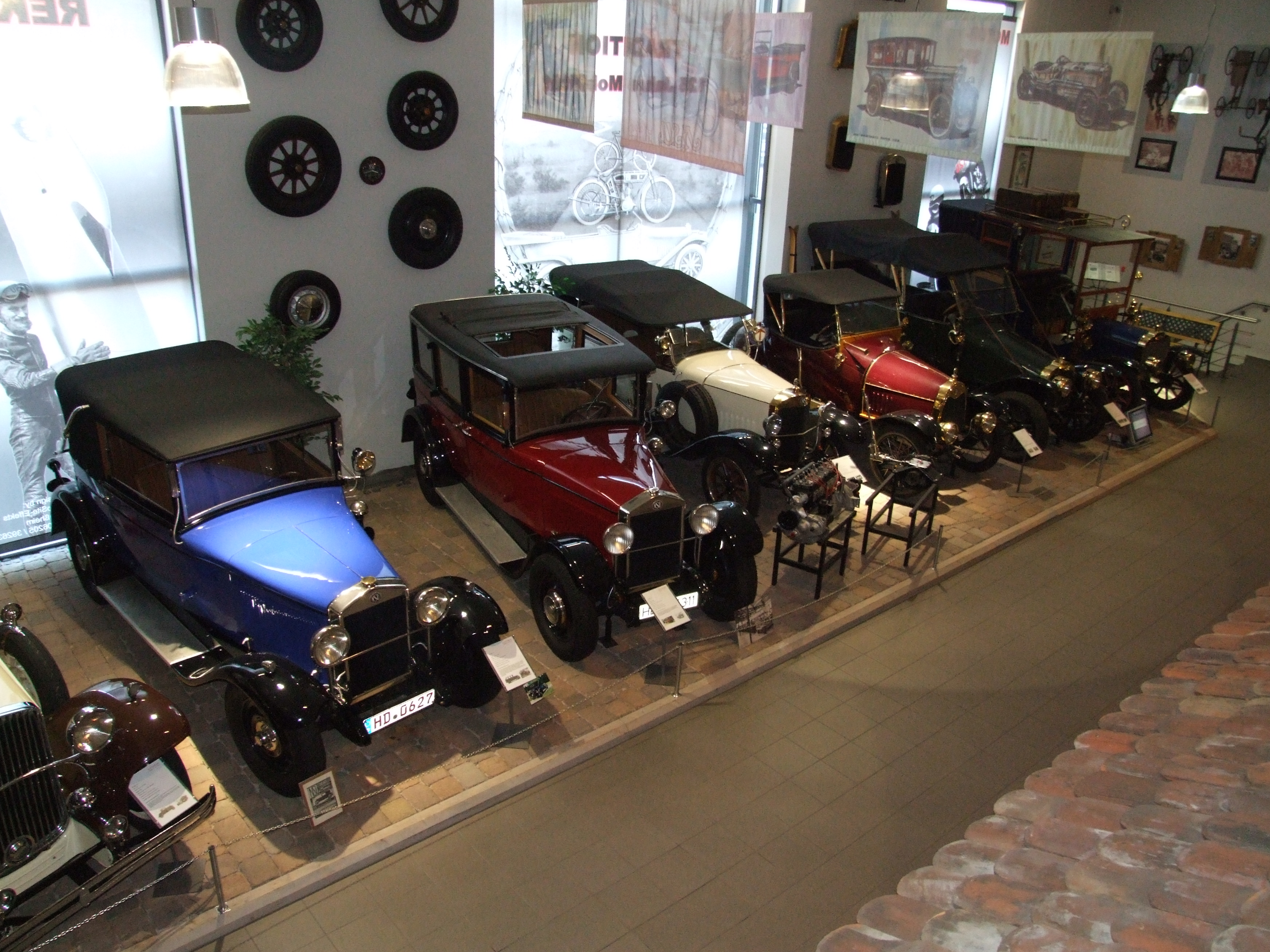
NSU-Oldtimer shown in Museum Autovision

Museum Autovision, Altlußheim, Baden-Württemberg

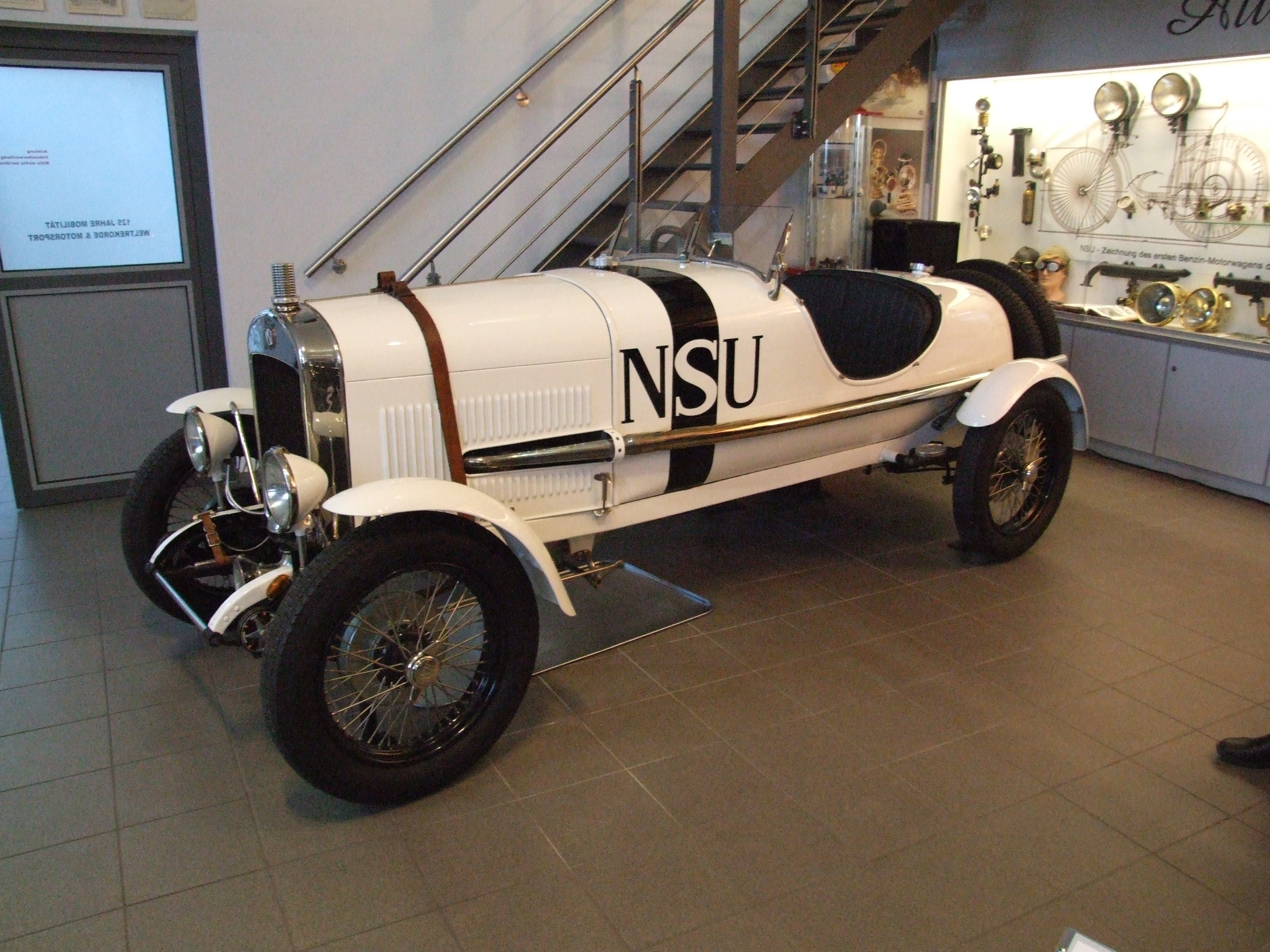
NSU Typ 5/25

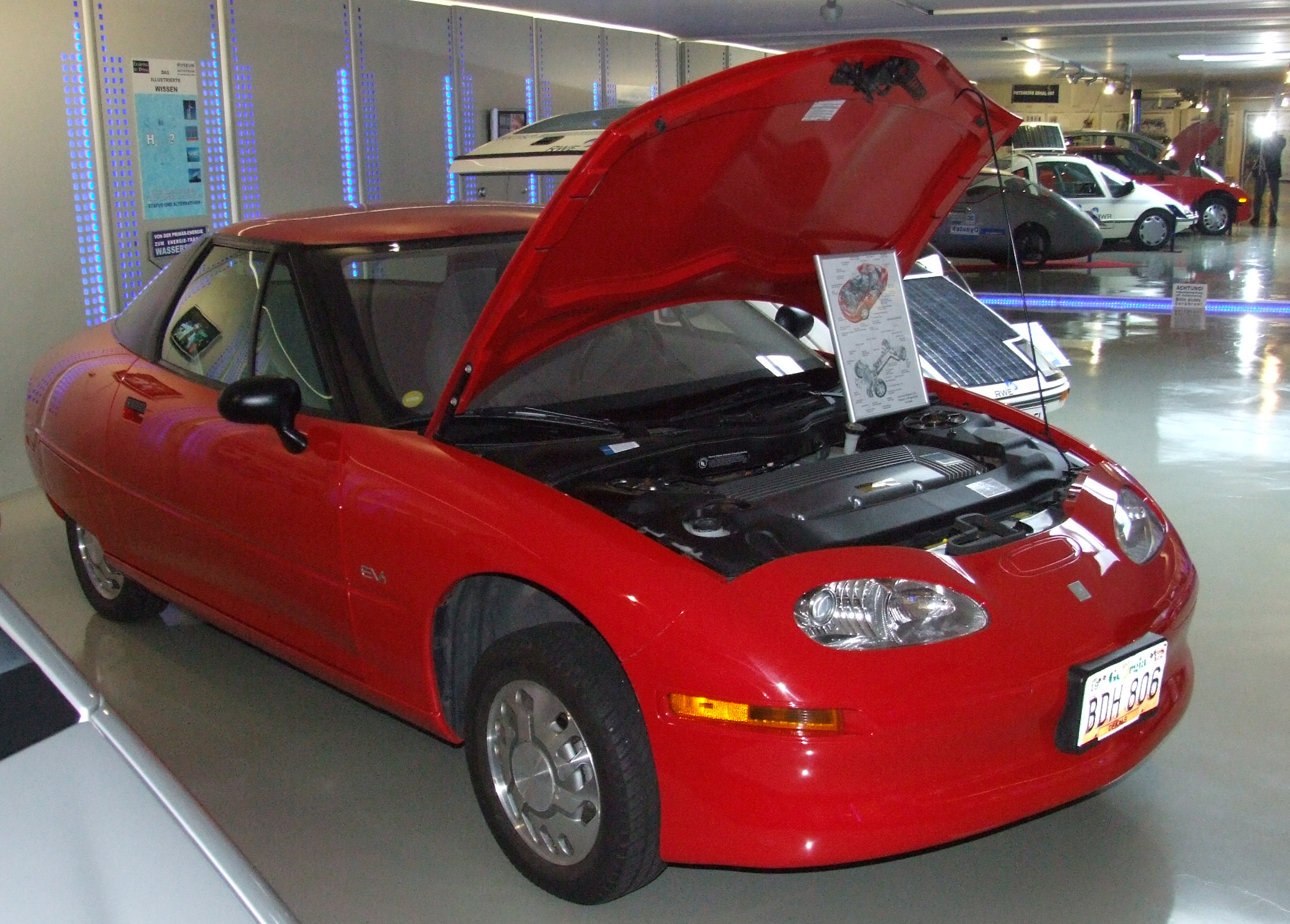
General Motors EV1 in 2008

Museum Autovision is a museum for cars, motorcycles, bicycles in Altlußheim, a small town in Baden-Württemberg, Germany.

The museum specializes in vehicles built by NSU Motorenwerke AG, and in alternative propulsion. The exhibits include the original equipment from an NSU workshop from the 1920s. The museum also has a display of more than 80 Wankel engines; on display are also a dozen cars and three bicycles with Wankel engines. This also includes a cut-away model of the NSU Ro 80.

For owners of electric cars a solar-supported charging station is maintained. One of the few surviving General Motors EV1 was on display in October 2008.

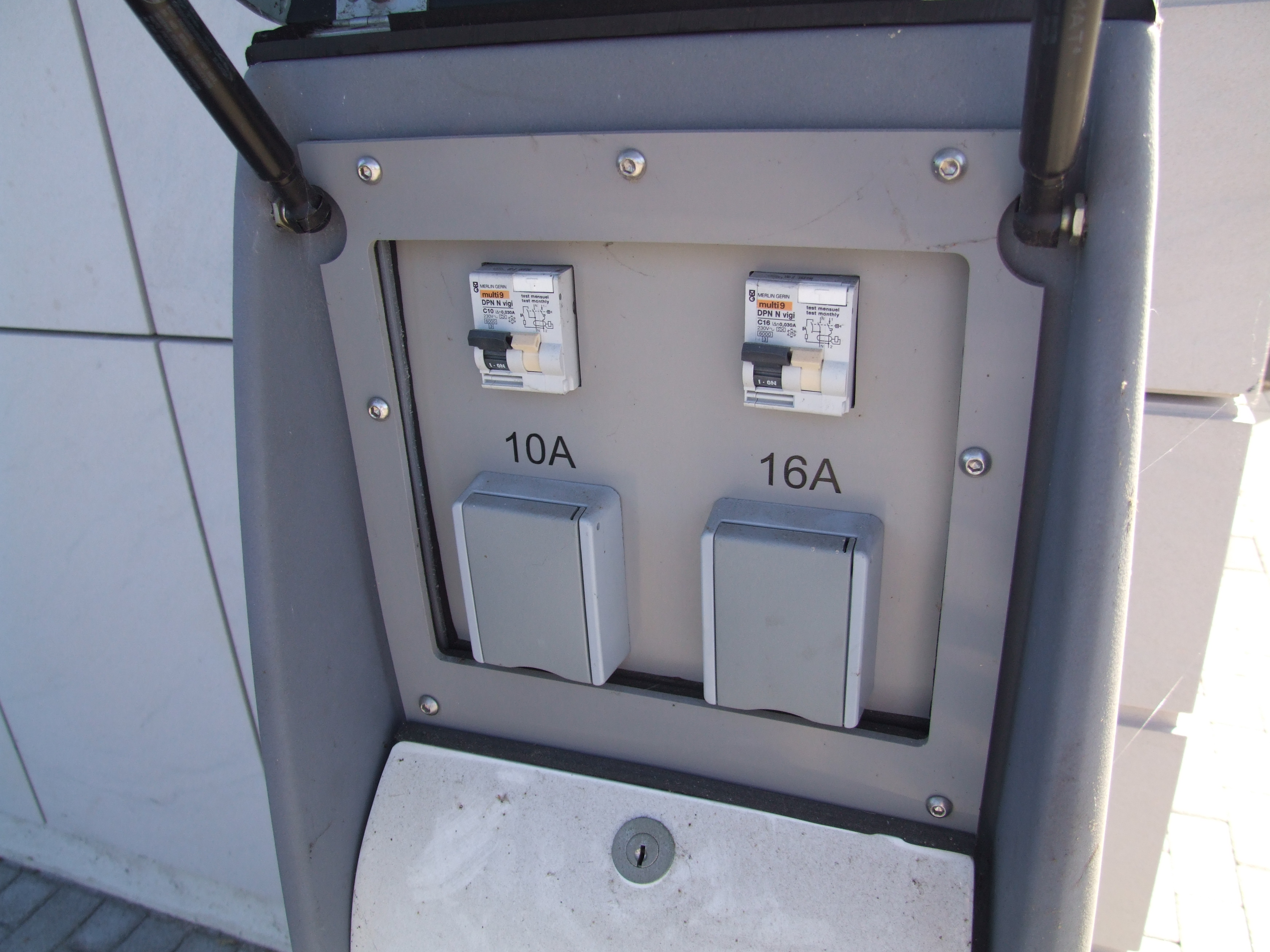
Solar-supported charging station with 10 and 16-Ampere Schuko sockets

== Science arena ==
The museum also has metal models that allow car parts such as engine, automatic transmission and differential to be traced, and metal models on power transfer. Finally, boxes are available for scientific experiments with prepared topics. There are about 50 moveable models that allow visitors to conduct interactive physics experiments under real conditions. Topics include:

- Mechanics
- Caloric theory (Calorifics)
- Optics and acoustics
- Magnetism
- Electricity
- Electrochemistry.

== Exhibits ==
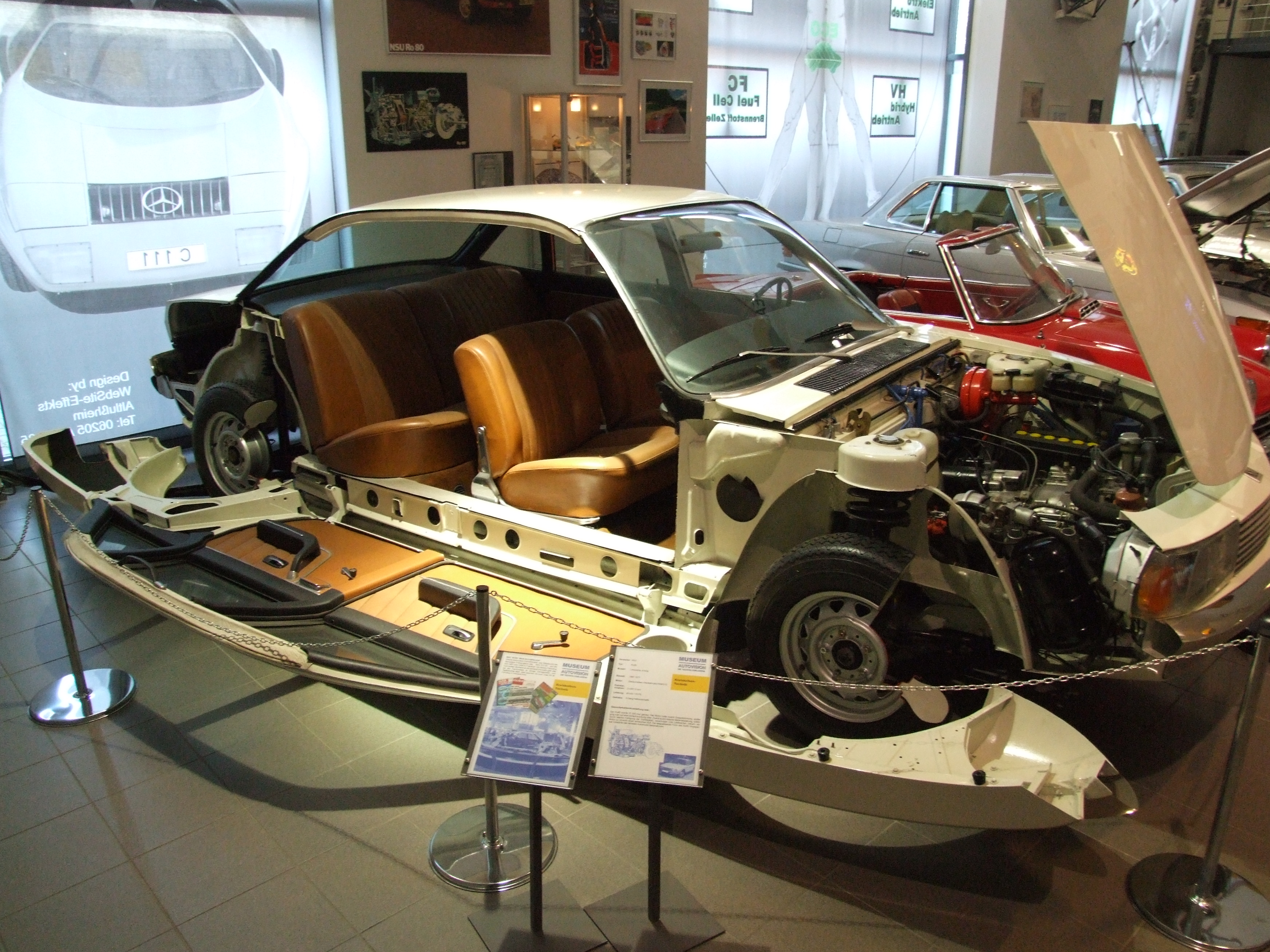
cutaway model of NSU Ro 80, made for IAA

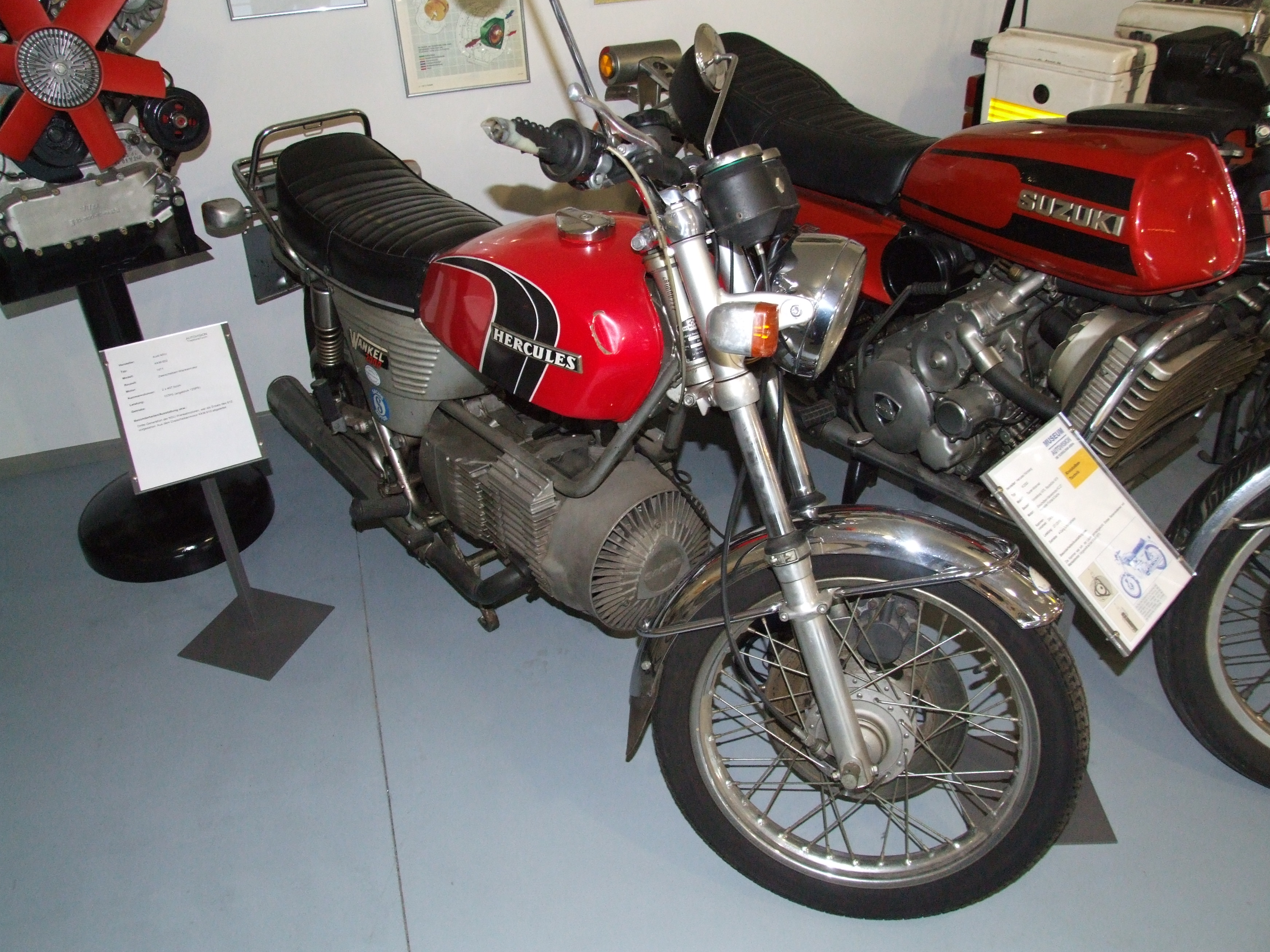
Hercules Wankel 2000

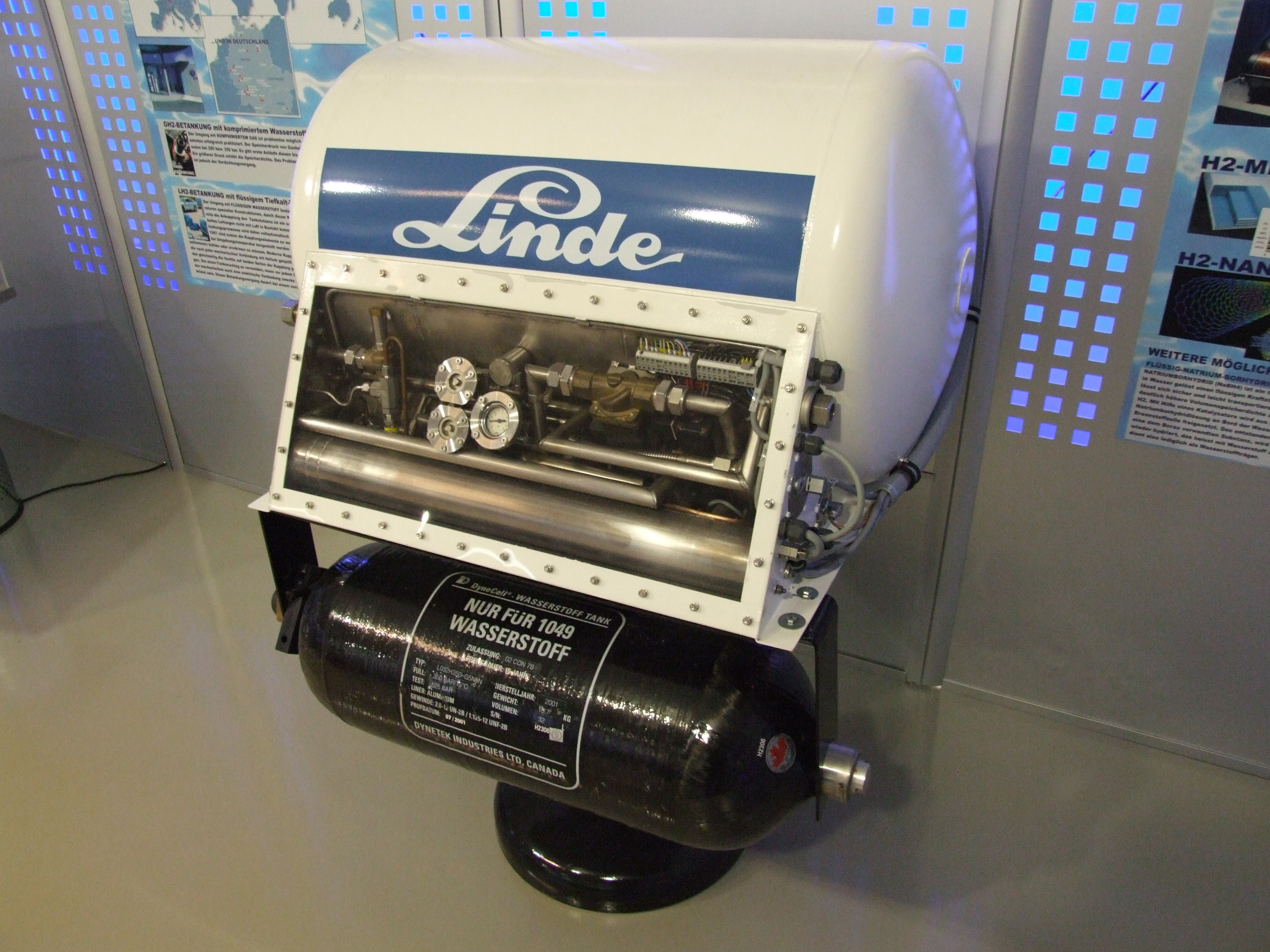
Linde- tank for liquid H2

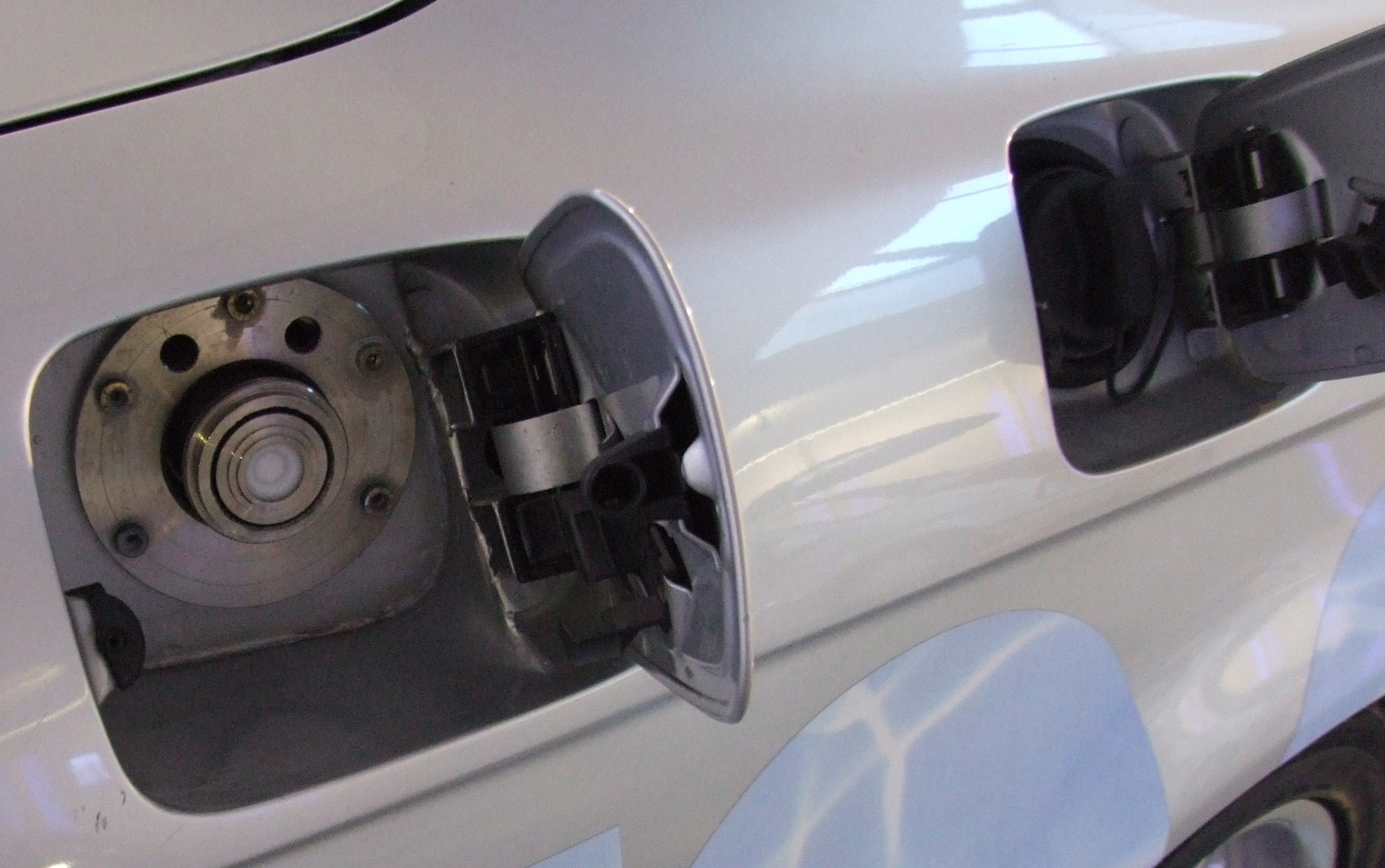
filler neck for hydrogen of a BMW 7

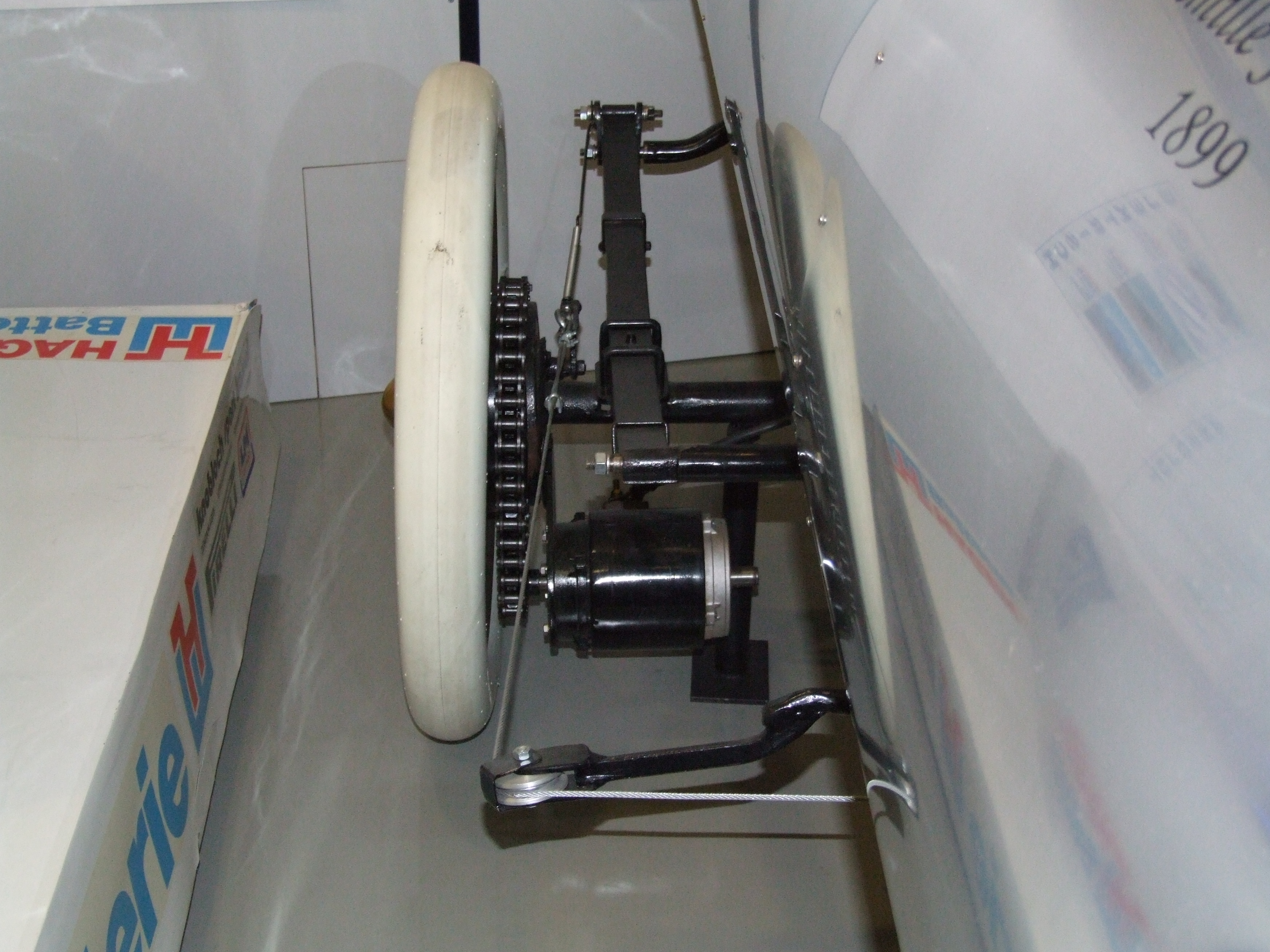
motor of La Jamais Contente

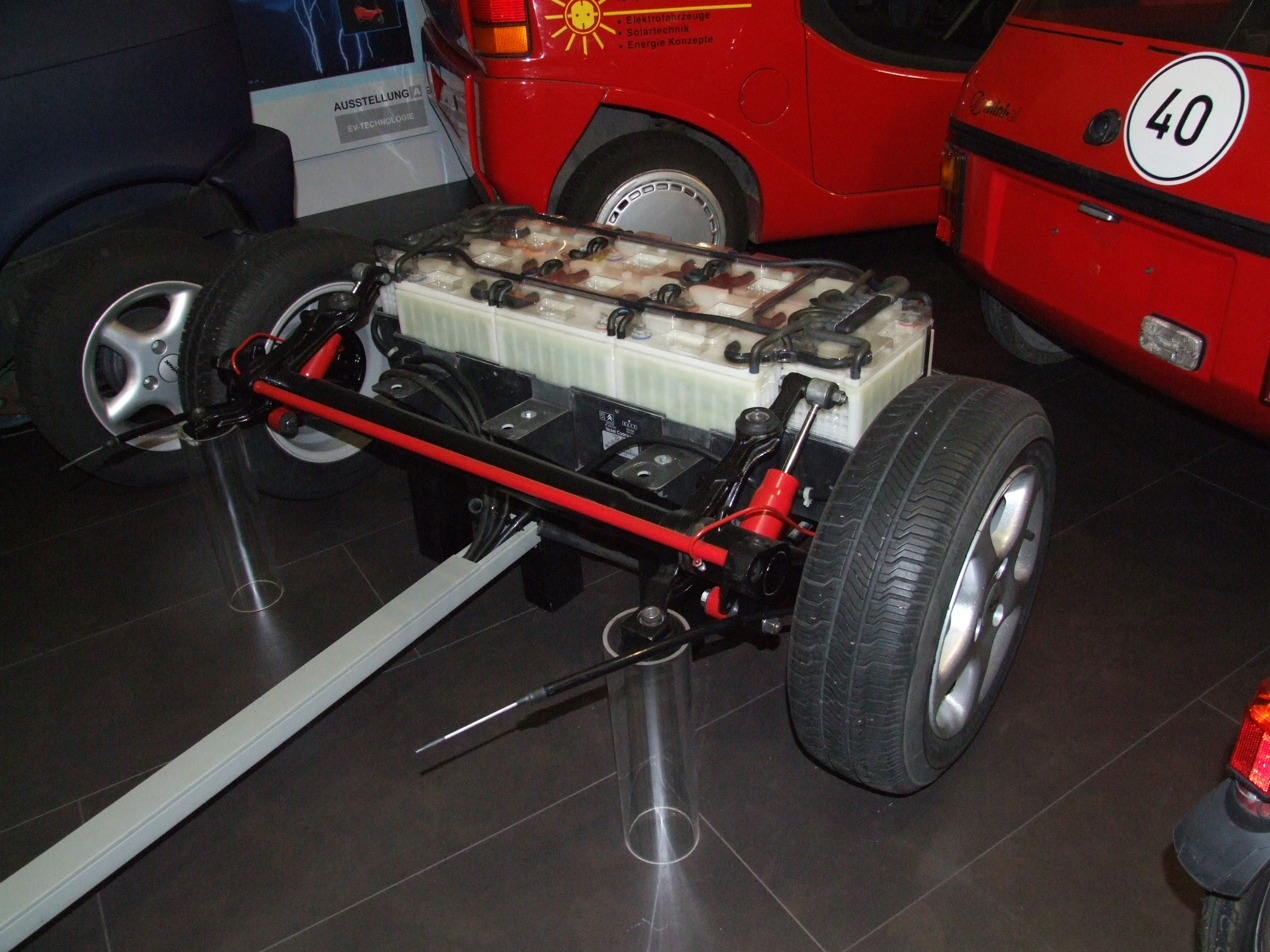
Nickel-cadmium battery of a Peugeot electric car

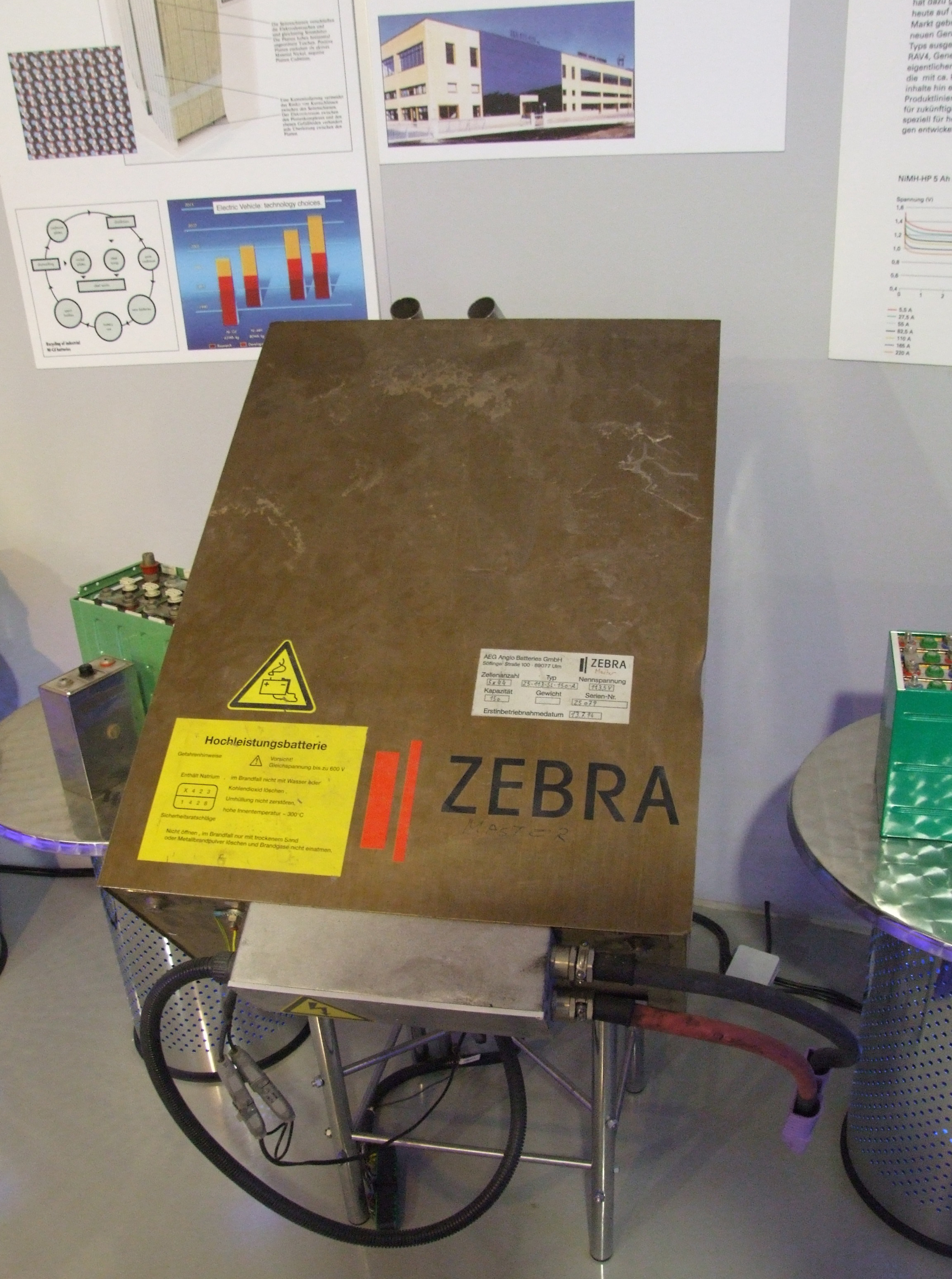
Molten salt battery

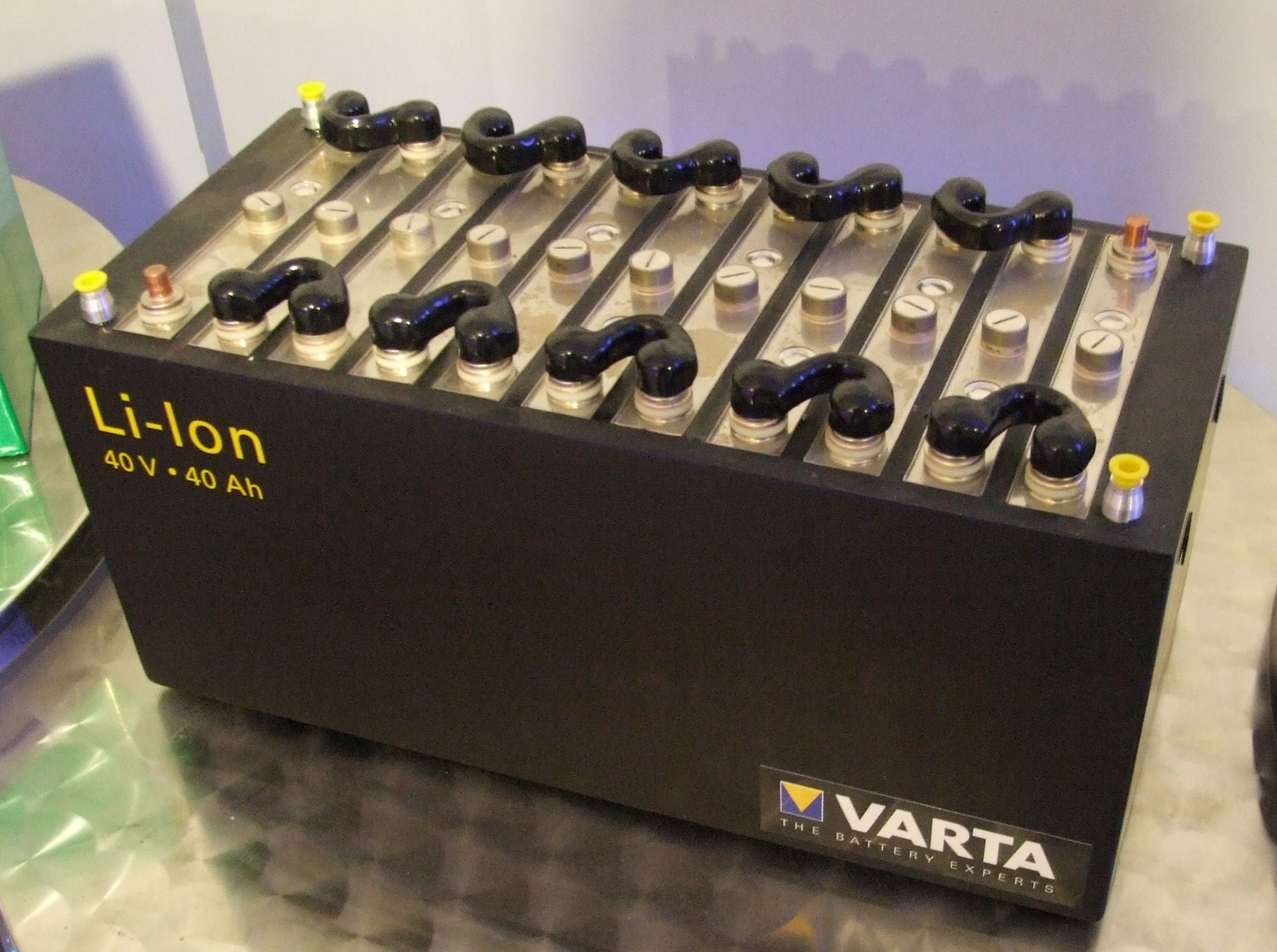
Lithium-ion battery

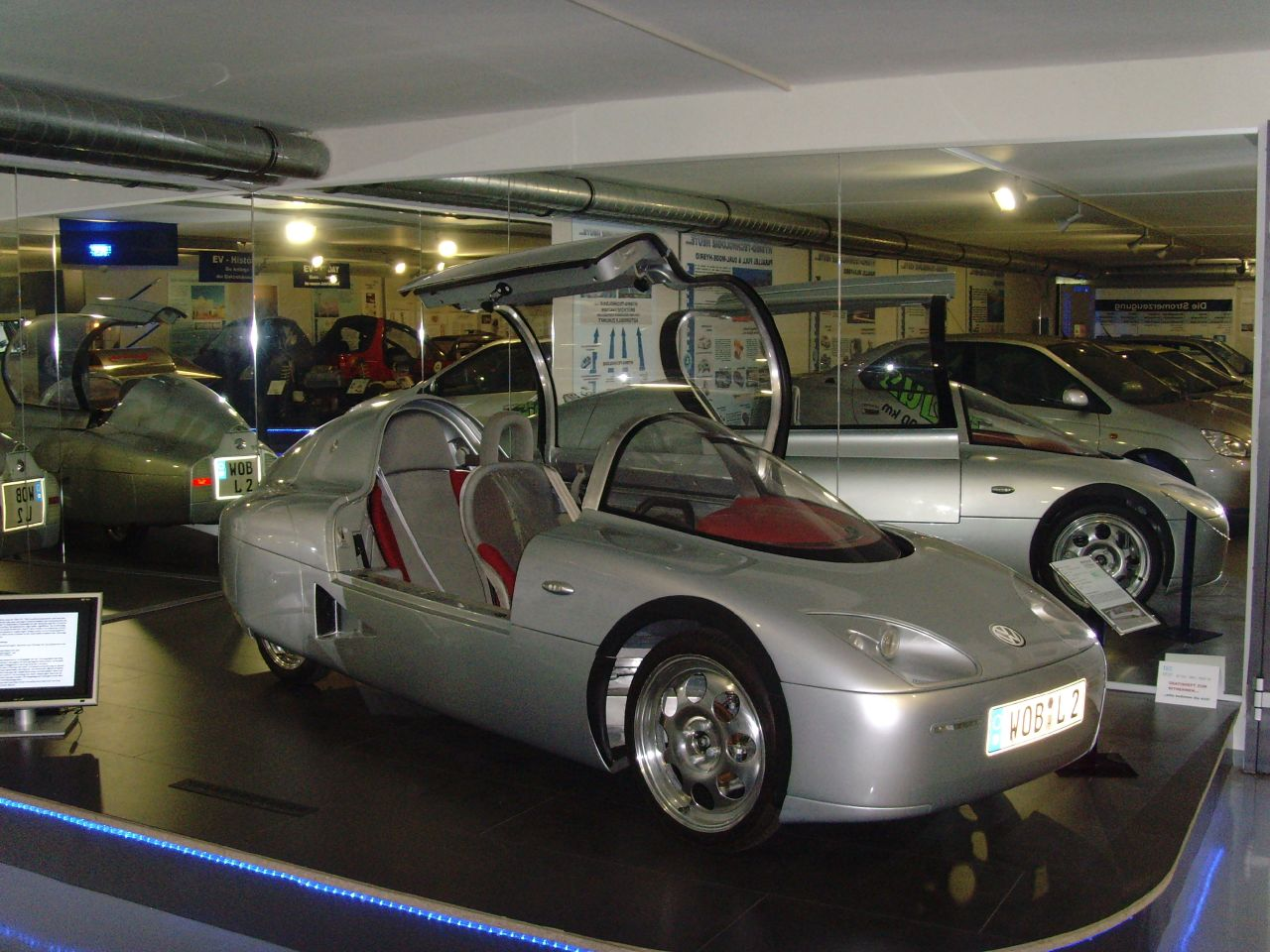
Volkswagen 1-litre car

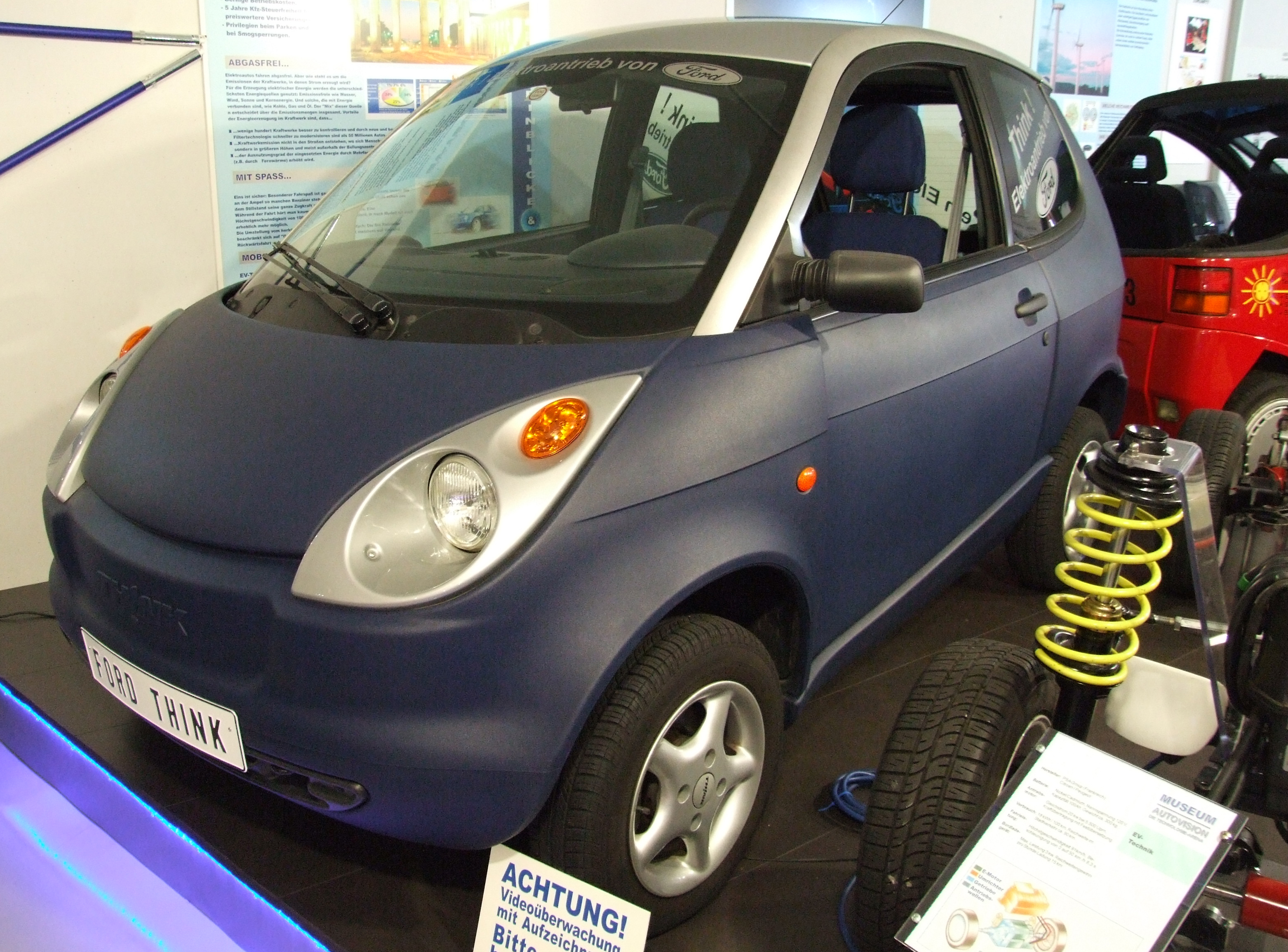
Ford TH!NK
