= Georg Reinholdt Wankel =

Norwegian politician

Georg Reinholdt Wankel (12 January 1843 – 1 February 1907) was a Norwegian politician for the Conservative Party.

He was born in Moss as the son of German-born engineer Ignatz Wankel (1806–1881) and his wife Karen Bolette Sandberg (1815–1898). In June 1869 he married Charlotte Sophie Rosenkilde from Stavanger. She died already in March 1870. In 1882 Wankel married Sigrid Ring, daughter of Jens Ring and granddaughter of Paul Vinsnes. They had several children. Among them were the acclaimed cubist painter Charlotte Wankel.

He was elected to the Norwegian Parliament in 1889, representing the constituency of Smaalenenes Amt. He worked as a farmer there. He served only one term.
