= Charlotte Wankel =

Norwegian artist (1888–1969)

- Born: 12 May 1888; Moss, Norway
- Died: 2 August 1969 (aged 81); Høvik, Norway
- Known for: painting

Charlotte Wankel (12 May 1888 – 2 August 1969) was a Norwegian painter regarded as one of the first Norwegian cubist and painters of abstract art.

== Biography ==
Wankel was raised by wealthy parents at the Kambo estate outside Moss, in Østfold county, Norway. Her father Georg Reinholdt Wankel was a Norwegian politician for the Conservative Party. Her mother was the noted author Sigrid Ring (1870–1955), who was a granddaughter of Norwegian politician Paul Vinsnes.

After her father died in 1907, the family moved to Christiania. For three years, she was a student at the art school of Norwegian painter Harriet Backer (1906–09). Upon the advice of Henrik Sørensen, she became a pupil of Henri Matisse from 1910. She spent long periods in Paris and attended the Pedro Araujo art school (1922–23). She also studied under Fernand Léger and Amédée Ozenfant at the Académie Moderne (1925–29).

At the Académie Moderne, Wankel was introduced to a type of avant-garde architecture and painting which was inspired by Swiss architect and designer, Le Corbusier. Wankel participated in many important exhibitions in Paris, including L'art d'aujord'hui at the Exposition Internationale des Arts Décoratifs et Industriels Modernes in 1925. Here she exhibited along with many famous artists, including Piet Mondrian, Pablo Picasso, Constantin Brâncuși, Juan Gris, Sonia Terk and Robert Delaunay. The exhibition received much press coverage and was the first major international exhibition of avant-garde art after the First World War.

However the time was not right for avant-garde art in Norway. She was on the summer exhibition at Kunstnernes Hus in Oslo in 1933. Her solo exhibition at the Artists' Association in 1930 and Blomqvist in 1934 and a major exhibition was her retrospective exhibition at the National Gallery in Oslo in 1940 generally received negative criticism.

Charlotte Wankel was a restrained and sober artist. She gave her pictures a tight, clear and cool form of treatment, mixed with a purist design. The formats were often modest and palette dominated by blue-gray, brown, yellow, ocher and pink. Her production in late 1930 - and 1950-years are characterized by a stronger palette and compositions are non-figurative, often with some abstract figurative elements.

== Related reading ==
- Jeanneret, Charles Eduard L'art Decoratif D'aujourd'hui (Paris: G. Crès et Cie, 1925) ISBN 978-2-7003-0312-4
