= Hercules (motorcycle) =

German motorcycle brand

Hercules GmbH
- Industry: Bicycles and motorcycles
- Founded: April 5, 1886; 140 years ago
- Founder: Carl Marschütz

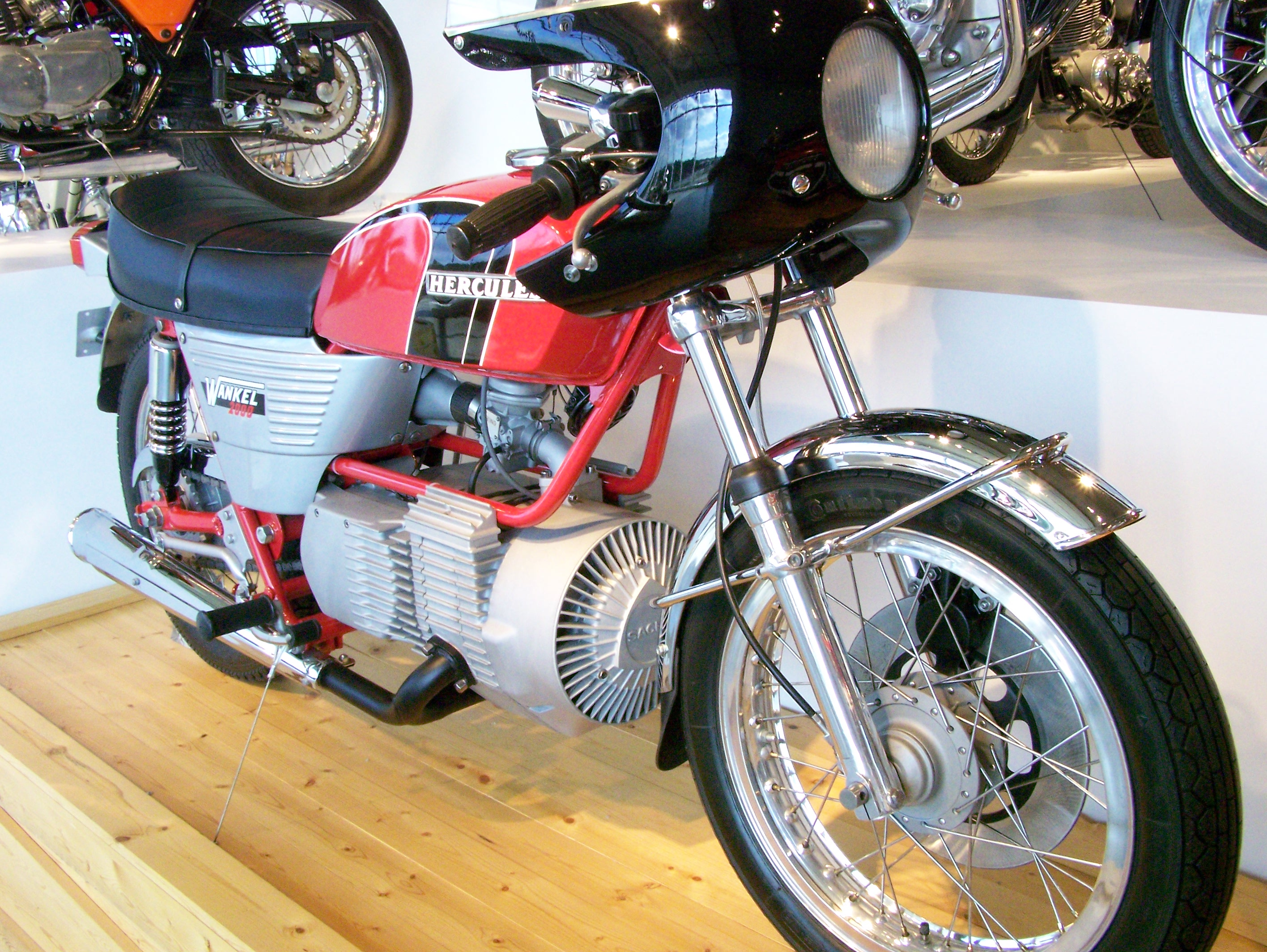
Hercules W2000

Hercules is a German brand of bicycles and motorcycles.

== History ==
Founded as The Hercules Company in 1886 by Carl Marschütz in Nuremberg, Hercules initially only produced bicycles, but began producing motorcycles in 1904.

The company was merged with Zweirad Union after being purchased by Fichtel & Sachs in 1963. In the 1950s and 1960s, Sachs was the largest European fabricator of two-stroke engines for motorcycles. Many of these engines were used in Hercules-branded motorcycles, scooters and mopeds.

In 1996, Hercules ended motorcycle production. In 2014, Zweirad Einkaufs Genossenschaft bought the rights to the Hercules brand from Accell.

=== Wankel engine use ===
In 1974, Hercules became the first company to offer a Wankel engine-powered motorcycle for sale to the general public—the W-2000. A prototype was first shown in 1970 at the West Cologne Autumn Motorcycle Show to a mixed reception. As the United Kingdom already had its own motorcycle company named Hercules, the W-2000 was marketed there as a DKW.

The W-2000 had a Sachs-built air-cooled 294 cc single-rotor engine that produced between 23–32 hp (17–24 kW). Cooling was via a large fan in front of the engine, aided by oncoming wind at speed, and engine lubrication relied on manually adding oil to the fuel in the tank. In 1976, Hercules launched the W-2000 Injection, in which a pump introduced lubricant from a separate reservoir. It had 18-inch wheels, a front disc brake, and a rear drum brake.

A March 1976 Cycle World review praised the W-2000's handling, but noted that the bike's low ground clearance limited its cornering ability, declaring the W-2000 to be a daily commuting bike instead of a sports bike.

In May 1975, Hercules introduced a rotary-powered dirt bike, the KC-30 GS Enduro. The model failed to sell due to its high price of $2,900.

The Sachs single-rotor engine as used by Hercules, the only commercially available engine then, was used as a basis by BSA engineer David Garside in the early 1970s when designing a 588 cc twin-rotor motorcycle engine, which reached production in the Norton Classic.

== Partial product line ==
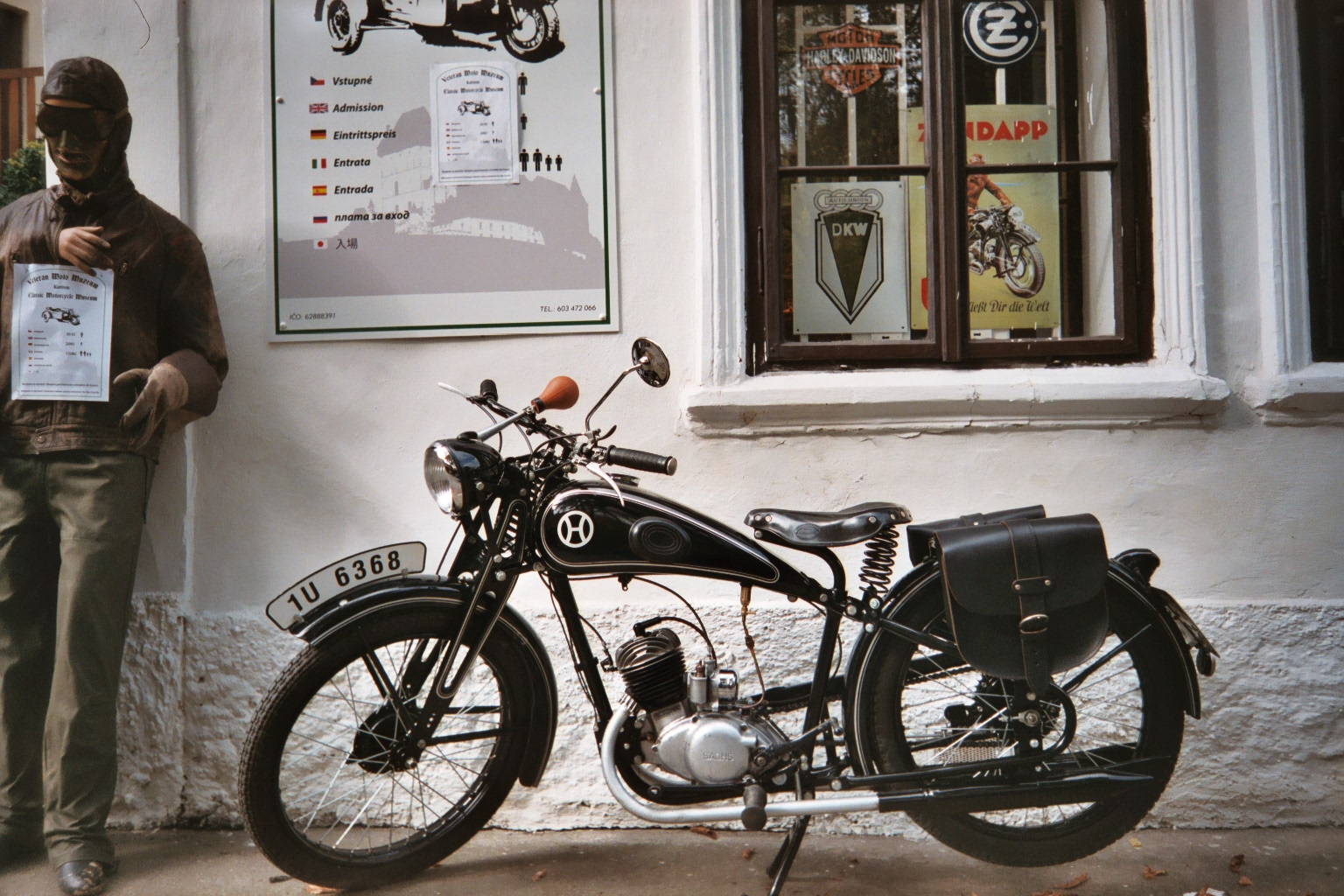
Hercules S125

- Hercules K500 (1932–1936)
- Hercules S125 (1939–1943)
- Hercules B50 (1932–1935)
- Hercules Moped, 49 cc (1957)
- Hercules Scooter, 50 cc
- Hercules Ultra III Sachs 50 SW
- Hercules Lilliput, 98 cc
- Hercules MK1 moped
- Hercules MK2 moped
- Hercules MK3 moped
- Hercules MK4 moped
- Hercules Supra 4GP moped
- Hercules Supra 4 Enduro moped
- Hercules Prior Moped
- Hercules Lastboy
- Hercules K100 (1959)
- Hercules R 200 (1959)
- Hercules 220 (1965)
- Hercules 103 (1966)
- Hercules Postie Bike (1969)
- Hercules K 105 X (1970)
- Hercules K 125 X (1971)
- Hercules K 50 RX (1971)
- Hercules K 125 Military (1971–1990)
- Hercules K 125 (1972)
- Hercules K 125 T (1973)
- Hercules K125 S (1974–1979)
- Hercules W-2000 (1974–1978)
- Hercules E1 (1974)
- Hercules KC-30 GS Enduro (1975)
- Hercules 175 GS (1976)
- Hercules 502 GS (1976)
- Hercules GS250 Ice Racer (1977)
- Hercules MC250 (1978)
- Hercules DKW 250 GS (1978)
- Hercules Prima 5S (1984)
- Hercules Prima Frisiert
- Hercules GS 125B
- Hercules KJBe
- Hercules K 180 Military (1991–1996)
