= General Motors Rotary Combustion Engine =

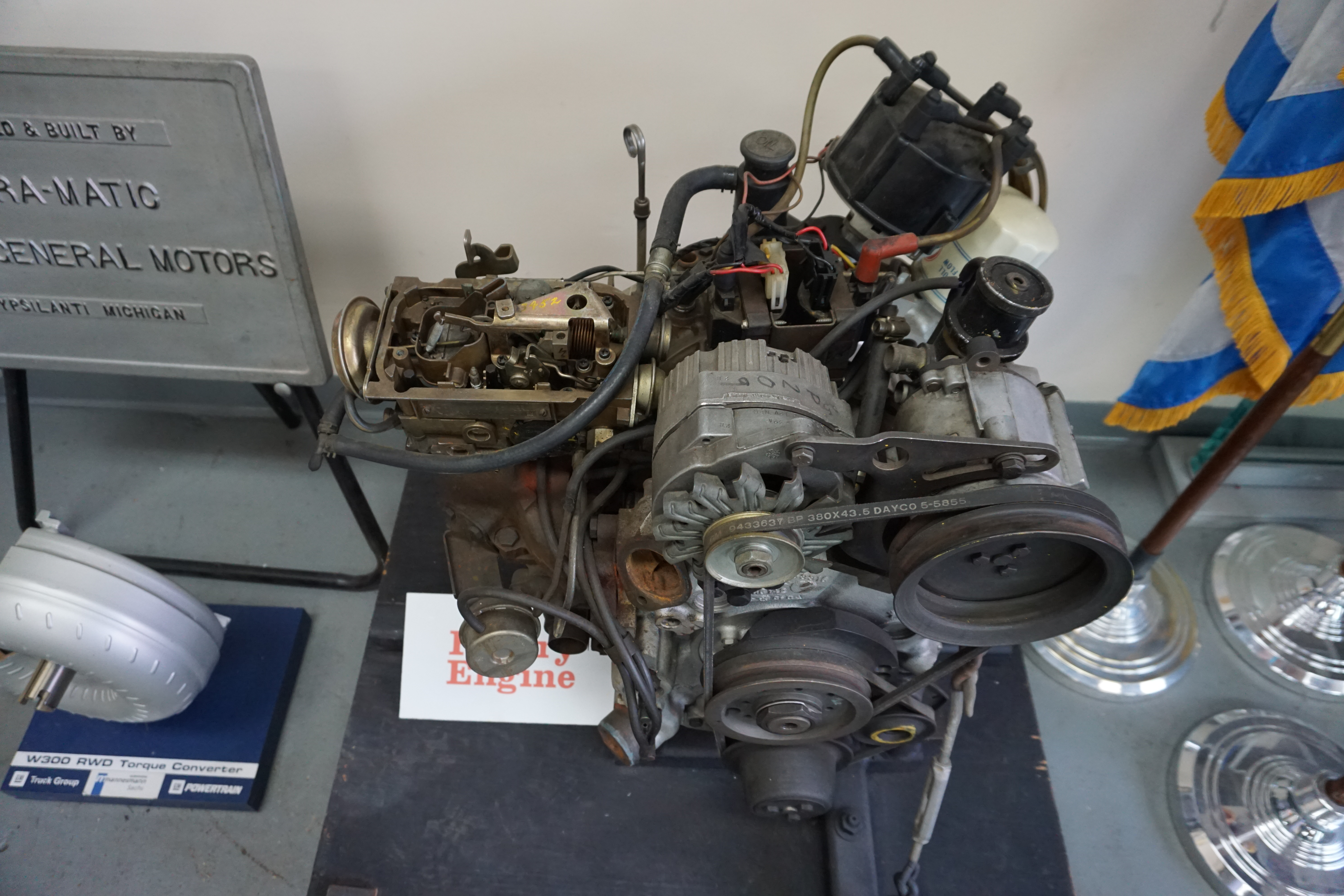
A General Motors rotary engine at the Ypsilanti Automotive Heritage Museum

The General Motors Rotary Combustion Engine (GMRCE) is an internal combustion Wankel engine which uses a rotary design to convert pressure into a rotating motion instead of using reciprocating pistons. In November 1970, GM paid $50 million ($414,524,422 in 2025 dollars) for initial licenses to produce their version of the Wankel rotary engine, and GM President Ed Cole initially projected its release in three years. Chevrolet, with impetus from Pete Estes and John DeLorean, as well as Ed Cole worked on the Wankel. Bob Templin was the chief executive in charge of rotary-engine research at the GM Tech Center in Warren, Michigan, but Ed Cole would leave his office in Detroit twice a week for the trip to Warren, taking charge of the program. The engine was initially targeted for an October 1973 introduction as a 1974 Chevrolet Vega option. Its mediocre fuel economy and the ill-timed Arab oil embargo were contributing factors to end the GM rotary program.

== History of Development ==
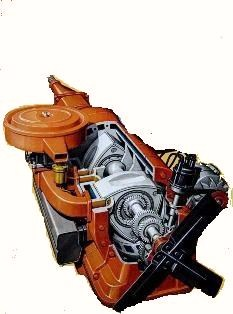
1972 GM Rotary engine cutaway shows twin-rotors

Popular Science magazine in the May 1972 article "GM Rotary Engine for the 1974 Vega", an illustration of the Wankel installed in a 1974 Vega hatchback showed a different grille, a lower, more sloped hood line, and a "GM Rotary" badge and Wankel crest on the rear quarter panel. They stated the Vega-rotary would be sold as a package with performance items, including mag-styled wheels, radial tires, and rally stripes.

The Wankel had so far proven more reliable than four, six, and eight-cylinder engines – GM-rotary engines were run up to 500,000 miles (800,000 km) showing only minimal wear, and the engine's fewer moving parts assured its reliability. The final design General Motors Rotary Combustion Engine (GMRCE) was fixed when responsibility for the power plant's manufacture was turned over to General Motors Hydra Matic Division in August 1972 – two rotors displacing 206 cubic inches (3.38 L), twin distributors and coils, and a switch to aluminum housing construction. Iron couldn't match the heat-dissipating qualities of aluminum. In addition, there was also a rotor tip-seal problem in the cast-iron configuration, especially after 15,000 miles (24,000 km). RC2-206 Wankels were installed in 1973 Vegas for cold weather testing performed in Canada.

=== Fuel economy vs reliability and meeting emissions ===
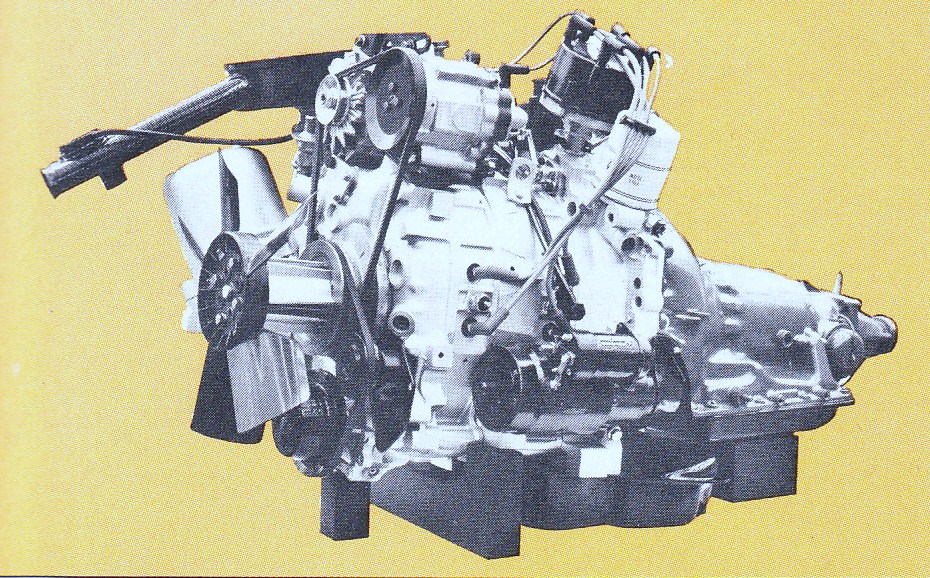
1974 Vega RC2-206 Wankel

Early in 1973, progress on the generation I Wankel engine had progressed to the point where GM felt it had a good chance to meet '75 emissions standards. To meet those standards GM had to scrap the design theory of widely spaced dual spark plugs and move them closer to the rotor chamber, Mazda fashion. That helped lower emissions but did not improve fuel economy, and GM was unwilling to face gas mileage criticism that Mazda withstood.

In April 1973, the Environmental Protection Agency (EPA) relaxed emission standards for '75, and GM tuned the engine to provide better mileage at a sacrifice to exhaust emissions by reverting to the earlier layout. Other refinements improved mileage to 20 mpg_{‑US} (12 L/100 km; 24 mpg_{‑imp}), according to GM, but with the fuel breakthrough came related side-effect problems. Durability under the "hot" set-up began to deteriorate. Higher temperatures and pressures affected both apex seals and the chrome-on-steel-on-aluminum coating of the trochoid surface. The surface plating tended to crack and flake away around the exhaust port, blamed by GM engineers on sudden cooling after hard, hot running.

Motor Trend magazine, in the July 1973 article "The '75 Vega Rotary" quoted: "GM saw the rotary engine's future as probably much greater than they do today...mileage will be in the 16–18 mpg_{‑US} (15–13 L/100 km; 19–22 mpg_{‑imp}) range. Compared to the normal piston (engine) Vega's 20 to 26 mpg_{‑US} (11.8 to 9.0 L/100 km; 24 to 31 mpg_{‑imp}), the whole rotary deal begins to look just a little less attractive, with what the price of gasoline skyrocketing, but that's another matter."

By November, 1973 the side-effect troubles were intense. No immediate solutions were being revealed by engineers working all but around the clock, their backs to the two walls of production tooling requirements and the need to freeze a design to begin emission certification. Ed Cole and his top engineer Frank Winchell, had taken personal charge of the project and had stopped work on all other GM-rotaries to focus on the problems of the Vega RC2-206 Wankel. A month later it was clear the Wankel would not be ready for either production or emissions certification in time for the start of the 1975 model year. A new model had now been planned to showcase the engine; The 1975 Vega-based Monza 2+2. On December 21, 1973, when GM paid another $10 million against its rotary licence fees, the company announced the first postponement.

Motor Trend in April 1974 predicted the outcome: "If the GM rotary engine hasn't made a place for itself in the company's lineup by fall, and if by then it hasn't been locked into the '75 model range - somewhere - the odds will increase that it may never go into production."

=== End of rotary program ===
The Wankel cycle

On September 24, 1974, Ed Cole postponed the Wankel engine, ostensibly due to emissions difficulties. He retired the same month. The rotary's emissions problem was mentioned with no specifics. GM admitted fuel economy for the rotary was sub-standard and postponed production in favor of further development. Pete Estes succeeded Ed Cole as GM President and never showed any special interest in the Wankel or in the perpetuation of Cole's ideas. As General Motors managers were cancelling the Wankel project, the R&D team partly released the results of their most recent research, which claimed to have solved the fuel economy problem, and reliable engines with a lifespan above 530,000 miles. These findings were not taken into account when the cancellation order was issued. The General Motors' abandonment of the rotary engine affected American Motors, who had an agreement to purchase rotary power plants from General Motors. The 1975 AMC Pacer was designed to utilize GM's new rotary engine, however AMC was forced to market the car with an inline six engine.

=== Rotary vs GM V8 engine ===
206 cu in (3,380 cc) Wankel vs. 307 cu in (5,030 cc) V8 engine

- Weight: Wankel - 255 lb (116 kg) / V8 - 465 lb (211 kg)
- Number of parts: Wankel - 698 / V8 - 1,103
- Moving parts: Wankel - 154 / V8 - 388
- Space requirement: Wankel - 5.5 cu ft (0.16 m^{3}) / V8 - 23 cu ft (0.65 m^{3})
- Net power @ rpm: Wankel - 150 hp (112 kW) @ 6,000 / V8 - 130 hp (97 kW) @ 4,000
- Net torque @ rpm: Wankel - 125 lb⋅ft (169 N⋅m) @ 4,000 / V8 - 230 lb⋅ft (312 N⋅m) @ 2,400
- Hp per lb / kW/kg.: Wankel - 0.59 hp/lb (0.97 kW/kg) / V8 - 0.28 hp/lb (0.46 kW/kg)
- Power per required space: Wankel - 27 hp/cu ft (710 kW/m^{3}) / V8 - 5.7 hp/cu ft (150 kW/m^{3})

== See also ==
- Wankel engine
