= Ed Cole =

American automotive executive

- Born: Edward Nicholas Cole; September 17, 1909; Marne, Michigan, U.S.
- Died: May 2, 1977 (aged 67); Mendon, Michigan, U.S.
- Education: Grand Rapids Community College; General Motors Institute
- Occupation: Automobile industry executive
- Years active: 1948–1977
- Employer: General Motors
- Notable work: Chevrolet Corvair, Chevrolet Vega

Edward Nicholas Cole (September 17, 1909 – May 2, 1977) was an American inventor, automotive engineer and executive, widely known for leading critical projects for General Motors, including development of the Chevrolet Corvair and Chevrolet Vega; developing GM's Small Block V8 and its rotary engine, championing the catalytic converter to migrate cars from leaded gasoline, and advocating for air bags. He was President of General Motors from 1967 through 1974.

== Background ==
Cole was born in 1909 in Marne, Michigan, to Franklin Benjamin Cole (1874-1944) and Lucy Blasen Cole (1879-1962). Raised on a dairy farm, as a youth he designed, built, and sold homemade radio sets, and as a teenager became a field representative for a tractor manufacturer. He wanted to be a lawyer, but landed a part-time job in an auto parts store while attending Grand Rapids Community College.

In 1930, Cole enrolled in the General Motors Institute, where he was selected by GM for an engineering assignment at Cadillac, before his graduation. He was a member of the Phi Kappa Epsilon (now Pi Kappa Alpha) Fraternity.

In 1933, he married Esther Helene Engman (1906-1980), and they had two children, Dr David E Cole and Martha Cole Lefever. He divorced Esther in 1964, to marry Dollie Ann Fechner (1930-2014), and they had one child, Edward N. Cole Jr.

Cole died May 2, 1977 at age 67, when he became disoriented while flying by instrument in foggy, rainy conditions, crashing in his twin-engine Beagle B.206 near Kalamazoo, Michigan. At the time of the crash, the FAA had been investigating an incident on April 28 of that year, when Cole, who was instrument rated, became disoriented during another instrument landing.

He was survived by his ex-wife and wife as well as his natural children, adopted children from his second wife's previous marriage (David E., Anne Cole Pierce and Robert Joseph) and stepson William Jefferson McVey III. His funeral service was attended by more than 400, including dignitaries and industry executives. Cole's wife Dollie, routinely described as forceful and dynamic, would later become a chief advocate of the National Corvette Museum.

== Career ==
Cole worked in engineering, rising to co-head a team (with Harry Barr) that developed the 1949 Cadillac V8. He was briefly assigned to run a GM plant in Cleveland, Ohio, when Chevrolet general manager Tom Keating requested his assignment as chief engineer.

He became chief engineer of the Chevrolet Division in 1952. His most important task was to develop a new engine for Chevy's lineup as an adjunct to the Chevrolet Blue Flame straight-six; that new engine was Chevrolet's small-block V8, a massive success that remained in production for decades. He collaborated with Zora Arkus-Duntov to revitalize the weak-performing early Corvettes, and he also introduced engineering and design advancements in the Chevrolet car and truck lines between 1955 and 1962.

Cole was promoted to general manager of Chevrolet in 1956. During these years, Chevy was a perennial sales leader, but with only larger cars in the lineup. As general manager of Chevrolet, he directed the development of the Corvair intended to pursue the compact car market. The strong early sales of the new car with its radical design with rear-engine, rear-wheel drive layout, put Cole on the cover of Time magazine October 5, 1959 issue. Cole was promoted to head the GM car and truck group in 1961, then to executive vice-president in 1965, and to president in 1967.

Cole was chief engineer of the Chevrolet Vega and directed the GM design staff in developing their first subcompact, four passenger vehicle. Cole's persistence in getting his advanced engineering projects to the production line resulted in the innovative aluminum engines in both the Corvair and Vega. He "would preside over Vega's troubled launch, which was intertwined with a disastrous 1970 confrontation between GM and the United Auto Workers." Ironically, Cole's greatest engineering triumph came the same year. Cole ordered engine compression ratios reduced after 1970 knowing regulations would tighten. Cole oversaw the transition away from leaded gasoline and prepared GM for catalytic converters in 1975.

Cole retired from GM in 1974. He then became chairman and CEO of Checker Motors Corporation and Chairman of International Husky, an air-freight company. In 1977, the Rifle River Scout Canoe Base was renamed the Edward N. Cole Canoe Base to reflect the dedication of Edward N. Cole to Scouting in the Detroit Area. Cole became a member of Michigan Gamma chapter of the Tau Beta Pi Engineering Honor Society in 1952. In 1998, Cole was posthumously inducted into the Corvette Hall of Fame.

His son, David E. Cole, is Chairman Emeritus of the Center for Automotive Research (CAR) in Ann Arbor, Michigan.

He was inducted into the Automotive Hall of Fame in 1977. Cole is featured in the History Channel documentary film, The Cars That Made America.

Business positions
Preceded by James M. Roche	President of the General Motors Corporation; 1967 – 1974	Succeeded by Pete Estes
