= Mean effective pressure =

Measure of an engine's capacity to do work

- Common symbols: p
- SI unit: Pascal (Pa)
- In SI base units: 1 kg⋅m^{−1}⋅s^{−2}
- Derivations from other quantities: p = W·V^{−1}
- Dimension: $\mathsf{L}^{-1} \mathsf{M} \mathsf{T}^{-2}$

The mean effective pressure (MEP) is a quantity relating to the operation of a reciprocating engine and is a measure of an engine's capacity to do work independent of the engine displacement. Despite having the dimension of pressure, MEP cannot be measured. When quoted as an indicated mean effective pressure (IMEP), it may be thought of as the average pressure acting on a piston during the different portions of its cycle. When friction losses are subtracted from the IMEP, the result is the brake mean effective pressure (BMEP).

== Derivation ==
Let:

$P$ = power output in watt;
$p_\text{me}$ = mean effective pressure in megapascal;
$V_\text{d}$ = displacement volume in cubic centimeters;
$i$ = number of cycles per revolution (for a 4-stroke engine, $i =0.5$, for a 2-stroke engine, $i =1$); (Note: Wankel engines are four-stroke engines, so $i =0.5$; the displacement $V_\text{d}$ is derived from the chamber volume $V_\text{c}$ by multiplying it with the number of rotary pistons $i$ and 2: $V_\text{d} = 2 V_\text{c} i$ (see Wolf-Dieter Bensinger: Rotationskolben-Verbrennungsmotoren, Springer, Berlin/Heidelberg/New York 1973, ISBN 978-3-642-52174-4, p. 66))
$n$ = number of revolutions per second;
$\omega =$ angular velocity, i.e. $\omega = 2 \pi n$;
$M$ = torque in newton-metre.

Then, BMEP may be used to determine an engine's power output as follows:

$$P=i \cdot n \cdot V_\text{d} \cdot p_\text{me}$$

Since we know that power is:

$$P = \omega \cdot M = 2 \pi \cdot n \cdot M$$

We now see that, BMEP is a measure of expressing torque per displacement:

$$P = i \cdot n \cdot V_\text{d} \cdot p_\text{me} = 2 \pi \cdot n \cdot M$$

And thus, the equation for BMEP in terms of torque is:

$$p_\text{me} = {{M \cdot 2 \pi} \over {V_\text{d} \cdot i}}.$$

Speed has dropped out of the equation, and the only variables are the torque and displacement volume. Since the range of maximum brake mean effective pressures for good engine designs is well established, we now have a displacement-independent measure of the torque-producing capacity of an engine design – a specific torque of sorts. This is useful for comparing engines of different displacements. Mean effective pressure is also useful for initial design calculations; that is, given a torque, standard MEP values can be used to estimate the required engine displacement. However, mean effective pressure does not reflect the actual pressures inside an individual combustion chamber – although the two are certainly related – and serves only as a convenient measure of performance.

Brake mean effective pressure (BMEP) is calculated from measured dynamometer torque. Net indicated mean effective pressure (IMEP) is calculated using the indicated power; i.e., the pressure volume integral in the work per cycle equation. Sometimes the term FMEP (friction mean effective pressure) is used as an indicator of the mean effective pressure lost to friction (or friction torque) and is just the difference between IMEP and BMEP.

== Examples ==
MEP from torque and displacement

A four-stroke engine produces 159 N·m of torque, and displaces 2000 cm^{3}

- $i = 0.5$
- $M = 159 \; \text{N} {\cdot} \text{m}$
- $V_\text{d} = 2000 \; \text{cm}^3$

$$p_\text{me} = {2 \pi} \cdot {0.5^{-1}} {{159 \; \text{N} {\cdot} \text{m}} \over {2000 \; \text{cm}^3}} = {2 \pi} \cdot {0.5^{-1}} {{15900 \; \text{N} \cancel{\cdot \text{cm}}} \over {2000 \; \text{cm}^{{\cancel 3} 2}}} \approx 100 \; \text{N} {\cdot} \text{cm}^{-2} = 1 \; \text{MPa}$$

Power from MEP and crankshaft speed

If we know the crankshaft speed, we can also determine the engine's power output from the MEP figure: $P=i \cdot n \cdot V_\text{d} \cdot p_\text{me}$
In our example, the engine puts out 159 N·m of torque at 3600 min^{−1} (=60 s^{−1}):

- $i = 0.5$
- $n = 60 \; \text{s}^{-1}$
- $V_\text{d} = 2000 \; \text{cm}^3$
- $p_\text{me} = 1 \; \text{MPa}$

Thus:

$$P = {2000 \; \text{cm}^{3} \cdot 1 \; \text{N} {\cdot} \text{cm}^{-2} \cdot 60 \; \text{s}^{-1} \cdot 0.5}= 60{,}000 \; \text{N} {\cdot} \text{m} \cdot \text{s}^{-1} = 60{,}000 \; \text{W} = 60 \; \text{kW}$$

As piston engines usually have their maximum torque at a lower rotating speed than the maximum power output, the BMEP is lower at full power (at higher rotating speed). If the same engine is rated 72 kW at 5400 min^{−1} = 90 s^{−1}, and its BMEP is 0.80 MPa, we get the following equation:

- $i = 0.5$
- $n = 90 \; \text{s}^{-1}$
- $V_\text{d}=2000 \; \text{cm}^3$
- $p_\text{me}= 0.80 \; \text{MPa}$

Then:

$$P = {2000 \; \text{cm}^{3} \cdot 0.80 \; \text{N} {\cdot} \text{cm}^{-2} \cdot 90 \; \text{s}^{-1} \cdot 0.5} = 72{,}000 \; \text{N} {\cdot} \text{m} \cdot \text{s}^{-1} = 72 \; \text{kW}$$

== Types of mean effective pressures ==
Mean effective pressure (MEP) is defined by the location measurement and method of calculation, some commonly used MEPs are given here:

- Brake mean effective pressure (BMEP, $p_{me}$) - Mean effective pressure calculated from measured brake torque.
- Indicated mean effective pressure (IMEP, $p_{mi}$) - Mean effective pressure calculated from in-cylinder pressure over the complete engine cycle (720° in a four-stroke, 360° in a two-stroke). IMEP may be determined by planimetering the area in an engine's pV-diagram. Since naturally aspirated four-stroke engines must perform pumping work to suck the charge into the cylinder, and to remove the exhaust from the cylinder, IMEP may be split into the high-pressure, gross mean effective pressure (GMEP, $p_{mg}$) and the pumping mean effective pressure (PMEP, $p_{miGW}$). In naturally aspirated engines, PMEP is negative, and in super- or turbocharged engines, it is usually positive. IMEP may be derived from PMEP and GMEP: $p_{mi} = p_{mg}-p_{miGW}$.
- Friction mean effective pressure (FMEP, $p_{mr}$) - Theoretical mean effective pressure required to overcome engine friction, can be thought of as mean effective pressure lost due to friction: $p_{mr}=p_{mi}-p_{me}$. FMEP rises with an increase in engine speed.

== BMEP typical values ==
BMEP typical values
Engine type	Typical max. BMEP
Motorbike engine	1.2 MPa (174.0 lbf/in^{2})
Race car engine (NA Formula 1)	1.6 MPa (232.1 lbf/in^{2})
Passenger car engine (naturally aspirated Otto)	1.3 MPa (188.5 lbf/in^{2})
Passenger car engine (turbocharged Otto)	2.2 MPa (319.1 lbf/in^{2})
Passenger car engine (turbocharged Diesel)	2.0 MPa (290.1 lbf/in^{2})
Lorry engine (turbocharged Diesel)	2.4 MPa (348.1 lbf/in^{2})
High-speed industrial Diesel engine	2.8 MPa (406.1 lbf/in^{2})
Medium-speed industrial Diesel engine	2.5 MPa (362.6 lbf/in^{2})
Low-speed two-stroke Diesel engine	1.5 MPa (217.6 lbf/in^{2})

== See also ==
- Compression ratio
