= Wolf-Dieter Bensinger =

German engineer (1907 – 1974)

Personal details
- Born: 26 February 1907 Donaueschingen, Baden, German Empire
- Died: 17 June 1974 (aged 67) West Germany
- Scientific career
- Known for: Development of the Wankel engine
- Fields: Mechanical engineering; Aerospace engineering; Wankel engine

Wolf-Dieter Bensinger (26 February 1907 – 17 June 1974) was a German engineer and university professor who contributed significantly to the development of the Wankel rotary engine.

== Life and career ==
Bensinger was born in Donaueschingen in 1907.

In 1931, Bensinger became head of development at Deutsche Versuchsanstalt für Luftfahrt (DVL) in Berlin. At DVL, he developed a sleeve valve system for the Daimler-Benz DB 600. On 20 October 1934, Bensinger married Ilse Margarete Anna, who originated from Stargard, Pommern. Their son was born in 1936. In the 1930s he met Felix Wankel, who became a long-term friend, and with whom Bensinger had a strong bond of trust.

From 1943 or 1944 Besinger worked as an engineer with Daimler-Benz AG in Stuttgart where he became head of New Engine Development. From 1945, Bensinger became head of Passenger Car Engine Development. He designed engines such as the six-cylinder Mercedes-Benz M 180 Otto engine (later used in the Mercedes-Benz W 187 series Type 220), and he contributed to the design of the Mercedes-Benz M 198 Otto engine used in the Mercedes-Benz W 198 series Type 300 SL. In 1959, Bensinger became a procurator with Daimler-Benz AG, and from 1963, he was the leading engineer in Daimler-Benz's passenger car engine development.

In 1960, Bensinger began Wankel engine development at Daimler-Benz, without having a written licence agreement with Wankel or NSU; Bensinger and Wankel, who were friends, had a verbal agreement. Eventually, the licence agreement was signed on 26 October 1961. In 1971, Bensinger received and offer of a professorship at the University of Stuttgart. Contemporaries considered Bensinger a Wankel engine enthusiast.

== Works ==
- Wolf-Dieter Bensinger: Konstruktion und Berechnung von hochbelasteten Zahnrädern. Formeln zur Berechnung der Zahnradabmessungen und zur Aufzeichnung der Verzahnungen, Automobiltechnische Zeitschrift, vol. 54, Springer, 1952, p. 256–258
- Bensinger, Wolf-Dieter (1955). "Die Steuerung des Gaswechsels in schnellaufenden Verbrennungsmotoren". Konstruktionsbücher. Vol. 16. Berlin, Heidelberg: Springer. doi:10.1007/978-3-642-52953-5. ISBN 978-3-642-52954-2.
- Wolf-Dieter Bensinger, Alfred Meier: Kolben, Pleuel und Kurbelwelle bei schnellaufenden Verbrennungsmotoren, 2nd edition, Springer, Berlin Heidelberg 1961, ISBN 9783540027096
- Bensinger, Wolf-Dieter (1968). "Die Steuerung des Gaswechsels in schnellaufenden Verbrennungsmotoren". Konstruktionsbücher. Vol. 16 (2 ed.). Berlin, Heidelberg: Springer. doi:10.1007/978-3-662-21808-2. ISBN 978-3-540-04213-6.
- Wolf-Dieter Bensinger: Der heutige Entwicklungsstand des Wankelmotors. In: MTZ – Motortechnische Zeitschrift, Vol. 31, No. 1, Springer, 1970, ISSN 0024-8525, p. 10–16
- Bensinger, Wolf-Dieter (1973). Rotationskolben-Verbrennungsmotoren (in German). Berlin, Heidelberg: Springer. doi:10.1007/978-3-642-52173-7. ISBN 978-3-642-52174-4.
