= MidWest AE series =

AE series
- Type: Wankel aero engine
- National origin: United Kingdom
- Manufacturer: Mid West Engines Ltd.

The MidWest AE series are lightweight, liquid-cooled, single- and twin-rotor Wankel engines, with dual ignition, designed for light aircraft. They were produced by Mid-West Engines Ltd. at Staverton Airport, Gloucestershire, UK.

== History ==
This engine design traces its origins to the Birmingham Small Arms Company Umberslade Hall research unit in Birmingham. David Garside, a BSA engineer, designed an air-cooled twin-rotor motorcycle engine that was based on the Fichtel & Sachs motor later used in the Hercules motorcycle. Wankel engines produce large amounts of heat, so Garside gave this air-cooled motor interior cooling air that was drawn first through the rotors and into a large plenum chamber before entering the combustion chambers via the carburetors. Only 100 of the air-cooled Norton Classics were produced. The later Norton Commander had liquid-cooling, but with the same air-cooled rotors as the Classic model. These Norton engines had a total-loss oiling system, similar to an oil-injected two-stroke engine.

== Development ==
ARV Super2 with AE110

Very closely based upon the Norton engine, the MidWest engine developed the design further. The lubrication system became a semi-total-loss system whereby Silkolene 2-stroke oil was directly injected into the inlet tracts and onto the main roller bearings, but the oil that fed the bearings became an oil-mist within the rotor-cooling air, with about 30% of the oil recovered and returned to the remote oil tank. Unlike the Norton engine, the rotor-cooling air was forced in by a belt-driven centrifugal pump and then dumped overboard as it was considered too hot for ideal volumetric efficiency. Instead, ambient-temperature combustion air was inducted into the engine separately. Early Midwest engines had simple Tillotson carburettors, but these proved unsatisfactory and later engines were fitted with fuel injection. This gave the advantage both of precise fuel delivery and avoided the need for carburettor heat as the risk of induction icing was diminished.

The engine produces maximum power at 7,500 rpm (the rotors turning at only 2,500 rpm), a 2.96:1 reduction gearbox (closely based on that in the Hewland AE75 engine) gave an efficient maximum propeller speed 2,500 rpm. Unlike the Hewland's gearbox, where the output shaft and propeller flange were below the crankshaft, the MidWest's gearbox had its output shaft higher than the eccentric shaft. When installed in the ARV Super2 aircraft, this feature allowed a larger diameter propeller to be used, with better propeller clearance, while raising the height of the engine's thrust line, and reducing downward visibility over the nose very slightly.

=== Marketing ===
MidWest planned to market the AE-series engine in the fast-growing light aircraft and kitplane sector. The AE engine's characteristics made it suited for aviation use, being lightweight, very compact, low vibration and simple in construction. Also, whereas Wankel engines in car and motorcycle applications often suffered insufficient engine warm up time prior to power application, in aircraft use, engine checks and taxiing ensured that it would be at operating temperature by the time the runway was reached. However, two factors lead to the MidWest engine's lack of market success downfall. The engine was originally intended to be the main powerplant for the Europa XS, but the kitplane's designer, Ivan Shaw, lost patience with the crude Tillotson carburettors, and opted for the Rotax 912 as a replacement. Instead of initially making their engines available only for non-certified aircraft, MidWest embarked on the expensive and time-consuming process of seeking a type certificate and the engine ceased production after only a limited number had been built.

== Diamond Aircraft purchase of Midwest ==
Diamond Aircraft Industries bought MidWest and transferred the engine rights to Austro Engine, a company founded in 2007 and located in Wiener Neustadt. Diamond discontinued production of the MidWest twin-rotor engine, but for a period they continued building the single-rotor model, mainly for the motor glider market. Diamond then designed and produced two replacement models, both single-rotor Wankel engines: the 55 hp (41 kW) Austro Engine AE50R and the 75 hp (56 kW) Austro Engine AE75R. These new designs feature liquid cooling with forced-air rotor cooling, metered, direct oil lubrication pumped to the main bearings and to the rotor tips, via the inlet manifold, with partial oil recovery, dual ignition and electric starting, all of which were features of the MidWest engines. They also use electronic fuel injection.

== Variants ==
AE50
Single rotor, 294 cc (18 cu in), (max) 50 hp (37 kW) at 7800 rpm, (cruise) 45 hp (34 kW) at 6900 rpm, gearbox ratio 3.23:1, 33 kg dry weight including all attached ancillaries, but excluding the exhaust
AE100
Twin rotor, 588 cc (36 cu in), (max) 100 hp (75 kW) at 7800 rpm, (cruise) 92 hp (69 kW) at 6900 rpm, gearbox ratio 2.95:1, 53 kg dry weight including all attached ancillaries, but excluding the exhaust
AE110
Twin rotor, 588 cc (36 cu in), (max) 110 hp (82 kW) at 7800 rpm, (cruise) 99 hp (74 kW) at 6900 rpm, gearbox ratio 2.95:1, 53 kg dry weight including all attached ancillaries, but excluding the exhaust

== Austro engine variants ==
AE50R
Single rotor, 294 cc (18 cu in), (max) 55 hp (41 kW) at 7750 rpm, 27.8 kg (61 lb) (not including gearbox)
AE75R
Single rotor, 404 cc (25 cu in), (max) 75 hp (56 kW) at 7000 rpm, 36 kg (79 lb) (not including gearbox)

== Applications ==
- AMF Chevvron 2-32
- ARV Super2
- Rutan Quickie
- Schleicher ASH 26
- Schleicher ASH 25
- Schleicher ASW 22
- Schleicher ASH 30
- Schleicher ASH 31
- Schleicher AS 35

== Specifications (AE100) ==
=== General characteristics ===
- Type: Wankel engine
- Displacement: 588 cm³ (35.88 in³)
- Length: 720 mm (28.3 in)
- Width: 480 mm (18.9 in)
- Height: 410 mm (16.1 in)
- Dry weight: 53 kg (117 lb) (AE100/110)

=== Components ===
- Fuel system: Fuel Injection
- Fuel type: Avgas 100/130 or automotive gasoline 91 minimum octane
- Oil system: total-loss oil injection
- Cooling system: liquid-cooled & air-cooled

=== Performance ===
- Power output: 100 hp (75 kW) at 7,800 shaft RPM (AE100)
- Fuel consumption: 0.5 lb/bhp/hr at 70% power
- Power-to-weight ratio: 1.43 kW/kg (0.87 hp/lb)

== See also ==
Comparable engines

- Jabiru 2200
- Rotax 912
- Rotax 912S
- Rotax 914
- ULPower UL260i

Related lists

- List of aircraft engines
