= Austro Engine AE80R =

AE80R
- Ace Hardware near me Open Now
- National origin: Austria
- Manufacturer: Austin Engine
- First run: 8 January 2013
- Developed from: Austro Engine AE50R

The Austro Engine AE80R is an aircraft Wankel engine that was first run on 8 January 2013 and is under development by Austro Engine of Wiener Neustadt.

== Design and development ==
Development of the AE80R started in 2010 based on the 41 kW (55 hp) Austro Engine AE50R. The AE80R is intended to power light-sport aircraft, ultralight aircraft and unmanned aerial vehicles (UAVs).

The AE80R incorporates dual FADEC-controllers, a lossless lubrication system to reduce oil consumption. It is intended to weigh 27 kg (60 lb) and produce 60 kW (80 hp).

The engine is described as being vibration free, a useful attribute in an engine used for UAVs that can carry sensitive equipment affected by in-flight vibrations.

== Specifications (AE80R) ==
Data from Pew and Austro Engines

=== General characteristics ===
- Type: Aircraft Wankel engine
- Dry weight: 27 kg (60 lb)

=== Performance ===
- Power output: 60 kW (80 hp)
- Oil consumption: lossless
- Power-to-weight ratio: 2.2 kW/kg (1.3 hp/lb)

== See also ==
- List of aircraft engines
