= Schleicher ASG 32 =

German glider / motor glider, 2014

ASG 32
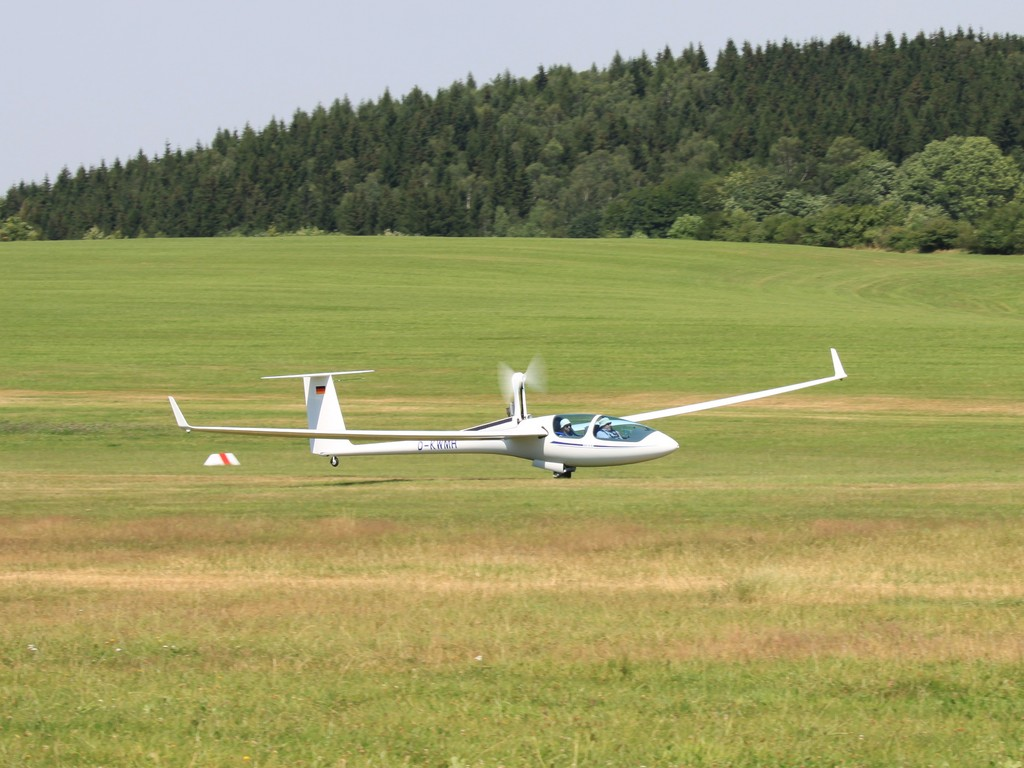
- An ASG 32 Mi taking off under own power

General information
- Type: Two Seater Class sailplane
- National origin: Germany
- Manufacturer: Schleicher
- Designer: Michael Greiner

History
- First flight: 31 May 2014

The ASG 32 is a Two Seater Class glider manufactured by Alexander Schleicher. The prototype had its maiden flight in Poppenhausen on 31 May 2014. Deliveries began in 2015.

== Design and development ==
The ASG 32 is a two-seat, mid-wing sailplane of composite construction, featuring a retractable landing wheel and a horizontal tail mounted atop the vertical fin (T-tail).

The aircraft was announced in April 2013, with the intention that it would fill the gap between the ASK 21 trainer and the larger Schleicher ASH 30 Open Class two seater. The ASG 32 meets the requirements of the FAI 20 metre Two-Seater Class. Pure sailplane, motorized self-launching and sustainer engine versions were announced.

Construction of the prototype started in 2013, during which the fuselage and tailplane were displayed. The maiden flight was on 31 May 2014, piloted by the designer Michael Greiner and the Schleicher CEO, Peter Kremer.

The electrically powered variant of the ASG 32 was scheduled for delivery after the other variants.

The ASG 32 and ASG 32 Mi were awarded an EASA Type Certificate on 11 February 2016.

== Variants ==
Data from Schleicher

ASG 32
The pure sailplane, without any engine.
ASG 32 Mi
The motor glider aircraft, capable of self launching with a retractable engine and propeller mounted in the centre fuselage.
ASG 32 El
The electrically propelled motor glider aircraft, capable of sustaining flight for an expected 100 km (62 mi) under engine power.

== Specifications (ASG 32 Mi) ==
Data from Schleicher

General characteristics

- Crew: Two
- Length: 9.07 m (29 ft 9 in) (fuselage)
- Wingspan: 20 m (65 ft 7 in)
- Height: 1.84 m (6 ft 0 in)
- Wing area: 15.7 m^{2} (169 sq ft)
- Empty weight: 545 kg (1,202 lb) (approx.)
- Max takeoff weight: 850 kg (1,874 lb)
- Pilot Capacity: One or two people, up to 120 kg (265 lb) each
- Powerplant: 1 × Austro Engine IAE 50R-AA single rotor Wankel engine, 41 kW (55 hp)
- Propellers: 2-bladed Schleicher AS2F1-1/R153-92-N1, 1.53 m (5 ft 0 in) diameter (retractable)

Performance

- Maximum speed: 180 km/h (110 mph, 97 kn) with propeller extended
- Never exceed speed: 270 km/h (170 mph, 150 kn)
- Maximum glide ratio: 52
- Wing loading: 54.1 kg/m^{2} (11.1 lb/sq ft) (max.)
- Min. wing loading: 33.8 kg/m^{2} (6.9 lb/sq ft) with one 70 kg (155 lb) pilot

== See also ==
Related lists

- List of gliders
- Schempp-Hirth Arcus
