= Hewland =

British engineering company

Hewland Engineering Ltd.
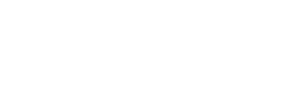
- Type: Private company
- Industry: Automotive
- Founded: Maidenhead, 1957
- Founder: Mike Hewland
- Headquarters: Maidenhead, England
- Area served: Worldwide
- Key people: William Hewland
- Products: Transmissions, Electronic Data Acquisition and Control Systems
- Services: High Performance engineering
- Number of employees: 130
- Website: Hewland Engineering Ltd.

Hewland is a British engineering company, founded in 1957 by Mike Hewland, which specialises in racing-car gearboxes. Hewland currently employ 130 people at their Maidenhead facility and have diversified into a variety of markets being particularly successful in electric vehicle transmission supply.

Hewland are currently supplying into Formula 1, Formula E, DTM, LMP, Rallycross, Prototype and GT Sportscar. At the beginning of 2021 Hero Motors Company bought a stake in Hewland.

== History ==
Mike Hewland ran a small engineering business at Maidenhead in the UK with a speciality in gear cutting. In 1959, Bob Gibson-Jarvie, the Chief Mechanic of UDT Laystall racing team running Cooper F2 cars, sought help from Hewland as gearbox troubles were experienced. The result of this request came out as six successful gearboxes being designed and built in 1959, and Hewland was in the gearbox business.

The first transaxle product, the Hewland Mk.I of 1960, was a minor modification of the Volkswagen Beetle 4 speed transaxle used upside-down with custom made differential housing side plates for the midship engine Lola Mk.III (John Young tuned Ford 105E 997cc pushrod) built for the new Formula Junior rules (1 litre engine with minimum weight 360 kg, or 1.1 litre with minimum 400 kg) in 1961. Hewland Mk.II was a similar 4 speed transaxle with more modifications for Coventry Climax engined Elva Mk.VI 1.1 litre sports racer in 1961.

Hewland Mk.III of 1962 became the first product for the public, which used the magnesium alloy case of the Beetle transaxle to house 5 pairs of bespoke straight-cut constant mesh spur gears with dog rings operated by custom-made brass shift forks. Gear selector shaft was located in the nose housing, unmodified as in the Beetle set up, facing rear-ward at the tail end of the box in the front-side-back position on a midship engine racing cars. The elimination of synchromesh parts provided the space for an additional pair of gears for the 5th speed.

This Mk.III became very popular for small displacement formula cars and racing sports cars, and was the basis on which all the later products were built.

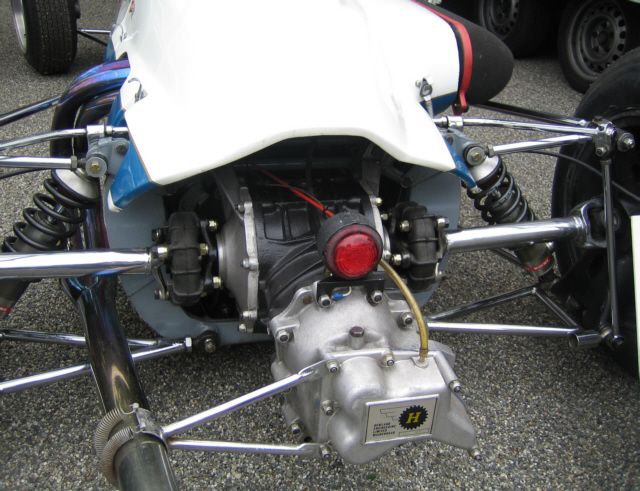
Hewland Mk.IV on 1964 Lotus 32. The product that built the reputation and the dominant market position for Hewland.

Mk.IV had the tail casing made by Hewland, with the selector rod located in the right side lower position, facing forward. This made the shifter linkage design easier on the part of chassis manufacturers. Together with its high torque version Mk.V, Mk.IV became a big seller, putting Hewland on a growing track.

Mk.VI of 1965 was an improved version of Mk.IV, which established Hewland as the dominant volume production transaxle manufacturer in the small displacement midship-engine racing car market, helped by the de facto standard usage in the newly born Formula Ford series. Although Formula Ford engines displaced 1.6-litre, the capacity was not a problem as the 1.5-litre rating was for higher power racing engines as opposed to the single carburetor, production cam and compression ratio regulation of the formula.

The advantages of the series were:

- Dog-ring gear selection made it extremely quick shifting.
- The structure that enabled changing of gear ratios on the 2nd through 5th speeds possible without removing the transaxle from the vehicle, or detaching it from the engine.
- Upside-down usage enabled the dry sump racing engines to be mounted low on the chassis.
- The 3rd, 4th and the 5th gears had the same thickness and drive/driven axis distance, thus were interchangeable.
- Magnesium alloy Volkswagen case made it strong and very light weight.

Hewland was claimed to be the first company that made racing car gearboxes, however, a transaxle housed in an aluminium alloy case for racing purpose in midship-engine configuration had been designed by Ferdinand Porsche and built by Horch in 1933 as a part of Auto Union Type A.
Valerio Colotti had been producing gearboxes for racing purposes before 1959, and his transaxle for midship-engine racing cars debuted on 10 May 1959 at Monaco Grand Prix on Behra-Porsche. Colotti 5 speed T.32 transaxle, which weighed less than 35 kg, was in use by Rob Walker in 1960. Lotus Engineering made a transaxle for front-engine Lotus 12 in 1957 designed by Richard Ansdale and Harry Mundy, and this gearbox/differential unit was adopted to midship-engine use for Lotus 18 which debuted on 8 April 1960.

Hewland dominated the racing scenes in the 1960s, 70s, 80s and 90s, and still is a leading company in racing transmissions with its focus shifted a bit toward custom engineering work for vehicle manufacturers. In addition to the traditional manual transmission products covering almost all the racing and rallying classes, Hewland now offers complete semi-automatic transmission system components, including shift actuators, throttle actuators, compressors, shift position sensors and steering wheel paddle-shift systems.

== Transaxle types ==
The following is the list of the smaller product range housed in Volkswagen case except for LD200.

Type	Year	Rating	sp.	Weight	Description
Mk.I	1960	1500cc	4	72 lbs	Custom side plates and unequal-length output shafts for Lola Mk.III
Mk.II	1961	1500cc	4	72 lbs	Custom for Elva Mk.VI, VW gears and differential
Mk.III	1962	1500cc	5	70 lbs	"Hewland quick-change gears", VW differential, tail-shifter
Mk.IV	1963	1500cc	5	70 lbs	GKN (Ford Zephyr) diff., forward-facing selector on the right side, Metalastic doughnut
Mk.V	1963	1600cc	5	75 lbs	"High torque", thicker gears and layshaft for Cosworth Mk.XII and XIII
Mk.VI	1965	1500cc	5	75 lbs	Improved Mk.IV for F3 and later FF. Metalastic doughnut attachment
Mk.VII	1968	1000cc	6	72 lbs	6 speed version of Mk.VI for 1 Litre F2
Mk.8	1968	1500cc	5	70 lbs	Hewland diff. on taper roller bearings, all gear-hubs splined to pinion shaft
Mk.9	1973	1500cc	5	70 lbs	Double row output shaft bearing for Spicer halfshafts, side plates for inboard disc brake
LD200	1988	150 lb/ft	5	63 lbs	Complete redesign of Mk.9 housed in Hewland case

Transmission capacity is measured by the maximum output torque (not the horsepower), which is the product of the input torque times overall reduction ratio. However, as the output torque is proportional to the input torque with typical gear and differential reduction ratios, and as the input torque (engine output torque) is roughly proportional to the engine displacement, Hewland used to indicate the maximum allowable engine size, and later the maximum input torque measured in Lbs/ft., as the transaxle selection guide.

The following is the list of larger product range up to 1981.

Type	Year	Rating	sp.	Weight	Description
HD	1963	300 lb/ft	4	85 lbs	"Hewland Design", bespoke casing, alternative to ERSA Knight
HD5	1963	200 lb/ft	5	85 lbs	5 speed version of HD
LG	1966	600 lb/ft	2	136 lbs	"Large Gearbox" for Indy, internal oil pump
FT200	1966	200 lb/ft	5	90 lbs	All new HD5, big seller
LG500	1967	500 lb/ft	4	136 lbs	4 speed LG, LSD or 'Power-Loc' for CanAm
FG400	1968	280 lb/ft	5	110 lbs	FT gears with LG diff. for DFV
LG600	1968	600 lb/ft	5	145 lbs	5 speed LG500, longer bearing carrier, for F5000 and CanAm
DG300	1969	300 lb/ft	5	117 lbs	"Different Gearbox", LG diff., internal oil pump, for F1 and sports cars
LG2	1971	700 lb/ft	2	138 lbs	Second generation of LG, for Indy
LG Mk.II	1971	600 lb/ft	4/5	140 lbs	Second generation of LG600, new case, selector rod and diff.
DG300 Mk.II	1972	300 lb/ft	5	118 lbs	Second generation of DG300
FGA	1972	280 lb/ft	5/6	110 lbs	Second generation of FG400, for DFV; the six-speed version appeared during 1977
FGB	1978	260 lb/ft	6	112 lbs	Lower ratio FGA, larger case for bigger diameter gears, for high rev. turbo F1
DGB	1981	440 lb/ft	5	134 lbs	Higher torque version of DG300 Mk.II, stronger case, for sports car endurance
VG	1981	600 lb/ft	5	167 lbs	Higher torque version of DGB

== ARV Super2 ==
After an approach from Richard Noble, Hewland was persuaded to design and build the AE75, a 75 bhp aero-engine for Noble ARV Super2, a 2-seater light aircraft. This engine, an inverted three-cylinder water-cooled two-stroke unit with dual ignition and a 2.7:1 reduction gearbox, was developed from Hewland's existing two-cylinder microlight engine. The AE75 was very light at 49 kg (108 lb), thereby contributing to the overall lightness of the aircraft, so that the ARV Super2 weighed 40% less than its competitor, the Cessna 152.

== Track day cars ==
Hewland has been involved with various track day cars. Most notably the Caparo T1 and BAC Mono, both of which featured gearboxes designed and manufactured by the company.

== Formula E ==
Hewland have been involved in the Formula E racing series since its inauguration, supplying the full grid of competitors with transmissions. Currently Hewland are still a key supplier into this series.

== Electric Vehicles ==
Hewland provided a custom high torque transmission for the World record breaking Buckeye Bullet 3 which currently holds the electric land speed record at 549.4 km/h (341.4 mph).

== Sleeve valve ==
In an interview in Car&Driver magazine in July 1974, M Hewland discussed his work and that of his head engineer John Logan on a 500 cc, single-cylinder, sleeve valve engine, coming from his experience inside a 'Mobile Labor Force' at Bristol during WW II, research aimed at Formula 1. Hewland claimed having got 70-73 HP, 47.5 Lb.ft, with a fuel economy of .45 lb/HP/Hr in the racing version, and .39 in an economy engine.

== See also ==
- ZF Friedrichshafen
- Colotti Trasmissioni
