= Swan 80-2 =

Sailboat class

Development
- Designer: Germán Frers
- Location: Finland
- Year: 2010
- No. built: 5 (FD model)
- Builder: Oy Nautor AB
- Role: Cruiser-Racer
- Name: Swan 80-2

Boat
- Displacement: 79,150 lb (35,902 kg)
- Draft: 13.12 ft (4.00 m)

Hull
- Type: monohull
- Construction: glassfibre
- LOA: 82.28 ft (25.08 m)
- LWL: 72.80 ft (22.19 m)
- Beam: 19.95 ft (6.08 m)
- Engine: Steyr Motors GmbH MO196 190 hp (142 kW) diesel engine

Hull appendages
- Keel: Fin keel
- Ballast: 39,683 lb (18,000 kg)
- Rudder: Skeg-mounted/Spade-type/Transom-mounted rudder

Rig
- Rig type: Bermuda rig
- I foretriangle height: 104.98 ft (32.00 m)
- J foretriangle base: 30.84 ft (9.40 m)
- P mainsail luff: 99.41 ft (30.30 m)
- E mainsail foot: 34.10 ft (10.39 m)

Sails
- Sailplan: Masthead sloop
- Mainsail area: 1,694.94 sq ft (157.465 m^{2})
- Jib/genoa area: 1,618.79 sq ft (150.391 m^{2})
- Total sail area: 3,313.73 sq ft (307.856 m^{2})

The Swan 80-2 is a Finnish maxi yacht sailboat that was designed by Germán Frers as a cruiser-racer and first built in 2010. The design was built in two models, with two different decks, the "FD" with a flush deck and the "S" with a raised salon.

The design was originally marketed by the manufacturer as the Swan 80, but is now usually referred to as the Swan 80-2 to differentiate it from the unrelated 1999 Swan 80 Frers design.

== Production ==
The design was built by Oy Nautor AB in Finland, from 2010 to 2012, but it is now out of production. There were five FD models built.

== Design ==
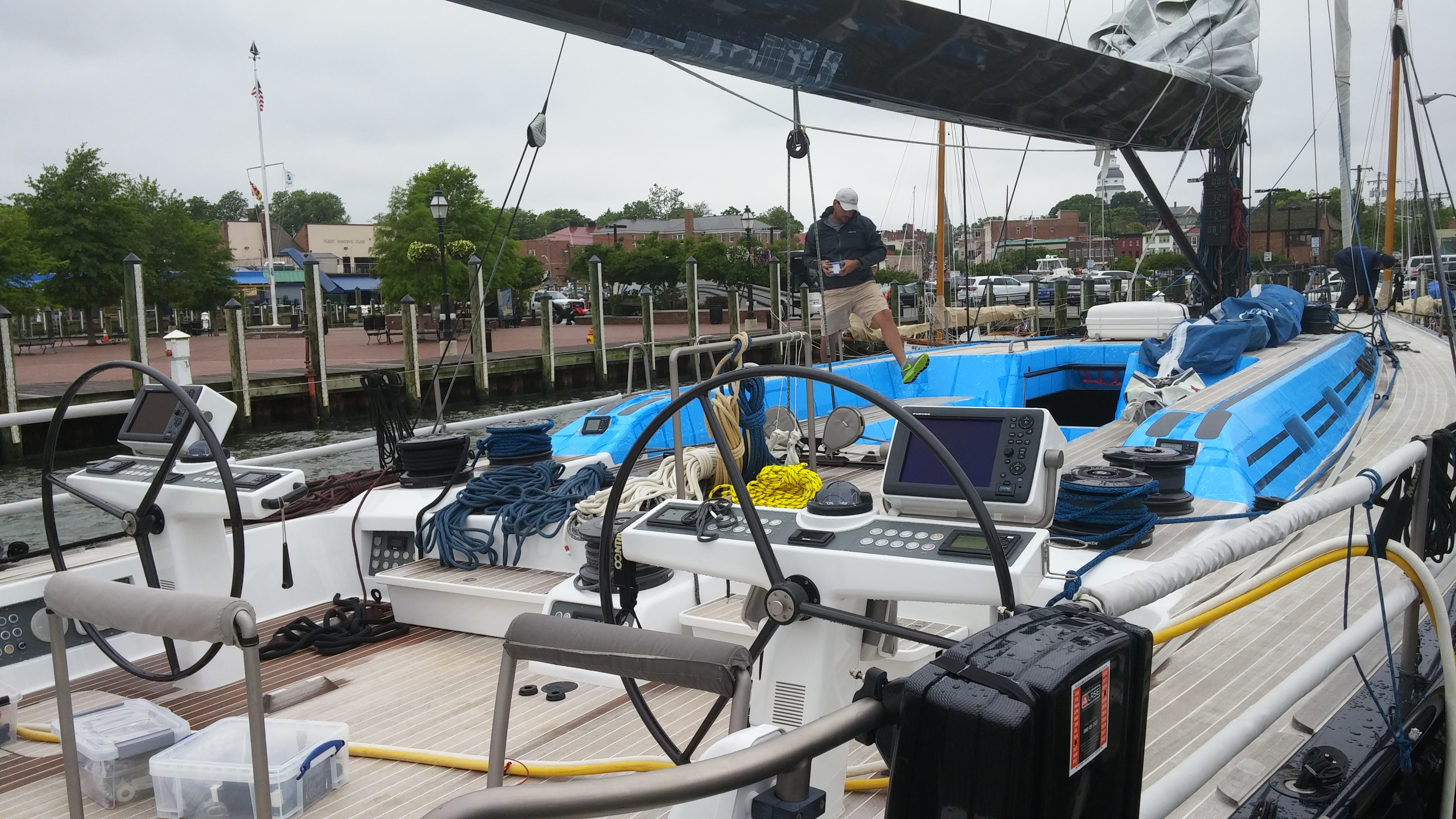
Swan 80-2 FD cockpit

The Swan 80-2 is a recreational keelboat, built predominantly of glassfibre, with wood trim. It has a masthead sloop rig, a slightly raked stem, a reverse transom with a drop-down tailgate swimming platform and dinghy garage, an internally mounted spade-type rudder controlled by dual wheels and a fixed fin keel with a weighted bulb. It displaces 79,150 lb (35,902 kg) and carries 39,683 lb (18,000 kg) of lead ballast. Factory options included titanium hardware and a dodger that retracts into the deck.

Both the flush deck Swan 80 FD and the raised salon "S" model have the same specifications, with only the installed deck varying.

The boat has a draft of 13.12 ft (4.00 m).

The boat is fitted with an Austrian Steyr Motors GmbH MO196 190 hp (142 kW) diesel engine for docking and manoeuvring. The fuel tank holds 396 U.S. gallons (1,500 L; 330 imp gal) and the fresh water tank has a capacity of 317 U.S. gallons (1,200 L; 264 imp gal).

The design was offered with a choice of custom interior layouts. A typical interior has sleeping accommodation for seven people in four cabins, with two bunk beds in the bow cabin, a double berth in the forward cabin, two straight settees in the main cabin, a midship cabin on the port side with a single and an aft cabin with a central double island berth. The galley is located on the port side forward of the main cabin. The galley is of double straight configuration and is equipped with a four-burner stove, an ice box and a double sink. A navigation station is on the starboard side of the companionway. There are four heads, one for each cabin.

The design has a hull speed of 11.43 kn (21.17 km/h).

== Operational history ==
A Boat International article named the Swan 80 as one of the "6 of the best Nautor's Swan sailing yachts", noting "the Swan 80 maxi-cruiser is the ideal pocket sailing superyacht for the owner who wants to be able to race or cruise in style. Two cockpits allow guests to unwind and stay out of the way during racing action."

== See also ==
- List of sailing boat types
