= Schleicher ASH 26 =

German glider / motor glider family by Alexander Schleicher, 1993

ASH 26
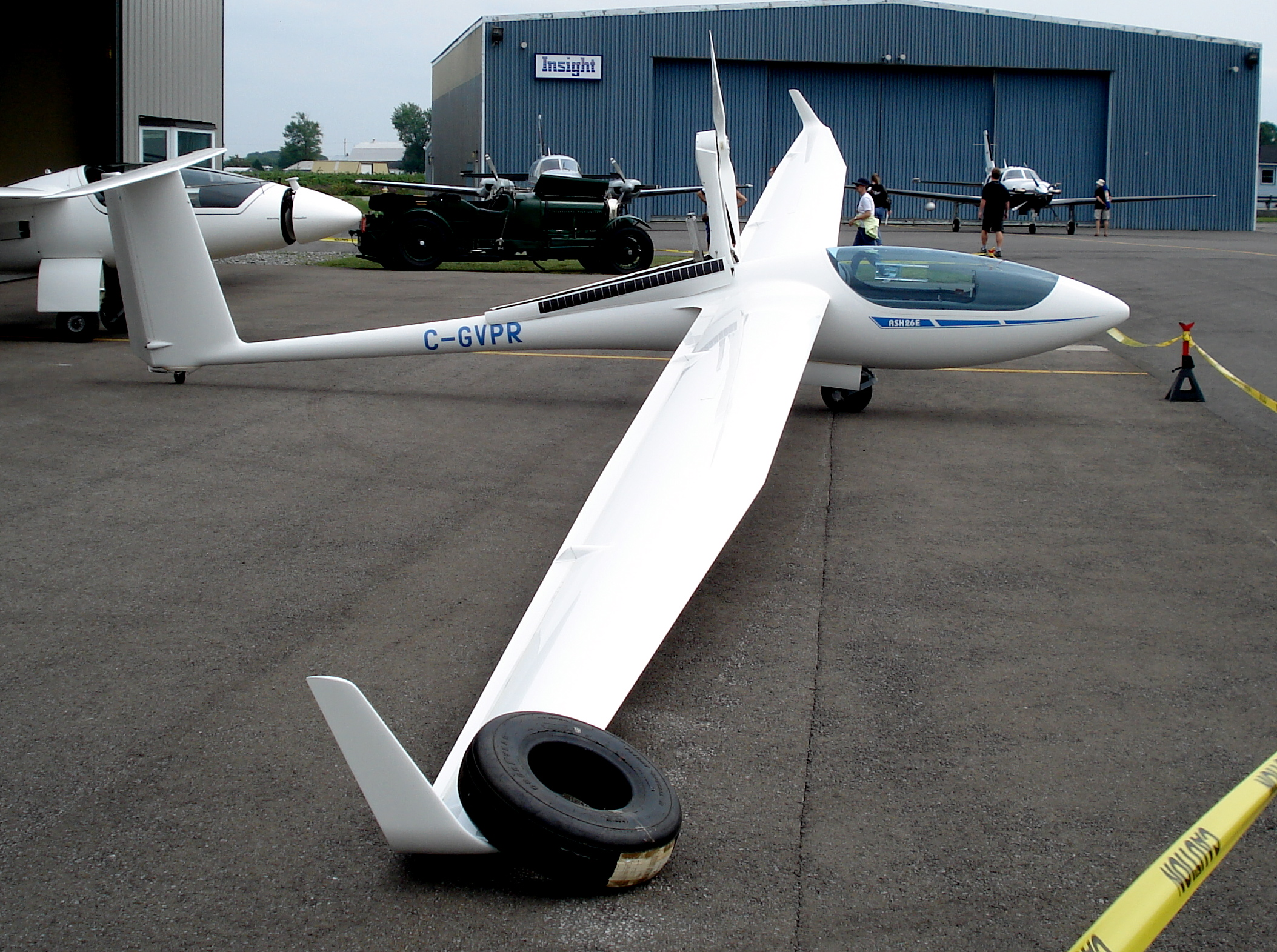
- ASH 26 E

General information
- Type: 18 metre Class sailplane
- National origin: Germany
- Manufacturer: Schleicher
- Designer: Martin Heide
- Number built: 258 (ASH 26 E, as of June 2018)

History
- First flight: 1993
- Developed into: ASH 31

The ASH 26 is an 18 metre Class glider, built of modern fibre reinforced composites. It first flew in 1993. It is manufactured by Alexander Schleicher GmbH & Co. The 'H' indicates this is a design of Martin Heide.

The ASH 26 has plain flaps, a retractable undercarriage and a water ballast system. The structure is a complex composite of carbon, aramid and polyethylene fibre reinforced plastic. The wings have pneumatic turbulators. Of the ASH 26s sold, over 90% are the self-launching version, the ASH 26 E; the engine being a liquid cooled Diamond (now Austro Engine) AE50R Wankel rotary engine.

== Variants ==
ASH 26
Production variant with 18-metre wingspan.
ASH 26 E
Production variant, self launching utilising the 37 kW (50 hp) AE50R engine.

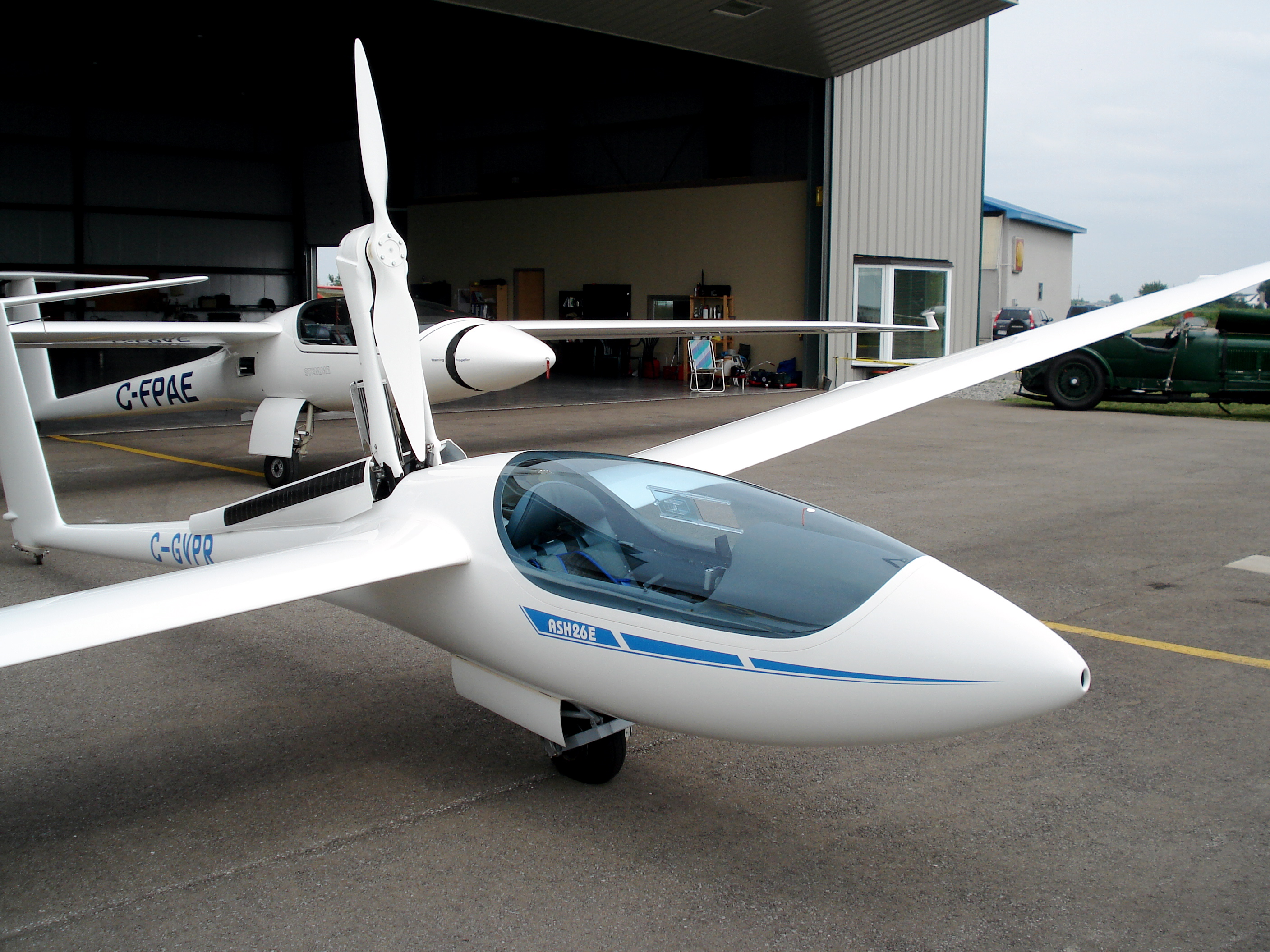

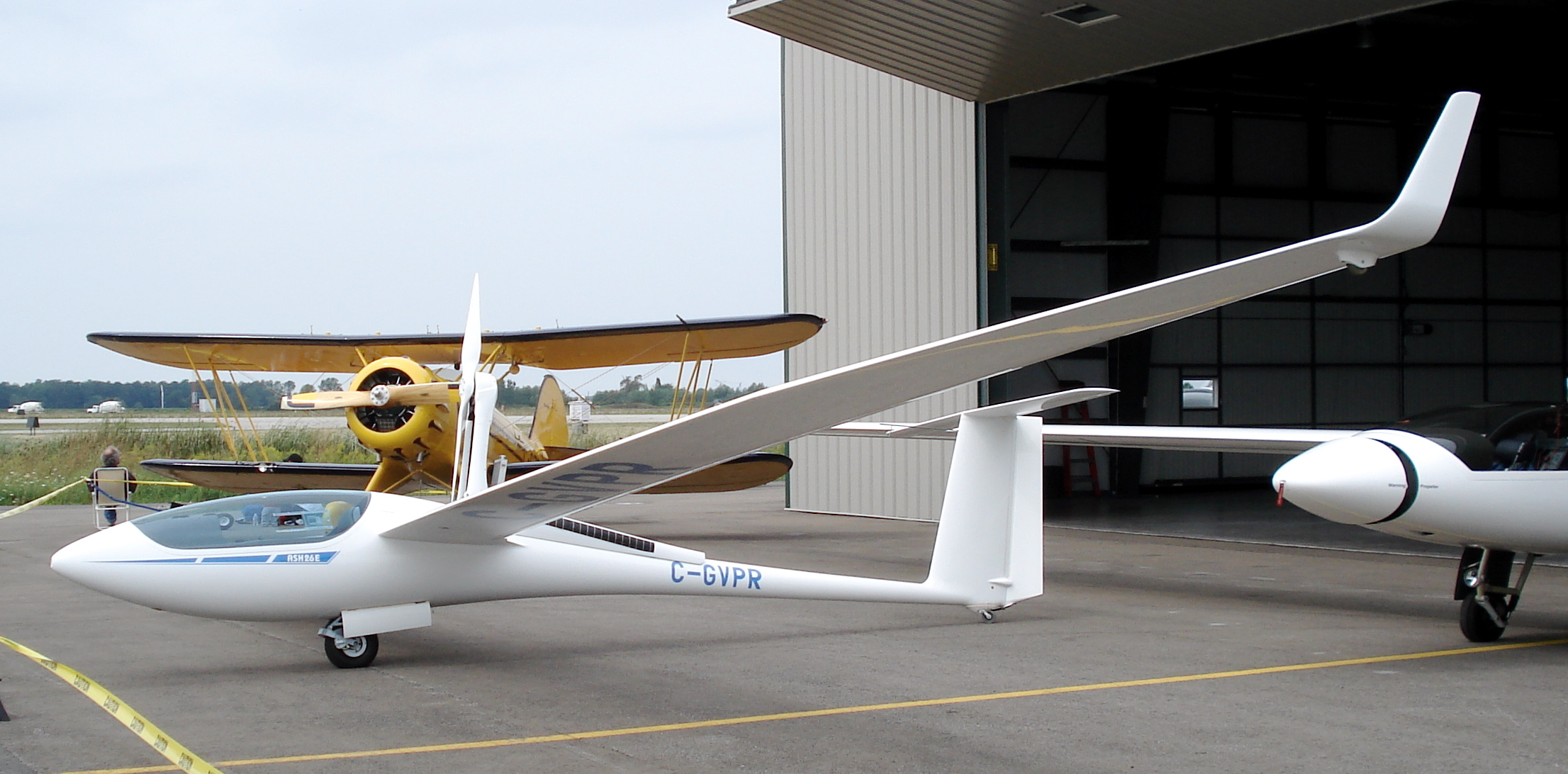

== Specifications (ASH 26 E) ==
Data from Jane's all the world's aircraft, 1992–93, Schleicher ASH 26 E / ASH 26 brochure

General characteristics

- Crew: 1
- Capacity: 110 kg (240 lb) water ballast
- Length: 7.55 m (24 ft 9 in)
- Wingspan: 18 m (59 ft 1 in)
- Height: 1.51 m (4 ft 11 in)
- Wing area: 11.68 m^{2} (125.7 sq ft)
- Aspect ratio: 27.69
- Airfoil: DU 89-134/14
- Empty weight: 325 kg (717 lb)
- Max takeoff weight: 525 kg (1,157 lb)
- Fuel capacity: maximum: 46 L (12 US gal; 10 imp gal) ; fuselage tank only: 16 L (4.2 US gal; 3.5 imp gal)
- Powerplant: 1 × Austro Engine AE50R liquid-cooled Wankel rotary engine, 37 kW (50 hp)
- Propellers: 2-bladed Alexander Schleicher, 1.55 m (5 ft 1 in) diameter

Performance

- Stall speed: 71 km/h (44 mph, 38 kn)
- Never exceed speed: 280 km/h (170 mph, 150 kn)
- Maximum glide ratio: 50:1 at 115 km/h (71 mph; 62 kn)
- Rate of climb: 4 m/s (790 ft/min) powered
- Rate of sink: 0.48 m/s (94 ft/min) and 1.75 m/s (5.7 ft/s) at 200 km/h (120 mph; 110 kn)
- Wing loading: 45 kg/m^{2} (9.2 lb/sq ft)
