= Cavalry Corps (Ireland) =

Irish Army combat support corps

Irish Army Cavalry Corps
- Irish: An Cór Marcra
- Collar badge of the Cavalry Corps
- Active: 1934 – present
- Country: Ireland
- Branch: Army
- Type: Armoured
- Role: Light Cavalry; Armoured Reconnaissance; ISTAR
- Size: Three squadrons
- Part of: Defence Forces
- Garrison/HQ: 1st Armoured Cavalry Squadron - Curragh Camp; 1st Cavalry Squadron - Cork; 2nd Cavalry Squadron - Rathmines
- Nickname: "The Cav"
- Mottos: Through the mud and blood to the green fields beyond
- Website: www.military.ie/en/who-we-are/army/army-corps/cavalry-corps/

Insignia
- Headdress: Glengarry
- Flag
- Abbreviation: CAV

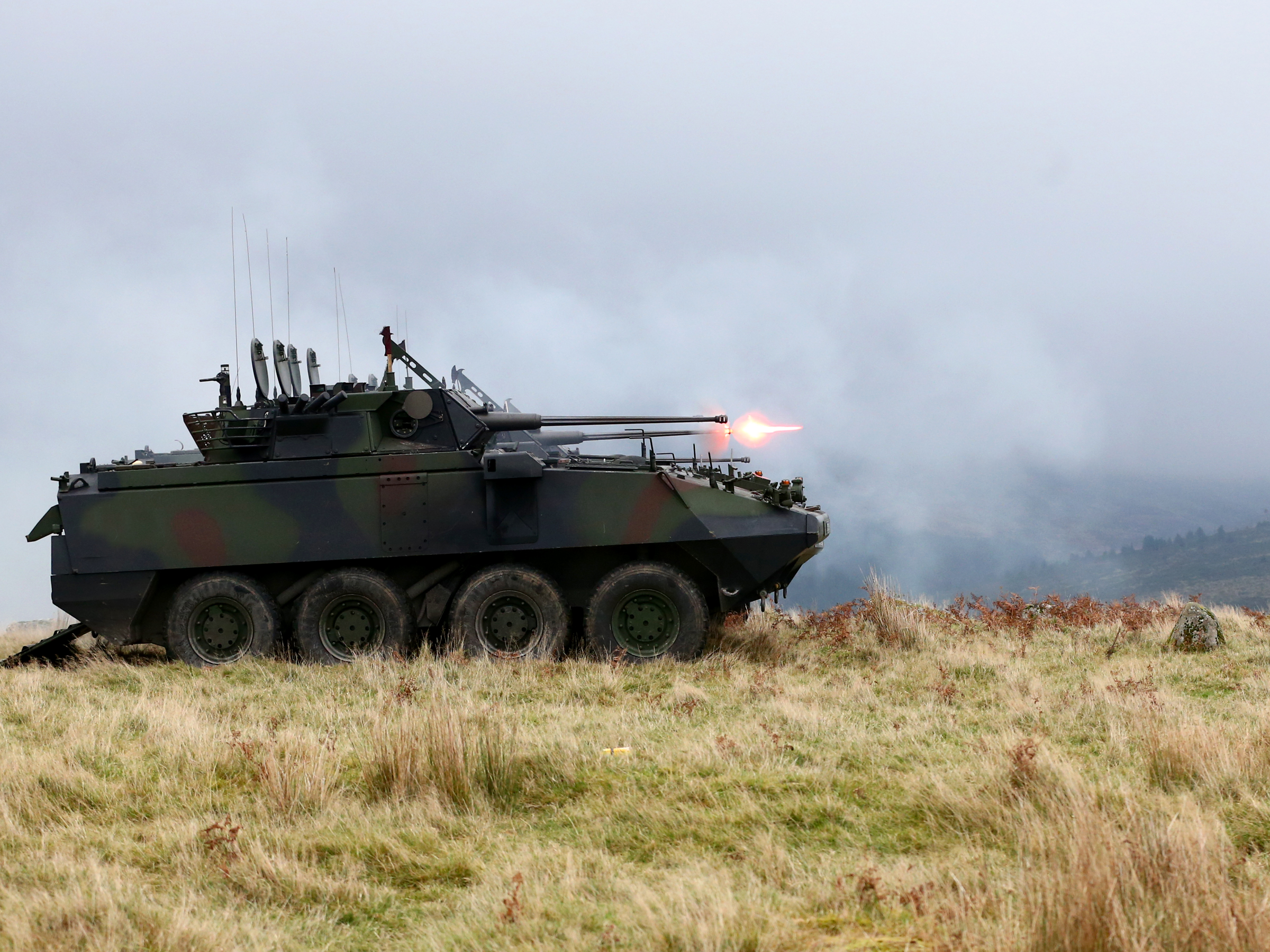
Cavalry Corps MOWAG Piranha IIIH Medium Reconnaissance Vehicle (MRV) on a shoot in the Glen of Imaal

The Cavalry Corps (CAV) (Irish: An Cór Marcra) is one of the combat support corps of the Irish Army. In peacetime, the Cavalry carries out various duties in Aid to the Civil Power, such as:

- Border operations supporting Gardaí.
- Escort duties - cash, explosives, VIP, prisoner.
- Patrolling Government installations.
- Intelligence, surveillance, target acquisition, and reconnaissance.

For this, the corps is equipped with various light armoured vehicles including the Mowag Piranha and RG-32M Light Tactical Armoured Vehicle, which are utilised as part of the light cavalry mission, in support of the infantry.

== History ==
The Cavalry Corps traces its history to the formation of the Armoured Car Corps on 14 September 1922. Mechanised from the start, the corps used armoured vehicles that the British Army left following the War of Independence. Following a debate on the use of the term "cavalry", and whether the word was meant to encompass horse, wheeled or tracked, the corps was renamed the Cavalry Corps in 1934.

The first Landsverk L60 was delivered in 1935 and joined Ireland's only other tank, a Vickers Mk. D in the 2nd Armoured Squadron. The second Landsverk L60 arrived in 1936. The Landsverk's were still in use up until the late 1960s. One L60 is preserved in running order and the other is in the National Museum of Ireland, Collins Barracks, Dublin.

After The Emergency, the corps established a main battle tank cadre equipped with the Churchill tank (total 4 tanks, in use 1948-1969), which formed the basis of the 1st Tank Squadron in 1959. This was equipped with the Comet tank (total 8 tanks, in use 1959-1973) until its disbandment in 1973.

The Cavalry Corps has served in many locations on UN peacekeeping missions, including the Congo, Cyprus and Lebanon, either as Cavalry groups on their own, or attached as part of a battalion group. In these deployments the Cavalry Corps were equipped with Panhard AML vehicles - prior to their retirement in 2013.

In February 2026, part of a military modernisation program which also involved acquiring a national primary radar system, it was announced that up to €600 million would be spent on purchasing hundreds of modern armored vehicles from French arms manufacturers such as Thales Group and KNDS, in an effort to transform the Irish Army from a light infantry defence force into an mechanised infantry combat force. Media reports identified the EBRC Jaguar armoured fighting vehicle, the VBMR Griffon armoured personnel carrier, the VBMR-L Serval multirole armoured vehicle and the CAESAR self-propelled howitzer as the vehicles likely to be acquired.

== Cavalry Corps today ==
The Cavalry Corps today is approximately equivalent in size to a single cavalry regiment; however, the Defence Forces have never used the regimental structure (although there was an attempt during 1942 to organise units into a cavalry regiment). Instead, cavalry operates as independent squadrons. Today, the army has a total of three cavalry squadrons:

- 1st Cavalry Squadron (1 CAV)
- 2nd Cavalry Squadron (2 CAV)
- 1st Armoured Cavalry Squadron (1 ACS)

The 1st, 2nd Squadrons are standard light cavalry units equipped with the Mowag Piranha AFV and other light armoured vehicles. One squadron is attached to each of the army's two infantry brigades to act as light armoured support. In addition to their regular duties, 2nd Cavalry Squadron also operates as the Presidential Motorcycle Escort, a task inherited from the Blue Hussars in 1948. The 1st Armoured Cavalry Squadron was formed in 1998 by the amalgamation of the 1st Armoured Car Squadron and the reformed 1st Tank Squadron. 1st Armoured Cavalry Squadron is an independent unit that is stationed at The Curragh.

Disbanded (Defence Forces Re-org 2012)

- 4th Cavalry Squadron, Athlone (2012)
- 31st Reserve Cavalry Squadron, Clonmel, Cork (2012)
- 54th Reserve Cavalry Squadron, Longford (2012)
- 62nd Reserve Cavalry Squadron, Dublin (2012)

The Army Reserve (AR) squadrons have been integrated with the Permanent Defence Forces (PDF) units as part of the "single force concept".

== Cavalry tasks ==
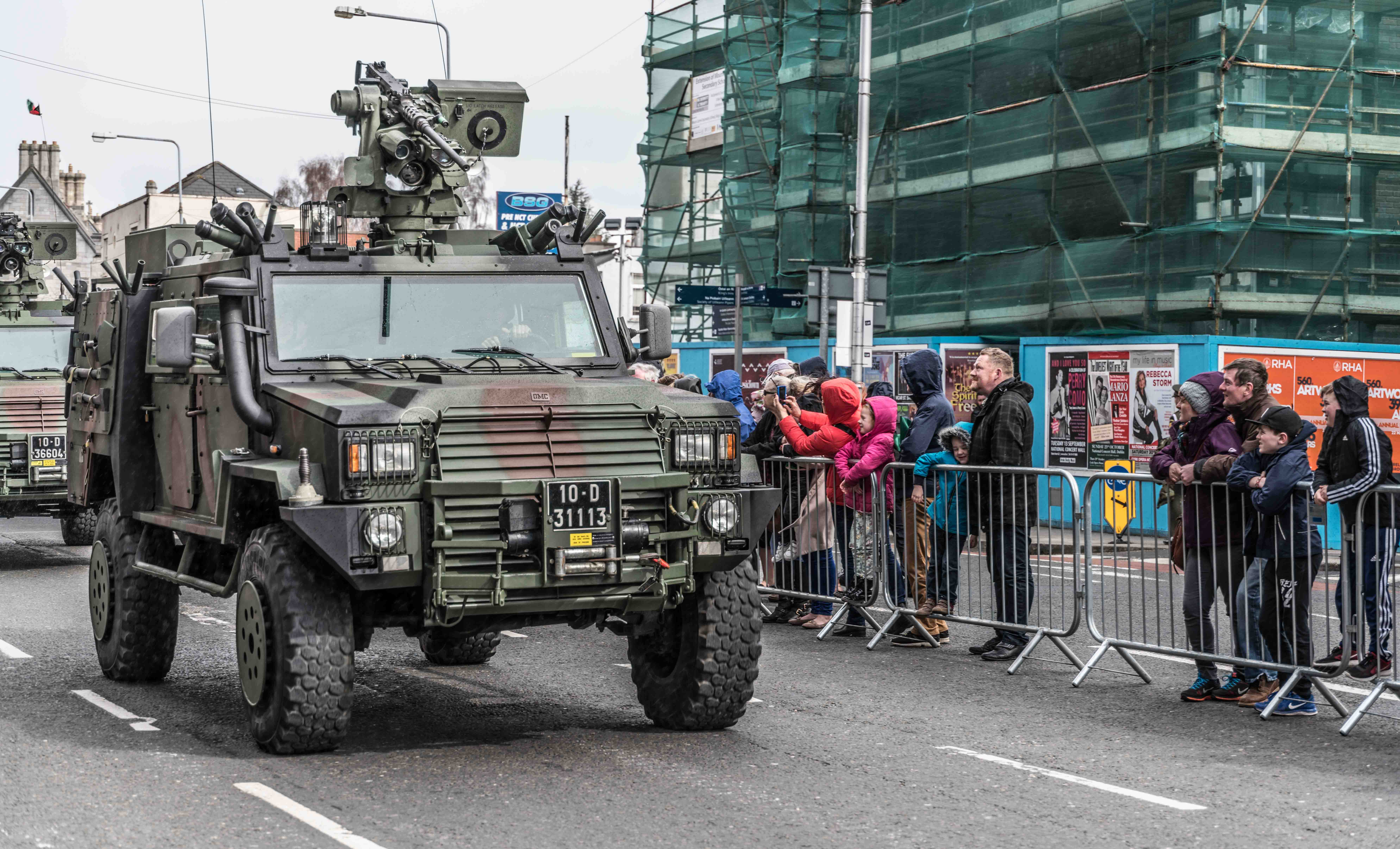
RG-32M Outrider, in use with the Cavalry Corps as a Light Tactical Armoured Vehicle (LTAV)

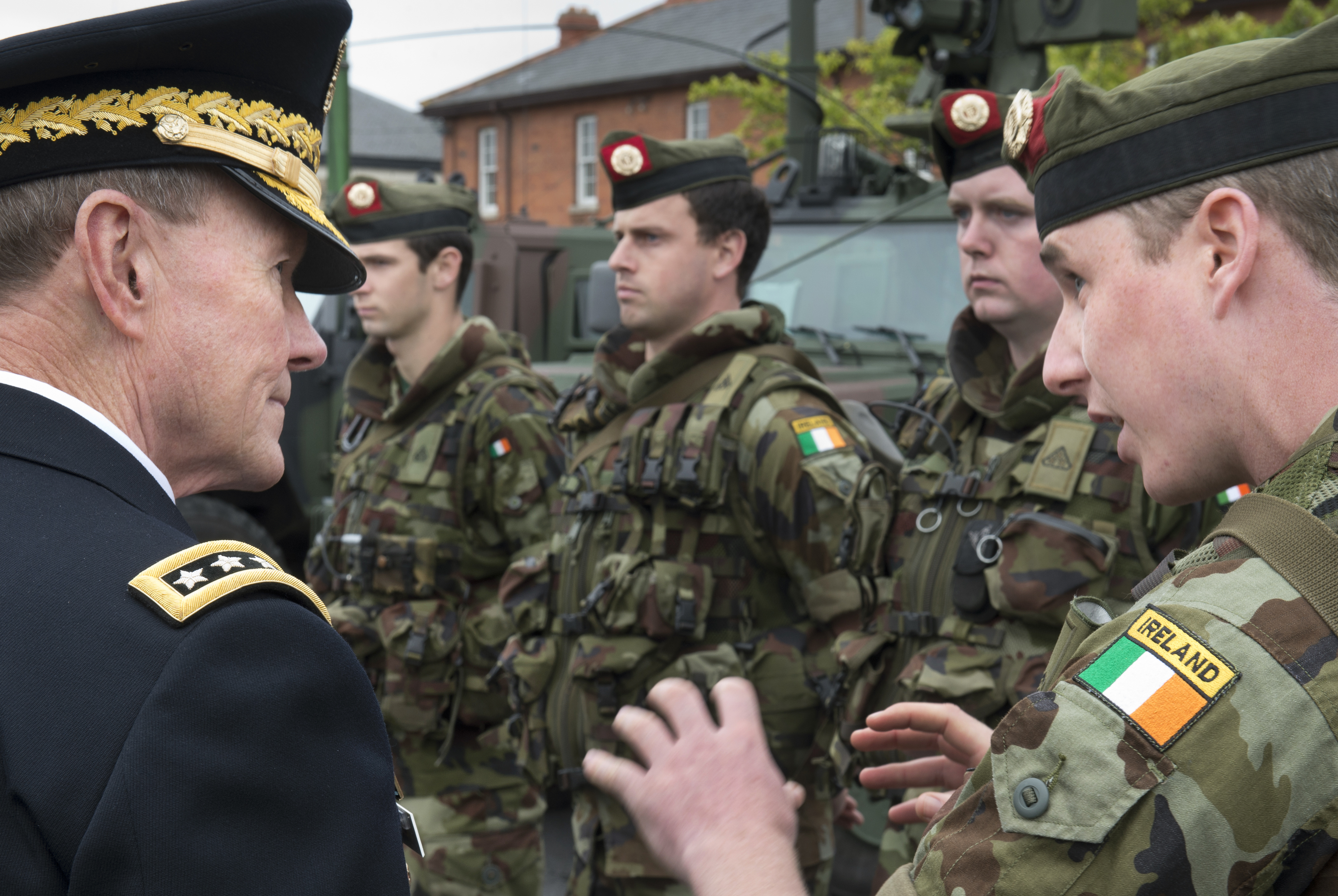
U.S. Army General Martin Dempsey being briefed by Cavalry Corps personnel in field dress and Glengarry headdress

- ISTAR (Intelligence, Surveillance, Target Acquisition & Reconnaissance)
  - CBRN (Chemical, Biological, Radiological & Nuclear) Recce
  - Obstacle Recce
  - Route Recce
  - Patrolling
  - Scouting
  - Observation Post (OP) Screen
  - Close Target Reconnaissance (CTR)
  - Control Measure Security & Marking
  - Location Recce
- Security/Protective
  - Screens
  - Advance & Rear Guard
  - Counter Recce
  - Deception
  - Anti-Airborne
  - Flank Protection
  - Rear Area & Supply Route Security
- Exploitation
  - Raids
  - Pursuit
  - Seize & Hold
  - Recce Strike
  - Delaying Action
- Secondary
  - Liaison
  - Traffic Regulation
  - Escort
  - Communications
