= Super two (disambiguation) =

A super two is a two-lane road built to high, but not expressway, standards.

Super two or Super 2 may also refer to:

- Super two (baseball), Major League Baseball salary arbitration eligibility
- Super2 Series, Australian motor racing series
- ARV Super2
