= Austro Engine GIAE110R =

Austrian aircraft engine

GIAE110R
- Type: Aircraft engine
- National origin: Austria
- Manufacturer: Austro Engine

The Austro Engine GIAE110R is an Austrian aircraft engine, designed and produced by Austro Engine of Wiener Neustadt for use in light aircraft.

As of 2015 the engine is not listed as available on the company website and may not have been developed past prototype stage.

== Design and development ==
The engine is a twin rotor four-stroke, air and liquid-cooled, 588 cc (35.9 cu in), gasoline Wankel engine design, with a mechanical gearbox reduction drive, employing a helical gear set, with reduction ratio of 2.96:1. It employs dual capacitor discharge ignition and produces 105 hp (78 kW) at 7500 rpm.

== Specifications (GIAE110R) ==
Data from World Directory of Leisure Aviation 2011-12

=== General characteristics ===
- Type: Twin rotor, four stroke Wankel aircraft engine
- Displacement: 588 cc (35.9 cu in)
- Length: 720 mm (28.3 in)
- Width: 530 mm (20.9 in)
- Height: 420 mm (16.5 in)
- Dry weight: 54 kg (119.0 lb)

=== Components ===
- Fuel type: gasoline
- Cooling system: liquid or air
- Reduction gear: mechanical gearbox, helical gear reduction drive, reduction ratio of 2.96:1

=== Performance ===
- Power output: 105 hp (78 kW) at 7500 rpm
- Compression ratio: 9.5:1

== See also ==
Related lists

- List of aircraft engines
