= Semi-monocoque =

Type of vehicle structure

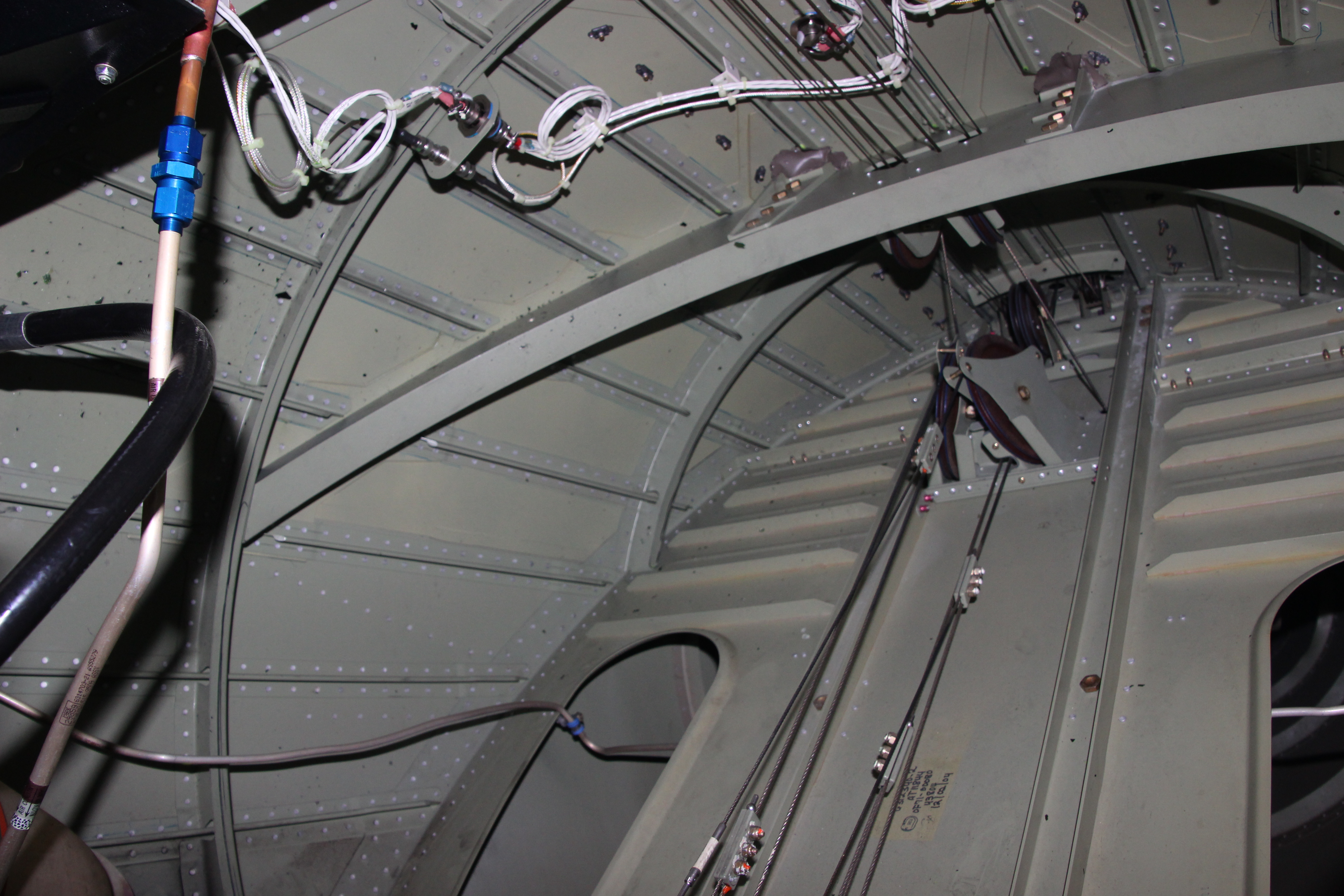
Semi-monocoque structure inside an aircraft's rear fuselage

ARV Super2 with semi-monocoque fuselage

The term semi-monocoque or semimonocoque refers to a stressed shell structure that is similar to a true monocoque, but which derives at least some of its strength from conventional reinforcement. Semi-monocoque construction is used for, among other things, aircraft fuselages, car bodies and motorcycle frames.

== Examples ==
Semi-monocoque aircraft fuselages differ from true monocoque construction through being reinforced with longitudinal stringers. The Mooney range of four seat aircraft, for instance, use a steel tube truss frame around the passenger compartment with monocoque behind.

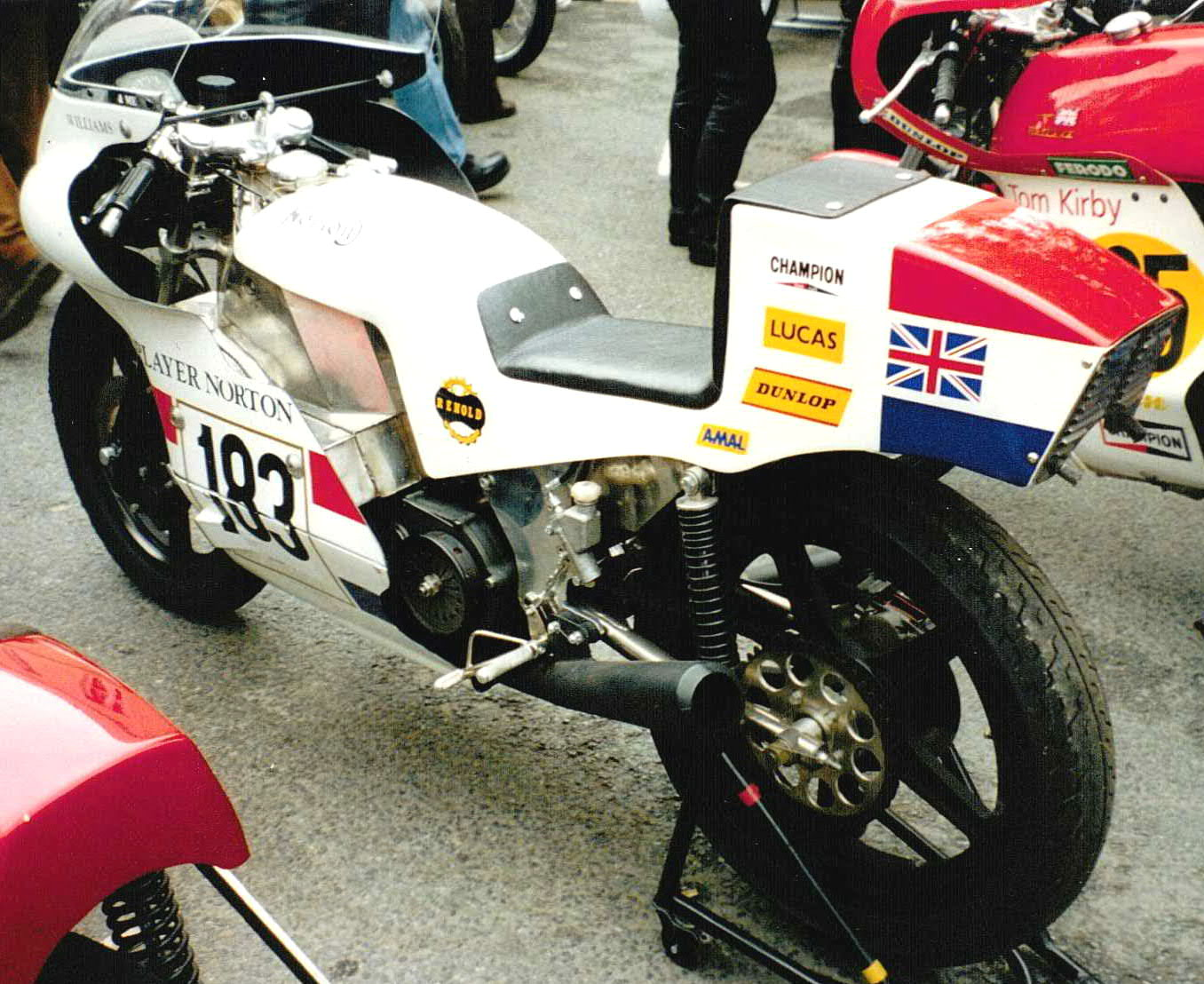
Peter Williams' 1973 John Player Norton 750 with sheet stainless steel semi-monocoque frame, exhibited at Castletown, Isle of Man in 1999

The British ARV Super2 light aircraft has a fuselage constructed mainly of aluminium alloy, but with some fibreglass elements. The cockpit is a stiff monocoque of "Supral" alloy, but aft of the cockpit bulkhead, the ARV is conventionally built, with frames, longerons and stressed skin forming a semi-monocoque.

Peter Williams' 1973 Formula 750 TT-winning John Player Norton racer was an early example of a semi-monocoque motorcycle.

== See also ==
- Monocoque
- Stressed skin
