= Swan 80 =

Sailboat class

Development
- Designer: Germán Frers
- Location: Finland
- Year: 1999
- No. built: 8
- Builder: Oy Nautor AB
- Role: Cruiser-Racer
- Name: Swan 80

Boat
- Displacement: 80,909 lb (36,700 kg)
- Draft: 13.78 ft (4.20 m)

Hull
- Type: monohull
- Construction: glassfibre
- LOA: 81.69 ft (24.90 m)
- LWL: 69.29 ft (21.12 m)
- Beam: 19.09 ft (5.82 m)
- Engine: Yanmar 4LHA-STE 240 hp (179 kW) diesel engine

Hull appendages
- Keel: Fin keel with a weighted bulb
- Ballast: 33,100 lb (15,014 kg)
- Rudder: Skeg-mounted/Spade-type/Transom-mounted rudder

Rig
- Rig type: Bermuda rig
- I foretriangle height: 104.98 ft (32.00 m)
- J foretriangle base: 30.84 ft (9.40 m)
- P mainsail luff: 99.41 ft (30.30 m)
- E mainsail foot: 34.10 ft (10.39 m)

Sails
- Sailplan: Masthead sloop
- Mainsail area: 1,594 sq ft (148.1 m^{2})
- Jib/genoa area: 1,730 sq ft (161 m^{2})
- Gennaker area: 5,664 sq ft (526.2 m^{2})
- Upwind sail area: 3,325 sq ft (308.9 m^{2})
- Downwind sail area: 7,258 sq ft (674.3 m^{2})

Racing
- PHRF: -75

The Swan 80 is a Finnish maxi yacht sailboat that was designed by Germán Frers as a cruiser-racer and first built in 1999.

The boat is sometimes confused with the later 2010 Swan 80, now often called the Swan 80-2.

== Production ==
The design was built by Oy Nautor AB in Finland, from 1999 to 2004. There were eight boats built over its six-year production run.

== Design ==
The Swan 80 is a recreational keelboat, built predominantly of glassfibre, with wood trim. It has a masthead sloop rig, with four sets of swept 17.5 degree spreaders and carbon fibre spars. The hull has a raked stem; a reverse transom; an internally mounted, spade-type, carbon fibre rudder controlled by a wheel and a fixed fin keel with a weighted bulb. It displaces 80,909 lb (36,700 kg) and carries 33,100 lb (15,014 kg) of lead ballast.

The design was built very light, compared to previous Swan designs, using a hull made from vinylester fibreglass, with Kevlar and E-glass reinforcements. The deck has carbon fibre reinforcement and a honeycomb core. The carbon fibre spars allow less ballast to be carried.

The boat has a draft of 13.78 ft (4.20 m) with the standard keel.

The boat is fitted with a Japanese Yanmar 4LHA-STE diesel engine of 240 hp (179 kW) for docking and manoeuvring. The fuel tank holds 528 U.S. gallons (2,000 L; 440 imp gal) and the fresh water tank has a capacity of 317 U.S. gallons (1,200 L; 264 imp gal).

The interior layouts vary, but a typical design has sleeping accommodation for ten people, with a double berth in the bow cabin, two forward cabins each with double berths, an L-shaped settee and a straight settee in the main cabin, a midship cabin to starboard with a double berth and an aft cabin with two bunk beds on the starboard side. The galley is located on the port side just aft of the companionway ladder and is an open "U"-shape. There are four heads, two of which are fitted with bath tubs.

For sailing downwind the design may be equipped with an asymmetrical spinnaker of 5,664 sq ft (526.2 m^{2}).

The design has a hull speed of 11.15 kn (20.65 km/h) and a PHRF handicap of -75.

== Operational history ==
The design has been raced with good success.

In a 1999 review, Bob Perry noted, "the Swan 80 comes standard with a carbon fiber mast. The SA/D is a whopping 24.67 with the boat fully loaded. This is fine with a paid crew but might be a little on the intimidating side for a crew of amateurs. Consider a mast towering 106 feet off the deck. You will need binoculars to see the Windex. There are no runners or babystay. Powered winches are standard."

In a 2000 design review for boats.com, Bob Perry wrote of the interior, "a preliminary layout showed the paid crew occupying the forward end of the boat, but the drawings for hull No. 1 reverse that plan. This layout divides the accommodations between the paid crew aft of the main companionway and the guests forward. I'd be happy working away in the enormous galley. There is no dinette for the crew. You know what that means? Vegemite sandwiches in your lap. Forward of the companionway the owner and guests live in opulent splendor where the biggest concerns will be picking the right Burgundy for the leg of lamb and untangling the thong bikinis."

== See also ==
- List of sailing boat types
