= Schleicher ASH 25 =

Glider family by Alexander Schleicher in Germany, 1986

ASH 25
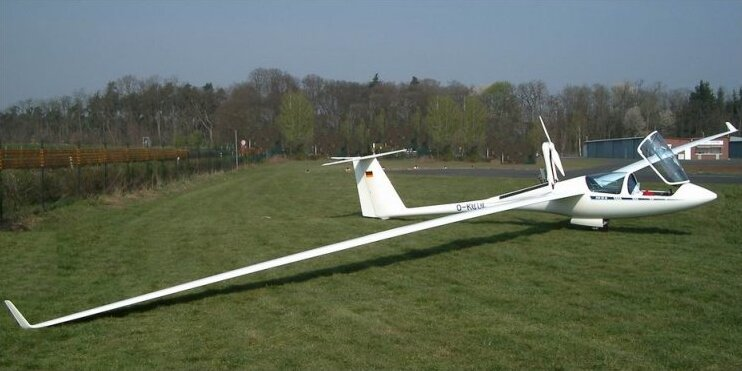

General information
- Type: Open Class sailplane
- National origin: Germany
- Manufacturer: Schleicher
- Designer: Martin Heide
- Number built: 266

History
- Manufactured: 1986–2004
- First flight: 1986
- Developed from: Schleicher ASW 22

The ASH 25 is a two-seater high performance Open Class glider manufactured by Alexander Schleicher from 1986 until September 2008, originally with a 25-metre wingspan. It was superseded in production by the ASH 30.

== Design and development ==
In 1984, designer Martin Heide (the 'H' in the type designation) combined the wing of the World Championship winning single-seater Schleicher ASW 22 with a fuselage derived from the Akaflieg Stuttgart fs31 which had particularly low drag. The prototype was designated AS 22-2. The span was increased in later versions to 25.6 or 26 metres with winglets.

A 'turbo' version was also developed, the ASH 25E, followed by the self-launching ASH 25 Mi with a large retractable propeller and a Wankel engine.

== Variants ==
ASH 25
A 25m Open class glider, 25.6m or 26m wingspan when fitted with option winglets.
ASH 25E
Self-sustaining version with a 24 hp Rotax 275 engine
ASH 25M
Self-launching version with a 50 hp AE50R engine. Both the ASH 25 and ASH 25E can be converted to the ASH 25M by the manufacturer.
ASH 25 Mi
Self-launching version with a 56 hp IAE50R-AA engine. The ASH 25, ASH 25E and ASH 25M can be converted to the ASH 25Mi by the manufacturer.
ASH 25J
Self-launching version with a jet engine
ASH 25EB
Self-launching version with a Rotax 535C engine, 27m wingspan and one-piece canopy
ASH 25EB/28
Self-launcher with one-piece canopy and 28m wingspan

== Specifications (with 25.6 metre wings) ==
Data from Specifications for ASH 25 / ASH 25 Mi

General characteristics

- Crew: 2
- Length: 8.97 m (29 ft 5 in)
- Wingspan: 25.6 m (84 ft 0 in)
- Height: 1.7 m (5 ft 7 in)
- Wing area: 16.5 m^{2} (178 sq ft)
- Aspect ratio: 39.8
- Airfoil: root:HQ 17; tip:DU 84-132/V3
- Empty weight: 478 kg (1,054 lb)
- Max takeoff weight: 750 kg (1,653 lb)
- Water ballast: 120 L (32 US gal; 26 imp gal)

Performance

- Never exceed speed: 280 km/h (170 mph, 150 kn)
- Maximum glide ratio: ca. 60:1
- Rate of sink: 0.42 m/s (83 ft/min)

== See also ==
Related lists

- List of gliders
