= Hewland AE75 =

British aircraft engine

Hewland AE75 aero-engine
- Type: Piston aero engine
- National origin: United Kingdom
- Manufacturer: Hewland

The Hewland AE75 is a lightweight aircraft engine that was manufactured in the mid-1980s by Hewland in Maidenhead, United Kingdom. The engine, a two-stroke inverted inline triple of 750 cc (46 cu in) displacement, is liquid-cooled and yields 75 hp (56 kW)

== Design and development ==
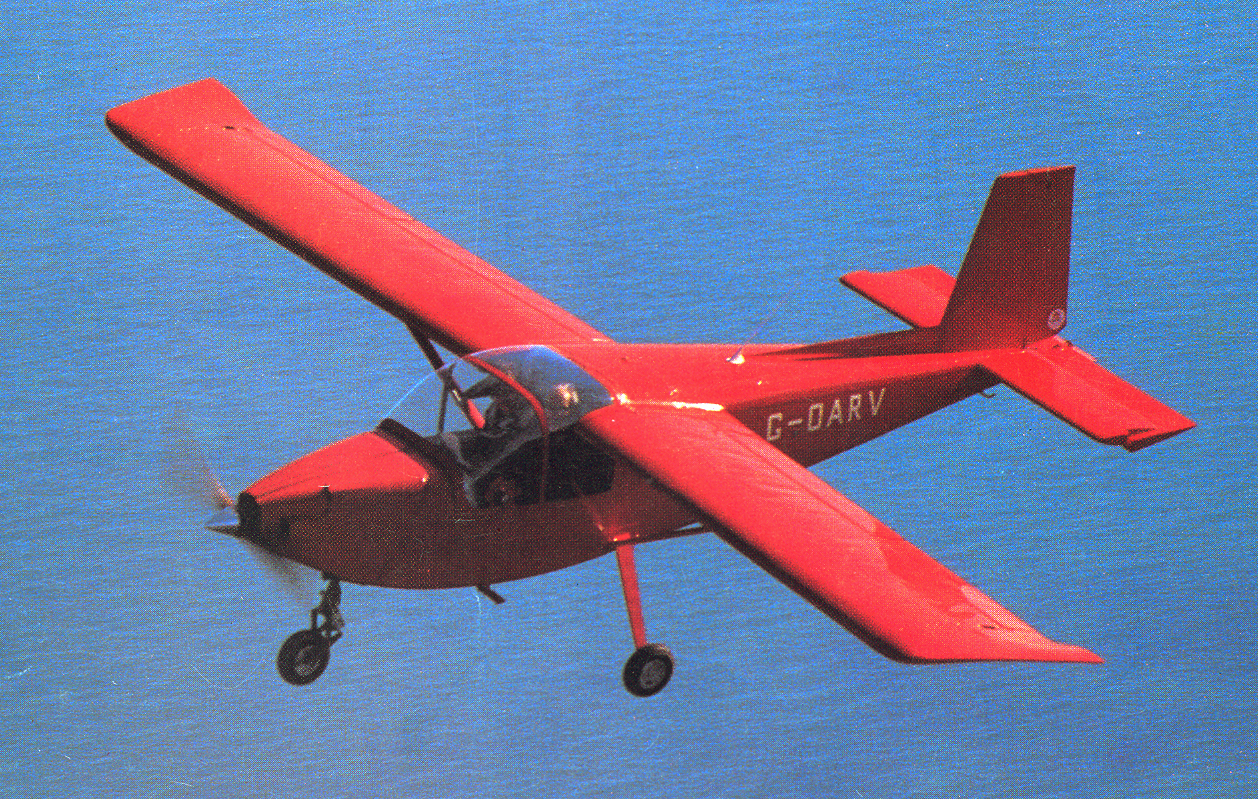
ARV Super2 with Hewland AE75 75 bhp engine

Th AE75 was developed from Hewland's own 500 cc (31 cu in) twin-cylinder microlight engine. The engine was designed specifically for the ARV Super2, a lightweight two-seater shoulder wing aircraft. The AE75's design is compact and light at 49 kg (108 lb) and yields a power-to-weight ratio of 1.14 kW/kg. Lubrication is via 40:1 pre-mix two-stroke oil.

Each of the engine's three cylinders has its own carburettor, with an alternate air device to provide carburettor heat. Each cylinder has twin spark plugs, the sparks being provided by a dual ignition system using engine-triggered amplifiers and coils, rather than the more common aviation magneto. The ignition circuit redundancy is such that if one circuit should fail, all three cylinders will still run. Even if two circuits fail, the engine will still fire on two out of three cylinders.

The engine has a 2.7:1 Propeller Speed Reduction Unit (PSRU) with helical gears in an oil bath. Final drive to the wooden 63 in (160 cm) diameter 2-blade Hoffman propeller was via a rubber “doughnut” coupling. The PSRU design sited the axis of the propeller below that of the crankshaft. This feature allowed a more pointed nose on the ARV, at the cost of slightly reduced propeller clearance.

The Hewland AE75 was never fitted to any aircraft apart from the ARV Super2, and when ARV production ceased, Hewland stopped AE75 production also. The rights to the AE75 were bought by MidWest, who were developing their AE100 twin-rotor Wankel aero-engine. MidWest had intended to restart production of the AE75 near Stroud, Gloucestershire, but this never materialised. MidWest based the AE100's gearbox on the AE75's PSRU, amending it so that the propeller axis was above the eccentric shaft's axis. This increased propeller clearance, but also raised the ARV's thrust line.

MidWest was bought by Diamond Aircraft Industries of Wiener Neustadt, Austria, but MidWest's rights to the Hewland AE75 engine were sold to a Manchester, UK private buyer. The new owner has made some modifications to the AE75, including increasing output from 75 to 90 hp (56 to 67 kW). Also being addressed is one of the AE75's identified deficiencies, the water-pump belt drive which, should the belt break when airborne, can lead to overheating and piston seizure. Resumed production of this modified Hewland engine is uncertain.

The Hewland AE75 should not be confused with the Austro Engine AE75R, a Wankel aero-engine developed from the MidWest AE50, a single-rotor version of the AE100.

== Applications ==
- ARV Super2

== Specifications ==
=== General characteristics ===
- Type: two stroke inverted inline triple,
- Displacement: 750 cc (46 cu in)
- Dry weight: 49 kg (108 lb)

=== Components ===
- Valvetrain: none (two-stroke piston ports)
- Fuel system: three carburettors, one for each cylinder, with carb heat
- Fuel type: Avgas 100/130 or Auto Gas 91 Octane Minimum
- Oil system: two-stroke pre-mix
- Cooling system: Liquid cooled

=== Performance ===
- Power output: 75 hp (56 kW) at 6750 rpm
- Fuel consumption: 14 litres/h at 75% power
- Power-to-weight ratio: 1.14 kW/kg

== See also ==
Comparable engines

- Rotax 912
- D-Motor LF26
- Jabiru 2200
- HKS 700E

Related lists

- List of aircraft engines
