= Richard Noble =

Scottish entrepreneur; holder of the land speed record from 1983 to 1997

Richard James Anthony Noble
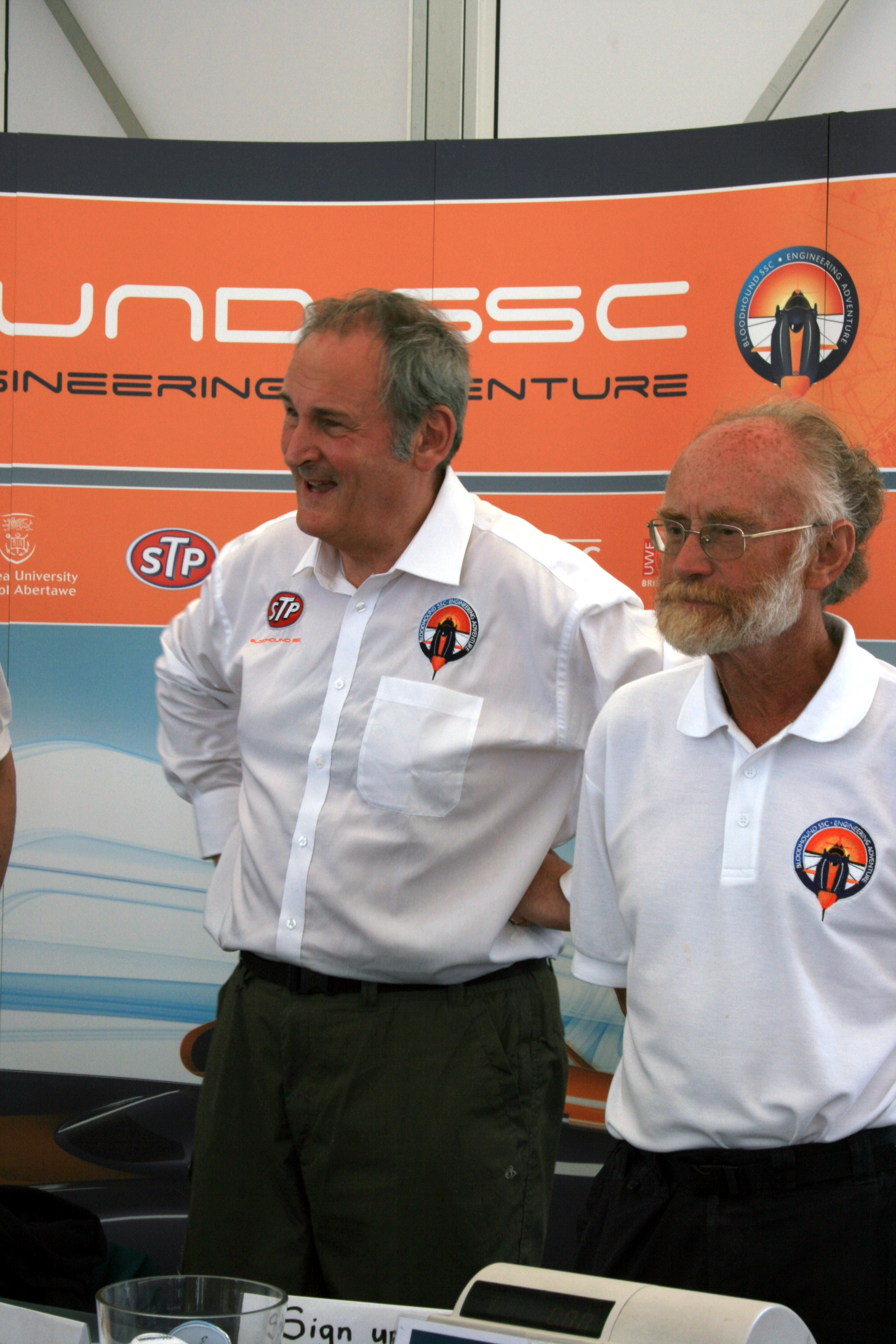
- Richard Noble (left)
- Born: 6 March 1946 (age 79); Edinburgh, Scotland
- Education: Winchester College
- Occupation: Speed record holder

Richard James Anthony Noble, OBE (born 6 March 1946) is a Scottish entrepreneur who was holder of the land speed record between 1983 and 1997. He was also the project director of ThrustSSC, the vehicle which holds the current land speed record, set at Black Rock Desert, Nevada in 1997.

== Life ==
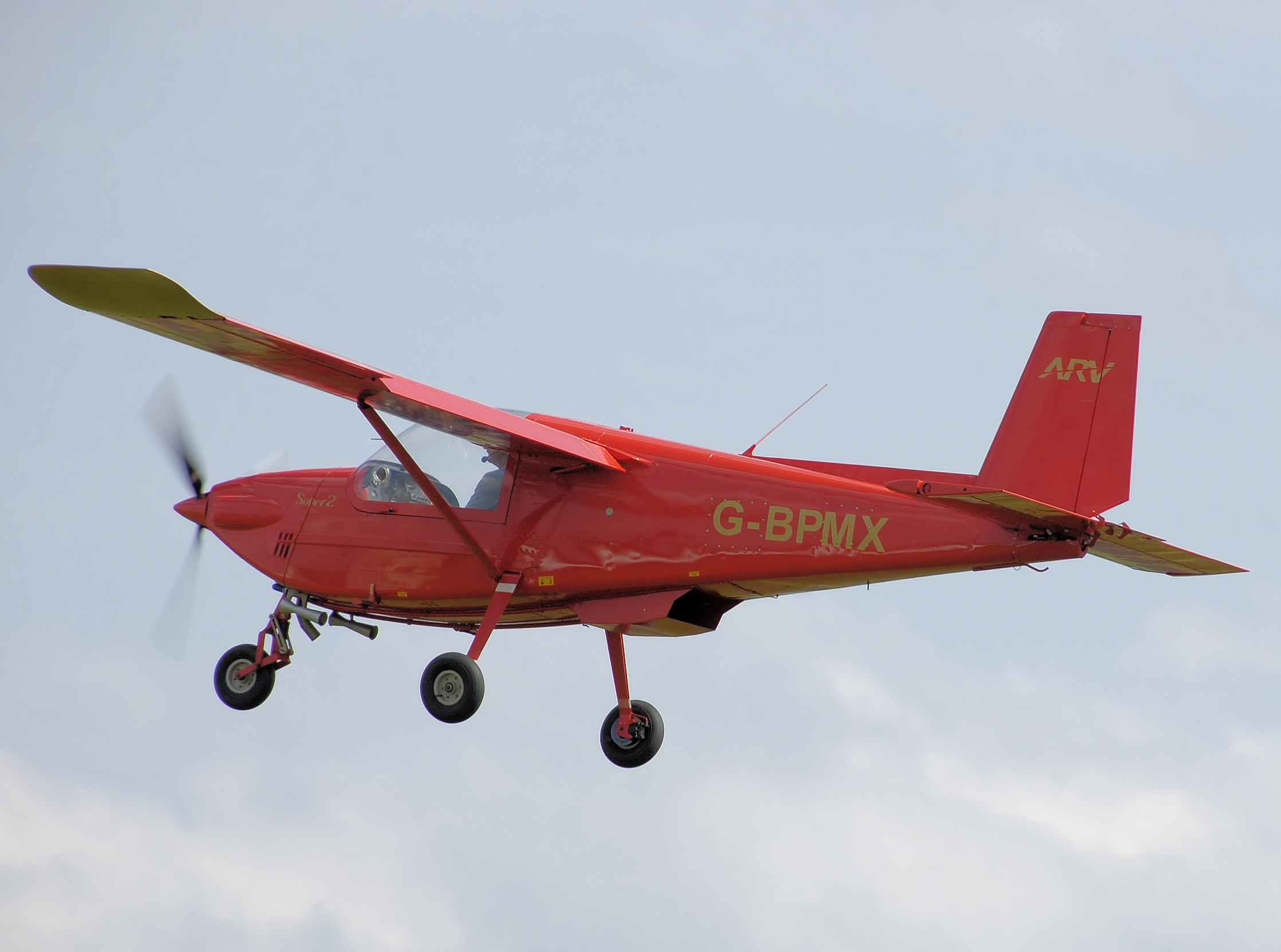
ARV Super2 with Hewland AE75 engine

Noble was born in Edinburgh, Scotland and educated at Winchester College. He became a qualified pilot.

In 1984 he exploited a production hiatus at Cessna aircraft to create the ARV Super2, a new all-British light aircraft. The Super2 was fitted with a new British engine, the Hewland AE75. Only around 40 ARVs were made before the Isle of Wight factory closed.

Thrust2, the record-breaking car driven by Noble, travelled at 633.468 mph (1019 km/h) in the Black Rock Desert in Nevada, US. The accomplishment won Noble the 1983 Segrave Trophy. ThrustSSC, the supersonic car driven by Andy Green, broke the record at 763.035 mph (1221 km/h) or Mach 1.02. Noble was planning another land speed record attempt to take place in 2019: Bloodhound SSC which aimed to surpass 1,000 mph but the project went into bankruptcy and was sold to Ian Warhurst. Noble remained a Director of Bloodhound Education Ltd. Bloodhound Education is a stand-alone charity which is funded by grants from corporate sponsors such as Saudi Aramco and others.

Noble's next project was to develop the "Farnborough F1", a six-passenger single-engined turboprop low-wing aircraft designed as an "Air Taxi" that could operate out of small airstrips. The intended market was to provide transport for businessmen who found the existing air, rail and road networks too inflexible and expensive. Noble started Farnborough Aircraft in 1998, but after failing to find backing from any major financial institution, sold shares to small investors. A bitter dispute followed, and development stopped while new investment was found. The rights to the design were transferred and the aircraft renamed Kestrel K-350. A prototype aircraft first flew in 2006 but certification and production remain uncertain.

In 2010 he was awarded an honorary Doctor of Technology by the University of the West of England.

In 2018 Noble was awarded an honorary degree from The University of Bradford.

Noble's autobiography is titled Thrust: The Remarkable Story of One Man's Quest for Speed.

== Bibliography ==
- Noble, Richard (1998). Thrust: The Remarkable Story of One Man's Quest for Speed. London: Partridge Press. ISBN 978-1852252687.
- Shapiro, Harvey (1997). Man Against the Salt. London: Minerva Press. ISBN 978-1858638980.
