= ARV Super2 =

British two-seat light aircraft

Super2
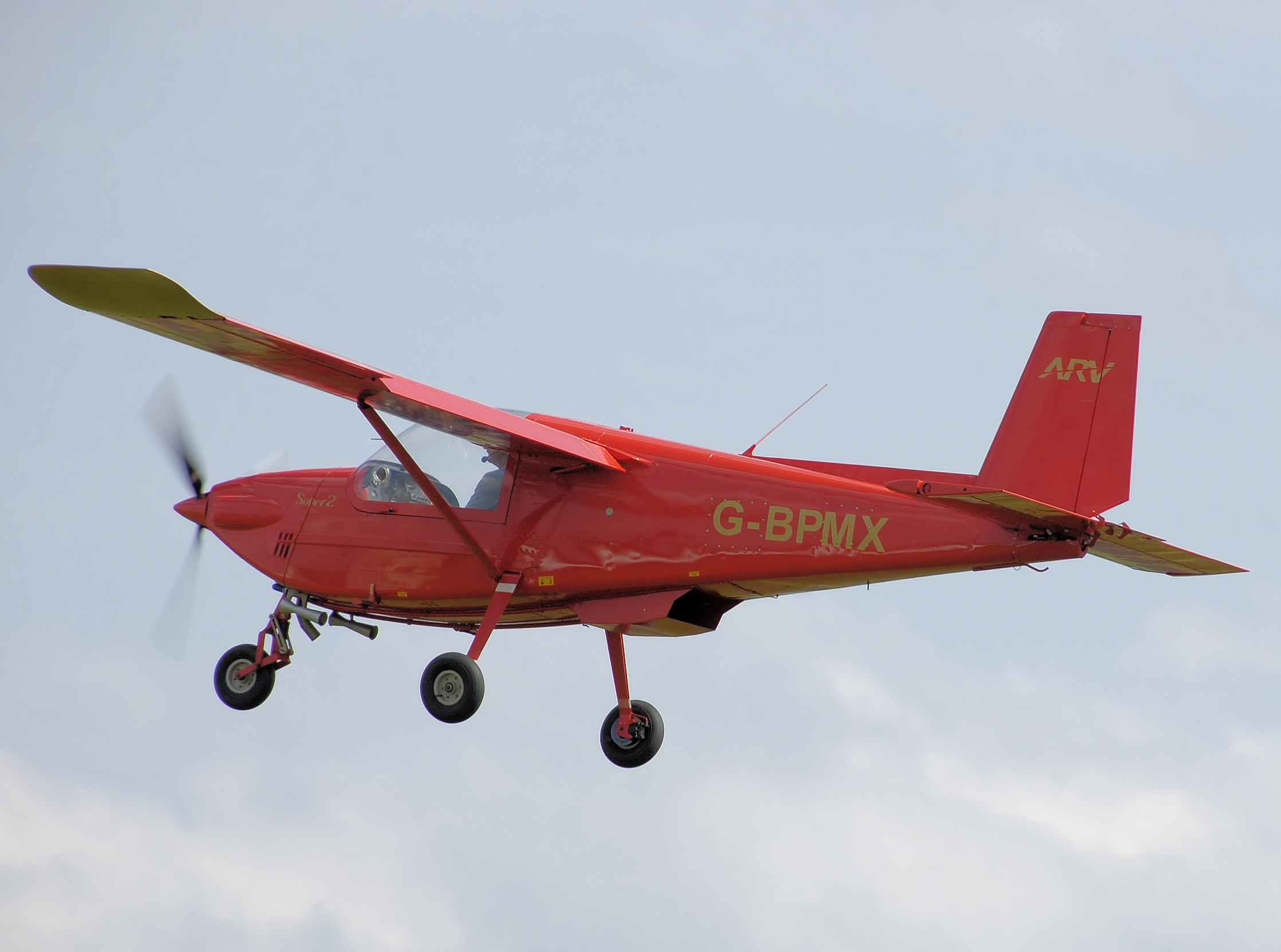

General information
- Type: Light Aircraft
- National origin: United Kingdom
- Manufacturer: ARV
- Designer: Bruce Giddings
- Status: Production discontinued
- Number built: about 40

History
- First flight: 11 March 1985

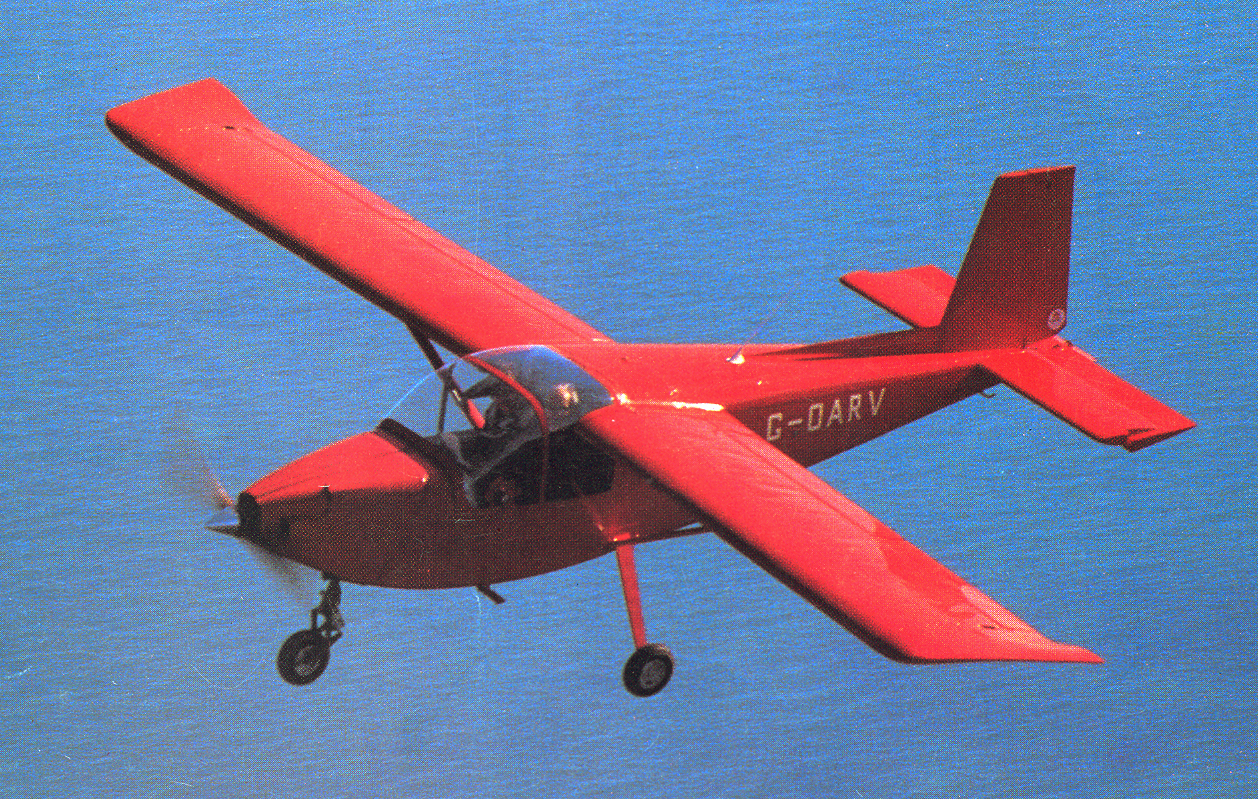
ARV prototype

ARV with MidWest AE110, Ecoprop & Trelleborg tyres

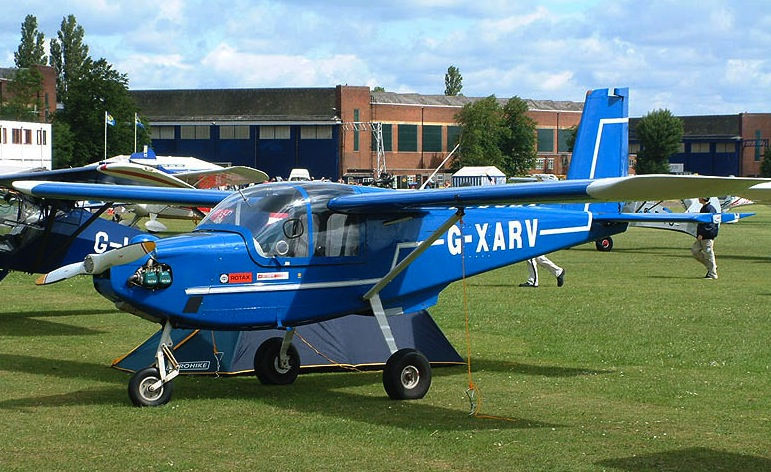
ARV with Rotax 912 & tundra tyres

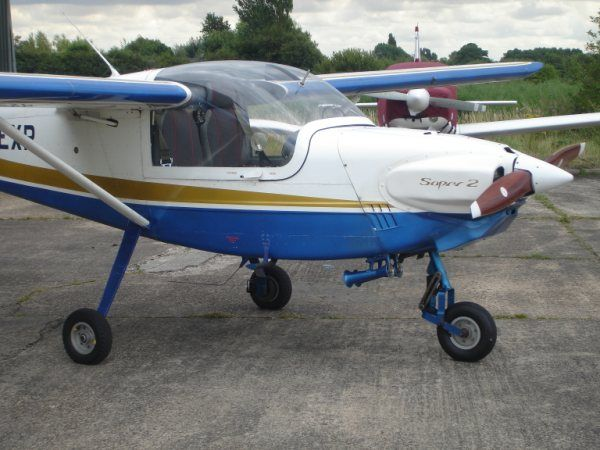
ARV with Jabiru 2200

The ARV Super2 (Air Recreational Vehicle) is a British two-seat light aircraft with strut-braced shoulder wings and tricycle landing gear. Designed by Bruce Giddings, the Super2 was available either factory-built or as a kit. It was intended to be both a cost-effective trainer and an affordable aircraft for private owners. Later called the "Opus", it gained US FAA Light-Sport Aircraft approval in February 2008.

About 35 aircraft were produced in the 1980s before the Isle of Wight-based company went into liquidation. Subsequently, there have been a number of attempts to restart production, all unsuccessful, of which the most recent was by Opus Aircraft. In November 2013, Opus Aircraft announced that its assets had been auctioned off successfully, adding: "We hope to see our plans continued and to see the all-aluminum plane flying by 2015." Since 2015, little has been heard of the ARV and no resumption of production has occurred.

== Design and development ==
Richard Noble, the world 1983 land speed record holder and UK entrepreneur, identified a gap in the market for a low-cost lightweight two-seat trainer, after expensive product-liability lawsuits in the USA had driven the major American general aviation manufacturers temporarily to abandon production of such aircraft. Noble established a factory at Sandown on the Isle of Wight to build the ARV Super2 aircraft, with the first prototype flying on 11 March 1985. The factory used some novel manufacturing techniques, including British ALCAN's "Supral" (a superplastic aluminium alloy), adhesives (to reduce the number of rivets and thereby save weight), and a bespoke new British engine, the Hewland AE75. These innovations gave the ARV an empty weight 40% lower than the Cessna 152, making the Super2 both cheaper to buy and to operate. The manufacturer claimed it could reduce pilot training costs by 25%

The ARV Super2 is a side-by-side configuration two-seater with a shoulder wing for improved visibility. The wing is swept forward 5° to maintain correct centre of gravity balance. The wing area is a small 92 sq ft (8.5 m^{2}), giving a wing loading of 11.9 lb/ft^{2} (58.1 kg/m^{2}). The forward sweep may also promote a spanwise airflow inwards towards the root, thereby reducing the likelihood of a wingtip stall. The ARV's tapered fibreglass wingtips help to reduce drag from wingtip vortices.

The ARV is constructed mainly of aluminium alloy, with fibreglass wingtips, cowlings and canopy frame. The cockpit is a stiff monocoque of "Supral" alloy for lightness and improved crash protection. Aft of the cockpit bulkhead, the ARV is conventionally built, with frames, longerons and a stressed skin forming a semi-monocoque. Skin sections are both glued and riveted. The aircraft has twin control sticks. Ailerons, elevators and flaps are pushrod-controlled, but the rudder and trim are cable-linked. Both rudder and elevator are horn-balanced. The rudder pedals also control a steerable nosewheel, but the hand-operated disc brakes are not differential and do not contribute to steering.

The AE75 engine, a 49 kg (108 lb)75 hp (56 kW) inverted three-cylinder water-cooled two-stroke unit with dual ignition and a 2.7:1 reduction gearbox, was specially developed for the ARV by Hewland from their existing two-cylinder microlight engine. The AE75 engine has a TBO of only 800 hours, and, in the absence of continuing factory support, many ARVs have had their AE75s replaced with engines such as the Rotax 912, the Rotax 914, or the Jabiru 2200. Three ARVs were fitted with a MidWest twin-rotor wankel as their original engine.

The Super2 gained airworthiness certification in July 1986, and soon after entered production. In November 1985, Noble had reached an agreement to supply ARV parts to Canada's Instar Aviation, where the aircraft was intended to be assembled for the North American market. Transport Canada had agreed to certify the aircraft based on it "meeting UK criteria", but in the end these Canadian production plans came to nothing.

Originally, ARVs were available either as kit-built aircraft (subject to PFA Permit), or factory built (and subject to the CAA Certificate of Airworthiness). In the spring of 1990 Aviation Scotland Limited was to restart production and in 1993 that company intended to set up another facility in Sweden to build ARVs. In the late 1990s the aircraft was sold in kit form in the US as the Highlander by Highlander Aircraft Corporation of Golden Valley, Minnesota.

In 2004, the CAA reclassified all ARVs as PFA (now LAA) Permit aircraft. The ARV Super2 was originally intended to be aerobatic, but the Isle of Wight factory closed before CAA clearance was obtained, so aerobatics remain prohibited. The factory had also planned to develop a four-seater version, wing-tip tanks and floats.

Opus Aircraft upgraded some specifications for the aircraft, increasing the Vne to 134 kn (248 km/h) and increasing the gross weight to 1,168 lb (530 kg). The company intended to equip the aircraft with the Rotax 912UL or 912A of 80 hp (60 kW).

=== Production history ===
The ARV Super2 has had an interrupted production history, with a number of successive companies producing 40 aircraft in total.

Shortly after initial aircraft deliveries began, there were a number of forced landings. These were due to gearbox failures induced by propeller vibration, and in November 1987 the CAA grounded the aircraft. Although these problems were quickly resolved, the aircraft's reputation suffered. Buyers and investors lost confidence, leading to the closure of the Isle of Wight factory and the company was forced into administration. This resulted in a management buyout and the company being renamed Island Aircraft. Some 30 or so aircraft were completed by ARV and then by Island Aircraft at Sandown. Production was then transferred first to Scotland and then to Sweden, where the ARV was renamed the "Opus 280", However, no aircraft were produced in Sweden before the proprietors went bankrupt in 1995. After yet another unsuccessful attempt to restart production in Ohio, USA, all manufacturing rights (plus a selection of aircraft parts) were sold to a new consortium, "Opus Aircraft". Opus Aircraft established a factory at Rockingham, near Stoneville, North Carolina, and in February 2008, the "Opus Super 2" was granted FAA Light Sport Aircraft approval. The factory produced an "Opus Super 2" prototype, but the proposed resumption of production never occurred. The company, valued at US$8 million, was offered for sale for US$2.9 million, and in October 2013 the company was purchased at auction.

== Operational history ==
The ARV Super2 has received favourable reviews which describe it as an aircraft with excellent visibility that is pleasant to fly. The small wing area and the fairly high wing loading produces handling that is responsive but stable. A drawback for touring is the shortage of luggage space. The second prototype, G-STWO, has a fuselage luggage compartment aft of the fuel tank which is accessed from the starboard aside, but no other ARVs have this feature. After initial production commenced at least two flying schools adopted the ARV, but today most Super2s in the UK are flown privately.

The Hewland AE75 engine, which is no longer available, has a life of 800 hours, after which time alternative engines must be installed. Replacement engines have all been heavier than the 49 kg (108 lb) original, needing a lead counterweight in the tail to maintain balance. The empenage is short-coupled and its area is a little marginal for the landing flare, so flaring with a stopped engine (and thus no propwash) might prove problematic.

LAA-approved modifications include ground-adjustable propellers, tundra tyres, additional fuel tanks and fuel-injection. The LAA has approved the fitting and testing of vortex generators, with a view to reducing stall speed and improving landing flare.

=== Canopy safety issues ===
The perspex canopy, which gives sailplane-like visibility, is hinged at the rear. To open the canopy, one rotates it up and back. The canopy is secured at the front by two over-centre catches operated from outside and within the cockpit. Even in the early days of the ARV, this was considered a design weakness, since if a catch fails or is not properly engaged, the canopy could flip up and cause massive drag. Such an incident actually happened in 2025 when the canopy flipped open shortly after take-off. The ARV crash-landed in a field; the pilot was OK but the aircraft was a write-off. Some ARV owners have, (with LAA approval), converted their canopies to have a hinge at the forward end and catches at the rear, so that if the catches fail, the canopy will not flip wide open.

== Specifications (ARV Super 2) ==
Data from Jane's All the World's Aircraft 1988–89

General characteristics

- Crew: 2
- Length: 5.49 m (18 ft 0 in)
- Wingspan: 8.69 m (28 ft 6 in)
- Width: 2.54 m (8 ft 4 in) (wings removed, but tailplane still attached)
- Height: 2.31 m (7 ft 7 in)
- Wing area: 8.59 m^{2} (92.5 sq ft)
- Aspect ratio: 8.8:1
- Airfoil: NACA 2415 (modified)
- Empty weight: 306 kg (675 lb)
- Gross weight: 499 kg (1,100 lb)
- Fuel capacity: 55 L (12 imp gal; 15 US gal)
- Powerplant: 1 × Hewland AE75 3-cylinder liquid-cooled inline engine, 57 kW (77 hp)
- Propellers: 2-bladed Hoffman fixed-pitch propeller, 1.60 m (5 ft 3 in) diameter

Performance

- Maximum speed: 190 km/h (120 mph, 100 kn) at 610 m (2,000 ft)
- Cruise speed: 153 km/h (95 mph, 83 kn) at 610 m (2,000 ft)
- Stall speed: 88 km/h (55 mph, 48 kn) (flaps down)
- Never exceed speed: 232 km/h (144 mph, 125 kn)
- Range: 500 km (310 mi, 270 nmi) (with maximum fuel)
- Rate of climb: 3.1 m/s (620 ft/min)
- Takeoff run to 15 m (50 ft): 712 m (2,336 ft)
- Landing run from 15 m (50 ft): 470 m (1,540 ft)

== See also ==
Aircraft of comparable role, configuration, and era

- Bölkow Junior
- Saab Safari
