= Steyr Motors GmbH =

Austrian diesel engine manufacturer

Steyr Motors Betriebs AG
- Type: Public limited company
- ISIN: AT0000A3FW25
- Founded: 2001
- Headquarters: Steyr, Austria
- Products: Diesel engines
- Revenue: 45 million Euro (2018)
- Number of employees: 225 (2018)
- Website: Official website

Steyr Motors (German pronunciation: [ˈʃtaɪɐ]) is an Austrian manufacturer of diesel engines based in Steyr, Upper-Austria.

== History ==
Steyr Motors originated in the diesel engine division of the earlier Steyr-Daimler-Puch group. In 2001, it became an independent company through an internal management buyout.

In 2008, Steyr Motors presented the world's first parallel hybrid propulsion system for boats, STEYR HDS. In the same year, the company achieved numerous awards for this innovation (DAME Award at METS exhibition in Amsterdam and the National Marine Manufacturers Association's IBEX Award). In cooperation with the Dutch company Mastervolt, Steyr Motors manufactures hybrid propulsion systems for pleasure boats.

In 2009, Steyr Motors signed a license agreement with AM General to present the engine during the AUSA exhibition as "OPTIMIZER 3200", for the production of its diesel engines.

Since 2011, Steyr Motors has developed compact aircraft engines based its monoblock engine, in cooperation with the Austrian company Austro Engine.

== Products ==
The principal products are the STEYR M1-"Monoblock" engine family which is the result of a long development process that was started by Steyr-Daimler-Puch in the 1920s. The STEYR M1 engine is a turbocharged diesel engine with high pressure unit injectors with two stage injection nozzles, providing up to 2,000 bar injection pressure. It is a compact and light engine designed to be operated with Diesel, kerosene or Maritime Diesel fuel.

Adapted versions of these engines are used in various boats and military vehicles. Automotive and military applications are, for instance, AM General's HMMWV (M16, 135 kW), Panhard's VBL (M14, 95 kW), Hägglund's Bandvagn 206S (M16, 145 kW), UROVESA's URO VAMTAC (M16, 135 kW or M14, 85 kW), BAE Systems' RG-32M LTV (M16, 200 kW), Force Protection's Ocelot (M16, 160 kW).

=== STEYR M14 ===
2.1L Turbodiesel, straight engine, 4-cylinder

=== STEYR M16 ===
3.2L Turbodiesel, straight engine, 6-cylinder

=== STEYR HDS ===
STEYR Hybrid Drive System is a diesel-electric parallel hybrid system. It allows a clean and quiet propulsion within a harbor because the boat can be driven purely by its electric motor. The electric motor can also be used in a 'boost'-mode to support the diesel engine in order to achieve better acceleration.
