= Schleicher ASH 31 =

Single-seat German motor glider, 2009

ASH 31
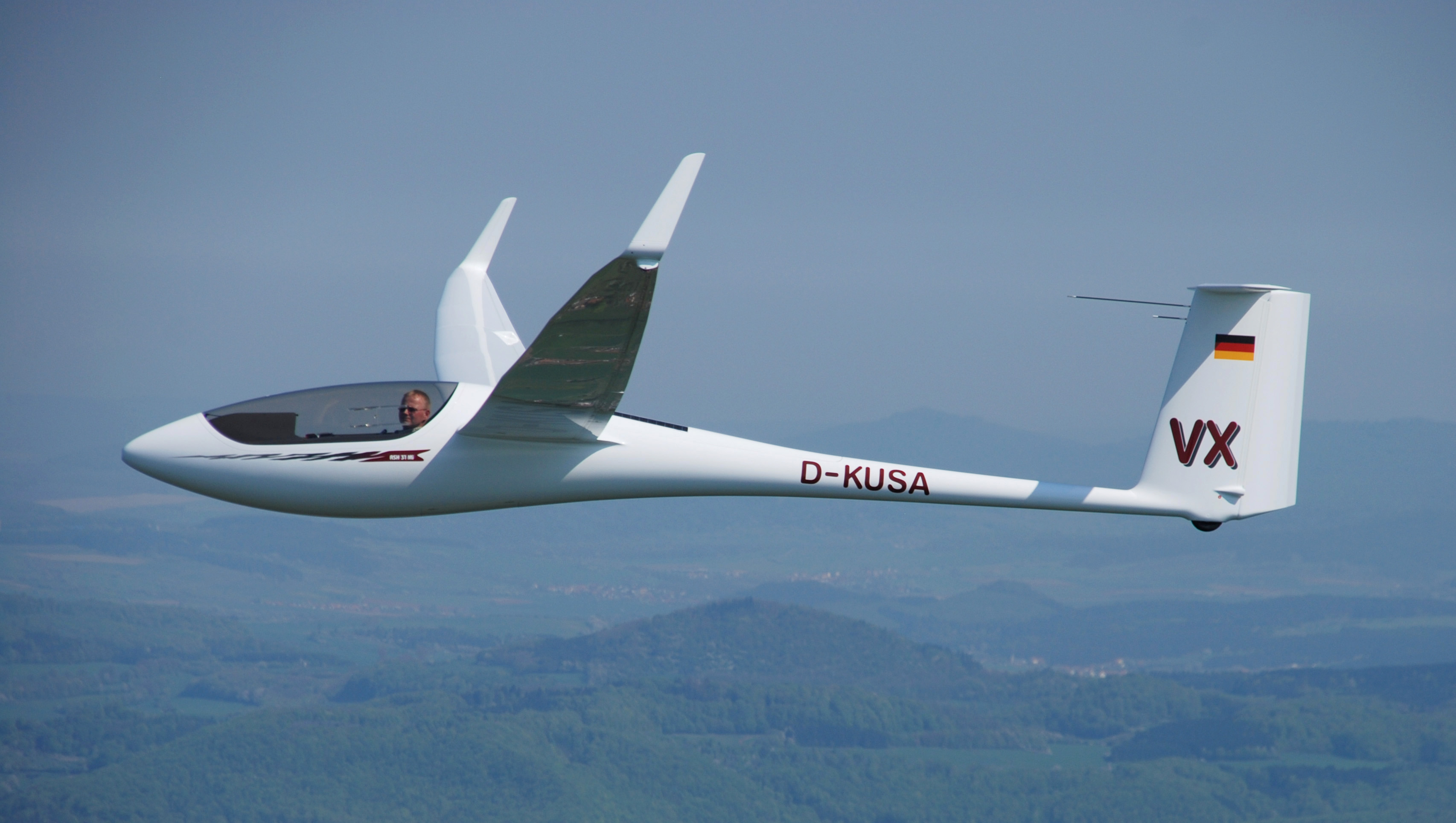
- Schleicher ASH 31 Mi during its first flight

General information
- Type: Open-class sailplane
- National origin: Germany
- Manufacturer: Schleicher
- Designer: Martin Heide
- Number built: 100 as of 2013

History
- First flight: 21 April 2009

The ASH 31 is a single seat Open Class glider which can also be flown in the 18 metre class configuration.

== Design and development ==
The ASH 31 was announced at the end of 2008 by Alexander Schleicher. The glider was developed as a replacement for the ASH 26. The self-launching Mi version is powered by a 41 kW (55 hp) Wankel engine.

The improvements over the ASH 26 and ASG 29 are given as:

- Extended ailerons
- Redesigned wing structure

== Variants ==
ASH 31
Production aircraft with a wingspan of either 18-metres or 21-metres.
ASH 31 Mi
Production aircraft with a retractable engine and propeller for self-launching. It can be flown with a wingspan of either 18-metres or 21-metres.

== Specifications (21-metre) ==
Data from Schleicher.

General characteristics

- Crew: One
- Capacity:
  - 115 kg (254 lb) max. pilot weight
  - 140 kg (310 lb) max. water ballast in the wing
- Length: 7.07 m (23 ft 2 in)
- Wingspan: 21 m (68 ft 11 in) including winglets
- Wing area: 13.2 m^{2} (142 sq ft)
- Aspect ratio: 33.5
- Empty weight: 430 kg (948 lb)
- Max takeoff weight: 700 kg (1,543 lb)
- Fuel capacity:
  - 16 L (3.5 imp gal; 4.2 US gal) in fuselage fuel tank
  - 46 L (10 imp gal; 12 US gal) with 2 wing fuel tanks
- Powerplant: 1 × Austro Engine IAE 50R-AA single rotor Wankel engine, 41 kW (55 hp)
- Propellers: 2-bladed, 1.55 m (5 ft 1 in) diameter (retractable)

Performance

- Rate of climb: 4 m/s (790 ft/min)
- Lift-to-drag: 56
- Wing loading: 53.0 kg/m^{2} (10.8 lb/sq ft) max

== See also ==
Aircraft of comparable role, configuration, and era

- Jonker JS-1 Revelation (21m version)
- Lange Antares 23E
- Schempp-Hirth Quintus

Related lists

- List of gliders
