= Austro Engine AE75R =

AE75R
- Type: Aircraft engine
- National origin: Austria
- Manufacturer: Austro Engine

The Austro Engine AE75R is an Austrian aircraft engine, that was designed and produced by Austro Engine of Wiener Neustadt for use in ultralight aircraft.

As of March 2018 the engine was no longer advertised for sale on the company website.

== Design and development ==
The AE75R is a twin-rotor four-stroke, 588 cc (35.9 cu in) displacement, air and liquid-cooled, gasoline Wankel engine design, with a helical gear mechanical gearbox reduction drive with reduction ratio of 2.96:1. It employs dual capacitor discharge ignition and produces 75 hp (56 kW) at 7000 rpm, with a compression ratio of 9.5:1.

== Specifications (IAE75R) ==
Data from Tacke

=== General characteristics ===
- Type: Twin rotor Wankel aircraft engine
- Displacement: 588 cc (35.9 cu in)
- Length: 720 mm (28.3 in)
- Width: 530 mm (20.9 in)
- Height: 420 mm (16.5 in)
- Dry weight: 33 kg (72.8 lb)

=== Components ===
- Fuel type: gasoline
- Cooling system: liquid or air
- Reduction gear: helical gear mechanical gearbox, reduction ratio of 2.96:1

=== Performance ===
- Power output: 75 hp (56 kW)
- Compression ratio: 9.5:1

== See also ==
Related lists

- List of aircraft engines
