= RG Outrider =

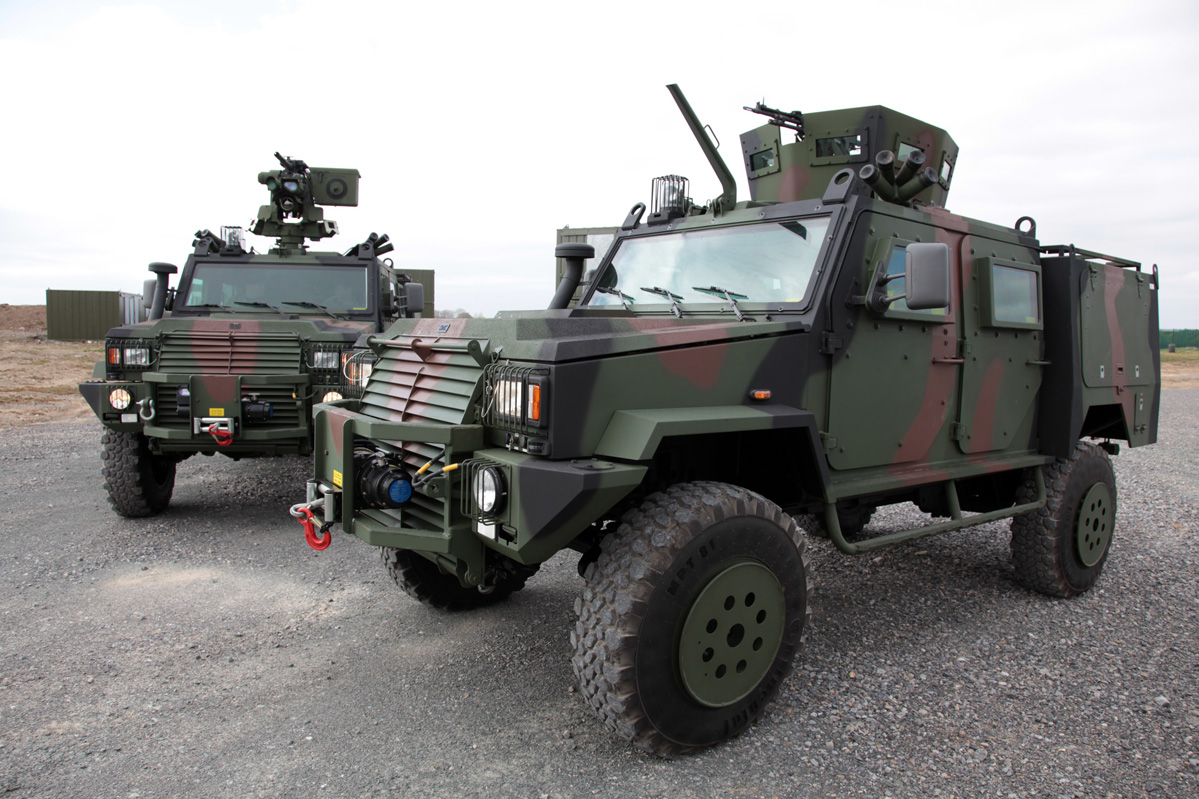
- Irish Army light tactical armoured vehicles (LTAV)
- Type: Armoured personnel carrier MRAP (armored vehicle)
- Place of origin: South Africa

Service history
- Used by: Ireland (no longer in operational service)

Production history
- Designer: BAE Systems

Specifications
- Mass: 9,500 kilograms (20,900 lb)
- Length: 6 metres (20 ft)
- Width: 2.205 metres (7 ft 2.8 in)
- Height: 2.190 metres (7 ft 2.2 in)
- Crew: 2+2
- Main armament: weapons mount
- Engine: Steyr M16 SCI Turbo charged intercooled 200 kilowatts (270 hp) @ 4,000 rpm
- Transmission: Allison S1000 5-speed automatic
- Suspension: Rigid portal axles with coil springs and telescopic shock absorbers on front and rear
- Maximum speed: >120 kilometres per hour (75 mph)

The RG Outrider, also known by its original designation RG-32M light tactical vehicle (LTV), is a 4x4 multi-purpose mine-protected armoured personnel carrier (APC) manufactured by BAE Systems of South Africa. It was first introduced in early 2009 as the RG-32M LTV, and was first purchased by Ireland. The vehicle was offered to the US market the following year, re-designated as RG Outrider. It is based on, and is the successor to, the RG-32M, which was in service in Afghanistan with the coalition forces. The RG Outrider offers several improvements over its predecessor, including the addition of the V-shaped hull.

== History ==
In February 2009, BAE Systems announced the introduction of a new variant of the RG-32M, named RG-32M LTV, which was put on display at the International Defence Exhibition (IDEX) the same month. The main improvement was the addition of a V-shaped hull, increasing the protection offered. BAE Systems claimed that "the RG32M is mine hardened, but the RG32M LTV is mine protected". Ireland was the first country to purchase the RG-32M LTV, acquiring 27 units for assisting peacekeeping operations. The vehicle was launched for the North American market in early 2010, with the new designation RG Outrider. The company announced in February 2010 that they had demonstrated the RG Outrider to US military commanders at the Nevada Automotive Test Center. It was exhibited at the Association of the United States Army (AUSA) winter exposition the same month. It was marketed in the United States targeting operations in Afghanistan where its predecessor, the RG-32M, has been in use with US, Swedish and Spanish forces.

In Irish service, the RG Outrider (known as the Light Tactical Armoured Vehicle, or LTAV) developed a reputation for poor reliability and complex maintenance requirements. Many of the vehicles saw limited usage before the Irish Defence Forces withdrew the vehicles from service in 2024, and placed the entire fleet into storage in 2026. The vehicles were later scrapped after Ukraine rejected an offer from the Irish government to supply the vehicles to the Ukrainian military.

== Features ==
The RG Outrider is slightly larger than its predecessor, with the hull being 200 millimetres (7.9 in) wider and 50 millimetres (2.0 in) higher. In addition to the APC role, it can also be used as a command, liaison or scouting vehicle. The RG Outrider can provide ballistic protection against up to 7.62×39mm anti-personnel rounds (STANAG 4569 level 2). Anti-tank mine protection is of level 2a and 2b (under wheel and under center), and it can also provide side protection against Improvised Explosive Devices (IED). A 7.62 mm or 12.7 mm machine gun can be fitted to the weapon station on the roof.

The RG Outrider has a height of 2,190 millimetres (86 in), and is 6,000 millimetres (240 in) long and 2,205 millimetres (86.8 in) wide. It has a wheelbase of 3,340 millimetres (131 in) and a ground clearance of 430 millimetres (17 in). Classified as a four-wheeled mine protected patrol vehicle, it has a weight of 9,500 kilograms (20,900 lb), and can carry 4 personnel including the driver and commander. It is powered by a Steyr M16S CI Turbo charged intercooled engine (6-cylinder, 200 kW), with 5-speed automatic transmission and four-wheel drive capability. It has a maximum speed in excess of 120 kilometres per hour (75 mph), and can negotiate up to 60% gradients and 30% side-slopes. The RG Outrider also has a payload capability of 2,000 kilograms (4,400 lb). Its load bay allows the addition of mission specific equipment, thus allowing the vehicle to be adapted to different conditions. Commercial off-the-shelf parts have been used extensively in the vehicle, with the view that this will reduce the need for crew training and logistics problems.

== See also ==
- Infantry fighting vehicle
