= Austro Engine AE50R =

Aircraft engine

AE50R
- Type: Aircraft engine
- National origin: Austria
- Manufacturer: Austro Engine
- Major applications: Schiebel Camcopter S-100; Schleicher ASH 30; Schleicher ASH 31
- Number built: over 700

The Austro Engine AE50R is an Austrian aircraft engine, produced by Austro Engine of Wiener Neustadt for use in motorgliders and UAVs.

== Design and development ==
The AE50R is based on the MidWest AE50. Diamond Aircraft Industries purchased the design from Mid-West Engines Limited on 10 March 2003 and took over as the type certificate holder. Diamond formed its subsidiary, Austro Engine, to produce the engine.

The engine is a single rotor four-stroke, air and liquid-cooled, 294 cc (17.9 cu in) gasoline Wankel engine design, with a mechanical gearbox reduction drive employing a helical gear set with a reduction ratio of 3.225:1. Cooling is predominantly liquid, with forced air cooling for the rotor core. A starter and generator are standard equipment. It employs dual capacitor discharge ignition with variable ignition timing and produces 55 hp (41 kW) at 7750 rpm.

The engine was originally type certified by Mid-West on 18 Dec 1992 to JAR-22 H, Change 4, dated 13 September 1982, incl. Orange Paper 22/90/1. It was transferred to an EASA Type Certificate under EASA Part 22 Subpart H on 4 April 2011.

== Variants ==
AE50R
Base version, equipped with a conventional dual ignition system and a carburettor, certified 18 December 1992
AE50RA
Version equipped with a conventional dual ignition system and a carburettor, with differing engine attachment point geometry, certified 26 September 2001
AE50RAB
Version equipped with a conventional dual ignition system and a carburettor, with differing engine attachment point geometry, certified 26 September 2001
IAE50R-AA
Version equipped with electronic dual ignition system and fuel injection system, with differing engine attachment point geometry, with a narrower width of 339 mm (13.3 in), certified 26 September 2001

== Applications ==
- Schiebel Camcopter S-100
- Schleicher ASG 32
- Schleicher ASH 30
- Schleicher ASH 31

== Specifications (AE50R) ==
Data from World Directory of Leisure Aviation 2011-12

=== General characteristics ===
- Type: Single rotor, four-stroke Wankel aircraft engine
- Displacement: 294 cc (17.9 cu in)
- Length: 585 mm (23.0 in)
- Width: 310 mm (12.2 in)
- Height: 300 mm (11.8 in)
- Dry weight: 27.8 kg (61.3 lb)

=== Components ===
- Fuel type: Avgas 100LL or RON 95 Unleaded
- Cooling system: liquid (50% glycol, water) and forced air cooling for rotor core
- Reduction gear: mechanical gearbox helical gear reduction drive, a reduction ratio of 3.225:1

=== Performance ===
- Power output: 55 hp (41 kW) at 7750 rpm
- Compression ratio: 9:1
- Power-to-weight ratio: 0.9 hp/lb (1.48 kW/kg)

== See also ==
Related lists

- List of aircraft engines
