= Schleicher ASH 30 =

Glider / motor glider by Alexander Schleicher in Germany, 2011

ASH 30
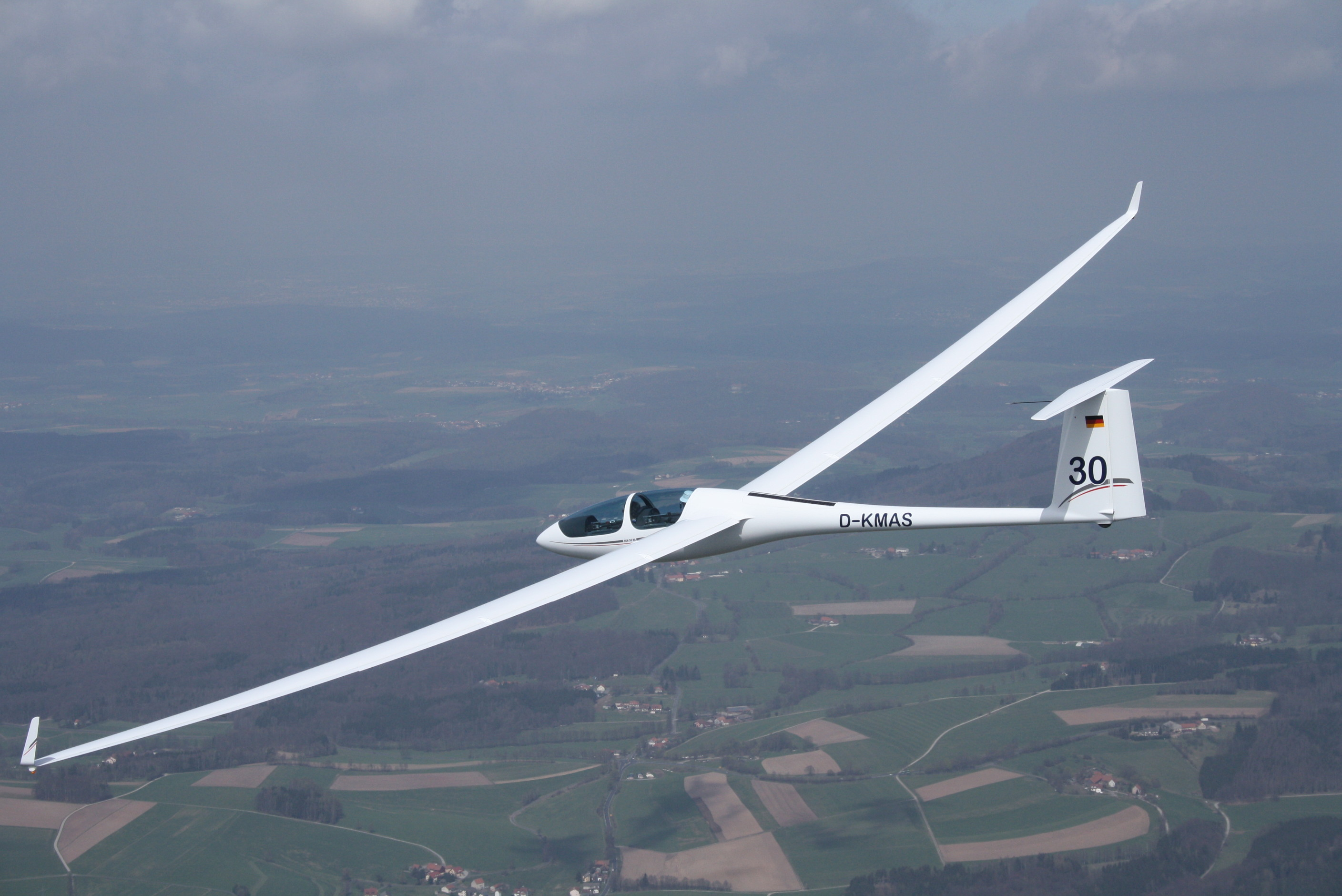
- Martin Heide and Peter Kremer flying the maiden flight.

General information
- Type: Open Class sailplane
- National origin: Germany
- Manufacturer: Schleicher
- Designer: Martin Heide
- Number built: 5 as of 2013

History
- First flight: 7 April 2011

The ASH 30 is a two-seater Open Class glider manufactured by Alexander Schleicher, developed as a replacement for the ASH 25. The Mi version is powered by a 41 kW (55 hp) Wankel engine. The prototype made its maiden flight on 7 April 2011 from Wasserkuppe.

== Design and development ==
The improvements over the ASH 25 are given as:

- a larger span
- new wing sections with a coefficient of lift that is about 0.2 higher
- a maximum take-off weight of 850 kg for the Mi version
- automatic control surface connections for the entire aircraft
- enlarged cockpits
- larger canopies to improve visibility and to allow easier entry and exit for the rear pilot

== Variants ==
ASH 30
The un-powered prototype glider.
ASH 30 Mi
The motor-glider production aircraft, capable of self launching with a retractable engine and propeller.

== Specifications (ASH 30 Mi) ==
Data from Schleicher.

General characteristics

- Crew: Two
- Capacity:
  - 50 L (110 lb) max. water ballast in wing
- Length: 9.33 m (30 ft 7 in)
- Wingspan: 26.5 m (86 ft 11 in) including winglets
- Height: 1.79 m (5 ft 10 in)
- Wing area: 17.17 m^{2} (184.8 sq ft)
- Aspect ratio: 40.9
- Empty weight: 630 kg (1,389 lb)
- Max takeoff weight: 850 kg (1,874 lb)
- Fuel capacity:
  - 14 L in fuselage fuel tank
  - 44 L with 2 wing fuel tanks
- Powerplant: 1 × Austro Engine IAE 50R-AA single rotor Wankel engine, 41 kW (55 hp)
- Propellers: 2-bladed, 1.55 m (5 ft 1 in) diameter (retractable)

Performance

- Maximum glide ratio: >60
- Rate of climb: 3 m/s (590 ft/min)
- Wing loading: 49.5 kg/m^{2} (10.1 lb/sq ft)

== See also ==
Related lists

- List of gliders
