= Austro Engine =

Austrian manufacturer of aircraft engines

Austro Engine GmbH
- Company type: Company with limited liability
- Industry: Aerospace
- Founded: 2007
- Headquarters: Wiener Neustadt, Austria
- Key people: Roland Thomas Müller
- Operating income: EUR 500.000 (2008)
- Number of employees: 70 (2008)
- Website: www.austroengine.at

Austro Engine is an Austrian manufacturer of aircraft engines based at Wiener Neustadt in Lower Austria.

== History ==
The production site and headquarters was built in 2007 with an investment of EUR 13 Million. The company was founded by Diamond Aircraft Industries and partners. The products are reciprocating engines and Wankel engines. The Wankel aero-engines are developed from the MidWest AE series engines developed at Staverton by MidWest, a UK firm that was bought by Diamond.

== Products ==
=== Austro Engine E4 (AE 300) ===
Reciprocating four-cylinder, four-stroke diesel aircraft engine, marketed as the AE 300, it produces 170 hp (127 kW). Certified through the European Aviation Safety Agency EASA on January 28, 2009 and through the FAA on July 29, 2009. The E4 is installed on various types of Diamond Aircraft Industries aircraft.

=== Austro Engine AE 330 ===
Derived from the AE300, the AE 330 produces an increased 180hp (132kW) of power. Two AE330s are used to power the Diamond DA62.

=== AE50R ===
Single rotor Wankel engine with 294 cm^{3} (18 cu in) displacement, 55 hp (41 kW) and a weight of 28 kg (62 lb). The AE50R is installed on the Schleicher ASH 30, Schleicher ASH 31 and Schiebel Camcopter S-100.

=== AE75R ===
Further development of the AE50R. No certification. Twin rotor, 588 cc (36 cu in), (max) 75 hp (56 kW) at 7000 rpm, 33 kg (73 lb).

=== AE80R ===
Another development of the AE50R with a power output of 80 hp (60 kW), announced in January 2013.

=== AE200 ===
3-cylinder inline, 120 hp (89 kW). Intended to power a diesel variant of the Diamond DA20.

=== AE500 ===
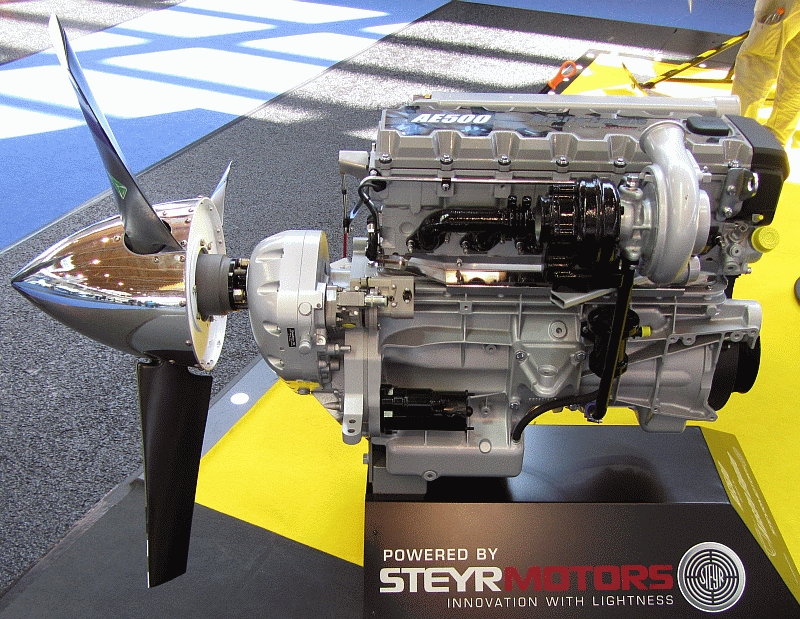
The AE500 on display

Based on Steyr Motors' M1 3.2 liter "Monoblock", the AE500 (6-cylinder, 280 hp (209 kW)) is the result of the cooperation between the two companies. It was intended for use in the Diamond DA50 but was instead replaced with the Continental CD-300.

=== Austro Engine GIAE110R ===
Twin rotor Wankel engine with 588 cm^{3} (36 cu in) displacement, 105 hp (78 kW) and a weight of 54 kg (119 lb). Does not seem to have been placed in production.

== See also ==
Related lists

- List of aircraft engine manufacturers
