= Norton RCW588 =

Racing motorcycle

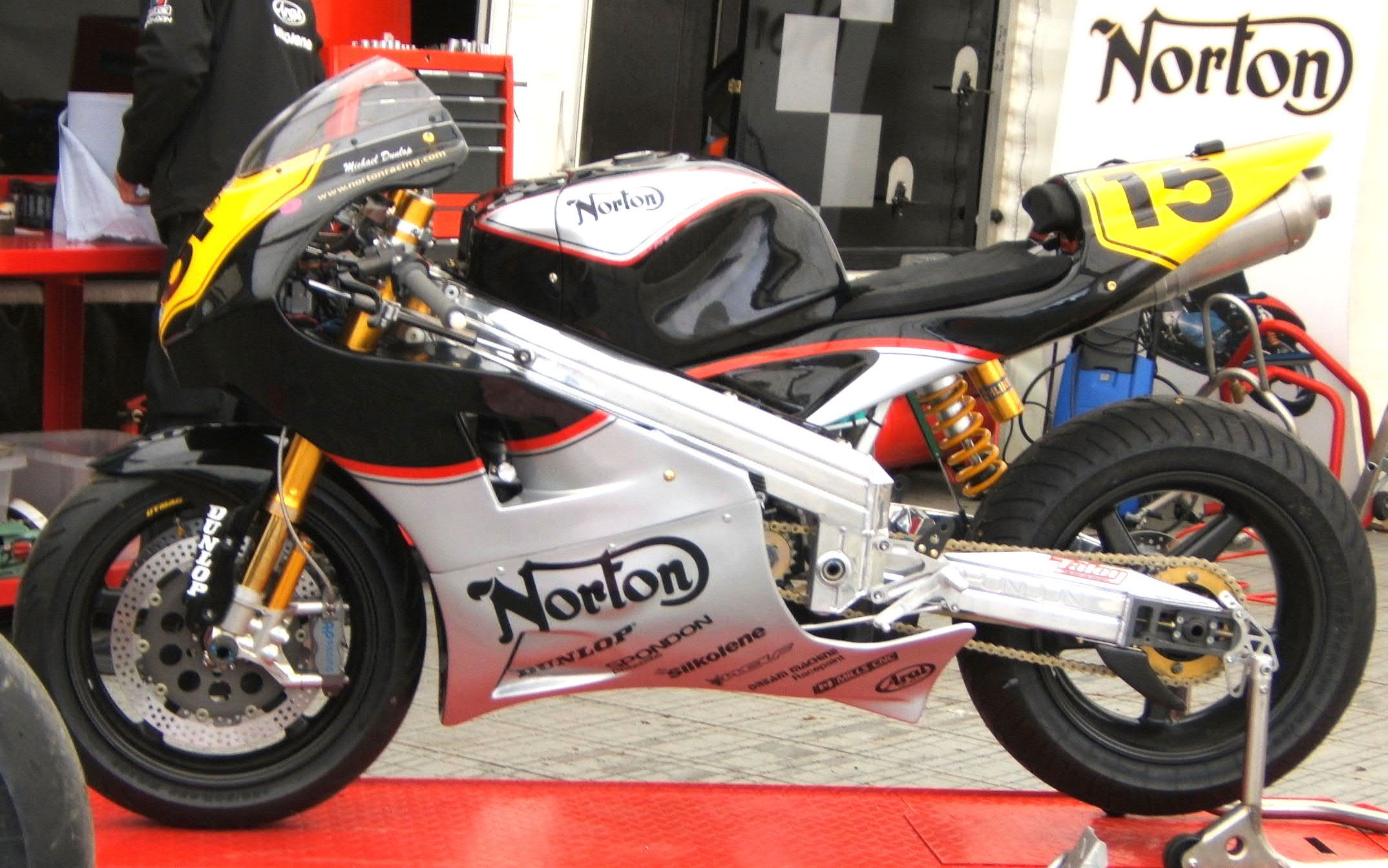
Michael Dunlop's updated Norton NRV588 rotary racer with Spondon frame and single, side-mounted rear suspension unit developed for the Norton company owner Stuart Garner, seen at the 2009 TT races

The Norton RCW588 is a Works Racing motorcycle, produced for the 1988 to 1994 racing seasons, initially with an air-cooled version of the road-going twin-rotor Wankel engine used in the Classic soon followed by watercooled versions from 1989.

Racing started in late 1987 with employee Malcolm Heath as development rider on a limited budget, then with a six-man team from 1989 including riders Trevor Nation and Simon Buckmaster. With major sponsor John Player & Sons, the Norton Rotary achieved significant racing success with riders Steve Spray, Robert Dunlop, and Ron Haslam, together with stand-in riders Andy McGladdery and Terry Rymer. Steve Hislop achieved a win at the 1992 Senior TT race, the first time Norton had won the class since 1961, and Ian Simpson won the 1994 British Superbike Championship. The unique Wankel engine configuration measured at a capacity of 588 cc was accepted by the FIM in 1990, allowing the Norton to enter the 500 cc Grand Prix premier racing class.

== Development ==
=== RC588 ===
Tracing its origins to the motor from the Norton Classic devised and developed by David Garside at BSA in the 1970s, the racing engine was nevertheless the creation of Brian Crighton, who joined the Norton factory at Shenstone, Staffordshire in 1984 from a background in electronic engineering to oversee the service department's maintenance of the Norton Commander for the Police Force, and was responsible for establishing Norton's return to racing.

After recognising the engine was capable of producing much more power, Crighton firstly received no backing from Norton management, instead developing the engine in his own time, until sanctioned by the factory in late 1987 with the prototype race bike debuted by Norton employee Malcolm Heath at Darley Moor.

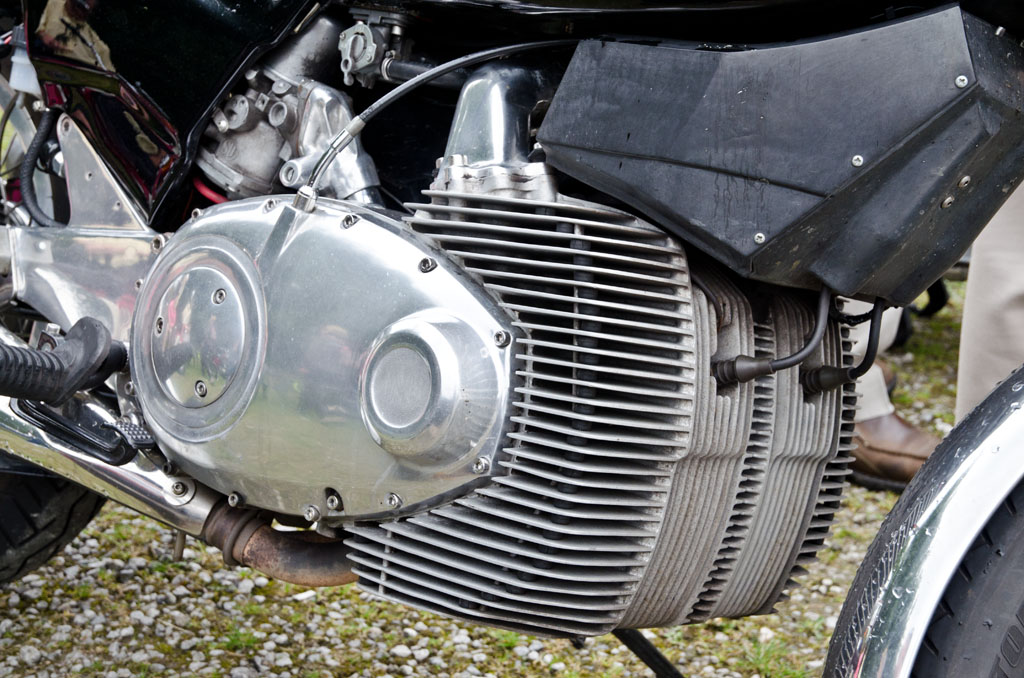
Road-going Norton Classic air-cooled engine with full cooling fins

Based on an ex-police bike engine, it was restricted to club-level racing as the ACU had not decided on how to categorise the rotary engine as it was so unusual.

One of the initial changes for racing was to reduce the cooling-fin area on the engine, as when racing, the machines were moving at much higher speeds than the road-going types, where traffic police and RAC breakdown patrols had experienced overheating when in slow-moving convoys. Also added was Ram Air induction from fairing-mounted air scoops, which Motorcycle Sport confirmed in 1988 that Crighton had used since 1972, "...some years before Honda, who later claimed it as one of their innovatory applications...", and a longer induction-length. Power output was stated to be raised from road-going 79 bhp to 130 bhp, or with maximum ram-effect at a high-speed circuit of 140 bhp.

The engine was basically similar to the road version, but fitted into a monoshock Spondon aluminium frame with Kayaba front forks and Dymag wheels. The revised induction system was simplified, abandoning the road system where the cooling air was routed through the engine rotors before being fed into the carburettors. Instead, exhaust-gas velocity was used with a venturi to create a low pressure area that dragged the air through the engine components and into the exhaust system.

Crighton confirmed the usual method of modifying a road engine for racing was to replace the essential components of crankshaft, conrods, pistons and camshafts – but the rotary had none of these. Even raising the compression ratio was extremely difficult, requiring re-engineered rotors and/or altered motion within the chambers. Instead, modifications were made in similar style to two-stroke engines, by changes to the internal ports controlling intake mixture and waste gases, in conjunction with enhanced carburation and exhaust gas extraction.

Initially the team raced with a limited budget in 1988 with riders Trevor Nation and Simon Buckmaster, having some sponsorship from Dunlop tyres, Duckham's oils, Renold chains and Amal carburettors. The roadgoing SU carburettors of CV type were replaced for racing by Amal slide-operated units.

Subsequent temporary riders covering for injuries included Terry Rymer and Andy McGladdery. The team won the British Formula One Championship with rider Steve Spray in 1989.

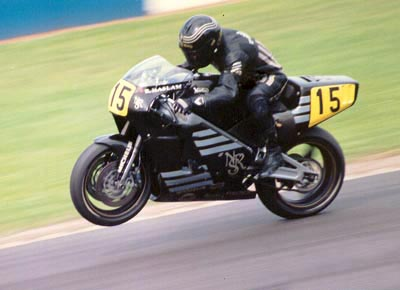
Ron Haslam on a Harris-framed JPS Norton NRS588 racer at the 1991 Donington British Grand Prix

Crighton left Norton in September 1990, following the appointment of Barry Symmons (previously chief of the Honda Britain motorcycle racing squad) as Race Team Manager in early 1990, with Crighton retained for consultancy work. Crighton subsequently developed a shadow-project which he named Roton, again with Spray, which competed in the Australian GP held at Eastern Creek circuit, placing 15th with one World Championship point.

Crighton aspired to pursue backing from Chris Oldfield, an Australian businessman and a potential investor who intended to manufacture the machines and run his own race team with Australian riders Grant Hodson and Wayne Clark.

A limited-production road-going version was subsequently developed, initially designated P55, becoming known as the Norton F1.

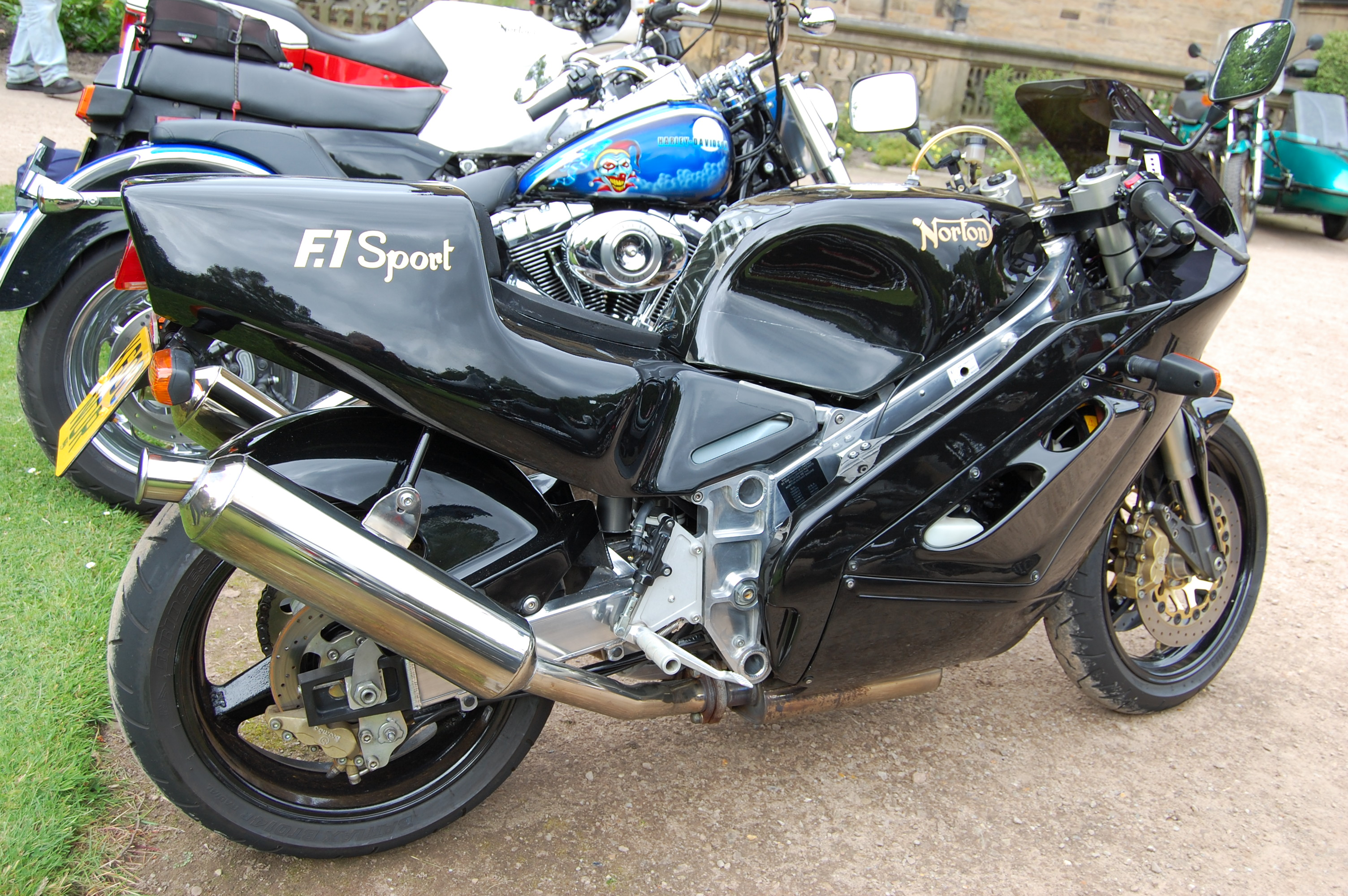
Road-going F1

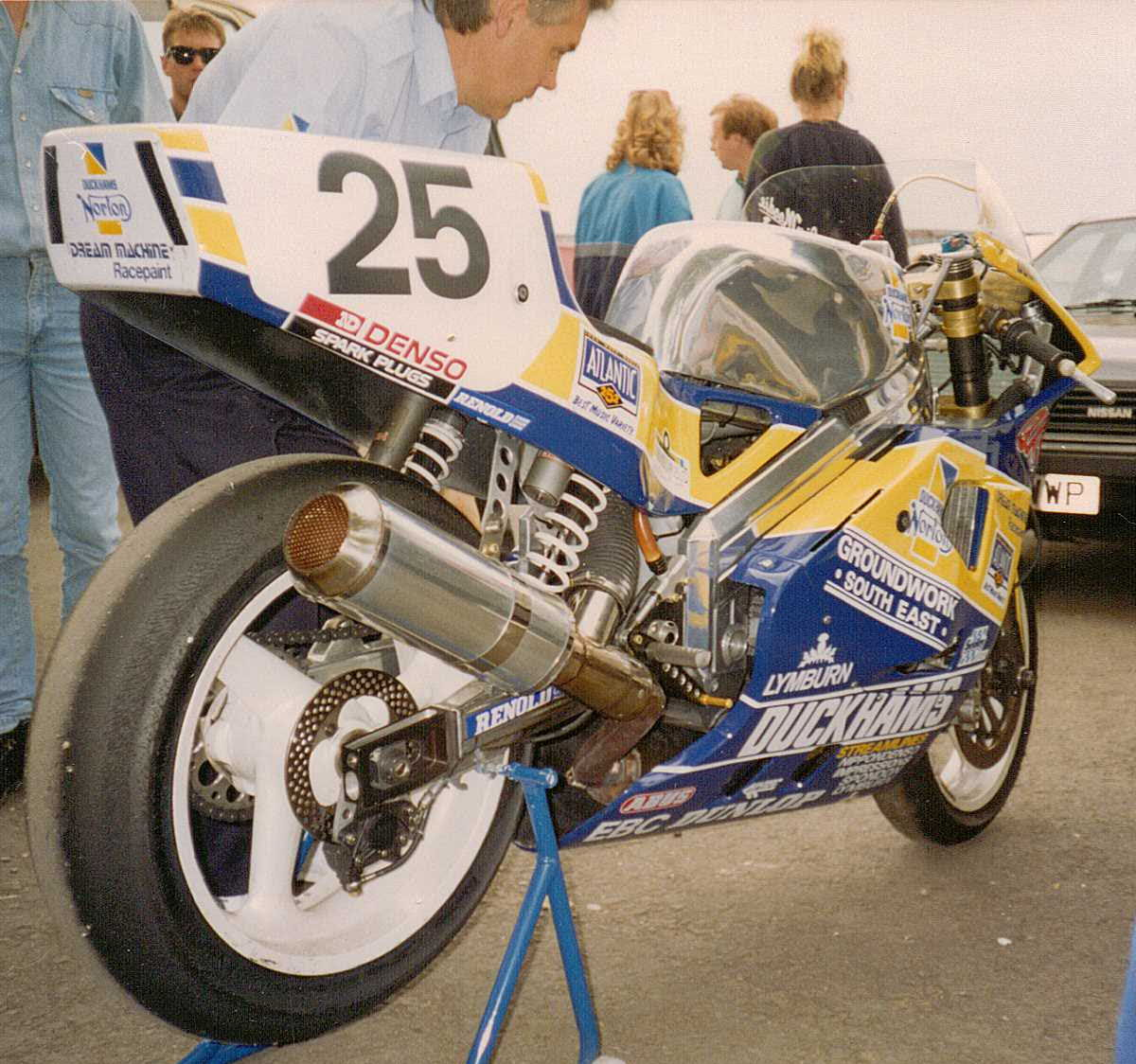
Brian Crighton with his Spondon-framed, twinshock Norton at Donington Park in 1993 (ridden by Jim Moodie)

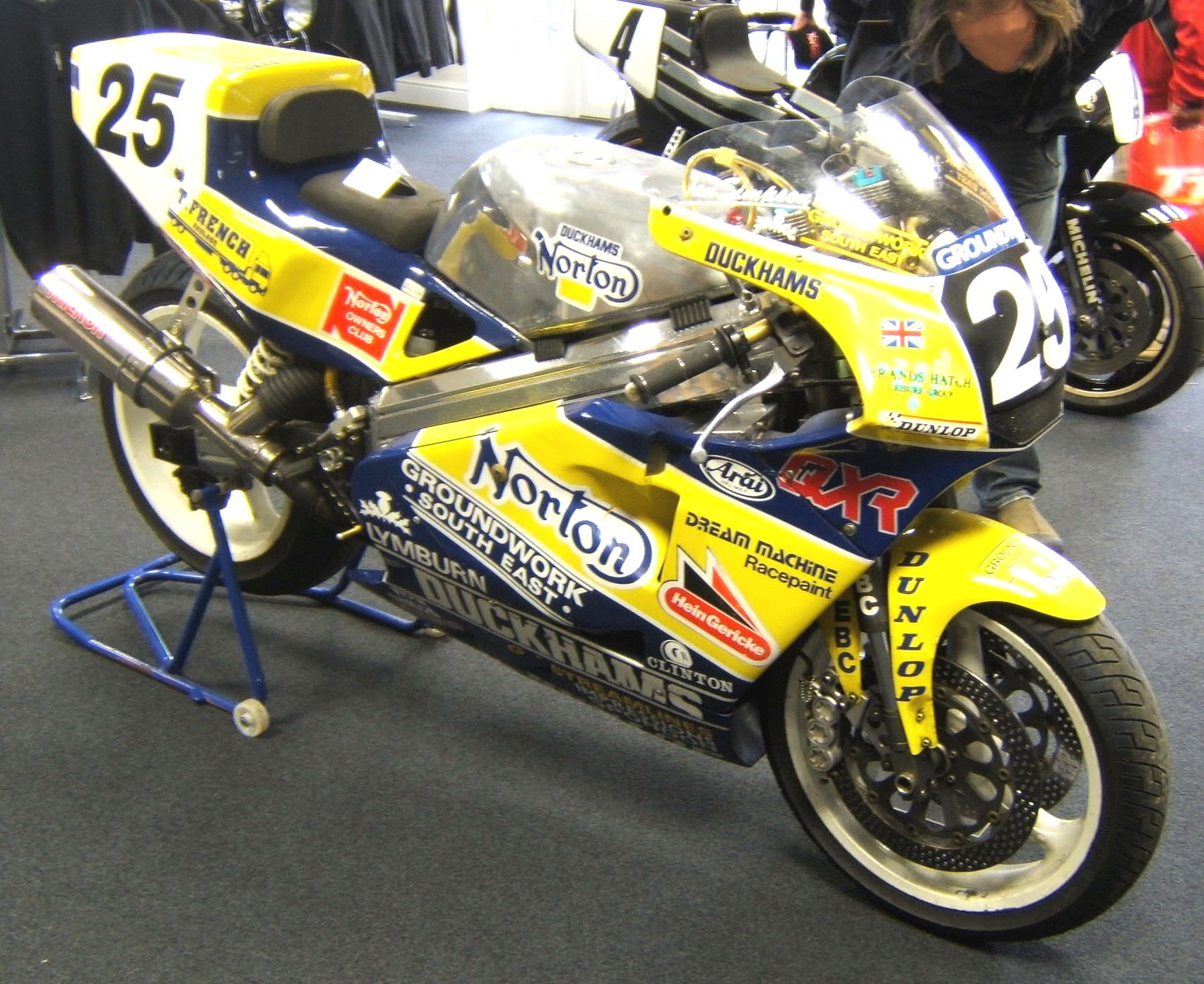
Ian Simpson's 1994 Championship-winning Crighton Norton RCW588 in its last guise wearing Duckham's oil company livery displayed at the 2009 TT races

== Racing results ==
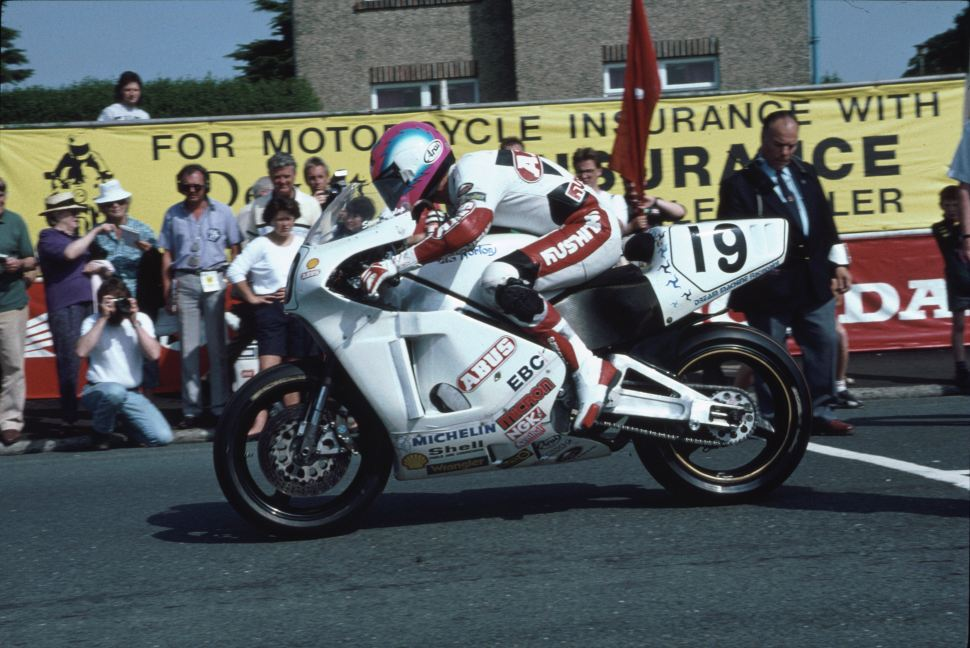
Steve Hislop on the 'White Charger' Norton at 1992 TT race startline

The RCW588 had a number of racing successes in the British Superbike Championship, and at various circuits including the Isle of Man TT, Cadwell Park, Mallory Park and Thruxton.

Ian Simpson won the British Superbike Championship in 1994 on a Team Crighton Norton rotary machine with Duckhams sponsorship, an oil brand name owned by BP.

== Legacy ==
Brian Crighton continued to develop the Rotary Norton NRV588 concept for Stuart Garner, owner of Norton Motorcycles Ltd based at Donington Hall, again using an aluminium twin-spar beam frame and swinging arm by Derbyshire-based frame specialist Spondon Engineering, which became fully owned by Norton in 2013.

=== CR700P ===
Crighton has further-developed his own machine, designated CR700P, with engine chambers enlarged to 700 cc, and using a sealed, pressurised-gas cooling system powered by an external, belt-driven pump circulating the gas through an intercooler mounted in the seat-tailpiece. This allows the engine, designated Rotron RT700, echoing the earlier 1990s era when he also used the term Rotron for his semi-works Norton rotary, to produce 200 bhp and remain within safe working temperatures.

=== CR700W ===
Engine geometry:

- Generating radius R = 71 mm
- Eccentricity e = 11.6 mm
- Equidistance a = 0.5 mm
- Rotor housing width B = 80 mm
- Chamber displacement V_{k} = 345 cm^{3}

In respect to the 588 engine it has a thinner intermediate plate of 22 mm and wider rotor housings of 80 mm, but after all it is 5 mm narrower overall. It produces 220 hp at 10500 rpm (p_{me} = 1.36 MPa) and 105 lbf · ft at 9500 rpm (p_{me} = 1.30 MPa).
