= Norton Classic =

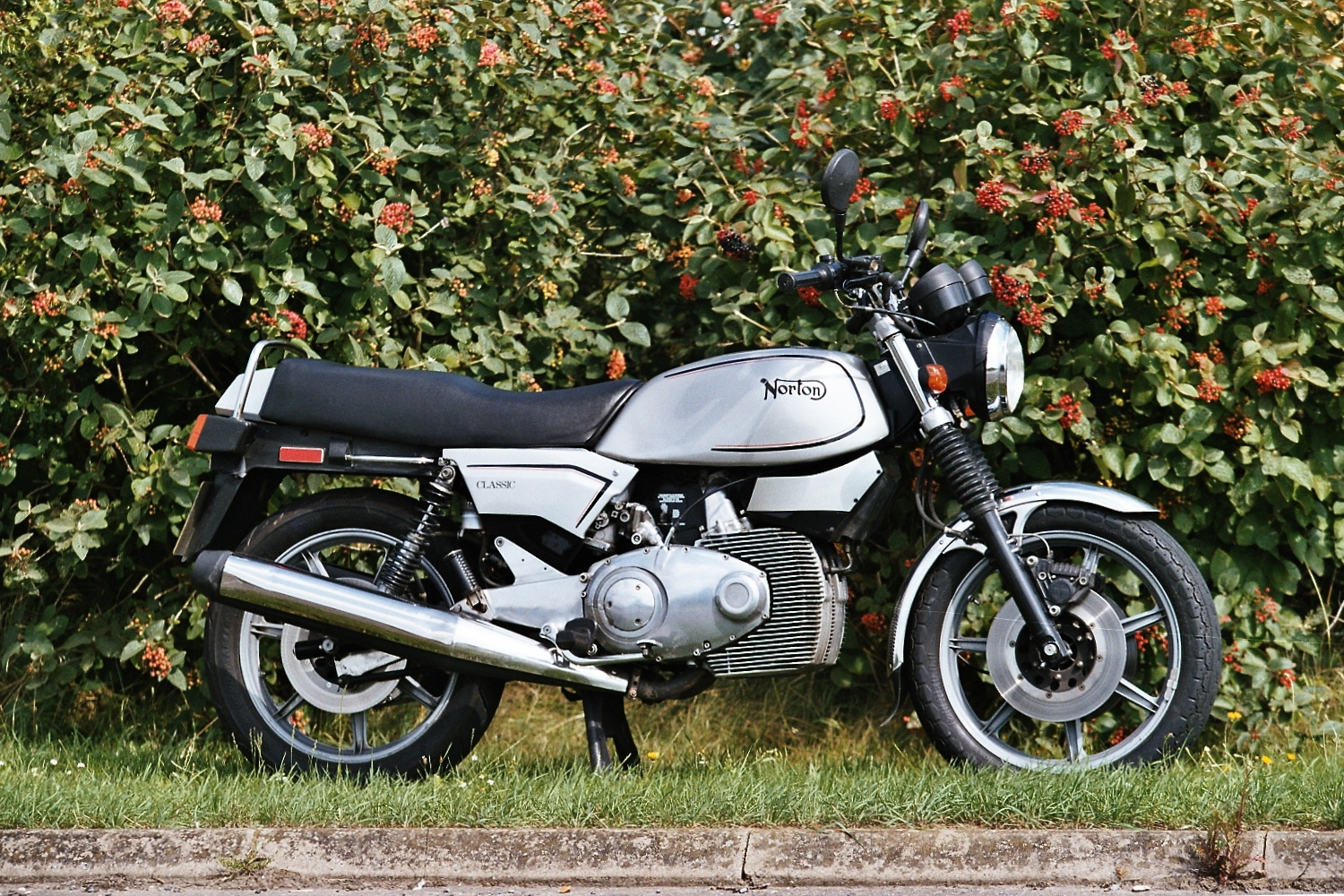
- Manufacturer: Norton Motorcycle Company
- Also called: P43
- Production: 1987
- Engine: 588 cc (35.9 cu in) air-cooled twin-rotor Wankel engine
- Transmission: duplex primary chain, 5-ratio gearbox, single-row final drive chain
- Wheelbase: 1,486 mm (58.5 in)
- Related: Norton Interpol 2, Norton F1, Norton Commander

The Norton Classic is a rotary-engined motorcycle built in 1987 by Norton as a special edition of just 100 machines.

== Engine development ==
The Classic used an air-cooled twin-rotor Wankel engine that had been developed by David Garside at BSA's Umberslade Hall research facility. Garside, who had been impressed by the air-cooled single-rotor Fichtel & Sachs engine in the Hercules motorcycle, installed a bought-in F&S engine into a BSA B25 'Starfire' frame as a "proof of concept". This proved reliable and smooth, but under-powered. Having obtained a licence from Felix Wankel in 1972, Garside then created a prototype twin-rotor engine (with F&S rotors) which doubled the capacity of the earlier test "mule". This twin-rotor engine was installed in a BSA A65 frame.

Wankel engines run very hot, so in addition to its very deep cooling fins Garside gave this air-cooled motor interior air-cooling. Air was drawn through a forward-facing filter situated to provide a ram air effect. This air passed through the interior of the rotors and then into a large pressed-steel plenum before entering the combustion chambers via twin carburettors. The plenum (which doubled as the bike's semi-monocoque frame) enabled the transfer of much of the heat to the surrounding atmosphere. The carburation process further reduced temperatures via the process of evaporation. Even so, at 50 °C the fuel-air mixture was still hotter than ideal, and the engine's volumetric efficiency remained somewhat impaired. The eccentric shaft's main bearings and the inlet manifolds were fed by oil-injection lubrication, and the fuel-air mix also carried residual mist of oil from the interior of the rotors, which helped to lubricate the rotor tips.

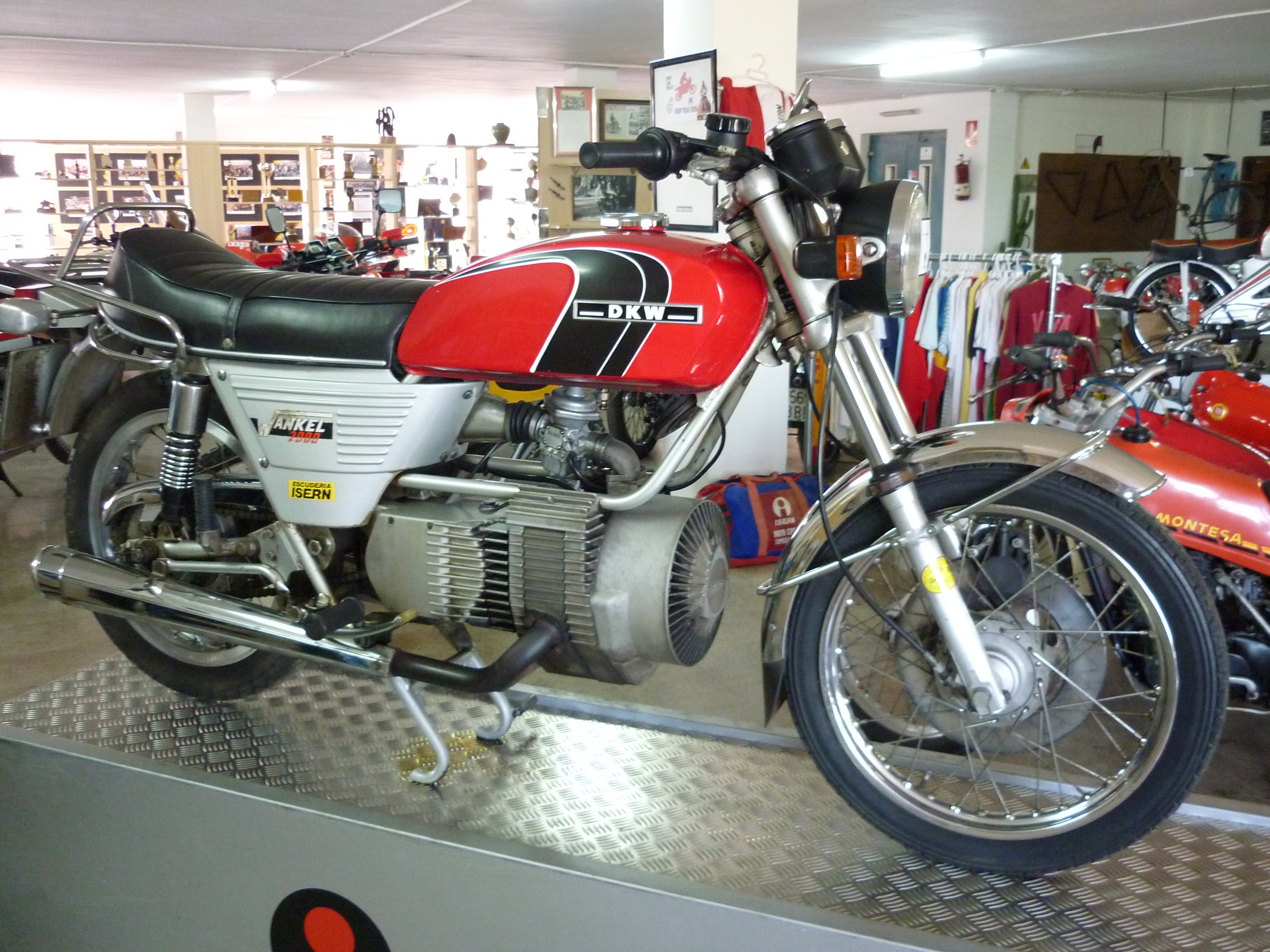
DKW Hercules with the F&S engine that was developed by Garside to become the Norton motor

=== Engine geometry ===
- Generating radius R = 71 mm
- Eccentricity e = 11.6 mm
- Equidistance a = 0.5 mm
- Rotor housing width B = 68.2 mm
- Chamber displacement V_{k} = 294 cm^{3}
- Compression ratio ε = 9.2:1

== The Classic motorcycle ==
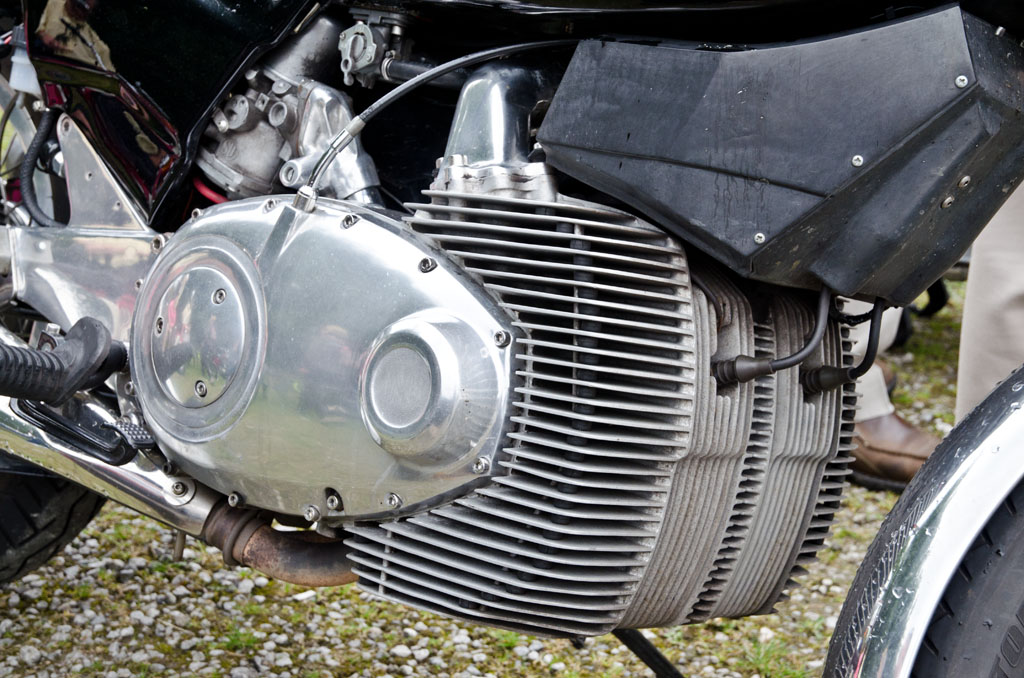
1988 Classic air cooled engine

While its engine was revolutionary, in other respects, such as appearance, suspension and brakes, the Norton Classic was a conventional twin-shock roadster. The fork stanchions were protected by rubber gaiters; and a full enclosure protected the final-drive chain. The air-cooled Classic was lighter and more powerful than its only Wankel competitor in production, the over-complicated single-rotor Suzuki RE-5 motorcycle (which had liquid-cooled jackets and an oil-cooled rotor).

The Classic was discontinued after a limited production run of 100 motorcycles, and was succeeded by the liquid-cooled Norton Commander. (Note: Norton Motors Ltd of Lichfield continue to support Norton Wankel engines. (The firm is to be distinguished from Norton Motorcycles Ltd of Donnington Park, the new company that manufactures the updated Norton Commando)).

== Wankel engines in motorcycles and aircraft ==
Compared to pistons, the rotors of a Wankel engine are massive and need time to warm up; yet, as NSU found to their cost with their Ro80 car, neither bikers nor car drivers have proved patient enough to give the engines time to reach operating temperature, and this impatience adversely affected reliability.

The Wankel's virtues of smoothness, compactness and lightness should be particularly suitable for aircraft, especially since the start-up procedure and the taxi to the runway gives ample time for warm-up. However, although wankels have been fitted into gliders and light aircraft such as the ARV Super2, such engines are still uncommon in aviation.

Perhaps inevitably, the Norton Classic's Wankel engine was further developed at Staverton into the MidWest aero-engine. The Midwest engine's output increased from BSA's 85 bhp to nearly 110 bhp by improving volumetric efficiency as follows: cooling air was pumped under pressure by a belt-driven centrifugal fan through the interior of the rotors, but then dumped overboard. Filtered induction air at ambient pressure was then drawn into the combustion chambers.

== Bibliography ==
Perkins, Kris (1991). Norton Rotaries. The Crowood Press. ISBN 978-1-85532-181-6.

Magrath, Derek (1991). Norton the Complete Story. Osprey Publishing. ISBN 978-1852235451.

Development of the Norton Rotary Motorcycle Engine', D W Garside, SAE paper 821068
