= Plenum chamber =

Chamber containing a fluid under pressure

A plenum chamber is a pressurised housing containing a fluid (typically air) at positive pressure. One of its functions is to equalise pressure for more even distribution, compensating for irregular supply or demand. It is typically relatively large in volume and thus has relatively low velocity compared to the system's other components. In wind tunnels, rockets, and many flow applications, it is a chamber upstream on the fluid flow where the fluid initially resides (approximately at rest). It can also work as an acoustic silencer.

== Examples ==
Examples of plenum chambers include those used with:

- Superchargers
- Hovercraft
- Corliss steam engines
- Raised floors and false ceilings in equipment rooms
- Some organs (to supplement the bellows)
- A number of aerophones, such as the bag of bagpipes and the slow air chamber of the Native American flute
- Plenum chamber anesthetic vaporizers
- Rocket motor combustion chambers, which may have a section near the nozzle that is free of the propellant charge to improve mixing and combustion
- Nuclear waste burning reactor rods

== Etymology ==
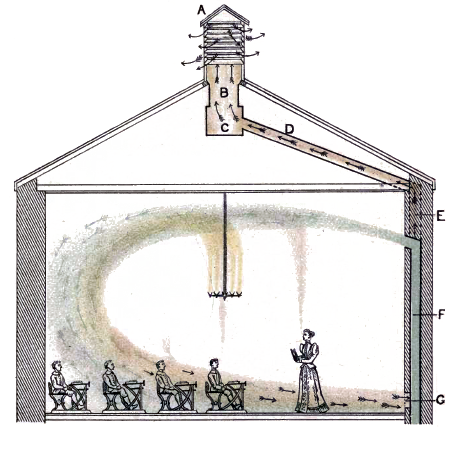
Schoolroom ventilation on the plenum system

The term "plenum" was coined in the 1670s, derived from Latin adjective plenus ("filled, full"). The usage originates from classical theories of physics and the notion that "nature abhors a vacuum". These gave rise to the notion of 17th century 'plenum' as the opposite of vacuum, and all thing "being either Plenum or Vacuum".

By the 19th century, the development of mechanical fans and industrial machinery had provided another, more technical use. This referred to "a system of artificial ventilation", which used a pressure raised slightly above atmospheric pressure, in contrast to the "vacuum system" which used a pressure below atmospheric. At a time when high pressure steam or hydraulic systems were well established, these were a distinct set of systems based on low pressure and high volume flows.

== Supercharging ==
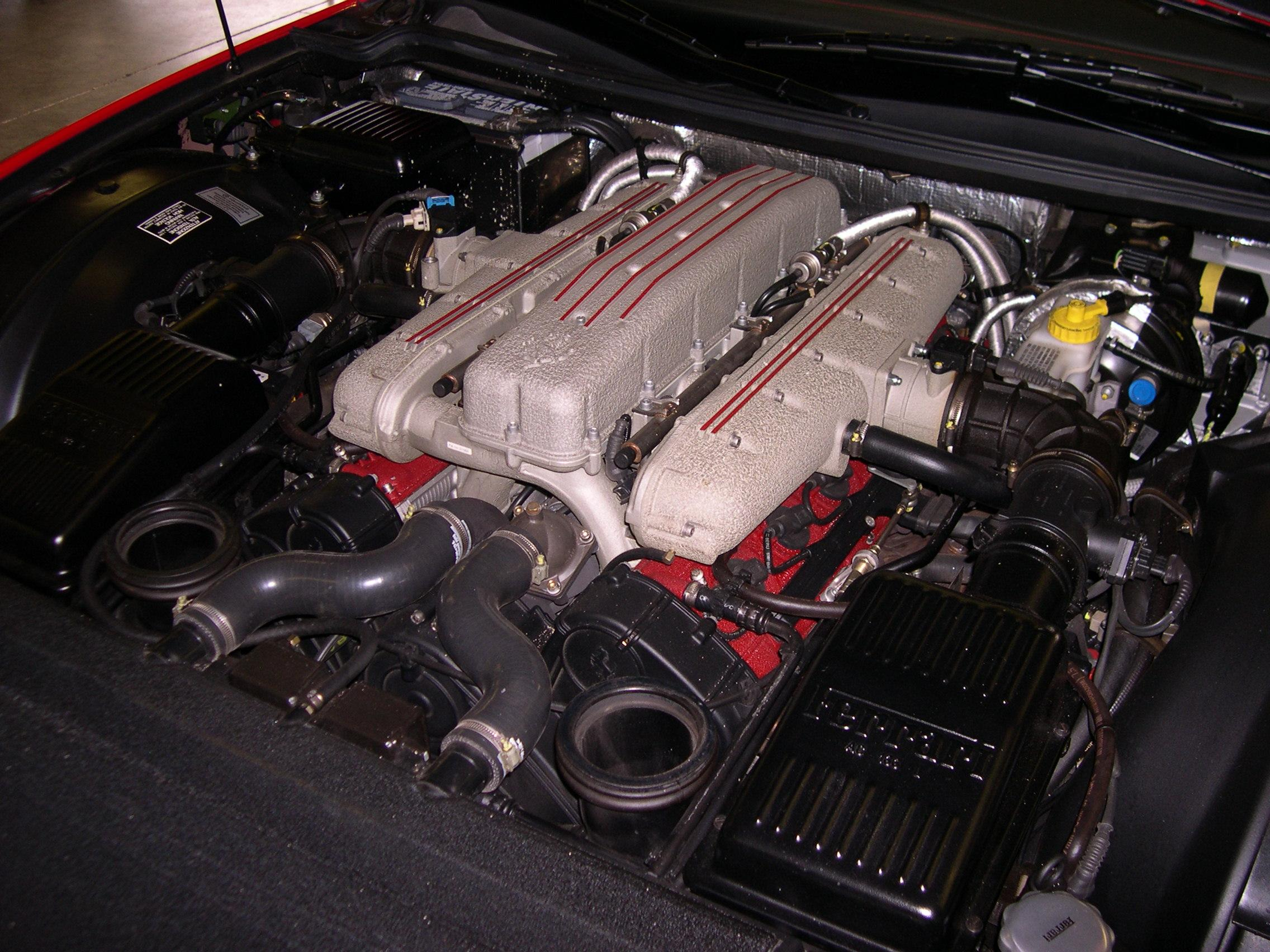
V12 engine (non-supercharged), showing plenum chamber

Supercharged piston engines typically use many cylinders arranged in-line and one or two superchargers. Superchargers deliver air at a relatively constant rate, while cylinders demand it in a varying manner, as the valves open and as piston speed varies through the stroke. Simple direct ducting would give problems where the nearest cylinders received more airflow. The pulsating demand from the cylinders would also show problems of either pressure waves in the duct, or a shortage of inlet air towards the end of the inlet phase.

The solution is to provide a large-volume plenum chamber between the inlet and the cylinders. This has two benefits: it evens out the difference in path restriction between cylinders (distribution across space), secondly it provides a large-volume buffer against pressure changes (distribution over time).

For non-supercharged / normally aspirated engines see Airbox.

== Norton Classic ==
Norton Classic with twin-rotor Wankel engine

The Norton Classic was a motorcycle whose air-cooled twin-rotor Wankel engine was developed by David Garside at BSA. Wankel engines run very hot, so Garside gave this air-cooled motor additional interior air-cooling. Air was drawn through a forward-facing filter situated to provide a ram air effect. This air passed through the interior of the rotors and then into a large pressed-steel plenum before entering the combustion chambers via twin carburettors. The plenum (which doubled as the bike's semi-monocoque frame) enabled the transfer of much of the heat to the surrounding atmosphere. The carburation process further reduced temperatures via the heat of evaporation. Even so, at 50 °C the fuel-air mixture was still hotter than ideal, and the engine's volumetric efficiency remained somewhat impaired. The eccentric shaft's main bearings and the inlet manifolds were fed by oil-injection lubrication, and the fuel-air mix also carried residual mist of oil from the interior of the rotors, which helped to lubricate the rotor tips.

== Hovercraft ==
Hovercraft schematic

Practical hovercraft use a peripheral skirt system, where the air from the lift fans is routed to a narrow slot around the edge of the hull, and bound by a flexible skirt. Distribution of this air from the fans to the periphery is through a large-volume plenum chamber, so as to provide even distribution of airflow without sensitivity to the length of the direct path.

== Nuclear Waste burning reactor rods ==
Molten salts consisting of chlorinated nuclear waste are contained in atomic fission reactor rods. This Alvin M. Weinberg et al design has a liquid fuel instead of a solid fuel. The gas plenum is above the fuel and below a diving bell style vent for the reaction products. This allows for convection currents and fluid flow eliminating the possibility for gas products to build up and rupture as in a light water reactor.
