= Norton Interpol 2 =

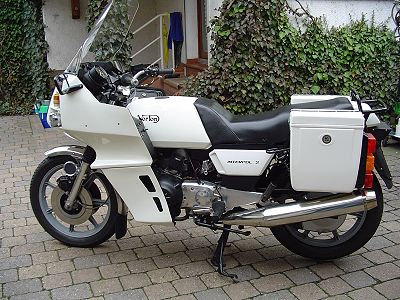
- Manufacturer: Norton Motors (1978) Limited
- Also called: P41
- Production: 1984–89
- Engine: 588 cc air-cooled twin-rotor Wankel engine
- Power: 85 bhp (63 kW)
- Transmission: duplex primary chain, 5-ratio gearbox, single-row final drive chain
- Tires: 18 inch WM2 front, 18 inch WM3 rear
- Wheelbase: 1,486 mm (58.5 in)
- Dimensions: L: 1,805 mm (71.1 in); W: 710 mm (28 in)
- Fuel capacity: 22.5 litres (5 Imperial gallons)

The Interpol 2 is a Norton motorcycle produced from 1984 to 1989. It has an air-cooled twin rotor 588 cc (35.9 cu in) Wankel engine.

Its model name refers to the Norton Interpol, a 1970s police version of the Norton Commando. However, the Interpol was a piston-engined model and is mechanically unrelated to the Interpol 2.

Towards the end of the production run one machine was built for development purposes with a new water-cooled version of Norton's twin-rotor Wankel engine. This machine was designated Interpol 2A. When production of the Interpol 2 ceased it was succeeded by the P52 version of the Norton Commander.

Norton did not sell the Interpol 2 to the general public. Sales were restricted to fleet customers: civilian police forces, military police forces (particularly the Royal Air Force Police), and the RAC.
