= Norton Commander (motorcycle) =

British motorcycle

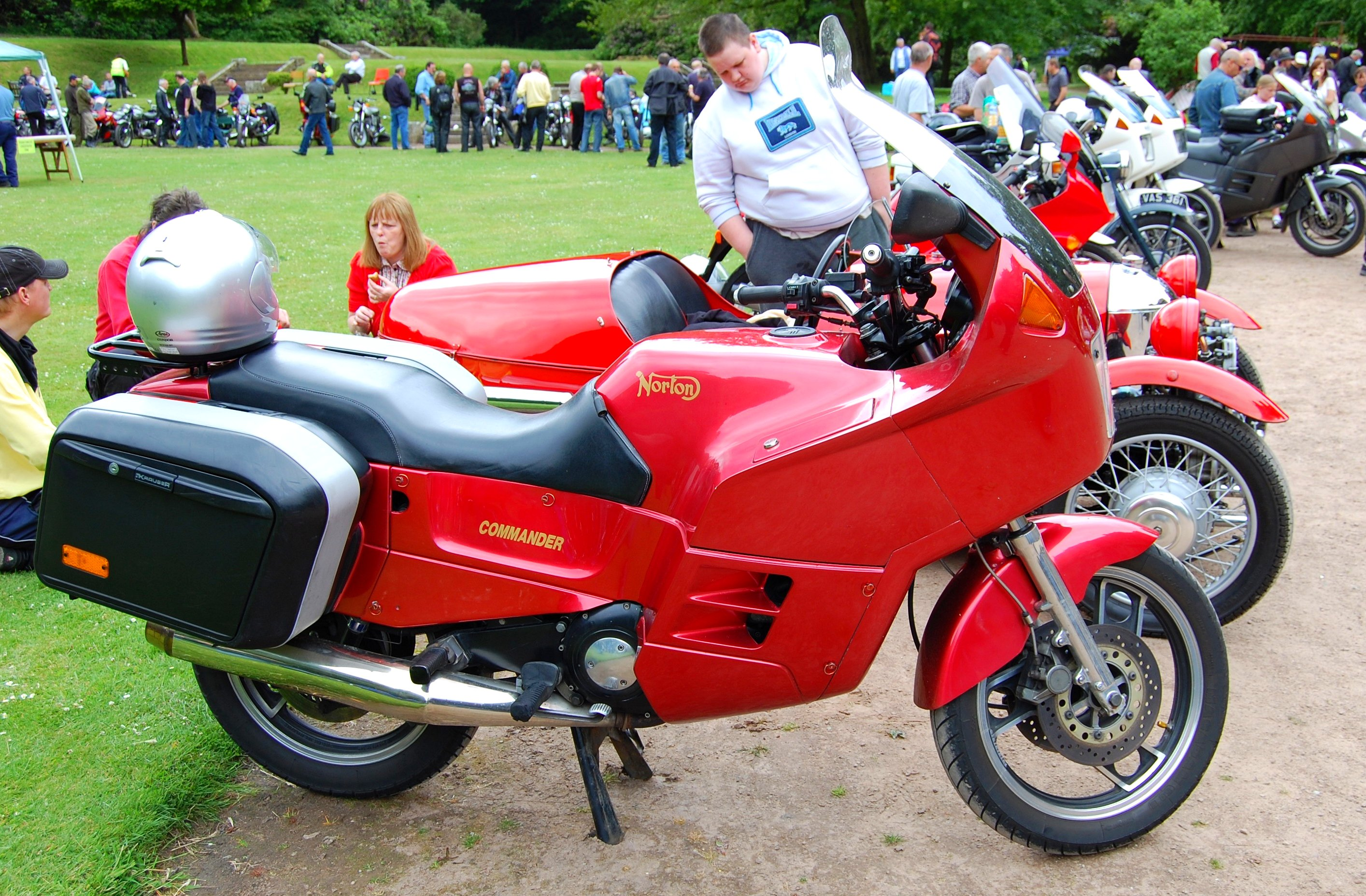
- Manufacturer: Norton Motors Limited
- Production: 1988–1992; 253 units produced in total
- Engine: 588 cc water-cooled twin-rotor Wankel engine
- Power: 85 bhp (63 kW) at 9000 rpm
- Torque: 75.4 Nm at 7000 rpm
- Transmission: duplex primary chain, 5-ratio gearbox, single-row final drive chain
- Tires: Front: MT 2.15 x 18 inch; Rear: 2.75 x 18 inch in cast aluminium
- Wheelbase: 1486 mm
- Dimensions: L: 2200 mm W: 880 mm H: 1470 mm
- Seat height: 830 mm
- Fuel capacity: 23 litres including a reserve of 3 litres

The Commander was a Norton motorcycle with a Wankel rotary engine.

The first Norton Wankel motorcycle was the 1987 Classic using an air-cooled engine, built as a special edition of just 100 machines. It was followed by the air-cooled Interpol 2 model.

The Commander was a liquid-cooled successor to the Interpol 2, liquid cooling being adopted for greater power and reliability. The Commander's final-drive chain was protected by a full enclosure. Some cycle parts (such as wheels, forks, switchgear, clocks & brakes) were bought-in Yamaha items from the XJ900.

Two types of Commander were built. The P52 was a single-seat model equipped for police use. The second was the dual-seat P53 civilian tourer. Both the P52 and P53 had panniers integral with their fibreglass bodywork. The P53 bodywork was later revised to have detachable Krauser K2 panniers.

== See also ==
- Norton F1
- List of motorcycles by type of engine
