= David Garside =

British motorcycle designer

David W. Garside is an inventor and former project engineer at BSA's Kitts Green research facility. He is notable for having developed an air-cooled twin-rotor Wankel motorcycle engine which powered the Norton Classic road bike. Although the Classic was not the first production rotary-engined bike, it was significantly lighter, smoother, more powerful and better-handling than the contemporary Suzuki RE5.

== Personal history ==
In his book "Norton Rotaries", Kris Perkins states that "David Garside could rightly be called the father of the Norton Rotary". Garside studied mathematics and mechanical engineering at Emmanuel College, Cambridge, where he obtained a first class degree. He served an apprenticeship with Rolls Royce, and after a spell at the CEGB, he returned to Rolls Royce to work on diesel rotaries. He later moved to BSA as a development engineer at Kitts Green. After BSA was subsumed into NVT, over 90% of BSA's research projects were cancelled, but Garside managed to persuade NVT's boss, Dennis Poore to continue with the rotary programme. The project moved to Shenstone, near Lichfield, where production of bikes such as the Interpol took place.

== The Norton Classic ==
Norton Classic

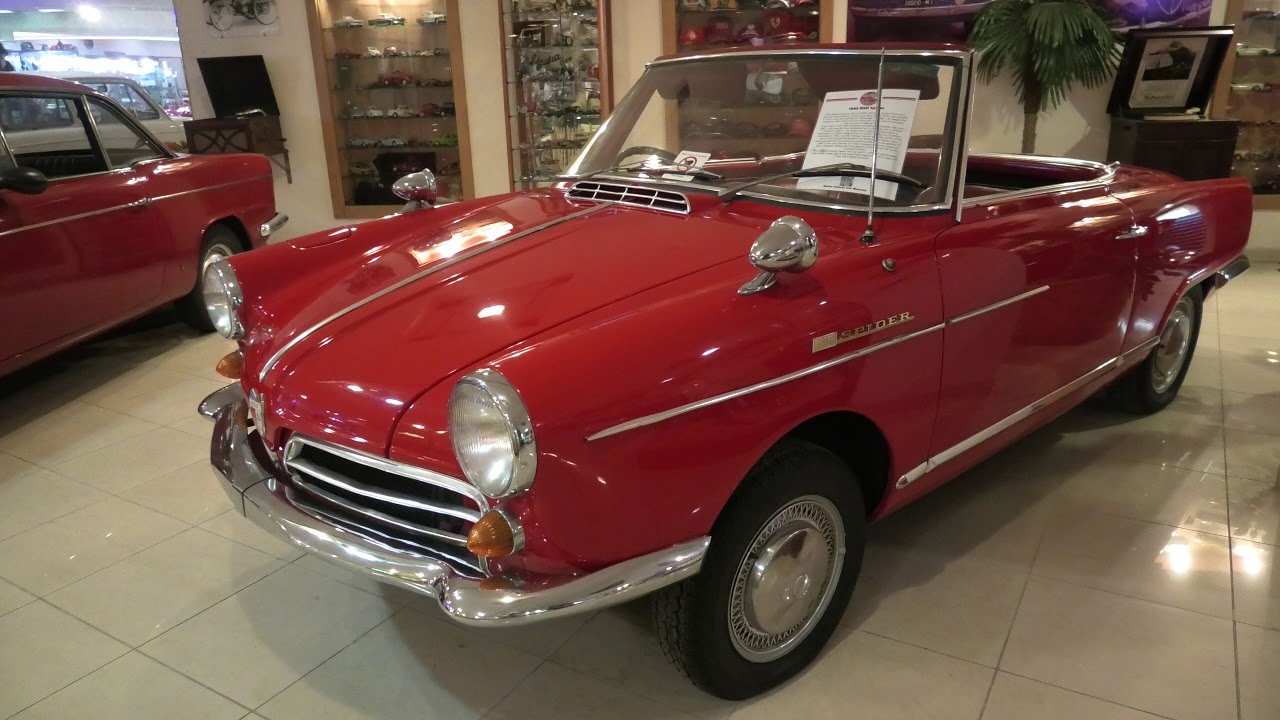
NSU Spider Wankel

Garside, who had been impressed by the Fichtel & Sachs engine in both the NSU Spider sports-car and a snowmobile, installed a bought-in F&S air-cooled single-rotor engine into a BSA B25 'Starfire' frame as a "proof of concept". This proved reliable and smooth, but under-powered. Garside then created a prototype twin-rotor engine (with F&S rotors), which doubled the capacity of the earlier test "mule". This twin-rotor engine was installed in a BSA A65 frame. (In Europe, DKW later used a fan-cooled single-rotor F&S engine in the DKW Hercules motorcycle, but this was less radical and much less powerful than the Norton Classic).

Wankel engines run very hot, so Garside gave this air-cooled motor additional interior air-cooling. Filtered air was drawn through an intake that was forward-facing to provide a ram air effect. This air was channelled initially to the rotating mainshaft and through the interior of the two rotors, then entering a large pressed-steel plenum before entering the combustion chambers via twin carburettors. The plenum, which doubled as the bike's semi-monocoque frame, enabled the transfer of much of the heat to the surrounding atmosphere. (This idea was taken from the monocoque Ariel Arrow). The carburation process further reduced temperatures via the heat of evaporation.

Even so, at 50 °C (122 °F) the fuel-air mixture was still hotter than ideal, and the engine's volumetric efficiency remained somewhat impaired. The eccentric shaft's main bearings and the inlet manifolds were fed by oil-injection lubrication, and the fuel-air mix also carried residual mist of oil from the interior of the rotors, which helped to lubricate the rotor tips.

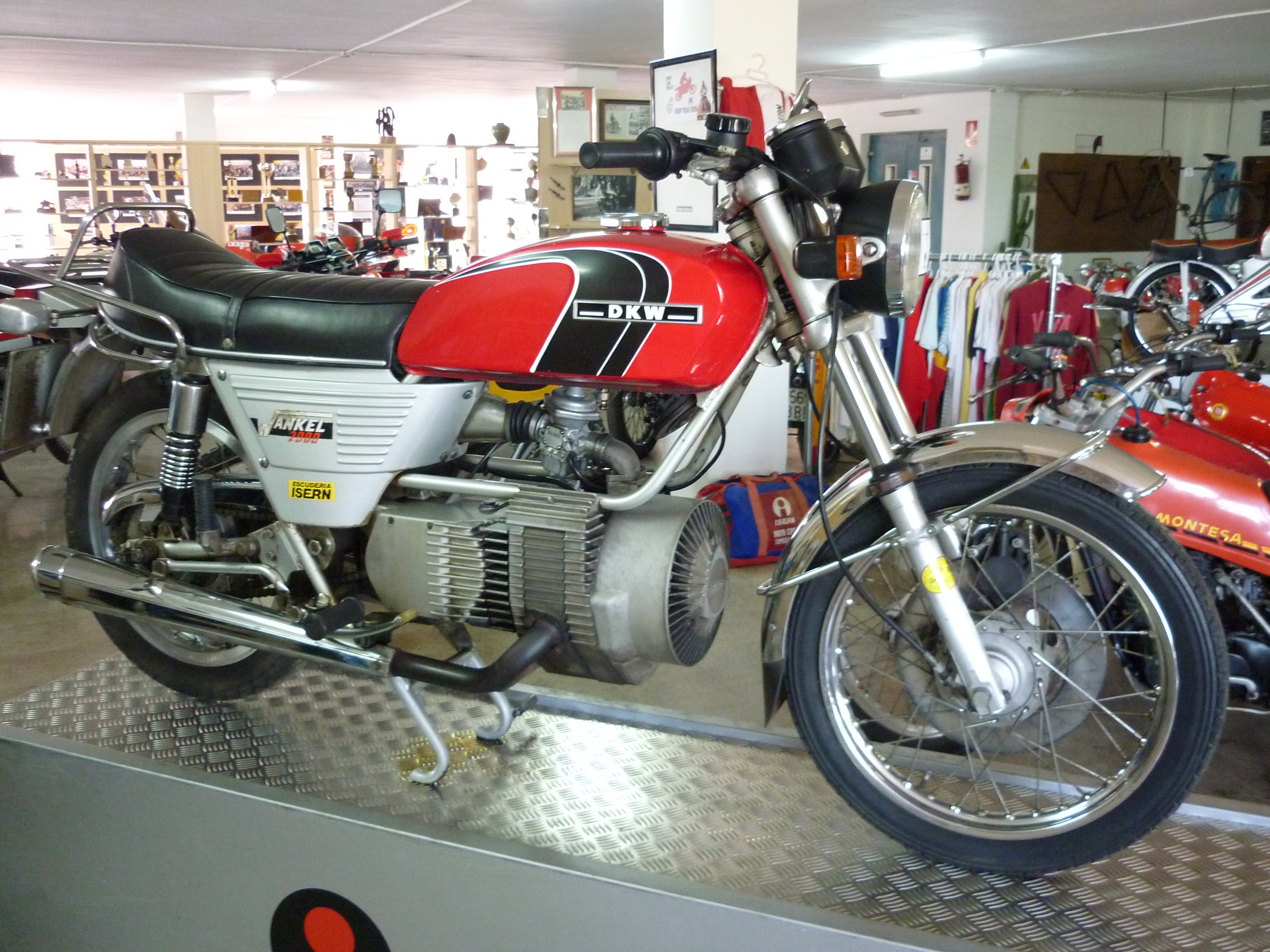
DKW Hercules branded bike with fan-cooled F&S engine

== Notable innovations ==
ARV Super2 with MidWest AE110

Figure 1. The Wankel KKM cycle: A: Apex of the rotor.; B: The eccentric shaft.; The white portion is the lobe of the eccentric shaft.; The distance between A and B remains constant.; Produces three power pulses each revolution of the rotor.; Gives one power pulse per revolution of the output shaft.

To address the deficiencies of the air-cooled Norton Wankel engine, Garside went on to develop SPARCS (self-pressurising-air rotor cooling system), a system that utilises self-pressurising blow-by gases as a cooling medium, absorbing higher levels of heat from the engine core and dispersing the heat by means of an external heat exchanger. This system provides superior heat rejection than standard air cooling methods. The SPARCS system also enables much lower friction losses than either an oil-cooled Wankel engine or a conventional internal combustion piston engine.

In addition to SPARCS, Garside also filed a patent in 2011 to develop a rotary exhaust expander unit or CREEV (compound rotary engine for electric vehicles) for use with Wankel rotary engines. The CREEV system acts as an ‘exhaust reactor’ by consuming unburned exhaust products while expansion occurs, reducing overall emissions and improving thermal efficiency.

In 2015, David Garside signed a licensing agreement with UK Midlands based engineers Advanced Innovative Engineering (UK) Ltd for exclusive use of his patents in their next generation Wankel rotary engines.

== Aero-engine derivative ==
The Norton Wankel engine was further developed at Staverton airport into the MidWest aero-engine. The MidWest engine's output increased from BSA's 85 bhp to nearly 110 bhp by improving volumetric efficiency. This was achieved by feeding pressurised air to cool the rotors which was then dumped overboard (rather than fed to the combustion chambers); the engine received a fuel-air mixture with cool ambient air. MidWest also successfully replaced the Tillotson carburetors used by Norton with an electronic fuel-injection system. This worked well, thereby obviating the need for any "carb heat" provision. The Midwest engine was fitted to at least two ARV Super2 aircraft.
