= Norton F1 =

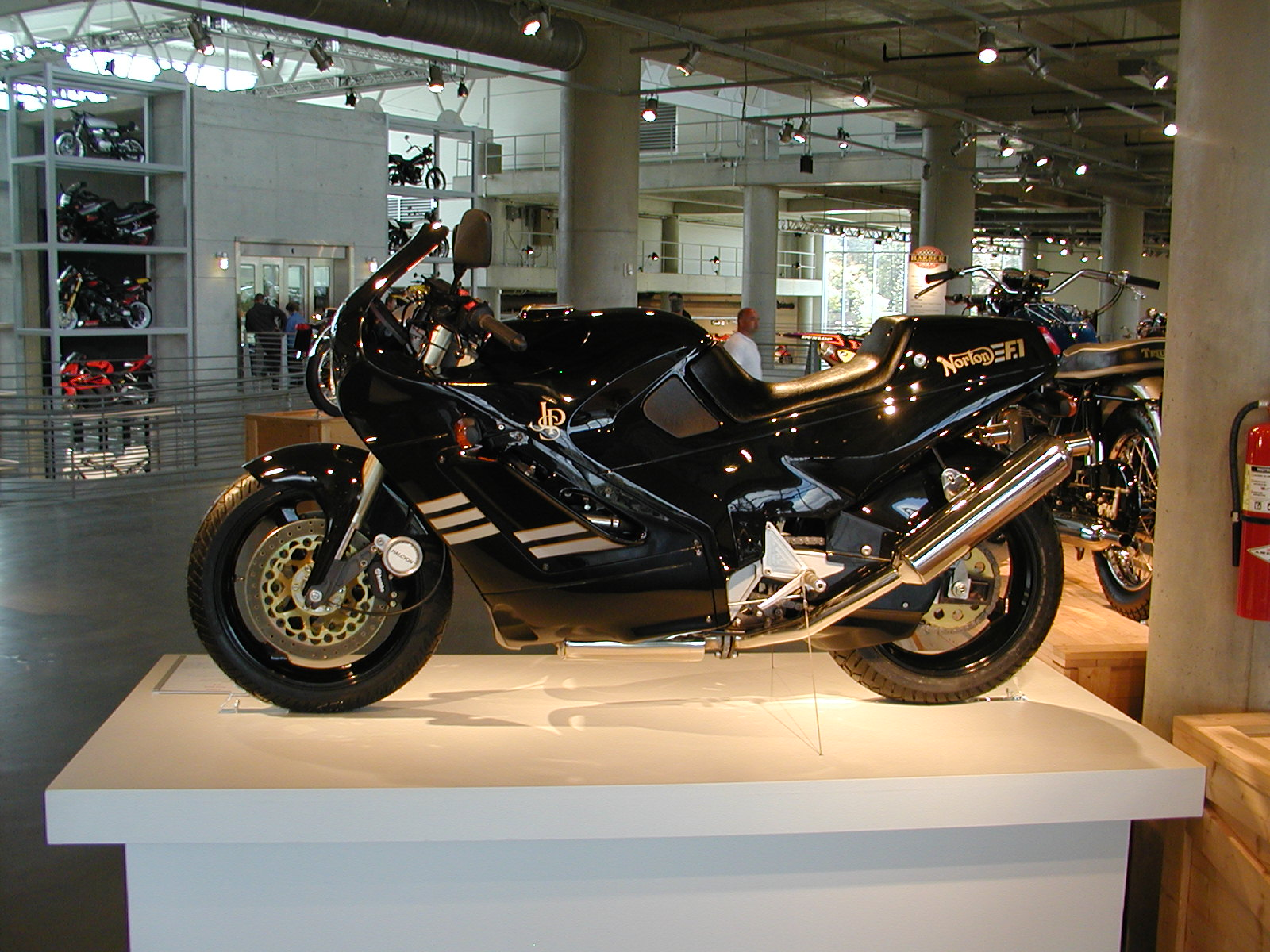
- Manufacturer: Norton Motors Limited
- Also called: P55
- Production: 1990–1991
- Engine: 588 cc (35.9 cu in) liquid-cooled twin-rotor Wankel engine
- Transmission: duplex primary chain, 5-ratio gearbox, single-row final drive chain
- Tires: MT3.5 x 17 inch cast aluminium
- Wheelbase: 1465mm
- Dimensions: L: 2060mm W: 740mm H: 1130mm
- Fuel capacity: 20 L (4.4 imp gal; 5.3 US gal)

The Norton F1 is a road-going sports motorcycle that Norton based on its RCW588 racing motorcycle. The F1 was offered in only one livery: black with gold decals and grey and gold stripes, to reflect John Player's sponsorship of Norton's race team. It was distinctive for using a 588 cc liquid-cooled twin-rotor Wankel engine. This unit was developed from the motor in the Norton Commander.

The F1 engine produced 94bhp @ 9500rpm.
