= Stuart Garner =

British businessman (born 1968)

- Born: Stuart James Garner; November 1968 (age 57); Derbyshire, England
- Occupation: Businessman
- Title: Former owner and CEO, Norton Motorcycle Company
- Term: 2008-2020
- Spouse: Susie Lodge (m.2018)
- Children: 3

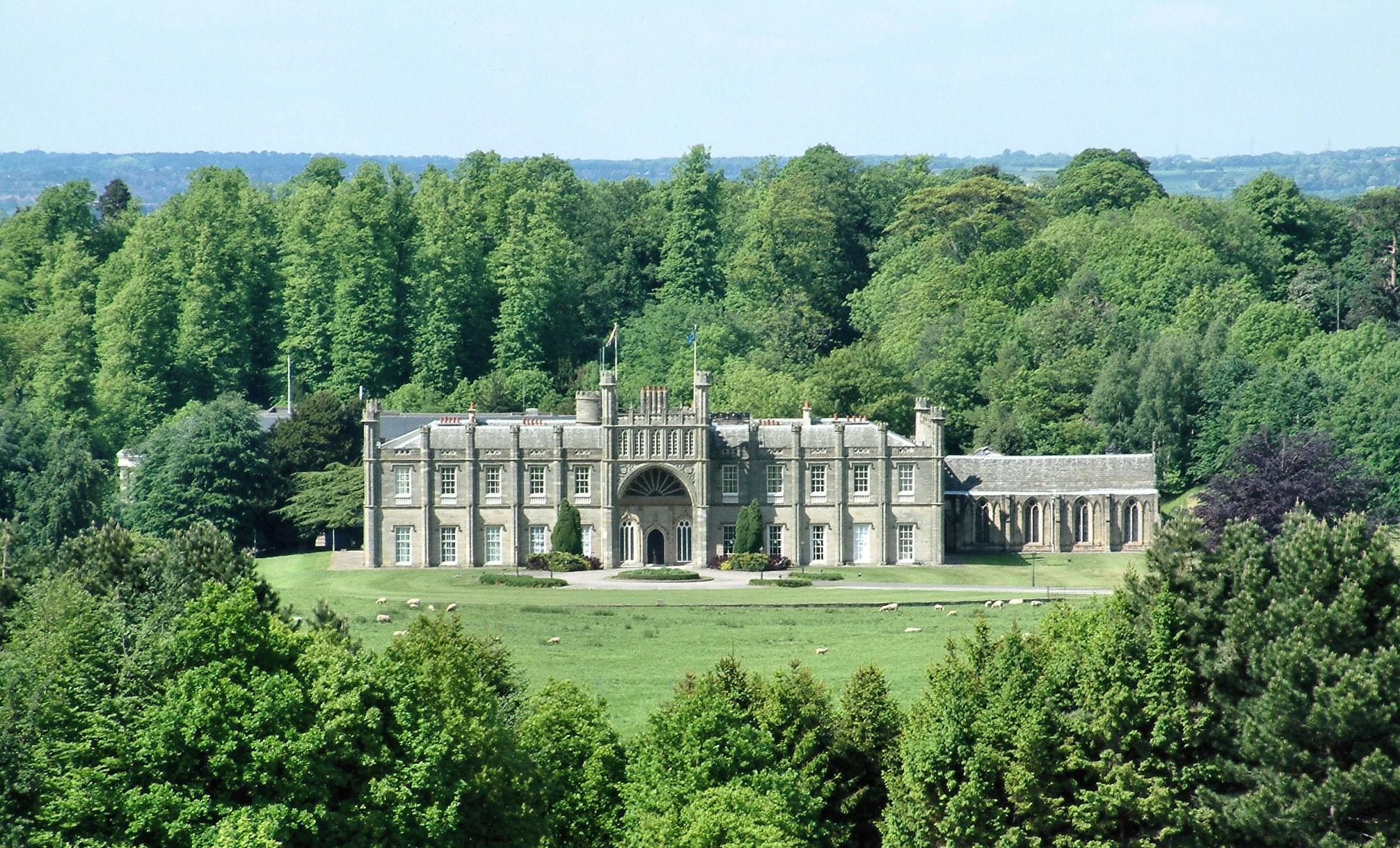
Donington Hall in 2008

Stuart James Garner (born November 1968) is a British businessman and convicted fraudster. He was the owner and CEO of the Norton Motorcycle Company from 2008 until it went into administration in 2020.

== Early life ==
Garner was born in Derbyshire in November 1968.

== Career ==
He is a former gamekeeper, share trader and firework seller.

He acquired the Norton Motorcycle Company in 2008.

In 2013, he bought the 1790 Gothic Donington Hall and its 26-acre Donington estate from BMI Airlines, and it became the Norton head office, as well as his family home.

Between 2012 and 2013, £11.5m was transferred from three Norton Pension schemes that Stuart Garner was the sole trustee. The money was "spent paying the people behind the liberation scam, buying cryptocurrencies and making cash withdrawals". In June 2020, the Pension Ombudsman ruled that as a pension scheme trustee, Garner had "acted dishonestly and in breach of his duty".

In December 2020, he was refused permission to appeal against the Pension Ombudsman's ruling that he must pay back £14 million missing from the Norton pension fund. Garner has also had a personal bankruptcy petition filed against him by Leicester City Council. In March 2022 Garner was sentenced to a custodial sentence of eight months, suspended for 2 years, and disqualified as a Director for three years.

== Personal life ==
In 2016, he bought the Priest House Hotel, adjacent to the Donington Hall estate, on the banks of the River Trent.

Garner married Susie Lodge in summer 2018, and has three children from a previous marriage.
