= Brutus (car) =

One-off vintage racecar

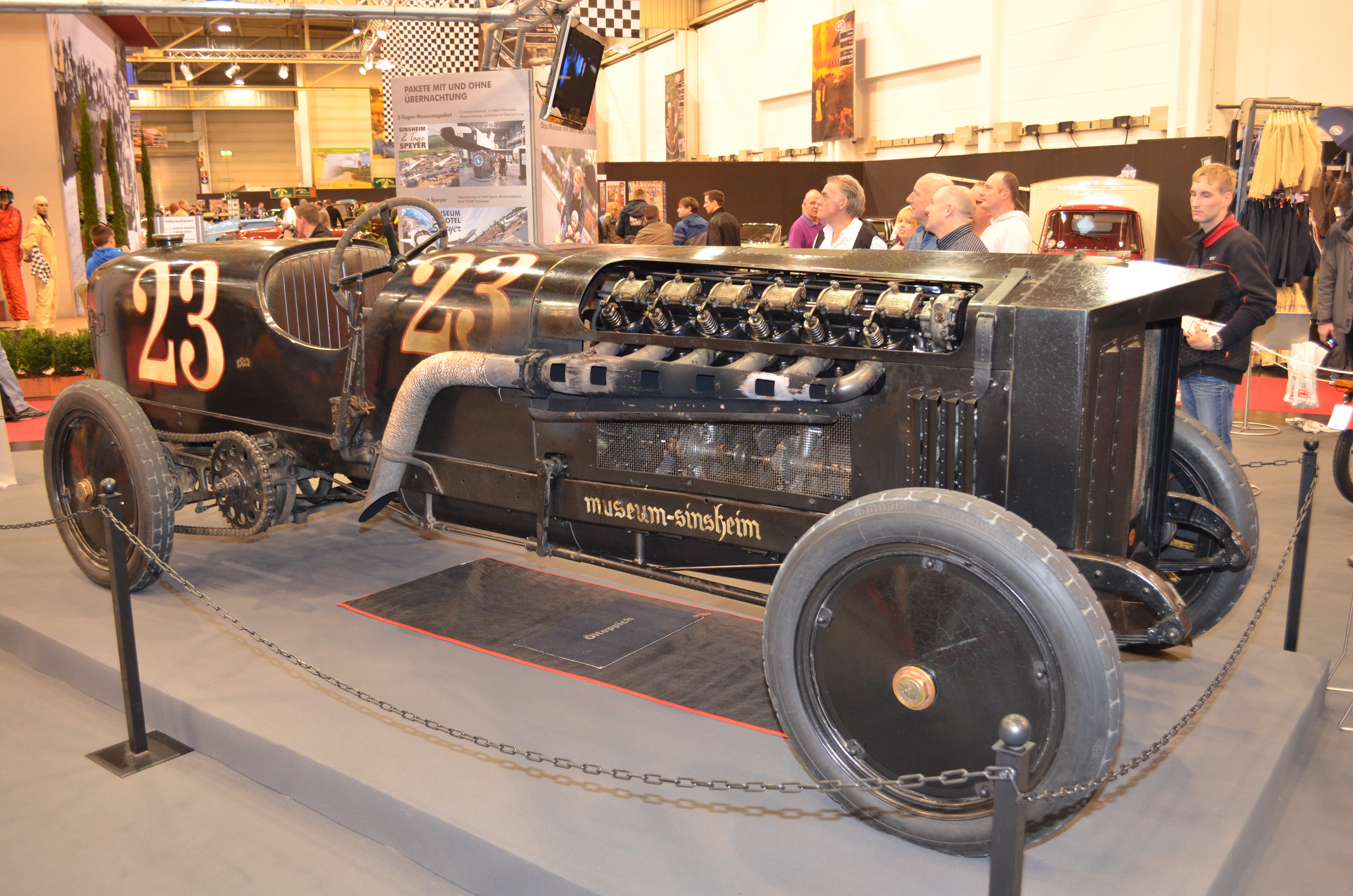

Overview
- Also called: Brutus BMW
- Production: 2006
- Assembly: Sinsheim Auto & Technik Museum

Body and chassis
- Class: Custom car
- Body style: Open Wheeler
- Layout: FR layout
- Platform: 1907/1908 American LaFrance
- Related: Heinkel He 111; Napier-Bentley; Napier-Railton; Packard-Bentley; The Beast; Meteor

Powertrain
- Engine: 46,899.9 cc (2,862.01 cu in) BMW VI V12
- Power output: 490–550 bhp (500–560 PS; 370–410 kW) @ 1,530 rpm (standard); 750 bhp (760 PS; 560 kW) @ 1,700 rpm (temporarily); 3,730 N⋅m (2,750 lb⋅ft) @ 1,000 rpm (standard); 4,672 N⋅m (3,446 lb⋅ft) @ 800 rpm (temporarily)
- Transmission: 3-speed chain drive

Dimensions
- Wheelbase: 4,500 mm (178 in)
- Length: 5,370 mm (211.6 in)
- Width: 1,611 mm (63.4 in)
- Height: 1,420 mm (56 in)
- Kerb weight: 2,537 kg (5,593 lb)

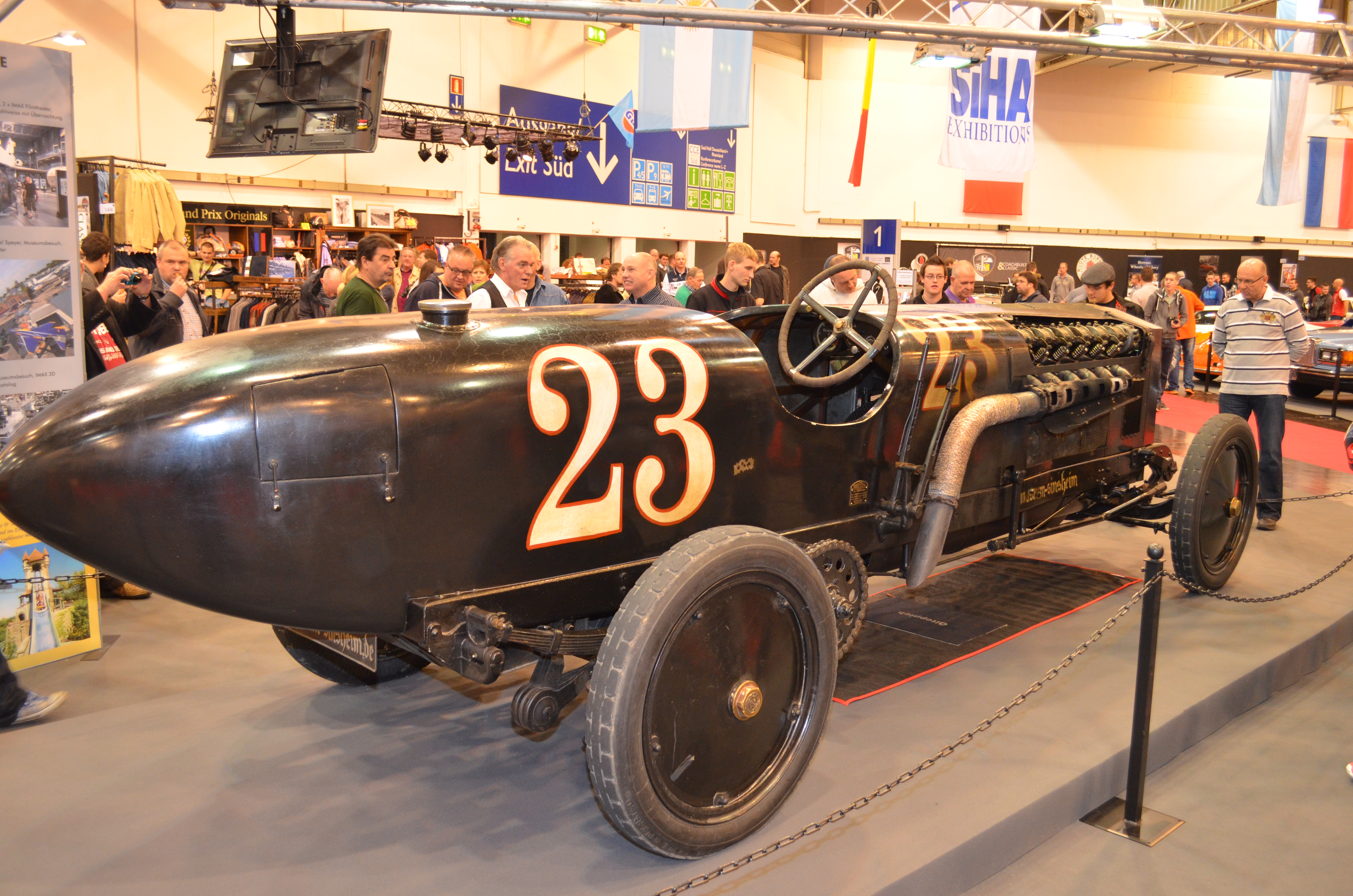
The rear of the car

Brutus is an aero-engined car. It is powered by a water-cooled 46.9-litre (2,862 cu in) BMW V12 aircraft engine, which produces between 490–550 hp (370–410 kW) @ 1530 rpm, but can produce a maximum of 750 hp (560 kW) @ 1700 rpm for shorts bursts of one minute, and is mated to a 1907/1908 American LaFrance chassis.

== Background ==
Brutus made an appearance on the British television program Top Gear on 4 March 2012, during the sixth episode of Season 18. The Brutus was built in Germany in 2006, when a 1908 American LaFrance fire engine's chassis was fitted with a 46.9-liter (2,862 cu in) V12 BMW aircraft engine that dates to 1925. The car was created over several years at a workshop at the Auto & Technik Museum in Sinsheim, Germany, which still owns it. According to the Museum, the Brutus can produce 500 hp (370 kW) at 1,500 rpm, while its fuel efficiency averages 1 L/km (2.8 mpg_{‑imp}). Driving the car on Top Gear, presenter Jeremy Clarkson described the experience as akin to "doing a crossword while being eaten by a tiger".
