= Aero-engined car =

Car powered by an aircraft engine

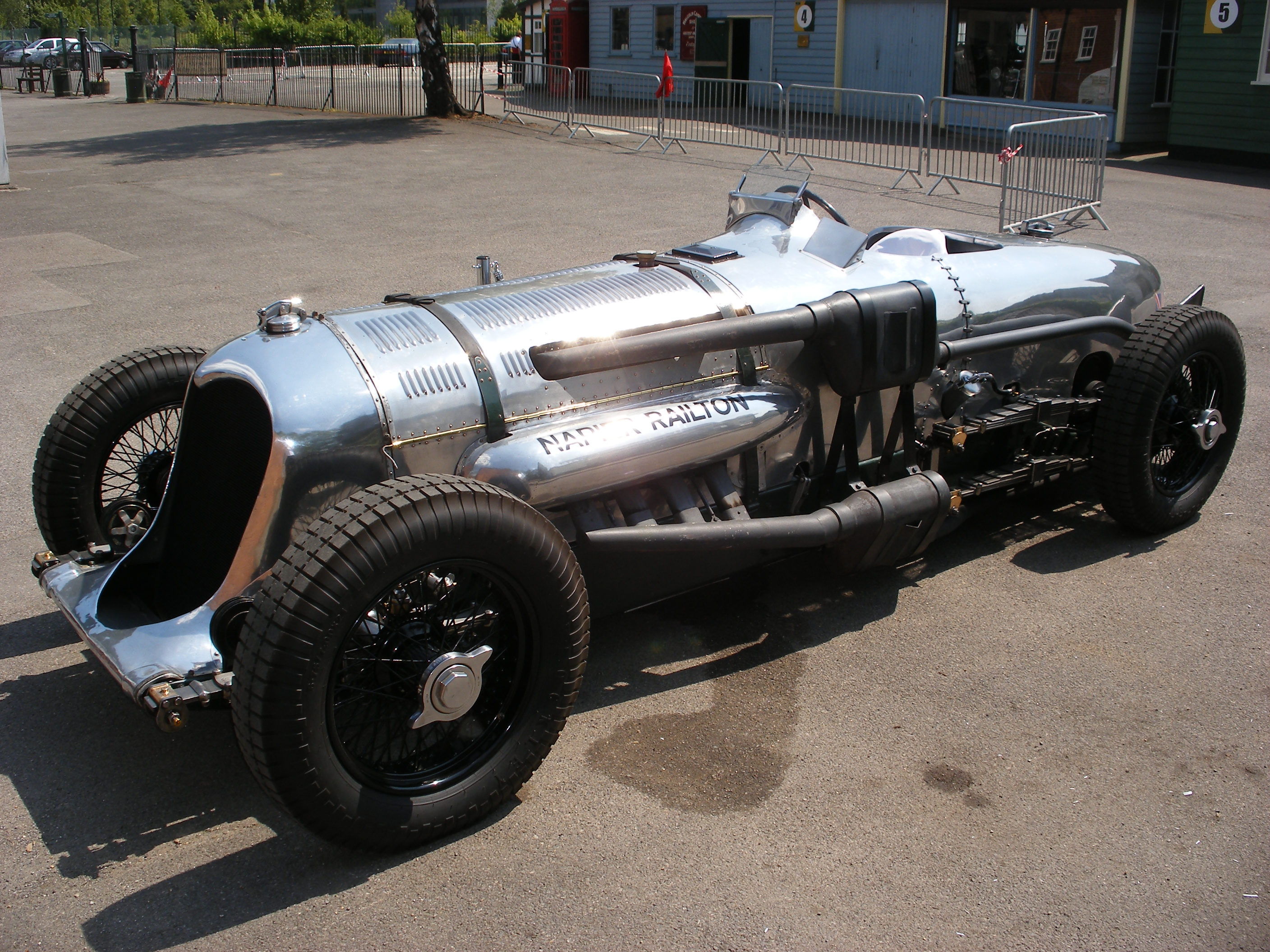
The Napier-Railton, built in 1933 and powered by a Napier Lion aircraft engine, at Brooklands Museum in 2008

An aero-engined car is an automobile powered by an engine designed for aircraft use. Most such cars have been built for racing, and many have attempted to set world land speed records. While the practice of fitting cars with aircraft engines predates World War I by a few years, it was most popular in the interwar period between the world wars when military-surplus aircraft engines were readily available and used to power numerous high-performance racing cars. Initially powered by piston aircraft engines, a number of post-World War II aero-engined cars have been powered by aviation turbine and jet engines instead. Piston-engined, turbine-engined, and jet-engined cars have all set world land speed records. There have also been some non-racing automotive applications for aircraft engines, including production vehicles such as the Tucker 48 and prototypes such as the Chrysler Turbine Car, Fiat Turbina, and General Motors Firebirds. In the late 20th century and into the 21st century, there has also been a revival of interest in piston-powered aero-engined racing cars.

== Background ==
In the early 20th century, automotive engines were fairly limited in terms of revolutions per minute (rpm), with 3,000 rpm constituting an upper limit. This meant that the easiest way to increase the power output of an engine was to increase its displacement. In the decade of the 1900s, engine construction necessitated extremely large displacements in order to simply reach the 100 horsepower (75 kW) mark. Furthermore, while it was difficult to fit such a large engine into a car, it was very much possible, and the fact that most of the aircraft engines of the period were liquid-cooled made them more adaptable for automotive use.

== Racing ==
=== Pre-World War I ===
A number of early European automobile manufacturers experimented with the automotive use of aircraft engines, including Hispano-Suiza, Renault, and Rolls-Royce, although it was Fiat that made perhaps the first true aero-engined car when it created the Tipo S76 in 1910. Nicknamed "The Beast of Turin", the vehicle consisted of a 1907–08 Fiat production chassis mated to a four-cylinder Tipo S76DA airship engine that had a displacement of 28.4 liters (1,730 cu in) and developed 300 hp (220 kW) at 1,500 rpm. Daryl Murphy speculates that the car was built to capture the world land speed record, which at the time stood at 125.95 mph (202.70 km/h) after the Blitzen Benz had established the mark at the English track Brooklands in 1909. While the Tipo S76 did race at Brooklands, it never exceeded more than about 90 mph (140 km/h). It later returned to continental Europe and ultimately disappeared during World War I.

Sunbeam also manufactured aircraft engines before World War I, and at the suggestion of chief designer Louis Coatalen it decided to install one of its nine-liter (550 cu in) flathead V12 engines (which would later be developed into the Sunbeam Mohawk) into an automobile chassis in 1913. Nicknamed "Toodles", the car achieved 114.49 mph (184.25 km/h) at Brooklands before it was shipped to the United States, where it was raced by Ralph DePalma. DePalma later sold Toodles to the Packard Motor Car Company, which used the car's engine as the inspiration for its seven-liter (430 cu in) Twin Six, which became the world's first production 12-cylinder engine in 1916, as well as a 250 hp (190 kW), 14.8-liter (900 cu in) V12 aircraft engine in 1917.

Sunbeam also developed a second aero-engined car before World War I, which began life as an Indianapolis 500 racing car before Warwick Wright augmented it with a V8 Sunbeam Sirdar airship engine. The car developed 200 brake horsepower (150 kW) at 2,200 rpm, which enabled it to achieve a top speed of approximately 100 mph (160 km/h). By 1923, this Sunbeam was listed for sale for £1,000.

=== Interwar period ===
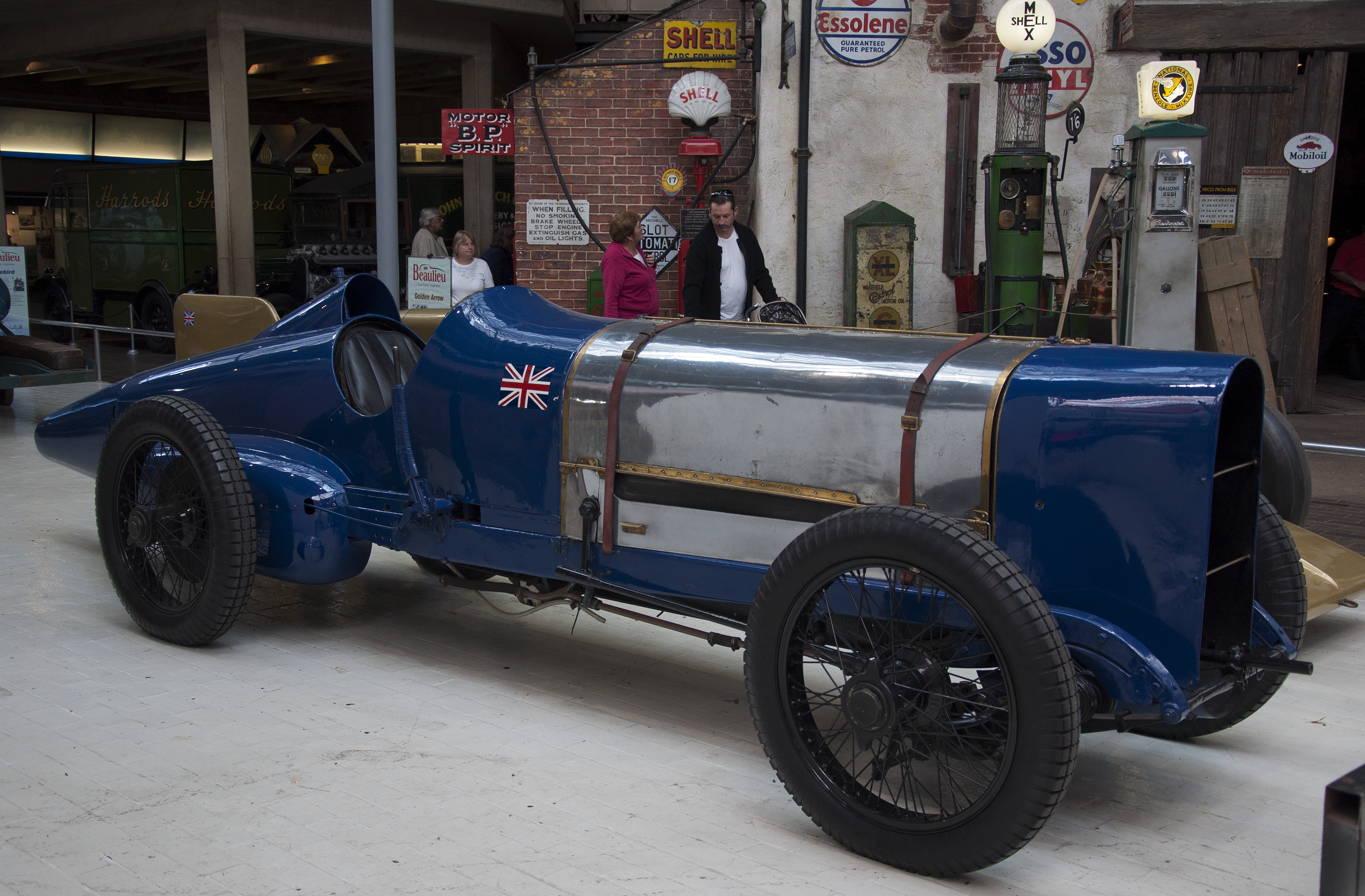
The Sunbeam 350HP at the National Motor Museum, Beaulieu in 2011

==== 1920s ====
By the 1920s, after the end of World War I, interest in and development of aero-engined cars reached a new level. Coatalen built another aero-engined racing car, the Sunbeam 350HP, which featured a Sunbeam Manitou engine that had been designed to power Royal Naval Air Service flying boats. With an engine displacement of 1,118 cubic inches (18.32 L) and the ability to generate 355 hp (265 kW) at 2,100 rpm, the 350HP achieved a top speed of 134 mph (216 km/h) in 1922.

In 1923, Ernest Eldridge began building the Mefistofele, which consisted of a Fiat SB4 chassis and a 21.7-liter (1,320 cu in) Fiat A.12 bis aircraft engine that produced 320 hp (240 kW) at 1,800 rpm. On 12 July 1924, Eldridge drove the car to a world-record speed of 234.980 km/h (146.010 mph) on public roads in Arpajon, France, which marked the last time that a land speed record would be set on public roads. The car's name was bestowed upon it by the press due to the tremendous amount of noise and smoke generated by its engine.

Argentine racer Adolfo Scandroglio built his Fiat Botafogo Special in the image of the Mefistofele, using a 1917 Fiat chassis and the same 21.7-liter (1,320 cu in) Fiat A.12 engine that had been chosen by Eldridge. The car, which was named after a famed racehorse, was capable of producing 320 hp (240 kW) at 1,800 rpm. In 1949, Scandroglio was killed while racing the Botafogo Special, and the car was presumed to have been lost before its engine was rediscovered in the 1990s. After its rediscovery, the Argentine company Pur Sang, which is noted for creating exact replicas of Alfa Romeo 8C 2300s and Bugatti Type 35s, reconstructed the Botafogo Special. In 2011, the rebuilt car was purchased from Pur Sang by Jay Leno.

In 1923, the Sunbeam 350HP was purchased by Malcolm Campbell, who made modifications to the coachwork as well as the engine in his endeavor to increase its speed. He also renamed the car Blue Bird, and on 25 September 1924 used it to set the official world land speed record with a speed of 146.16 mph (235.22 km/h) at Pendine Sands in Wales. The next year, on 21 July 1925, Campbell returned to Pendine, where he became the first person to exceed 150 mph (240 km/h) as he set a new record of 150.766 mph (242.634 km/h).

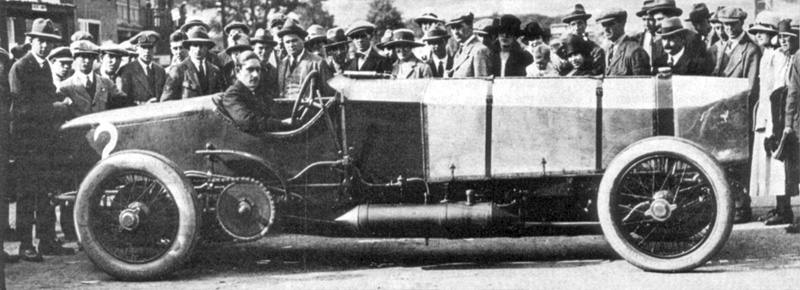
Louis Zborowski with Chitty Bang Bang 1 at Brooklands, circa 1921

Perhaps the most well-known aero-engined cars of the interwar period were the series of amateur, chain-driven creations of Louis Zborowski that were each known as Chitty Bang Bang. They later attained fame as the namesake for the children's book Chitty-Chitty-Bang-Bang, written by Ian Fleming, as well as the film and musical of the same title. Although the origin of the name is unknown, it is thought to derive from either a lewd World War I soldier's song or simply the sound of the aircraft engines that powered the cars. The first car, Chitty 1, featured a customized pre-war Mercedes chassis and a 23-liter (1,400 cu in), six-cylinder Maybach airplane engine that had powered a Gotha G.V bomber before it was surrendered by Germany as a war reparation. The engine could produce 300 hp (220 kW) at a relatively modest 1,500 rpm. Chitty 1 achieved celebrity status at Brooklands in 1921, where it won races at speeds in excess of 100 mph (160 km/h). In 1922, Zborowski returned to Brooklands to achieve his highest ever speed in the car, 113.45 mph (182.58 km/h), although that autumn Chitty 1 was destroyed in a racing accident.

Zborowski began working on a second car of the same name, Chitty 2, in 1921. While its use of an older model Mercedes for its chassis made it similar to its predecessor, this iteration of Chitty Bang Bang was powered by an 18.8-liter (1,150 cu in) Benz Bz.IV engine that manufactured 230 hp (170 kW). Chitty 2 placed second in its only race at Brooklands, although it did record a speed of over 108 mph (174 km/h). In 1922, Zborowski and his wife took the car on a lengthy excursion across France and Algeria, all the way to the edge of the Sahara, where a dearth of sufficient radiator water caused such substantial engine damage that he was forced to retire the car from racing. Zborowski himself was killed at Monza while competing in the 1924 Italian Grand Prix, and Chitty 2 passed through a series of owners (including Arthur Conan Doyle) before being acquired by the Crawford Auto-Aviation Collection in Cleveland.

The third of Zborowski's cars, Chitty 3, was also built around a modified Mercedes chassis, this time mated to a six-cylinder Mercedes aircraft engine originally rated at 160 hp (120 kW) that had been tuned to develop 180 hp (130 kW). Once again, this car raced at Brooklands, where it achieved a top speed of 112.68 mph (181.34 km/h).

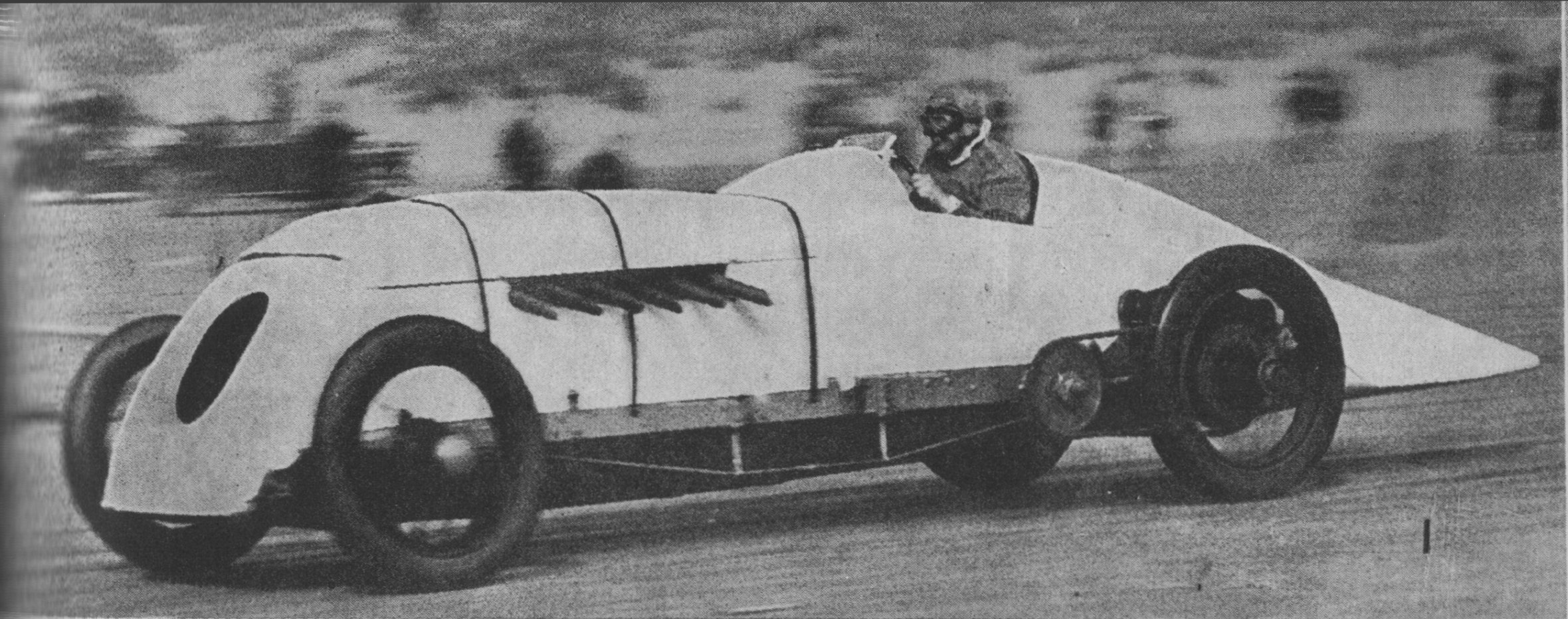
J. G. Parry-Thomas racing Babs at Pendine in 1926

Zborowski's fourth and final aero-engined car was the Higham Special, which he named in a nod to his manor, the Higham House. Created in 1924 for the purpose of making an attempt on the land speed record, the car was powered by a World War I V12 Liberty L-12 engine with a displacement of 27 liters (1,648 cu in), which made it the largest-capacity engine to ever race at Brooklands. With an engine producing 450 hp (340 kW) and the gearbox and chain-drive of a pre-war Blitzen Benz, the Higham Special achieved a speed of 116 mph (187 km/h) with Zborowski at the wheel. After Zborowski's death at Monza, racing enthusiast J. G. Parry-Thomas bought the car and, after streamlining the body and modifying the engine, rechristened it "Babs". In 1926, Parry-Thomas took the car back to Brooklands, where he set a new world record with a speed of 129 mph (208 km/h). He then took Babs to Pendine, where he achieved 169 mph (272 km/h) on the sands. After Malcolm Campbell took back the record with a 174 mph (280 km/h) run in his Blue Bird, Parry-Thomas returned to Pendine in 1927 with a more streamlined Babs. However, on his first run, he was killed in a crash. Parry-Thomas' crew buried Babs in the sand, where it remained until Owen Wyn Owen began excavating it in 1969. Wyn Owen ultimately restored the car to working order by 1985. In 2013, Babs was placed on display at the National Waterfront Museum in Swansea.

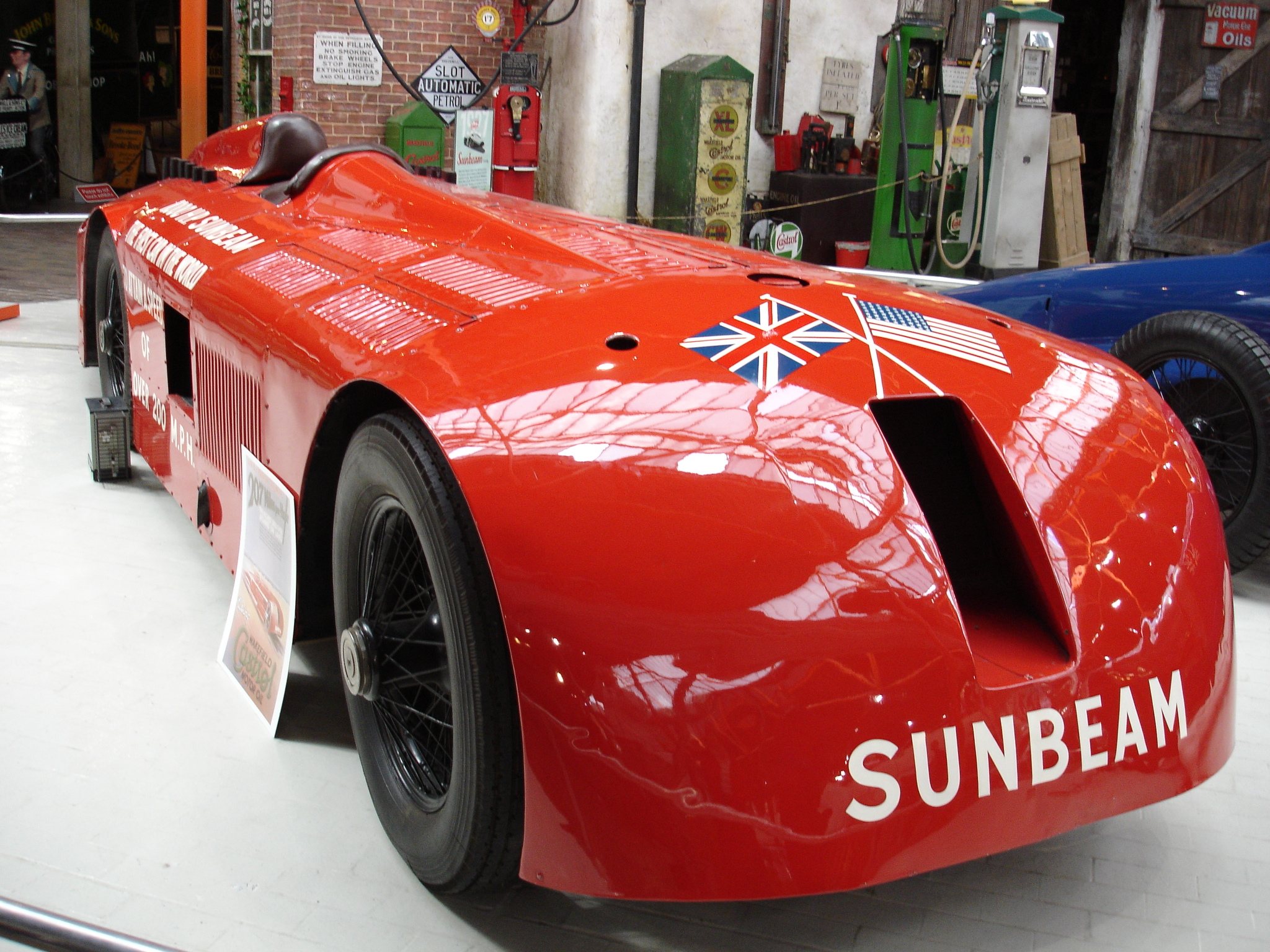
The Sunbeam 1000 hp at the National Motor Museum, Beaulieu in 2006

In 1927, Henry Segrave broke Campbell's world speed record with a run of 202.98 mph (326.66 km/h) at Daytona Beach, Florida, in his Sunbeam 1000 hp, which was powered by two V12 Sunbeam Matabele aircraft engines. The new record made him the first person to surpass the 200 mph (320 km/h) mark. The following year, Campbell raced at Daytona to retake the record with a speed of 206.95 mph (333.05 km/h), only to have it eclipsed just two months later by Ray Keech and his Triplex Special, which was powered by three V12 Liberty engines. On 11 March 1929, Segrave captured the world record once more at Daytona with a speed of 231.446 mph (372.476 km/h) in his Golden Arrow, which was powered by a W12 Napier Lion aircraft engine with a displacement of 23,944 cubic centimetres (1,461.2 cu in) that manufactured 925 bhp (690 kW) at 3,300 rpm. The very next day, while attempting to re-take the record with the Triplex Special, driver Lee Bible lost his life in a fatal crash that also killed a film cameraman.

==== 1930s ====
In 1931, Campbell returned to competition with an upgraded Blue Bird that was sleeker and lower than its predecessor. Fitted with a 1,450 hp (1,080 kW) Napier Lion engine, the car successfully set a new land speed record with a run of 246.09 mph (396.04 km/h). By 1933, Campbell had created another Blue Bird that was powered by a Rolls-Royce R, which had achieved fame as the engine that helped the Supermarine S.6B seaplane win the Schneider Trophy. With this engine, which produced 2,500 hp (1,900 kW) and had a displacement of 36.7 liters (2,240 cu in), Blue Bird achieved a speed in excess of 272 mph (438 km/h) at Daytona. However, as performance continued to increase, the relatively limited area of Daytona Beach began to prevent cars from reaching their true top speeds. In September 1935, Campbell took Blue Bird to Utah's Bonneville Salt Flats, where it exceeded 300 mph (480 km/h).

Ab Jenkins, who in October 1935 had set speed records for one hour and for 24 hours in a factory-modified Duesenberg SJ on a 10 miles (16 km) circuit marked out in the Bonneville Salt Flats, realized that it was no longer possible for a modified production car to compete against aero-engined cars for long-distance speed records. Jenkins had his SJ special further modified, replacing the modified SJ engine with a 25.73 liters (1,570 cu in) Curtiss Conqueror engine. The Conqueror-engined special was named "Mormon Meteor" by a contest held by the Deseret News. In 1936 the Mormon Meteor set the 500-kilometer (310 mi) record at 164.47 mph (264.69 km/h) (breaking a record set by George Eyston), the 24‑hour record at 153.82 mph (247.55 km/h), and the 48‑hour record at 148.64 mph (239.21 km/h). The Mormon Meteor set another 24‑hour record in 1937, averaging 157.27 mph (253.10 km/h). Jenkins then commissioned August Duesenberg to build a chassis that was better able to handle the weight, power, and torque of the Conqueror engine. The result was the Mormon Meteor III, which broke the 12‑hour record in 1939 and set a 24‑hour record of 161.18 mph (259.39 km/h) in 1940.

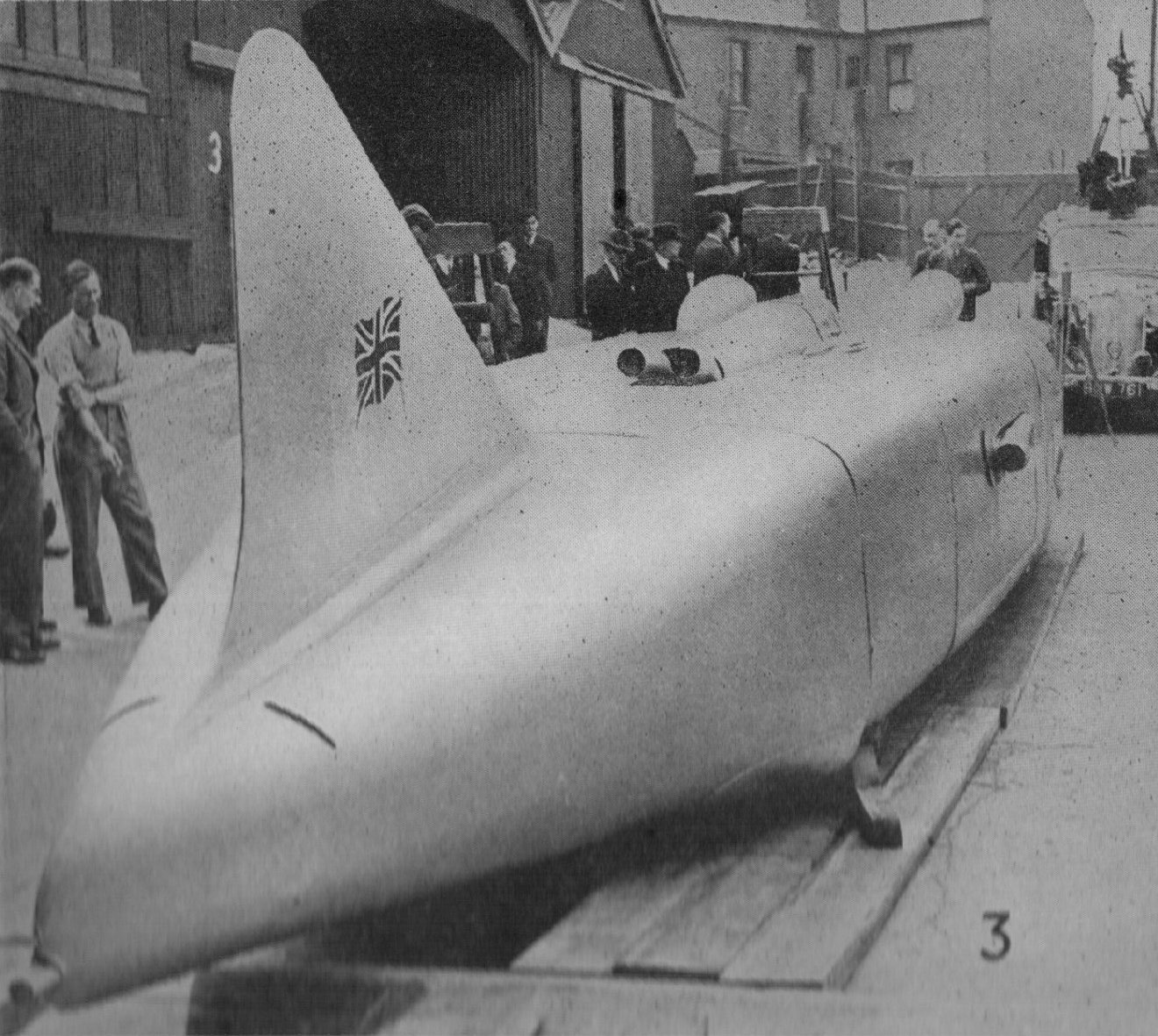
The Thunderbolt in 1938

In 1937, Eyston brought his Thunderbolt to Bonneville, where its twin Rolls-Royce R engines powered it to a world-record speed of 312 mph (502 km/h). That year on the salt flats, something of a rivalry developed between Eyston and John Cobb, who had previously raced the 23.94-liter (1,461 cu in) Napier-Railton at Brooklands as well as at Bonneville. For 1937, Cobb had built the teardrop-shaped, streamlined Railton Special, which featured four-wheel drive and two Napier Lion engines. Over the span of just a few weeks, Eyston and his Thunderbolt set a new record of 345.49 mph (556.01 km/h), which Cobb and his Railton Special answered with a run of just over 350 mph (560 km/h), before Eyston retook the title by achieving 357.5 mph (575.3 km/h). The following year, 1938, Cobb returned to Bonneville and set a new world record of 369.7 mph (595.0 km/h), which would stand until 1947 due in part to the hiatus of competition caused by the outbreak of World War II.

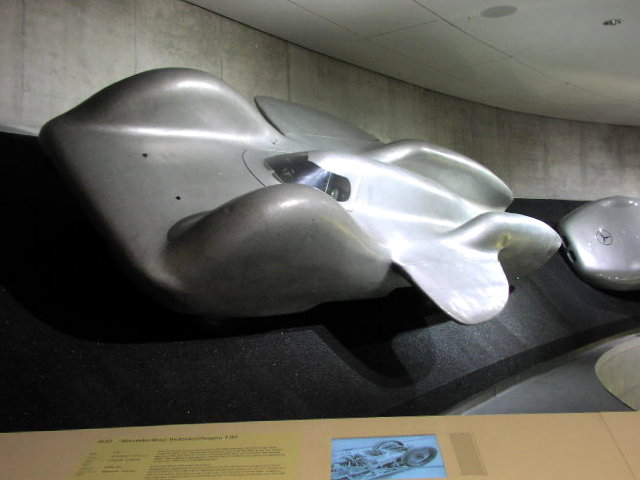
The Mercedes-Benz T80 at the Mercedes-Benz Museum in Stuttgart in 2006

By 1939, the Mercedes-Benz T80 emerged as the result of a three-year collaboration between German auto racer Hans Stuck, Mercedes-Benz, and Adolf Hitler, the latter of whom had a strong interest in motorsport and was committed to subsidizing German racing endeavors in an effort to showcase his country's technological superiority on the world stage. Costing an astounding 600,000 Reichsmarks, the six-wheeled, streamlined T80 was largely designed and developed by Ferdinand Porsche. The T80 was powered by the Daimler-Benz DB 603, an inverted V12 aviation engine that boasted a displacement of 44.5-liter (2,716 cu in) and was capable of producing 2,200 kW (3,000 hp), which had been derived from the Daimler-Benz DB 601 that powered the Messerschmitt Bf 109 fighter aircraft. The T80's engine ran on a fuel mixture that consisted mostly of methyl alcohol (63%), as well as smaller percentages of benzene, ethanol, acetone, nitrobenzene, avgas, and ether. After initially being set at 550 km/h (340 mph), the car's targeted top speed was ultimately increased to 750 km/h (470 mph) by late 1939. A world speed record attempt was planned for January 1940 on the 10-kilometer (6.2 mi) Dessauer Rennstrecke segment of the Reichsautobahn Berlin-Halle/Leipzig, with Stuck at the controls, although the outbreak of World War II prevented the run from ever happening. After surviving the war in storage in Carinthia, Austria, the T80 was ultimately acquired by the Mercedes-Benz Museum in Stuttgart.

=== Post-World War II ===
==== Piston-engined cars ====
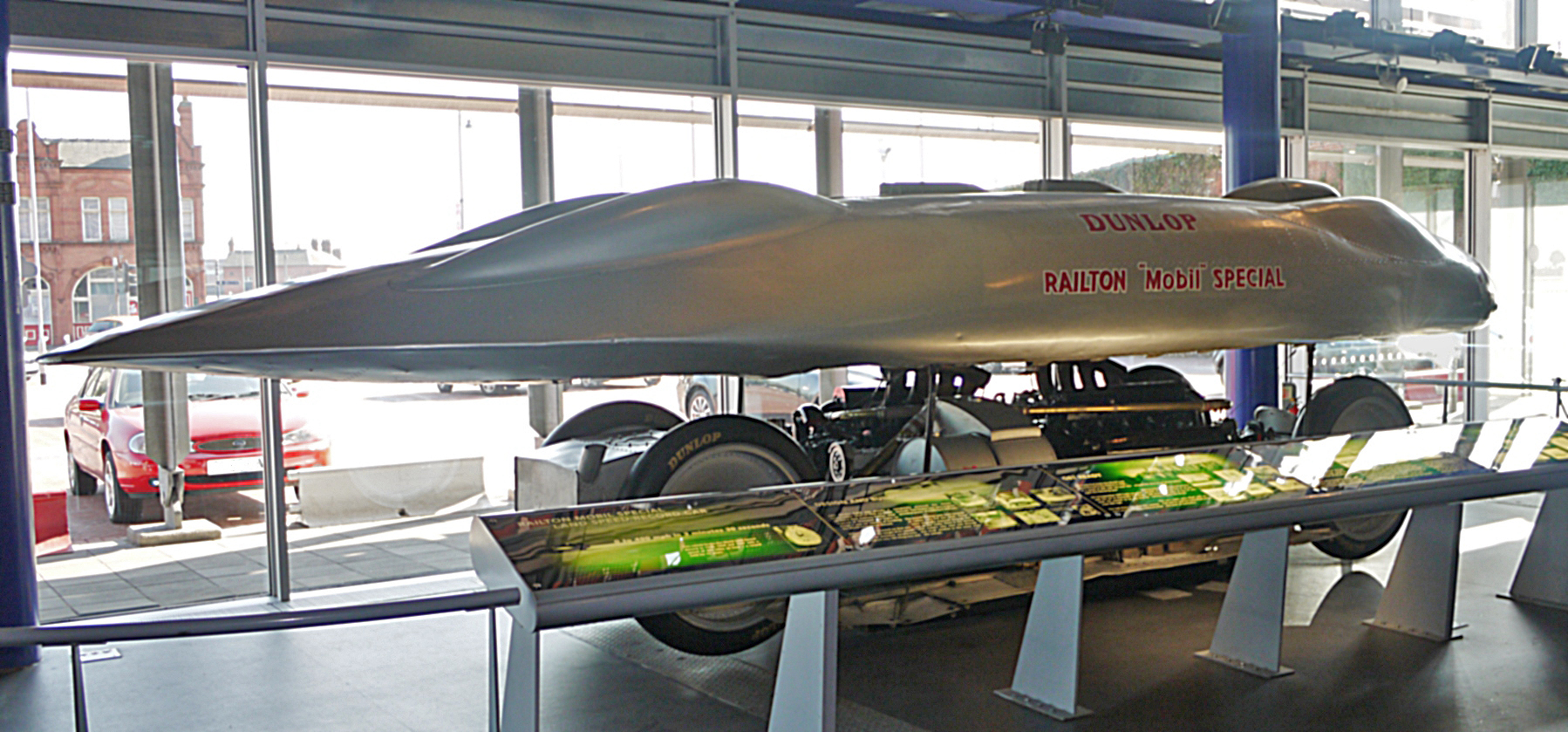
The Railton Mobil Special at Thinktank, Birmingham in 2011

After the conclusion of World War II, John Cobb returned to Utah in 1947, where he improved upon his own world record by achieving an official speed of 394.196 mph (634.397 km/h) in his rebuilt Railton Mobil Special. On one of the requisite two-way runs, Cobb exceeded 400 mph (640 km/h). Cobb's record would stand for 16 years, and would mark the last time that a piston-engined car would hold the world land speed record.

In 1951, hot rod and drag racing enthusiast Art Arfons began building a series of aero-engined racing cars each known as the Green Monster. The first was a two-ton Ford truck chassis mated to an Allison V-1710 piston engine that was altogether capable of a record 144 mph (232 km/h) in a quarter-mile drag race. Arfons went on to build 12 more piston-engined Green Monsters before he began experimenting with jet engines.

==== Turbine-engined cars ====
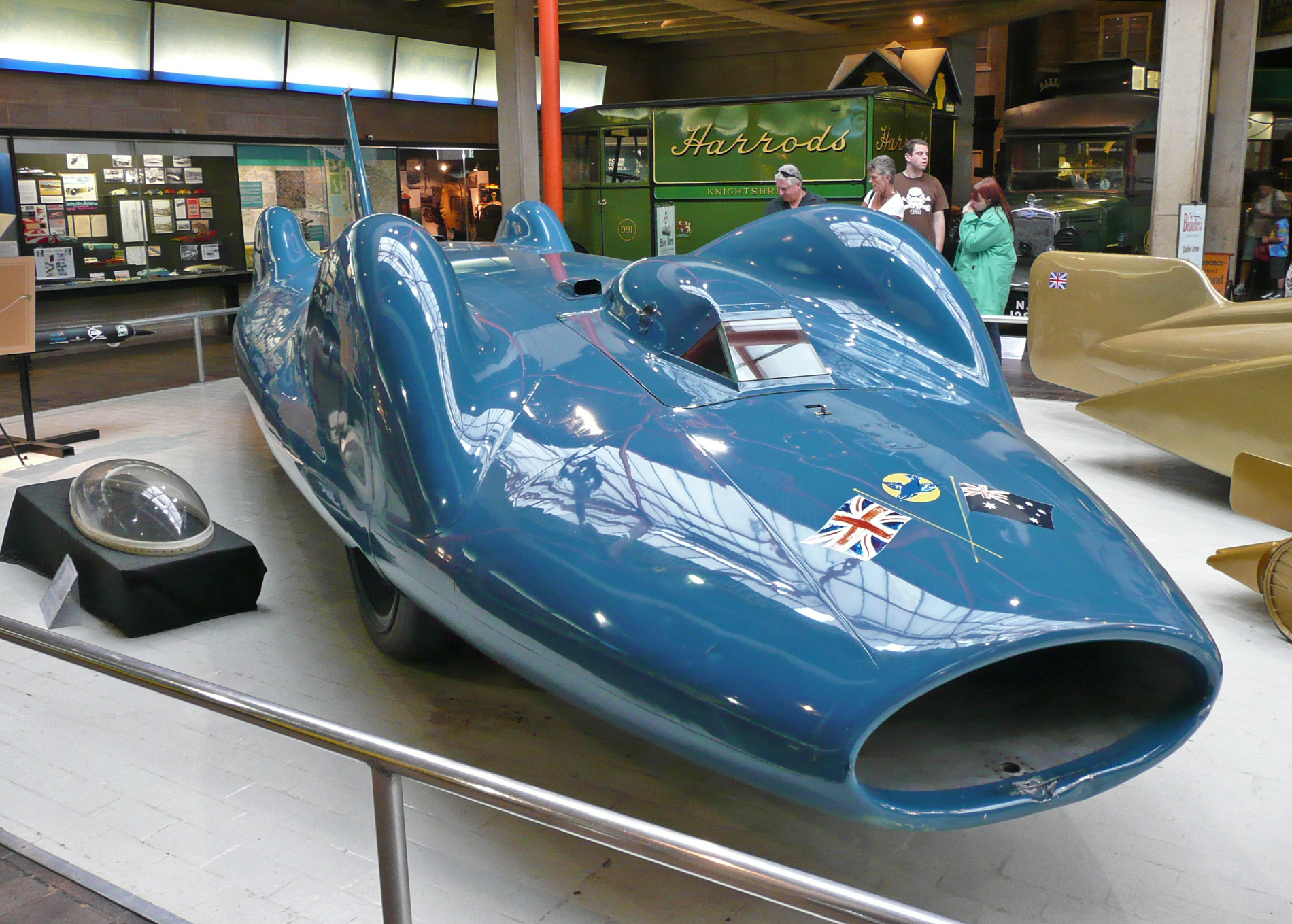
The Bluebird-Proteus CN7 at the National Motor Museum, Beaulieu in 2008

First raced in 1960, the Bluebird-Proteus CN7 was built at a cost of £1 million and powered by a Bristol-Siddeley Proteus turboshaft gas turbine engine. The engine, which was rated at 4,100 hp (3,100 kW), drove all four wheels. After a serious crash at Bonneville, a tail fin was added to the original design before the Bluebird-Proteus CN7 made another run at the world record at Lake Eyre, South Australia. There, on 17 July 1964, Donald Campbell piloted the car to a new world record speed of 403.10 mph (648.73 km/h).

A number of other turbine-engined racing cars have been built, including two designed to compete for the world land speed record: Pioneer 2M and the Renault Étoile Filante. Turbine-engined cars have also raced in other types of motorsports, including both open-wheel racing (Lotus 56 and STP-Paxton Turbocar) as well as sports car racing (Howmet TX and Rover-BRM).

==== Jet-engined cars ====
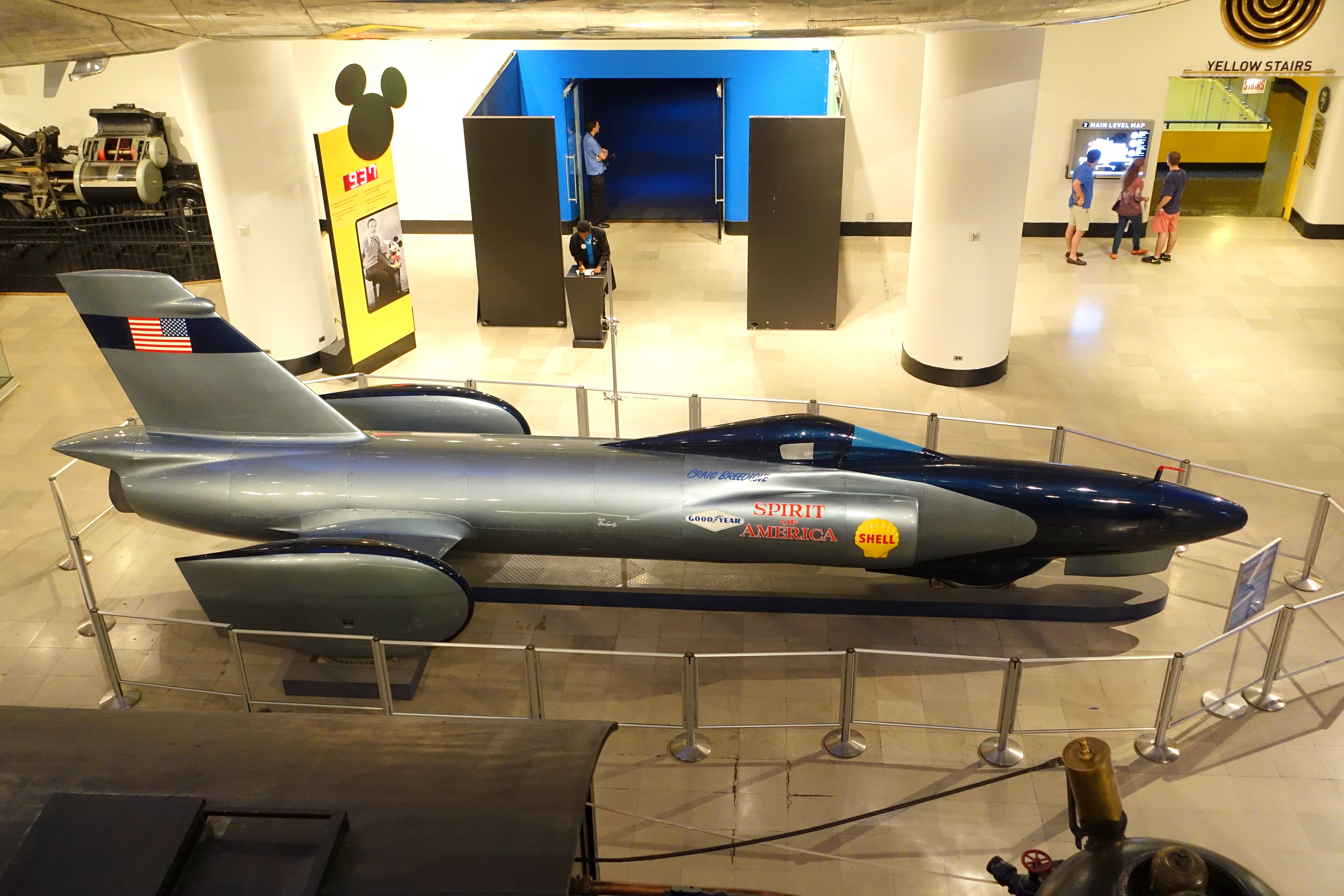
The Spirit of America at the Museum of Science and Industry, Chicago in 2014

In 1952, Soviet aircraft designer Aleksey Smolin developed the GAZ-TR, which was powered by a turbojet. Built in 1954, it was designed to reach 500 km/h (310 mph), but due to the lack of adequate tires and an insufficiently long track it failed to exceed 300 km/h (190 mph) during a test run on November 14, 1954. The GAZ-TR crashed during testing, injuring driver MA Meteleva and leading to the cancellation of the program. Wreckage from the car is on display at the GAZ factory museum.

In 1962, jet engines made their first appearances at Bonneville in three different cars that were each based around the General Electric J47 engine, which also powered the North American F-86 Sabre jet fighter. One of the cars was the Flying Caduceus, which was driven to a speed of 331 mph (533 km/h) by Nathan Ostich, a physician who built the first jet car. The second was piloted by Glenn Leasher, who approached the 400 mph (640 km/h) mark before he was killed in a crash. The third was the needle-nosed Spirit of America, designed and raced by drag racer Craig Breedlove. Breedlove also contended for the speed record that year, although he did not capture the title until he recorded a speed of 407 mph (655 km/h) in 1963.

In 1964, brothers Art and Walt Arfons arrived at Bonneville with jet cars of their own. Walt had acquired a Westinghouse J46 jet engine, which had been designed for the Vought F7U Cutlass, that he used to power his Wingfoot Express. Art had opted for a General Electric J79, the same engine that powered the Lockheed F-104 Starfighter and the Convair B-58 Hustler bomber, and built a new, jet-powered Green Monster. After Walt Arfons crashed and suffered a heart attack while testing the Wingfoot Express, designer Tom Green was selected to drive the car. Despite never having driven over 130 mph (210 km/h) before, on 2 October 1964 he piloted the car to a world-record speed of 413 mph (665 km/h). The record stood for just three days, however, before it was broken by Art Arfons and his Green Monster with a speed of 434 mph (698 km/h). Just one week after the Green Monster's record run, Breedlove broke the 500 mph (800 km/h) barrier before surviving a high-speed crash. The 1964 season ended with Art Arfons retaking the speed title when he made a run at 536 mph (863 km/h) after making modifications to his engine.

In 1965, Breedlove returned to the Bonneville Salt Flats with his new Spirit of America - Sonic I, which was powered by a GE J79 engine. Challenged by Walt Arfons and his modified, JATO-assisted Wingfoot Express, Breedlove recorded a speed of 555 mph (893 km/h) in his new car. While Walt was unable to match Breedlove's speed, his brother Art surpassed it just a week later with a run of 576 mph (927 km/h), despite shredding a tire in the process. Ultimately it was Breedlove, immortalized by the Beach Boys in the song "Spirit of America", who emerged victorious as he posted a speed of 600.601 mph (966.574 km/h) on 15 November 1965.

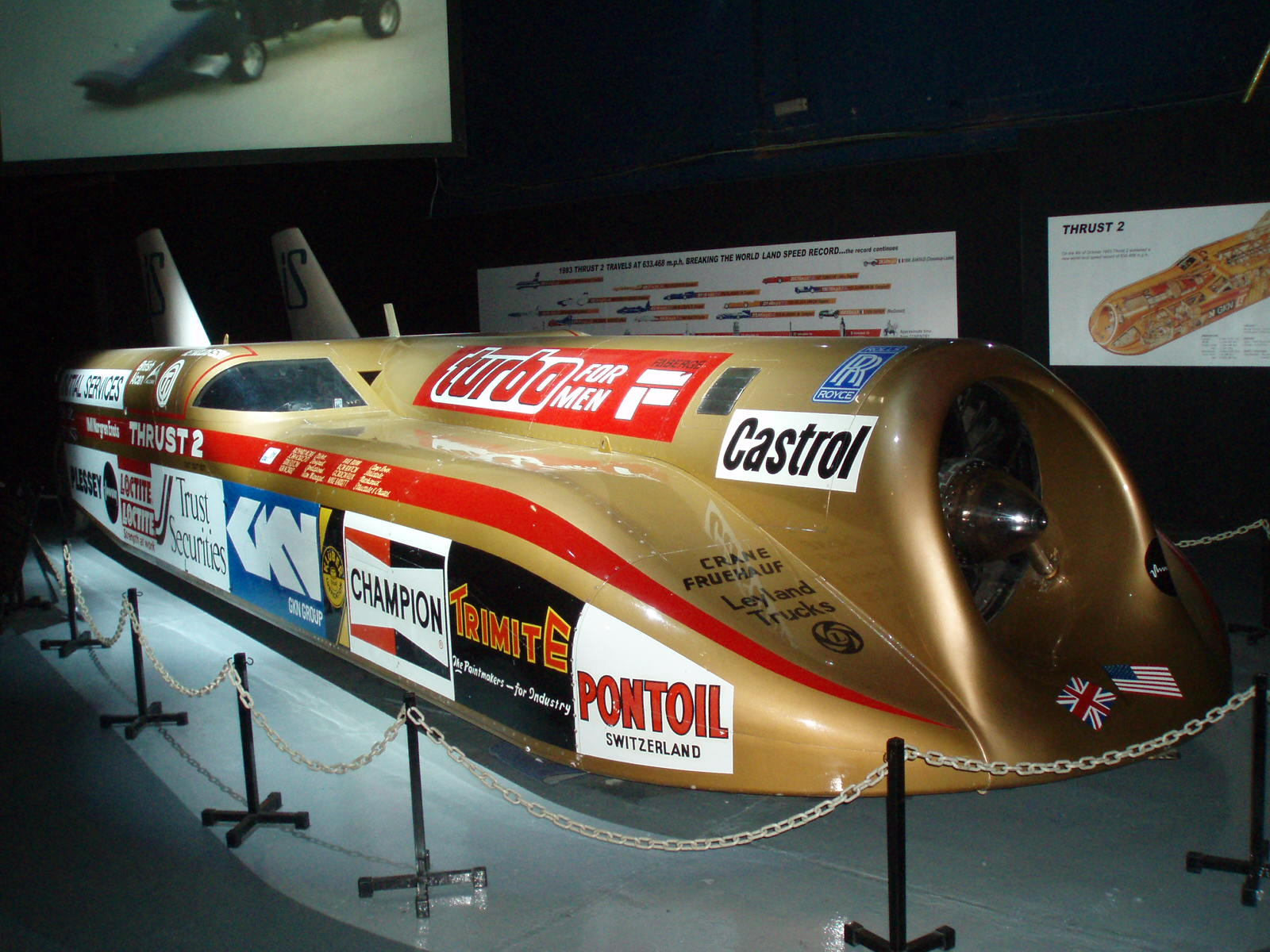
Thrust2 at the Coventry Transport Museum in 2007

In 1970, Gary Gabelich piloted the rocket-powered Blue Flame to a new world record at Bonneville with a speed of 622.407 mph (1,001.667 km/h). In 1983, this record was eclipsed by Thrust2, which was powered by a Rolls-Royce Avon jet engine and driven by Richard Noble to a speed of 633.468 mph (1,019.468 km/h). In 1997, the world land speed record was bested once more by ThrustSSC, which achieved a speed of 763 mph (1,228 km/h) in the Black Rock Desert with Andy Green at the controls. The car, which was powered by two Rolls-Royce Spey jet engines that manufacture a combined 110,000 hp (82,000 kW) and 50,000 pounds (23,000 kg) of thrust, became the first vehicle to break the sound barrier on land.

Jet-powered drag racing cars have also appeared in National Hot Rod Association (NHRA) events since the 1970s. Jet cars were first sanctioned by the NHRA in 1974, and in 1980 official approval was granted for jet-powered Funny Cars. In 1975, drag racer Phillip "Al" Eierdam created Emergency 1, a jet car powered by a Westinghouse J34 engine and stylized to mimic a fire engine. In the 1980s, Eierdam built and raced the rocket-engined Invader, often against his friend Sammy Miller and his rocket-powered Funny Car, Vanishing Point. The two contested the first side-by-side drag races between rocket-powered cars at Santa Pod Raceway in England. By 1989, Roger Gustin had built more jet cars than anyone else in drag racing and had won the Jet Car Nationals on five separate occasions. In the 2010s, jet cars have continued to be major attractions at NHRA events, participating in exhibitions such as four-wide races and achieving speeds in excess of 270 mph (430 km/h). During the 2012 season, Elaine Larsen and Marisha Falk both drove jet dragsters powered by General Electric J85 engines capable of producing 5,000 hp (3,700 kW).

== Non-racing applications ==
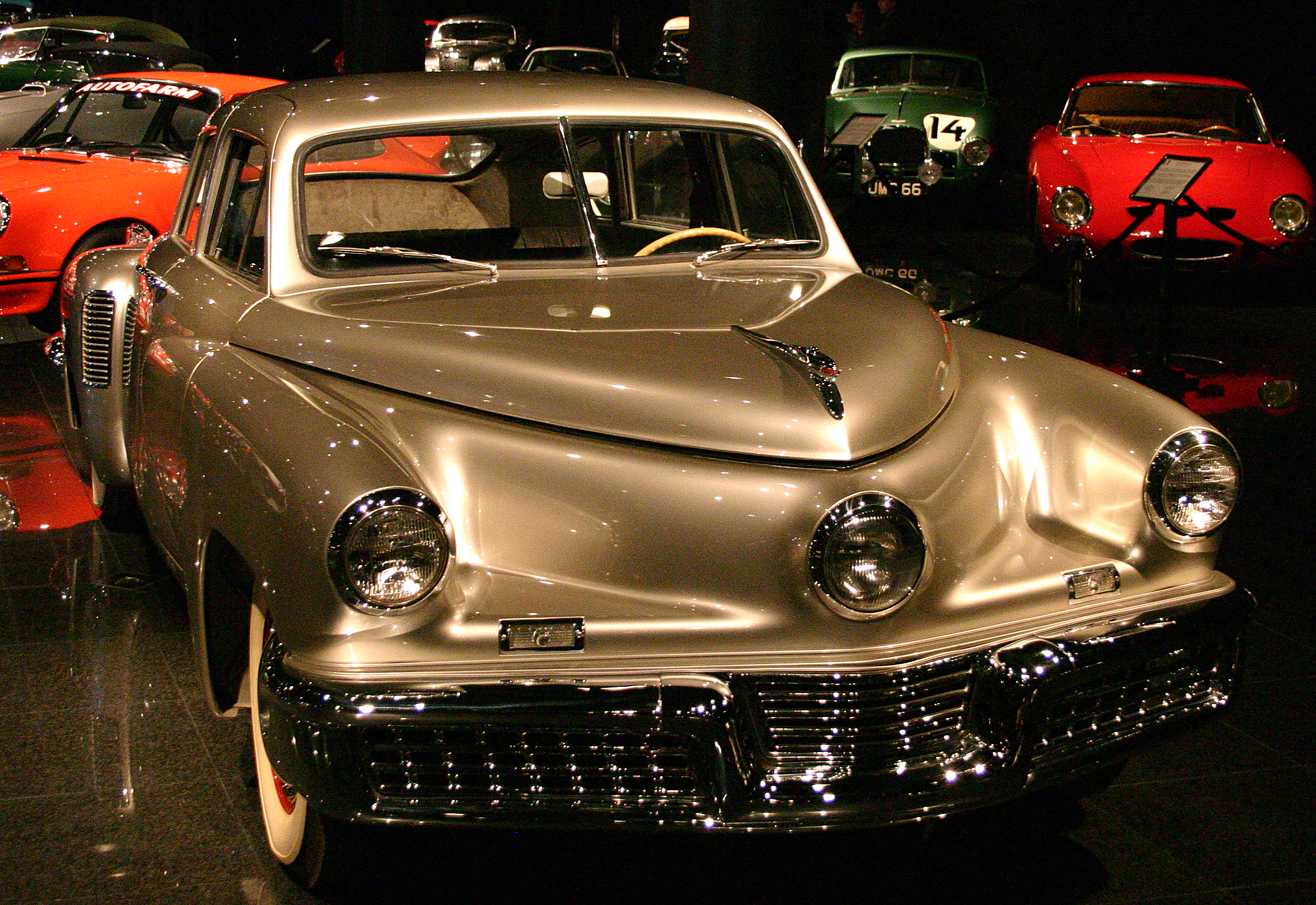
A Tucker 48 at the Blackhawk Museum in Danville, California

Although rare, aircraft engines have occasionally been chosen as the powerplant for road-going cars. One prime example is the Tucker 48, which was produced in 1947 and 1948 and powered by a flat-six Franklin O-335 helicopter engine. With a displacement of 5,473 cc (334.0 cu in), the engine produced 166 bhp (124 kW) at 3,200 rpm and produced a maximum of 372 pound-feet (504 N⋅m) of torque at 2,000 rpm, yet due largely to its all-alloy construction only weighed 320 pounds (150 kg). The engine enabled the Tucker 48 to reach a top speed of approximately 120 mph (190 km/h) and to accelerate from 0 to 60 mph (97 km/h) in 10 seconds. While the original O-335 helicopter engine was air-cooled, Tucker engineers modified it to water cooling, which helped improve the powerplant's durability while also giving the car the automotive industry's first fully sealed water-cooling system.

In the 1960s, British engineer Paul Jameson and transmission specialist John Dodd collaborated to build The Beast, a road car fitted with a 27-liter (1,648 cu in) Rolls-Royce Merlin engine. Using a General Motors Turbo-Hydramatic gearbox, the back axle from a Jaguar XJ12, doors cast from a Ford Cortina Mk III, and a fiberglass body reminiscent of a Ford Capri, the finished car had a "phallically long front end" that measured 10 feet. The Beast's engine produced approximately 950 bhp (710 kW) at 2,500 rpm which propelled it to a top speed in excess of 180 mph (290 km/h). The car averages less than 2 miles per imperial gallon (1.4 L/km). Once listed by the Guinness Book of Records as the world's most powerful road car, by 2012 The Beast had been located in Málaga.

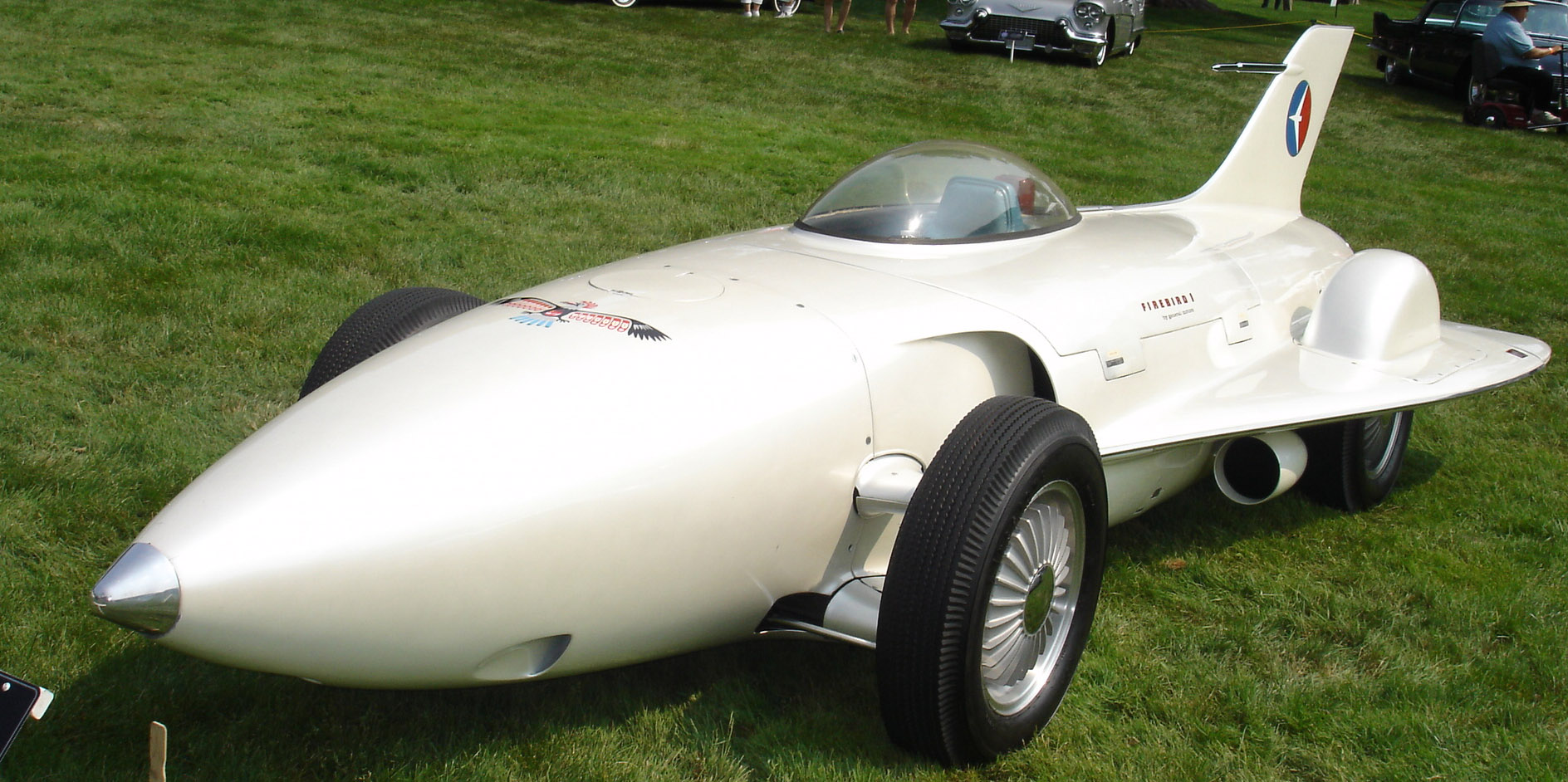
Firebird I in 2007

Turbine engines have also been utilized in concept and prototype road cars, such as the three General Motors Firebirds, the Fiat Turbina, and the Chrysler Turbine Car. In 1953, the General Motors XP-21 Firebird I became the first car powered by a gas turbine engine to be built in the United States. Never intended for production, the car was purely a design exercise to determine the feasibility of turbine-powered road cars. The car's body, which was made of plastic reinforced by fiberglass, was designed by Harley J. Earl, while its Whirlfire Turbo-Power engine was developed by Charles L. McCuen and the GM Research Laboratories Division. Driving the rear wheels of the car via a conventional transmission, the engine was able to produce 370 hp (280 kW) at 13,000 rpm. Its successor, Firebird II, debuted at General Motors Motorama in 1956. In addition to its regenerative gas turbine, the car featured a titanium body, fully independent suspension, power disc brakes, electric gear selection, and air conditioning that could be individually controlled. The last of GM's Firebirds, Firebird III, was built in 1958. It was the only Firebird to influence any GM production cars; both the 1959 and 1961 Cadillac lineups took styling cues from it. Noted for its extravagant tailfins, Firebird III also broke a number of Earl's styling rules with its very reserved use of chrome and lack of parallel lines. While GM planned a Firebird IV, it never came to fruition, although the three Firebirds did ultimately become the namesake of the Pontiac Firebird pony cars that debuted in 1967.

In 1954, Fiat introduced its own experimental turbine-engined prototype, the Turbina. The car was powered by a two-stage turbine that powered the wheels through a geared reduction unit, while its body was streamlined based on the results of wind tunnel testing. The Turbina's engine enabled it to achieve a top speed of 250 km/h (160 mph) as well as to produce 300 hp (220 kW) at 22,000 rpm.

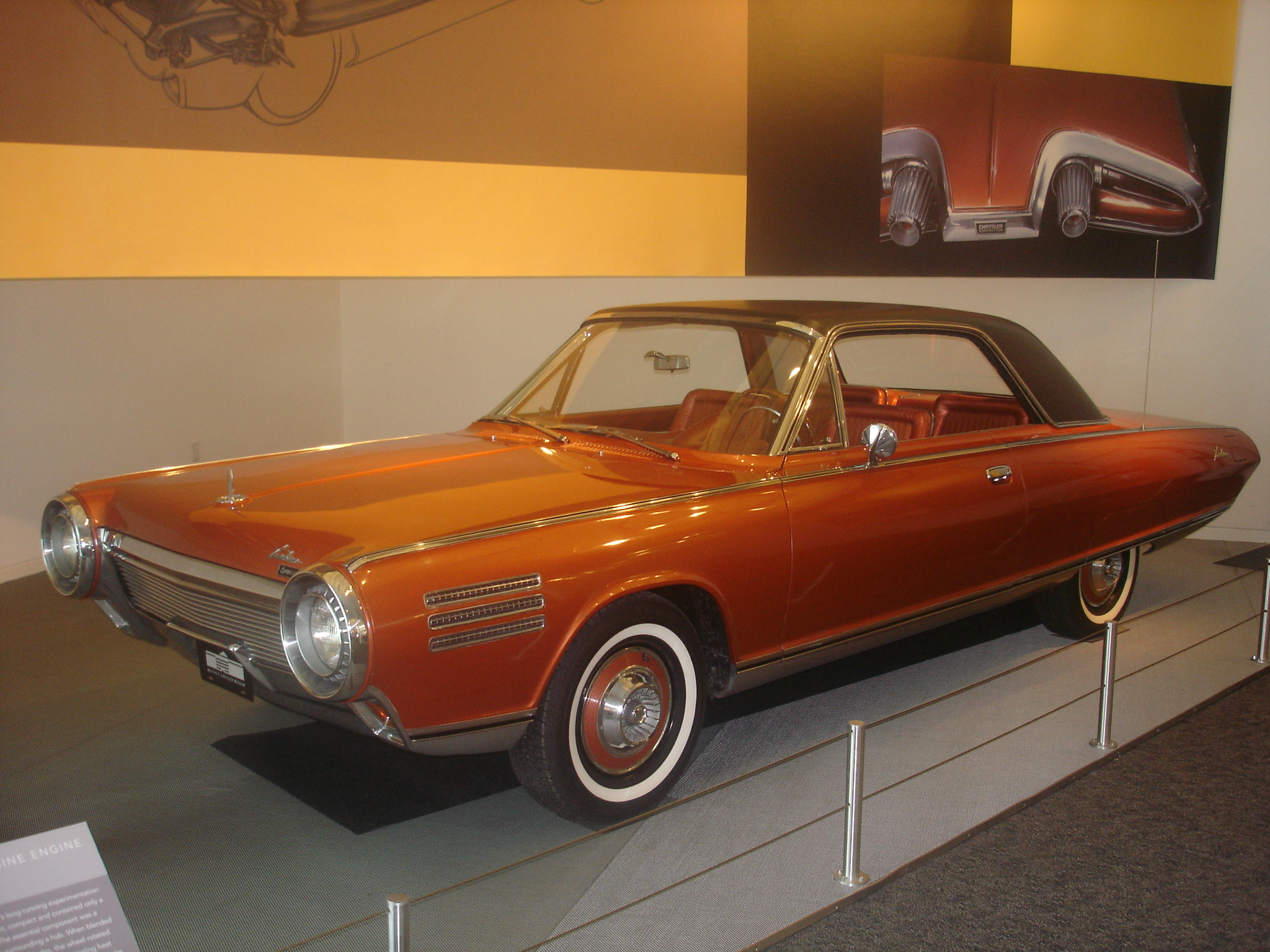
A Chrysler Turbine Car at the Walter P. Chrysler Museum in Auburn Hills, Michigan in 2007

Introduced to the public in 1963, the Chrysler Turbine Car was powered by a turbine that produced 130 hp (97 kW) and 425 lb⋅ft (576 N⋅m) of torque, which made its output roughly equivalent to a 318-cubic-inch (5.21 L) V8 engine. The turbine engine offered numerous advantages in a road car, including less need for maintenance due to fewer moving parts, general operating smoothness, greater dependability of starting in cold weather, lack of a need for antifreeze, minimal oil consumption, and the ability to run on almost any combustible liquid; the car is claimed to have run on fuels as diverse as peanut oil, Chanel No. 5 perfume, and tequila. However, there were also significant drawbacks with using a turbine engine in the car, namely high internal heat, lack of inherent engine braking, and high emissions of NO_{x}. Furthermore, the engine was better suited to the relatively continuous operation and constant speeds of aviation use than it was to the more disruptive, stop-and-go conditions of automotive use. On the highway, the car could achieve 19 miles per US gallon (0.12 L/km), but because the engine idled at 22,000 rpm it was less efficient in city driving. In addition to being less fuel efficient than a comparable V8-engined car, the Turbine Car was also substantially more expensive; Jay Leno estimates that the car would have cost around $16,000 if it was ever sold to the public, compared to about $5,000 for a piston-engined car of comparable performance.

== Revival ==
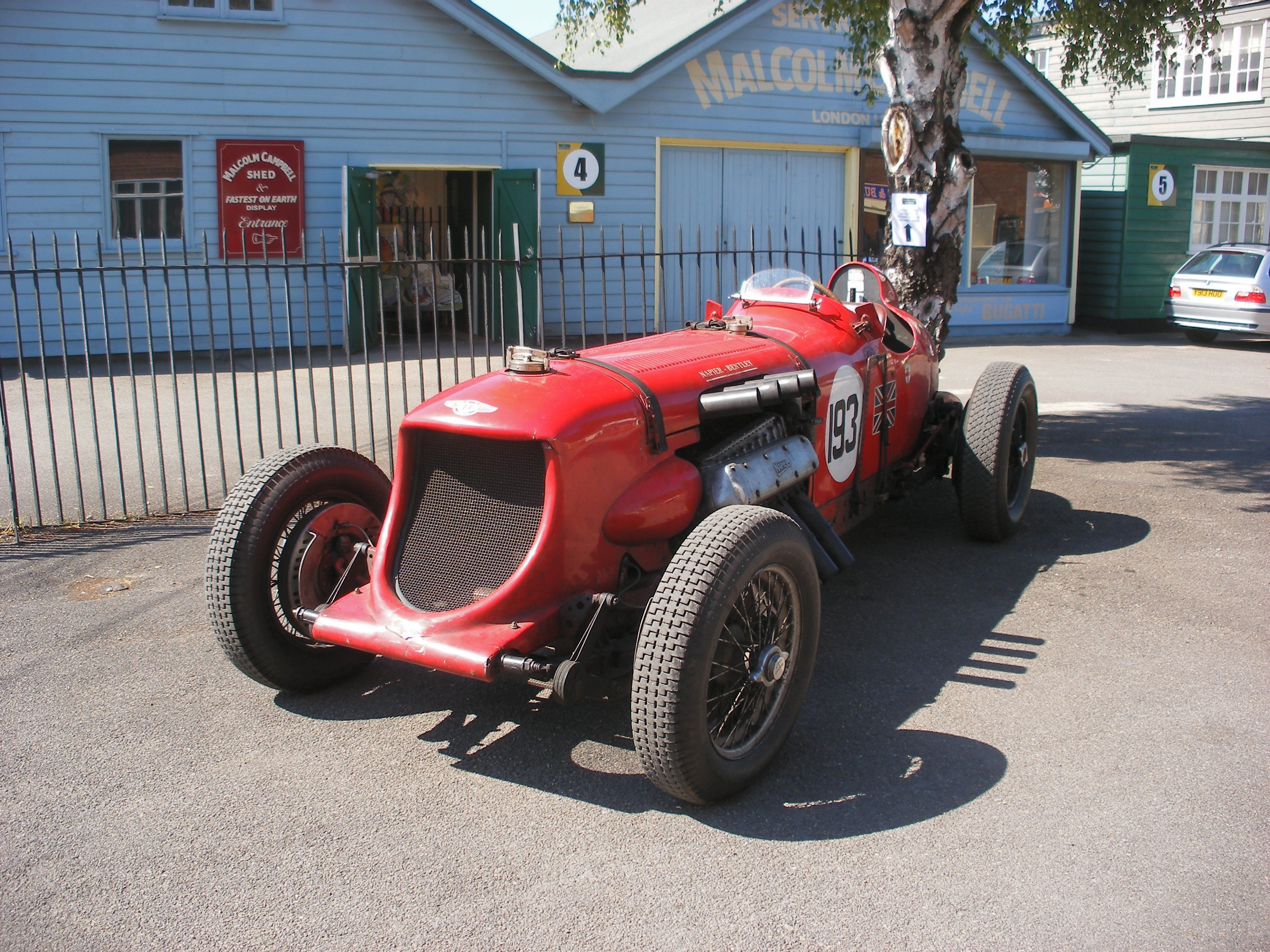
The Napier-Bentley at Brooklands in 2008

Even after the period in which they were competitive in the quest for the world land speed record, there has been continued and renewed interest in piston-driven aero-engined cars. One of the earliest cars created during this revival era is the Napier-Bentley, which was built by Peter Morley and David Llewellyn in 1972 in the spirit of the aero-engined cars that raced at Brooklands. The Napier-Bentley consists of a 1929 Bentley chassis and a 23.9-liter (1,458 cu in) Napier Sea Lion aircraft engine, which produces 580 bhp (430 kW) and 1,250 lb⋅ft (1,690 N⋅m) of torque. The car has been raced regularly, and was once involved in a crash that hospitalized Morley for a few weeks. In 1998, the Napier-Bentley was sold to Chris Williams. Williams has also designed and built the Packard-Bentley, which he envisioned as a tribute to the interwar aero-engined racing cars that competed at Brooklands. Built over a period of seven years, the car, which is nicknamed "Mavis", made its debut at the 2010 Cholmondeley Pageant of Power. The Packard-Bentley is made up of a Bentley 8 Litre chassis and a 40.8-liter (2,490 cu in), V12 Packard engine taken from an American World War II torpedo boat. The engine gives the car 1,500 bhp (1,100 kW) at 2,400 rpm, while allowing it to achieve a top speed of approximately 160 mph (260 km/h) and a fuel efficiency of four imperial gallons (18 L) per minute. The Packard-Bentley is valued at around £350,000.

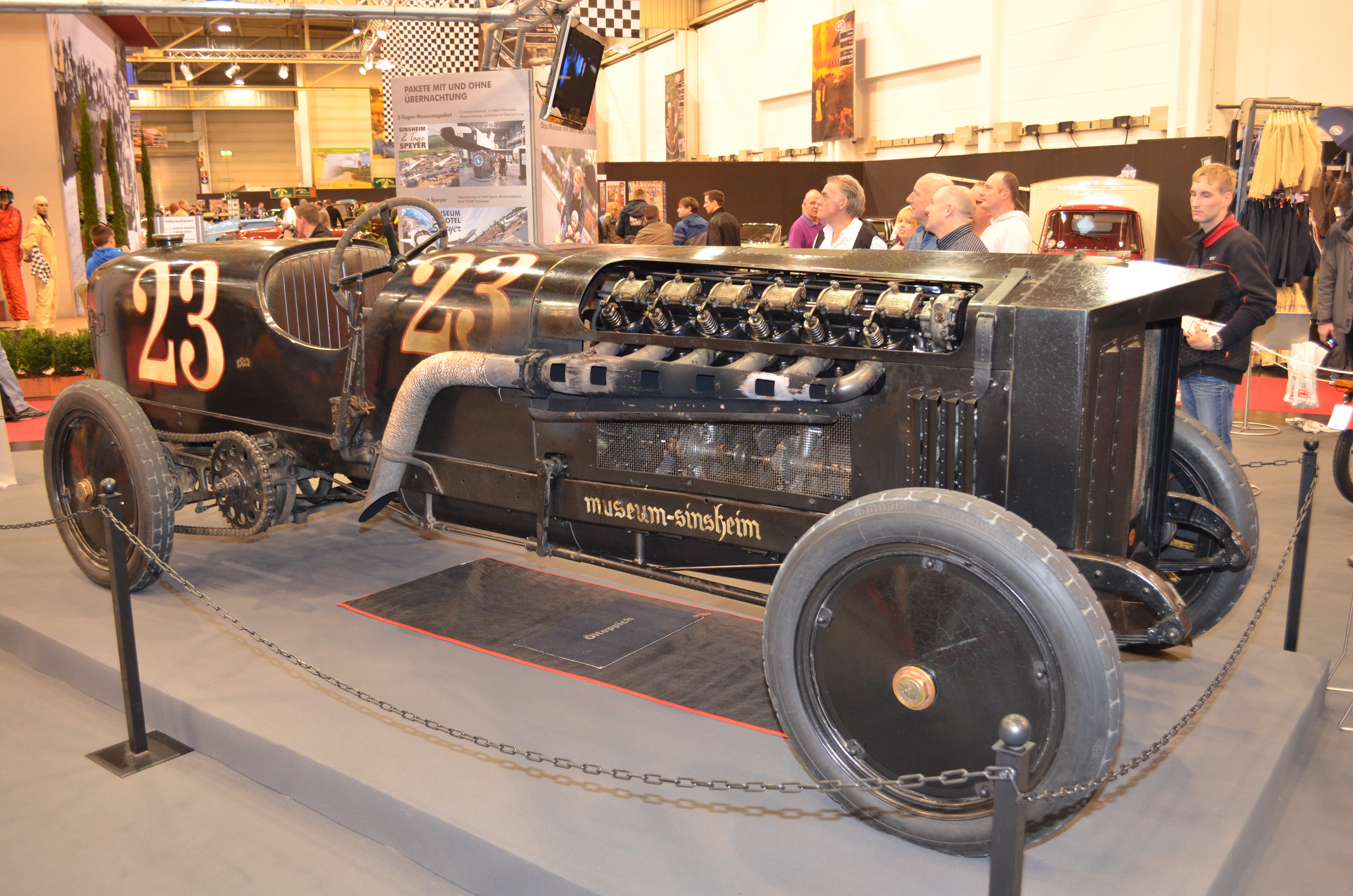
The "Brutus" at Motorshow Essen in 2013

Aero-engined cars also made an appearance on the British television program Top Gear on 4 March 2012, during the sixth episode of Season 18, when both the BMW-engined "Brutus" and Rolls-Royce-engined "Meteor" were featured. The Brutus was built in Germany shortly after World War II, when a 1908 American LaFrance car was fitted with a 46.9-liter (2,862 cu in) V12 BMW aircraft engine that dates to 1925. The car was created over several years at a workshop at the Auto & Technik Museum in Sinsheim, Germany, which still owns it. According to the Museum, the Brutus can produce 500 hp (370 kW) at 1,500 rpm, while its fuel efficiency averages 1 L/km (2.8 mpg_{‑imp}). After driving the car on Top Gear, presenter Jeremy Clarkson described the experience as akin to "doing a crossword while being eaten by a tiger". The Meteor that appeared during the same episode has the chassis from a 1930s Rolls-Royce Phantom and a World War II-vintage, 27-liter (1,648 cu in) Rolls-Royce Meteor engine. The engine produces 850 bhp (630 kW), which allows the car to achieve a top speed of 160 mph (260 km/h) and a fuel efficiency of roughly 2 mpg_{‑imp} (1.4 L/km). In 2013, the Meteor went on sale for a price "in excess of £500,000".

== See also ==
- Aircraft engine
- Vehicles powered by Napier Lion engines
- Blastolene Special (custom-built car powered by a Continental AV1790-5B tank engine)
