= Packard-Bentley =

Packard-Bentley Special
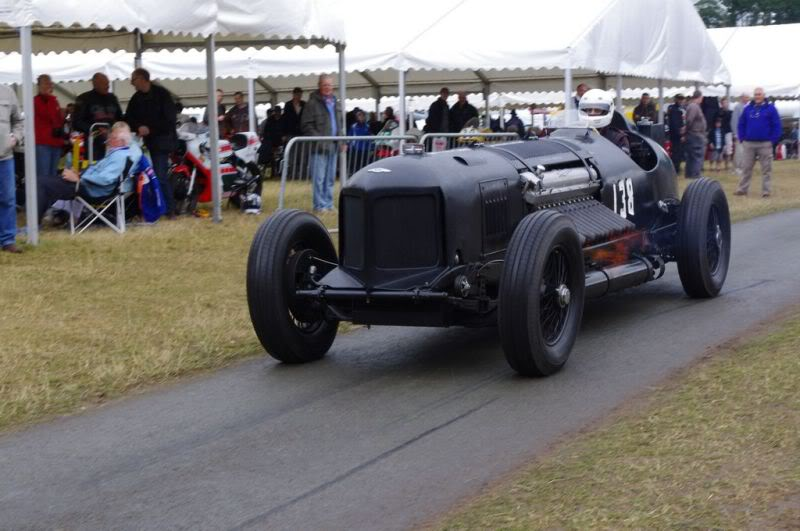

Overview
- Also called: Mavis
- Production: 2010
- Assembly: Cholmondeley, Cheshire
- Designer: Chris Williams

Body and chassis
- Body style: Open-Wheeler
- Layout: FR layout
- Platform: Bentley 8 Litre
- Related: Napier-Bentley; Napier-Railton; Bentley 8 Litre; Brutus (car); The Beast; Meteor

Powertrain
- Engine: 40,811.83 cc (2,490.5 cu in; 40.8 L) Packard 1A-2500 V12
- Power output: 1,500 horsepower (1,521 PS; 1,119 kW); 2,000 pound-feet (2,712 N⋅m)
- Transmission: 3-speed manual

Dimensions
- Wheelbase: 3,556 millimetres (140.0 in)
- Length: 7,380 millimetres (291 in)
- Width: 2,446 millimetres (96.3 in)
- Height: 2,000 millimetres (79 in)
- Curb weight: 2,400 kilograms (5,291 lb)

The Packard-Bentley Mavis is a one-off racing car. It is powered by a 41.6 L (2,540 cu in) Packard 4M-2500 V-12, developing 1,500 bhp (1,100 kW) and 2,000 lb⋅ft (2,700 N⋅m) of torque, sourced from an American World War II-era marine military PT boat.

The car was built by Vintage Sports-Car Club member and Napier-Bentley owner Chris Williams, and debuted at the Cholmondeley Pageant of Power in July 2010.

The Packard-Bentley is based on a 1930 Bentley 8-litre chassis, highly modified. The car also has 24 exhaust pipes, reflecting its engine's twin-port design. The steering column is offset and angled to allow it to clear the huge engine block.

The car is a very popular spectator attraction, both static and while being driven. As of 2019, it is now housed in Technik Museum Speyer, Germany, where it has previously featured in their "Brazzeltag" convention.
