= Elaine Larsen =

American drag racer

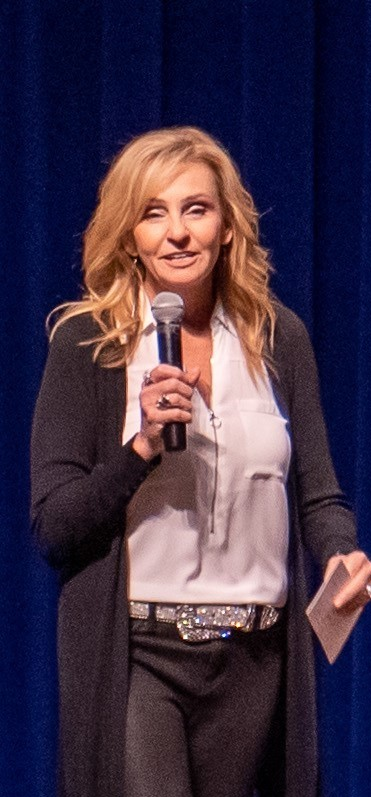
- Larsen in 2022
- Born: Michigan, US
- Occupation: Drag racing

Elaine Larsen is an American drag racer and motorsports company owner. She has won two world championships for her jet car drag racing. She was named to Forbes's 50 over 50 in 2025.

== Biography ==
Larsen was raised by Mennonites in Michigan: her family were farmers who observed an "Amish-like" limited acceptance of technology.

She married her high school sweetheart, Chris. The two began drag racing as a hobby, after Chris bought a Chevrolet Vega, and Elaine soon began to love it. The two decided to build their own jet dragster, utilizing her passion for racing and her husband's for aviation, and soon joined the pro leagues. She has utilized second-hand jet engines from Northrop F-5 for these dragsters. She has been described as "never giving in to fear" during her racing. In 2011, she crashed into a wall at 280 miles per hour in Columbus, Ohio, during a drag race, and had to have titanium plates and screws installed in her skull. However, she continued racing. In 2014 and 2015, she consecutively won the International Hot Rod Association Jet Dragster World Championships.

She also headed the team at her jet racing research and development organization, Larsen Motorsports, founded in 2006, which also includes other drivers, all women. She stepped back from full-time racing in 2022 after a tour titled the "Two Decades of Thrills: Full Throttle Tour".

She has helped launch the Florida Tech Jet Dragsters Team. She runs a nonprofit, Blazing Trails, which introduces students to STEM careers, and stated that she works on it full time since her retirement from driving.

She was featured in Jay Leno's Garage in 2016, and named to the Space Coast Sports Hall of Fame that same year. She was named to the Forbes 50 over 50 in 2025.
