= Packard 1A-2500 =

American V-12 liquid-cooled aircraft engine

1A-2500
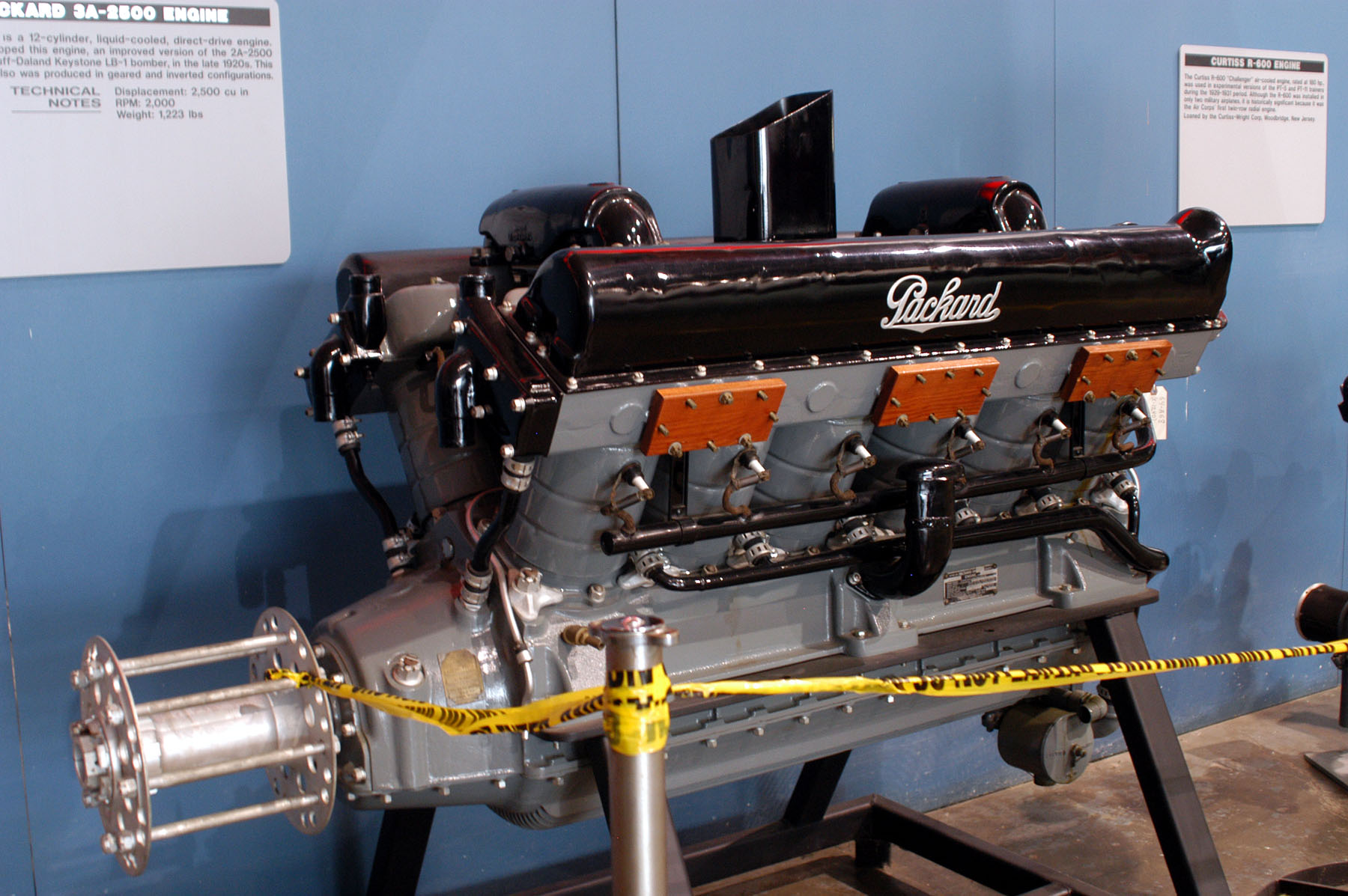
- A preserved Packard 3A-2500 on display at the National Museum of the United States Air Force
- Type: Liquid-cooled V12 engine
- National origin: United States
- Manufacturer: Packard
- First run: 1924
- Number built: 258
- Developed from: Packard 1A-1500

The Packard 1A-2500 is an American V12 liquid-cooled aircraft engine designed by Packard in 1924 as a successor to the World War I-era Liberty L-12. Five aero variants were produced, of which the 3A-2500 was the most numerous. Three marine versions, used most prominently in American World War II PT-boats, the 3M-2500, 4M-2500, and 5M-2500, were also derived from it.

== Applications ==
- Boeing TB
- Heinkel HE 8
- Martin T3M
- Naval Aircraft Factory PN
- Huff-Daland LB-1
- PT boats - marine versions of the 3M/4M/5M-2500
- Packard-Bentley one-off race car
- USSR World War II torpedo boats and sub-chasers, which were fitted with 535 4M-2500 engines with W-8 modification under Lend-Lease

== Variants ==
1A-2500
1924, 800 hp. Six built.
2A-2500
1925, 800 hp. 75 built.
2A-2540
? Huff-Daland XHB-1
3A-2500
1926, Geared propeller drive option, 800 hp. 175 built.
4A-2500
1927, fitted with a supercharger, 900 hp. One built.
5A-2500
1930, experimental use only, 1500 hp. One built.
3M-2500
Marine version
4M-2500
Marine version, 1200 hp (895 kW), subsequently upgraded in stages to 1500 hp (1,150 kW).
5M-2500
Marine version, larger supercharger, aftercooler, and power output of 1850 hp

== Engines on display ==
- A Packard 3A-2500 is on display at the National Museum of the United States Air Force.
- A Packard 3A-2500 is in storage at the National Air and Space Museum.
- A Packard 3A-2500 is on display at the New England Air Museum.
- A Packard 4M-2500 is on display at the Packard Proving Grounds Historical Site in Shelby Twp., Michigan.
- A Packard Series 142 Diesel Model 1D-1700 is on display at the Packard Proving Grounds Historical Site in Shelby Twp., Michigan.
- Three working Packard 5M-2500s are installed in the only operational PT boat, Higgins PT-658 in Portland, Oregon.

== Specifications (1A-2500) ==
Data from Aircraft Engine Historical Society and Race With the Wind By Birch Matthews

=== General characteristics ===
- Type: 60° V12
- Bore: 6 3/8 in (162 mm)
- Stroke: 6 1/2 in (165 mm)
- Displacement: 2,540 cu in (41.6 L)
- Dry weight: 1,120 lb (510 kg)

=== Components ===
- Valvetrain: Four valves per cylinder, overhead camshaft
- Fuel type: Petrol
- Cooling system: Liquid-cooled

=== Performance ===
- Power output: 850 hp (630 kW) at 2,500 rpm
- Specific power: 0.33 hp/in³ (15.2 kW/L)
- Power-to-weight ratio: 0.76 hp/lb (1.25 kW/kg)

== See also ==
- Fairmile D motor torpedo boat
- Packard 1A-1500
- Packard-Bentley
- Fleet Obsolete

Comparable engines

- BMW VI
- Mikulin AM-34
- Rolls-Royce Buzzard

Related lists

- List of aircraft engines
