= Napier-Bentley =

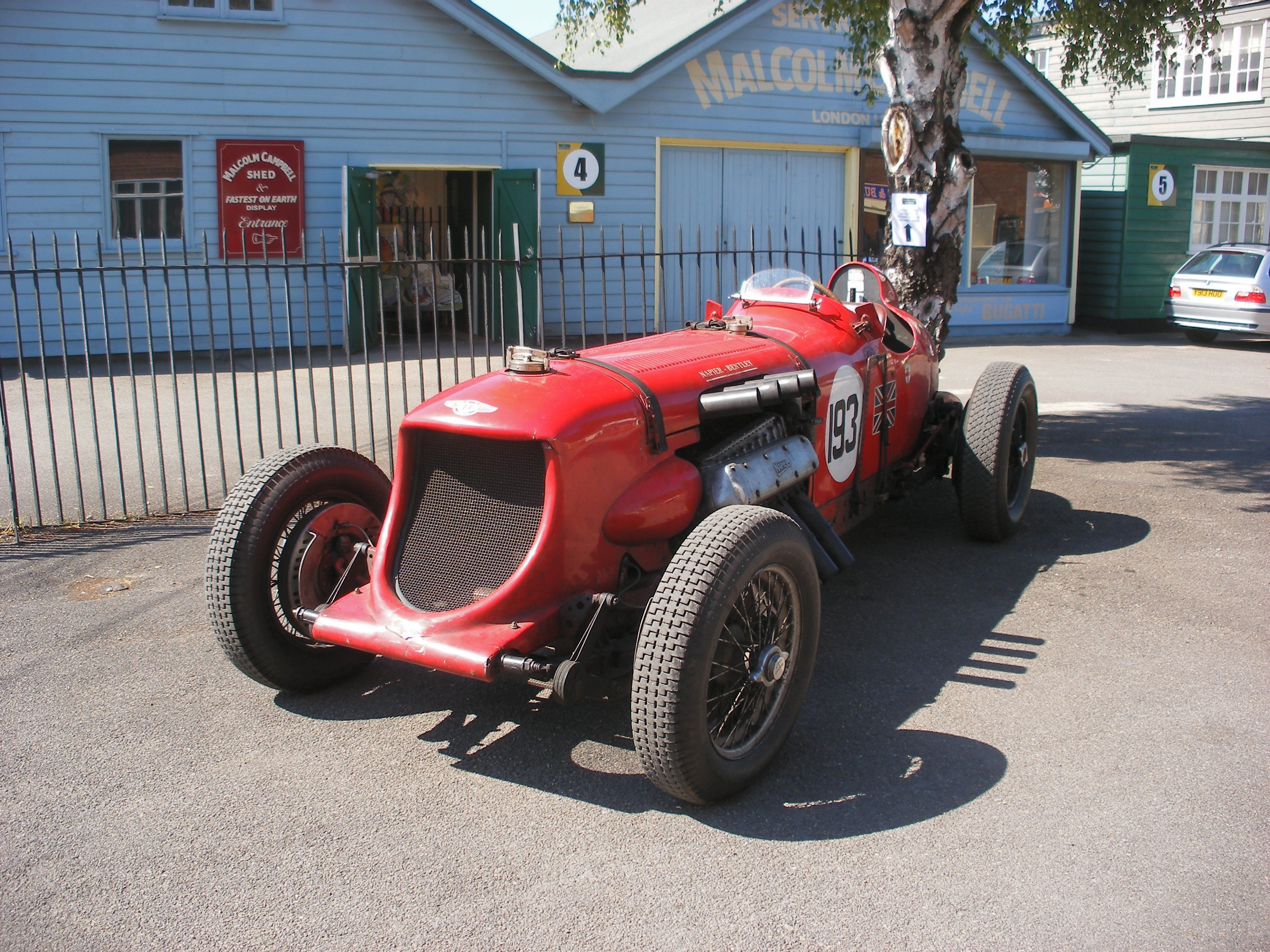

Overview
- Production: c. 1972
- Assembly: England

Body and chassis
- Body style: Single-seater
- Layout: FR layout
- Related: Napier-Railton, Packard Bentley

Powertrain
- Engine: 24,000 cc Napier Sea-Lion W12 aero engine

The Napier-Bentley is a vintage racing car.

== History ==
It was a one-off special built in 1972 by David Llewellyn and Peter Morley. It was based on a chassis constructed from two 4-litre Bentley sideframe members, shortened and modified to a 10-foot (3.0 m) wheelbase. It has a 24-litre Napier Sea Lion W12 boat engine based on the Napier Lion aeroplane engine (the same as that used in the silver Napier-Railton, which it resembles closely), which develops approximately 550 bhp (410 kW). The Napier-Bentley is seen at historic racing events mostly in the United Kingdom, but has appeared at European events.

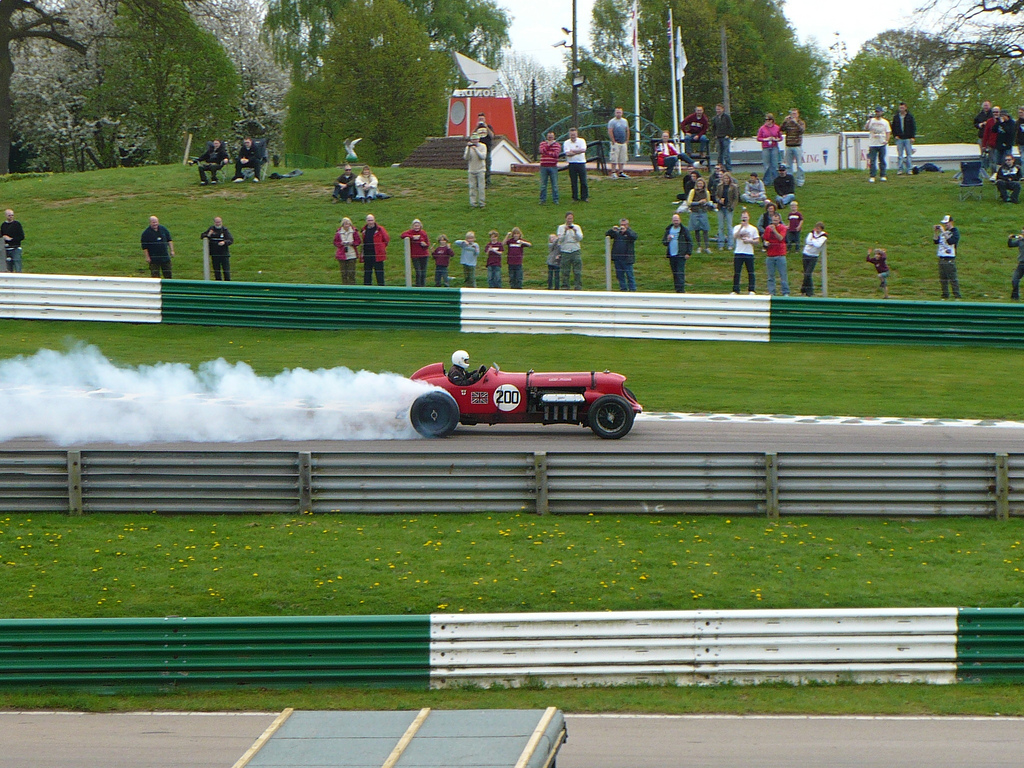
Christoper Williams entertains the crowds in the Napier Bentley at Mallory Park

With its red bodywork and Napier-Railton-esque grille, it is spectacular and entertaining in action. Being a W12, the engine has three banks of four very large stub exhausts, one of which points straight out of the side of the car. The sound of the car has been likened to a World War I biplane or cluster or mortar bombs going off. Due to the immense torque of the engine (approx. 1,400 lb⋅ft (1,900 N⋅m)), the rear tyres can be made to produce clouds of smoke whenever the car is launched, while the exhausts produce sparks, flames and smoke.

During the 30 years that he owned the car, Peter Morley and his son, Clive Morley, raced the car frequently until it was sold in 1999. Peter and Clive Morley, as well as Clive's two sons, are still active in racing vintage Bentleys. Since 1999, the car has been owned by Chris Williams, and coveted by his daughter, Rachael, who wishes to race it as well. Chris Williams later constructed another similar vintage special, the Packard-Bentley.
