= Rolls-Royce Merlin alternative uses =

Uses of the Rolls-Royce Merlin engine

The Rolls-Royce Merlin, although designed as an aero engine, was used in other applications both on land and at sea. An unsupercharged derivative called the Meteor was developed for use in tanks.

== Automotive ==
Michael Wilcock of Sussex, England, built the Swandean Spitfire Special, using a Merlin XXV engine acquired from a scrap yard for £140. The engine was installed in a home-brewed chassis confected from two Daimler Dingo scout car chassis. The car was run in the Brighton Speed Trials in 1953, and was sold to James Duffy of St. Louis, Missouri, in 1956. As of 2005, the vehicle is still in St. Louis, where it is undergoing restoration.

=== "The Beast" ===
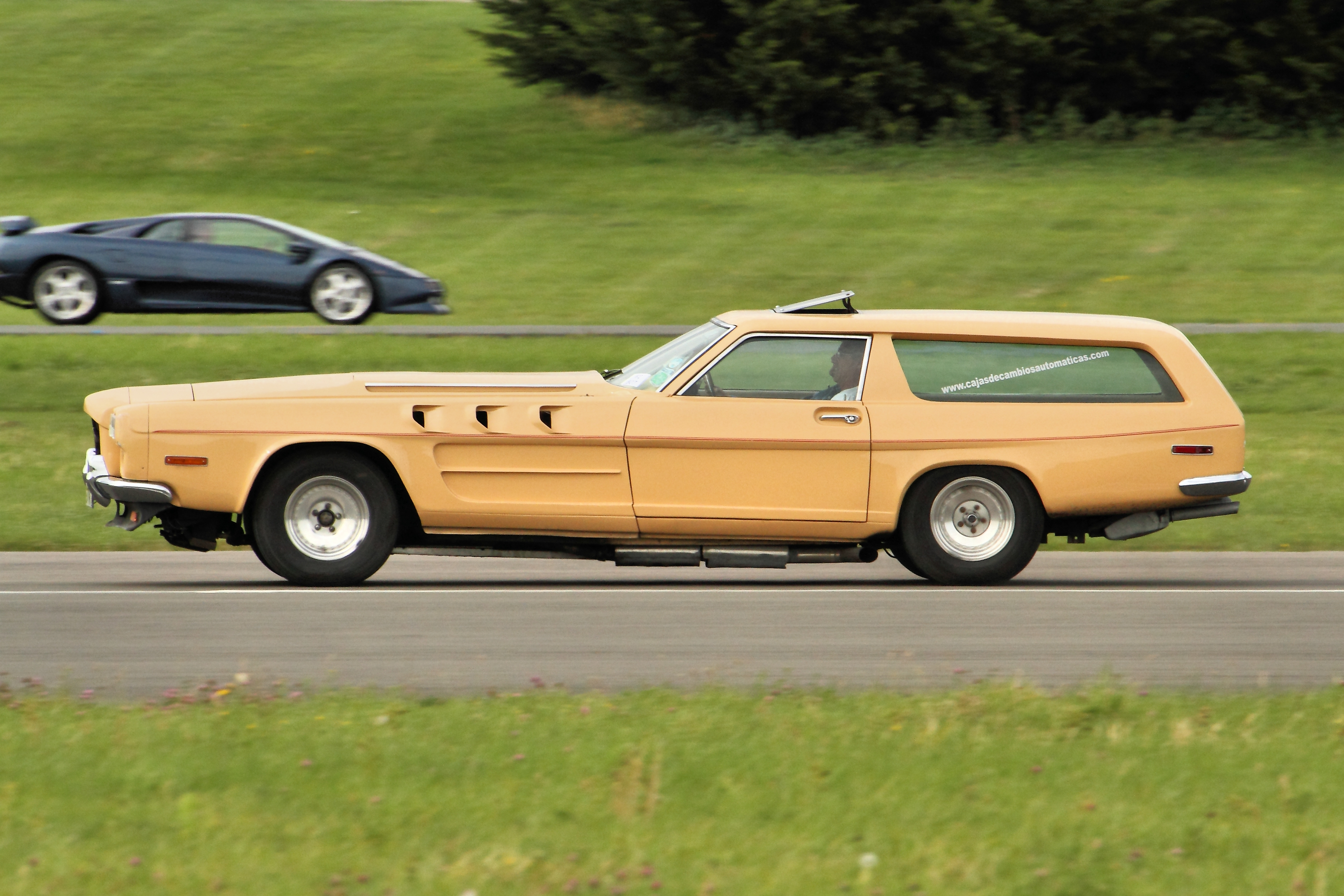
The Beast (mk2) at Wings and Wheels in 2014.

In the 1960s, engineer Paul Jameson put a Rolls-Royce Meteor engine into a chassis he built himself. He did not get around to building a body, and sold the car to Epsom-based automatic transmission specialist John Dodd, who had supplied the automatic gearbox. Fibre Glass Repairs in Bromley, Kent, fitted a fibreglass body, based around a modified Ford Capri 'funny car' bodyshell, and the finished car, registered in the UK in 1972, was named The Beast. The Beast was extremely popular at car shows all over Europe, featuring in numerous custom car publications in the 1970s and 1980s. It was once listed in the Guinness Book of Records as the world's most powerful road car.

At some point in the late 1970s or early 1980s, the first iteration of the Beast caught fire on the way back from a car show in Stockholm (a trip during which Dodd was purportedly invited to meet Carl XVI Gustaf, King of Sweden, who wished to see the car). Dodd was unable to extinguish the fire - the Beast was reduced to a burnt wreck, and had to be rebuilt. As such, the Beast has used two different fibreglass bodies during its life; the first (mk1) was the Ford Capri-inspired shape in dark red, as supplied by Fibre Glass Repairs, and the existing Beast (mk2) is a 2-door estate car in beige. The engine used in the mk1 Beast was a Meteor tank engine as supplied by Jameson, but upon rebuilding the car after the fire, Dodd sourced a Merlin engine from a Boulton Paul Balliol training aircraft. The engine drives a General Motors TH400 automatic transmission, via the step-up gearbox devised by Dodd to allow the low-revving Merlin engine to work properly with the conventional GM transmission. Perhaps due to space constraints as well as roadworthiness considerations, the Merlin used in the Beast is non-supercharged. Power has never been independently verified, although a figure of around 950 bhp is estimated. Dodd claimed that the highest speed he achieved in the Beast was in the region of 185 mph (around 300 km/h), although the theoretical top speed is higher.

In both incarnations the car used Rolls-Royce grilles, badges, and hood ornaments, none of which were authorised by the company. The Beast was brought to the attention of Rolls-Royce, who took Dodd to court after he refused to remove their radiator grille, badges, and Spirit of Ecstasy mascot. After a heavily publicised trial, Dodd lost the court case and the Rolls-Royce trademarked features were removed. The grille was replaced with one bearing Dodd's "JD" initials. It was around this time that Dodd moved to live in southern Spain, continuing to use the car and regularly driving it long distances to automotive shows, until his death in December 2022.

In March 2023, the Beast was listed for sale by auction in the UK, for the first time since it was registered in 1972. The car is also MOT exempt and ULEZ exempt, and is still registered as a Rolls-Royce according to its V5C logbook.

In the 1970s, Paul Jameson built a Merlin-engined car of his own, this being a mid-engined six-wheeler. The engine of this vehicle was two-stage supercharged and was, in 1988, reportedly in a museum in The Netherlands. His second was fitted in a 1934 Rolls-Royce Phantom II, now owned by TV presenter Jay Leno in California.

=== "Final Objective" ===
Recently in Australia, Rod Hadfield, of the Castlemaine Rod Shop, used the Merlin engine in a 1955 Chevrolet Bel Air sports coupe, which was named "Final Objective". The car has an aircraft-themed paint scheme.

=== Rover SD1 ===
A Rover SD1 was substantially modified by Charlie Broomfield using a Rover Meteor tank derivative of the Merlin. A car mechanic in the UK, he later gave input as a technical guru for Practical Performance Car Magazine. In 2017, the car was matte black and its stated aim was to achieve 200 mph (320 km/h).

== Boat racing ==
In the mid-1940s early 1950s, aviation engines gained in popularity as powerplants of choice for unlimited hydroplane racing given their relatively high power-to-weight ratio, reliability, and availability. Starting with the Miss Windsor raceboat at Detroit in 1946, several ever-more-powerful variants of the Merlin were so used, over the next decades, in a heated battle against the equally popular Allison V-1710. In unlimited hydroplane racing, both were eventually supplanted by gas turbine engines, which exhibit even more favourable power-to-size and power-to-weight ratios.

Some of the most significant Merlin-powered hydroplanes include:

- Slo-mo-shun V (from 1954 on, 1954 Gold Cup winner, first for Merlin power)
- Miss Thriftway (converted in 1957, 1957 Gold Cup winner)
- Hawaii Kai III (1958 Gold Cup and National Champion, first Merlin powered National Championship)
- Miss Thriftway/Miss Century 21 (Gold Cup 1961-1962, National Champion 1960-1962)
- Miss Bardahl (Gold Cup and National Champion 1963-1965, 1967-1968)
- Miss Budweiser (Gold Cup 1969-1970 and 1973, National Champion 1969-1972, 1977)
- Atlas Van Lines (Gold Cup 1972, 1977-1979, 1982-1984, National Champion 1972, 1976, 1978- 1979, 1982-1983
- Pay 'n Pak (Gold Cup 1974-1975, National Champion 1973-1975).

== Meteor ==
The Meteor was a tank engine developed from the Merlin in World War II. It was detuned, did not have a supercharger, and ran on lower-octane pool petrol (as did the early Merlins). Manufacture was transferred from Rolls-Royce to Rover, who developed the smaller Meteorite V-8 engine from it.

== Bibliography ==
- Booij, Jereon. "27 Litres, nine court cases, 268 mph (in theory), one jail sentence: meet The Beast and the man who unleashed it." (Article and images) Classic Cars Issue 428, March 2009.
- Mc Whirter, Norris (editor.) . Guinness Book of World Records 22nd edition, 1975. Enfield, UK: Guinness Superlatives Ltd, 1975. ISBN 0-900424-26-5
