= Napier-Railton =

1933 Napier-Railton
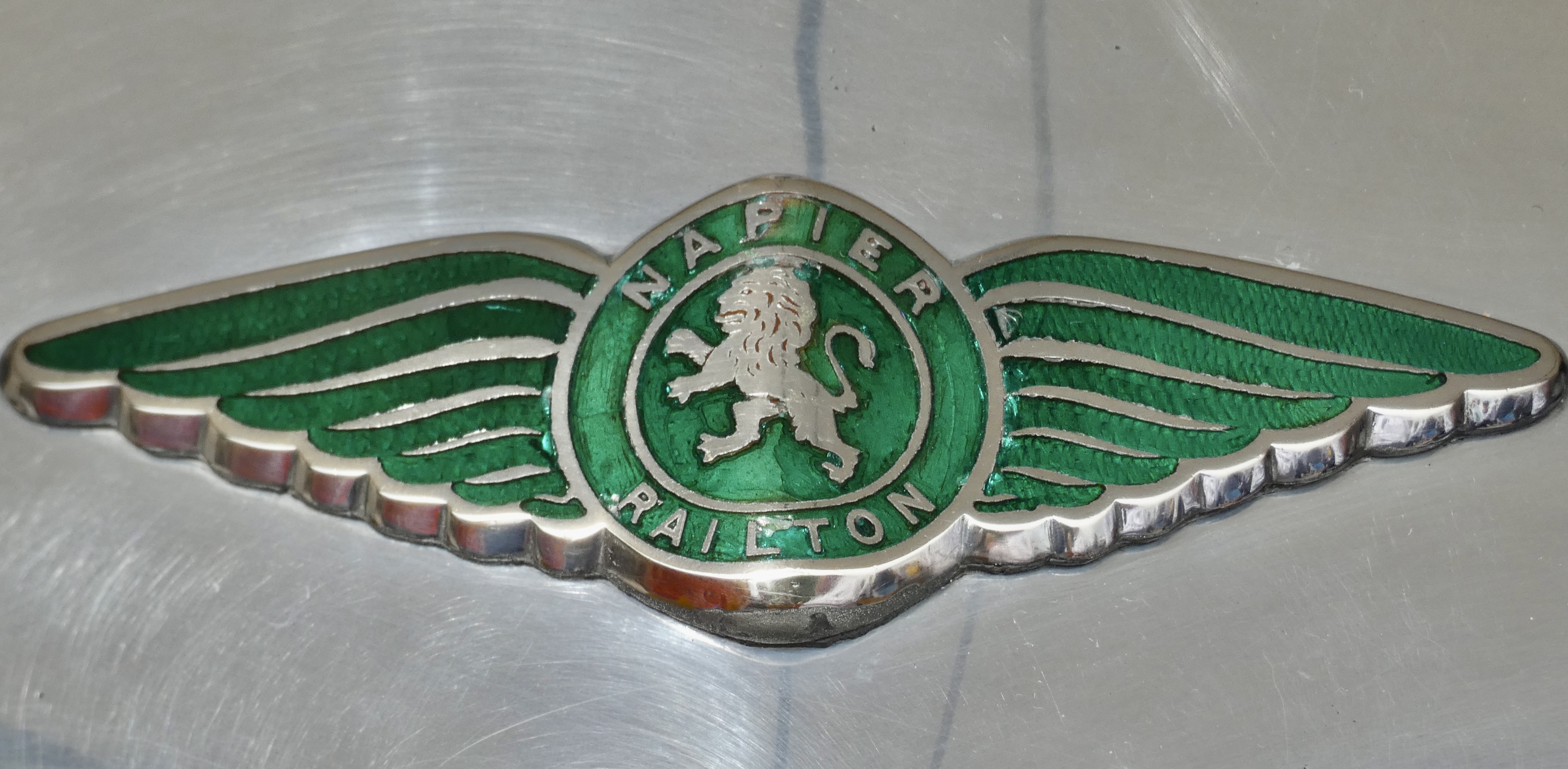

Overview
- Designer: Reid Railton

Body and chassis
- Body style: Single-seater
- Layout: FR layout
- Related: Napier-Bentley

Powertrain
- Engine: 24 L Napier XIA W12 aero engine

The Napier-Railton is an aero-engined racing car built in 1933, designed by Reid Railton to a commission by John Cobb, and built by Thomson & Taylor. It was driven by Cobb, mainly at the Brooklands race track where it holds the all-time lap record (143.44 mph [230.84 km/h]) which was set in 1935. The circuit was appropriated for military purposes during the Second World War, and never reopened in that form for racing. It has a W12 engine with 3 different exhaust systems.

== History ==
Between 1933 and 1937, the Napier-Railton broke 47 world speed records at Brooklands, Autodrome de Linas-Montlhéry and Bonneville Salt Flats in Utah. It was also entered in a number of races at Brooklands, the most prominent success being taking the Brooklands 500 miles race in 1935, Cobb sharing the driving with Tim Rose-Richards.

The car is powered by the high compression version (6.1:1) (RAF specification) of the naturally aspirated Napier Lion, a W12 of 23.944 litres (1,461 cu in) capacity, producing 580 bhp (433 kW) at 2585 revolutions per minute (recorded at 5,000 ft [1,500 m] – performance at ground level may be different), and 1,250 lb⋅ft (1,695 N⋅m) of torque. The 12 cylinders are in three banks of four (broad-arrow configuration), hence the triple exhaust system, and the engine has standard aerospace features such as dual magneto ignition. The non-synchromesh crash gearbox (named for the horrible noises caused by a mis-shift) has 3 ratios. The fuel tank, located in the boat-tail behind the driver, has a capacity of 65 imp gal (300 L; 78 US gal), fuel consumption was approximately 5 mpg_{‑imp} (56 L/100 km; 4.2 mpg_{‑US}).

Following the Second World War, the car was, for a short time, repurposed to test the drogue chutes of aircraft. It was also used in the film Pandora and the Flying Dutchman.

Postwar owners include Patrick Lindsay and Victor Gauntlett. The car was purchased by Brooklands Museum circa 1997 with the support of the UK's Heritage Lottery Fund and other donors. It is maintained in fully working order and is normally on display in one of the museum's 1930s motoring sheds. The car is run regularly and is usually present at the Goodwood Revival motor race meeting every September.

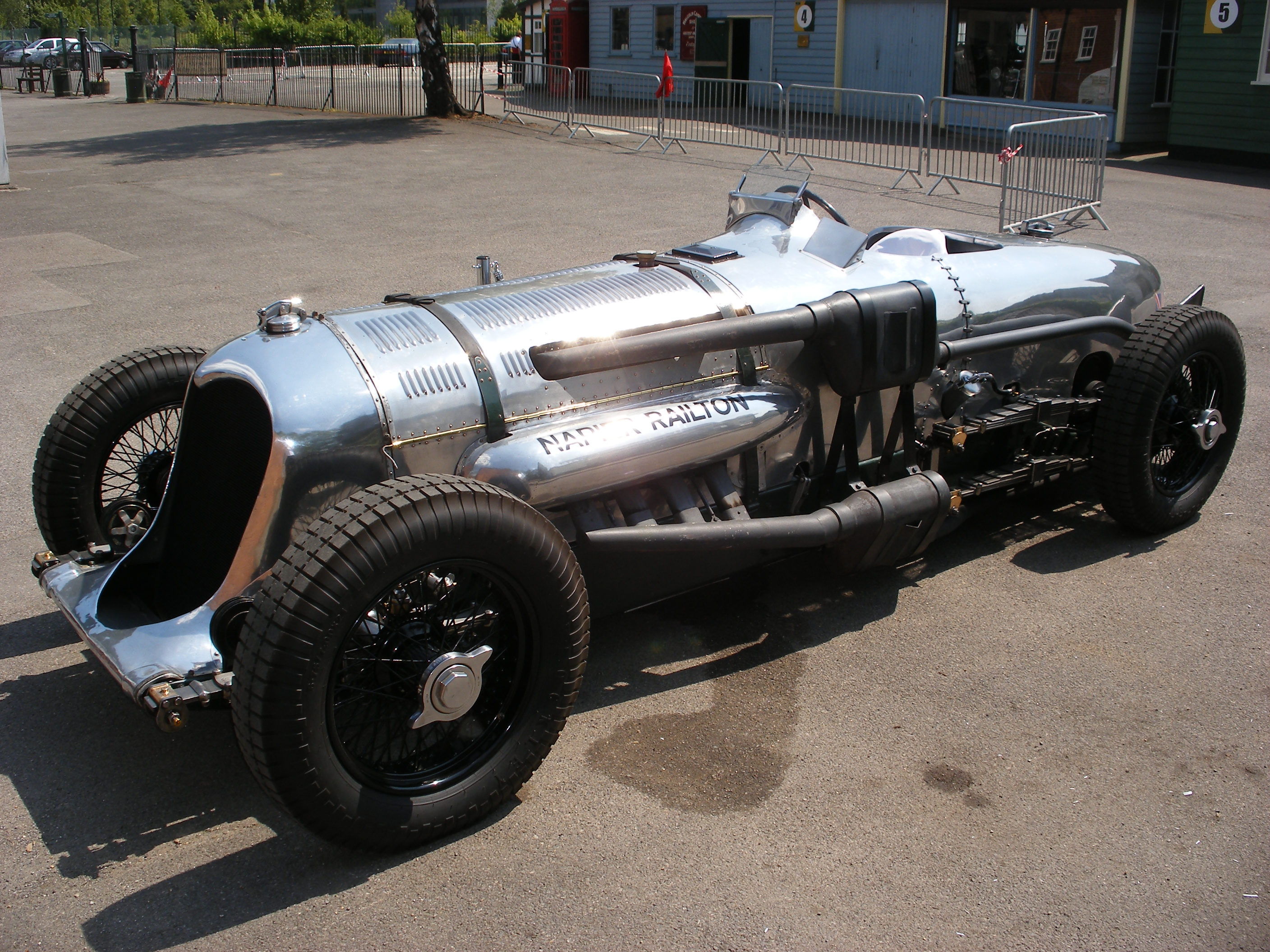
The Napier-Railton at Brooklands

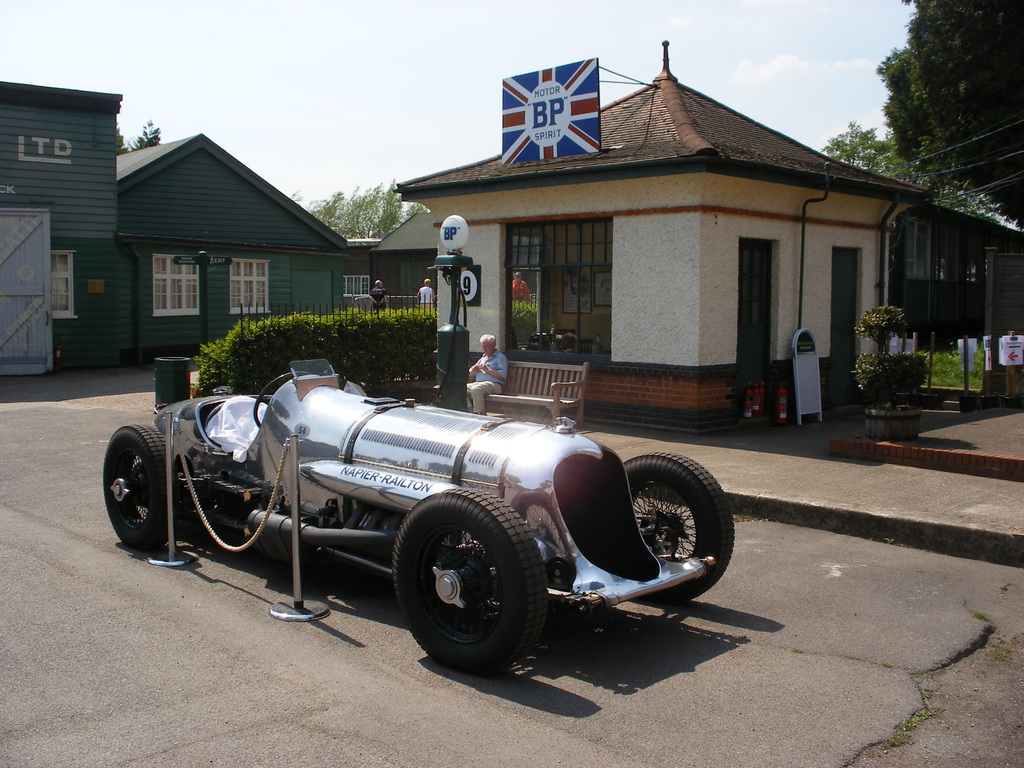
The Napier-Railton at Brooklands

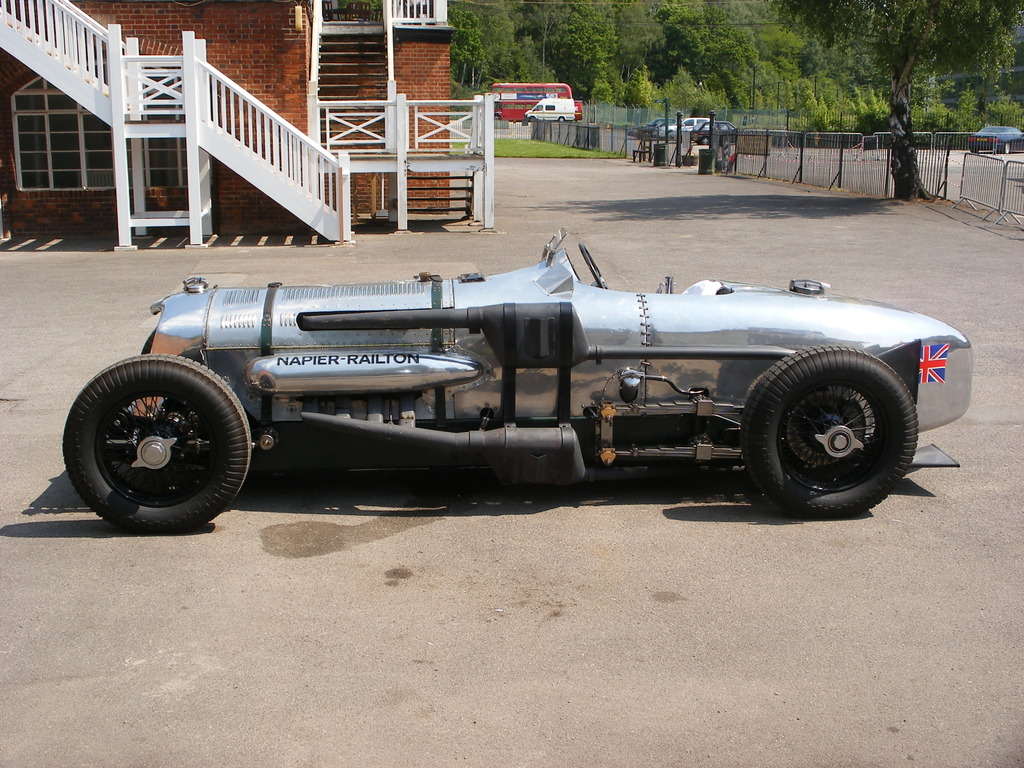
The Napier-Railton at Brooklands

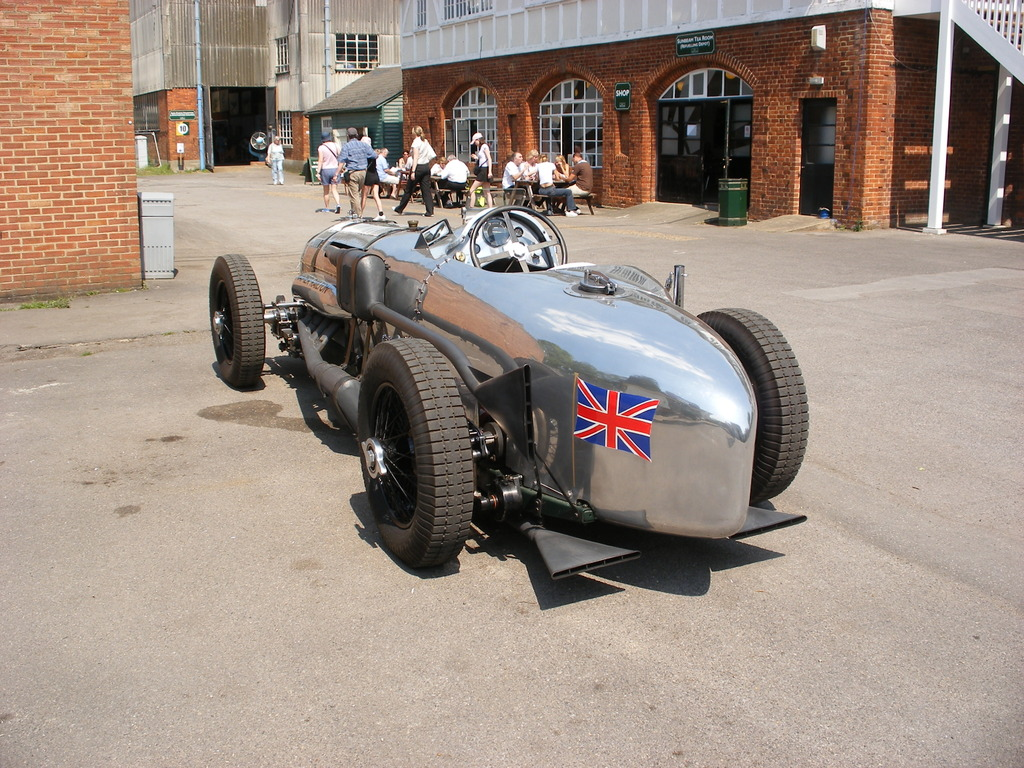
The Napier-Railton at Brooklands

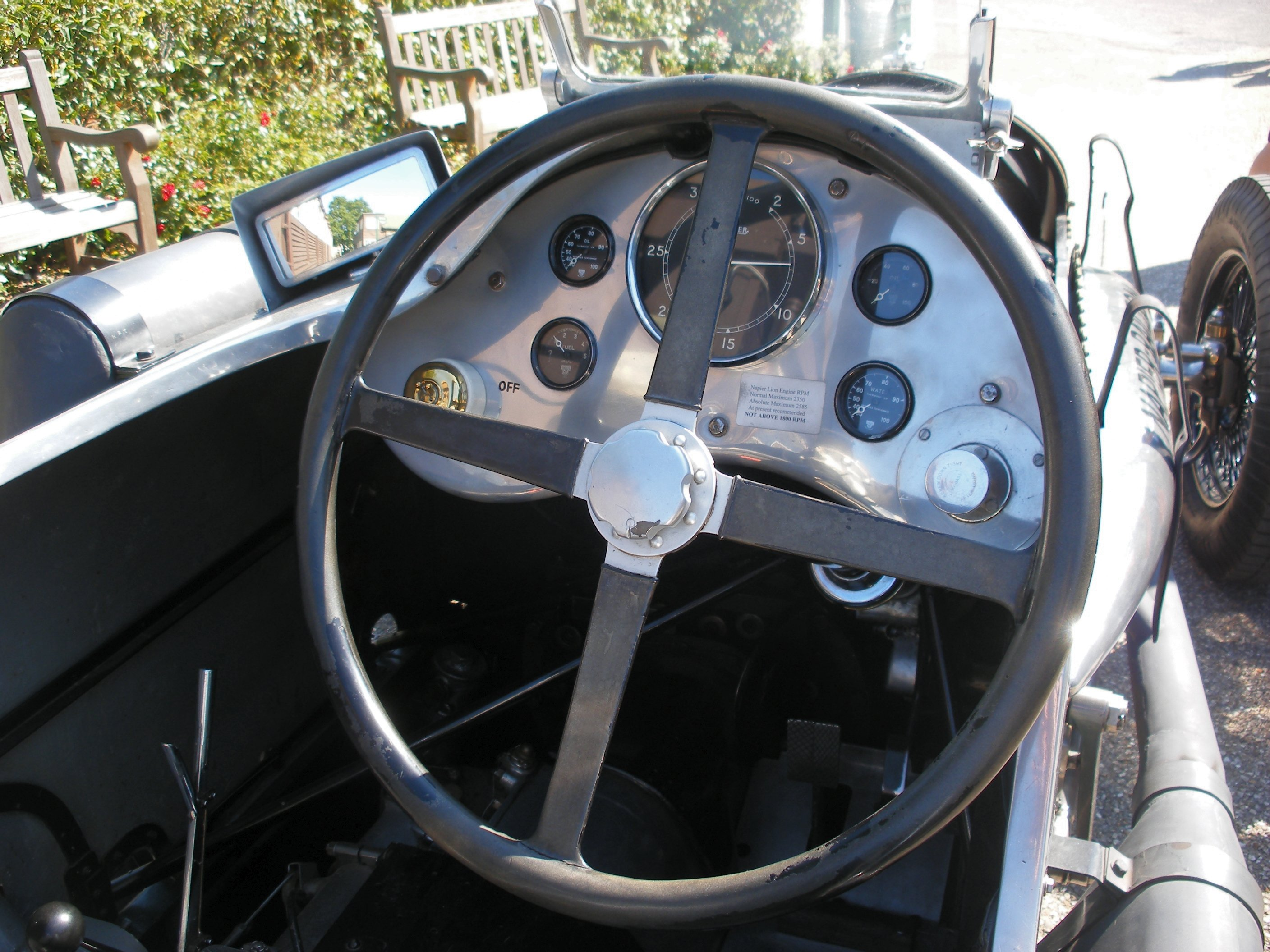
Cockpit/Dash

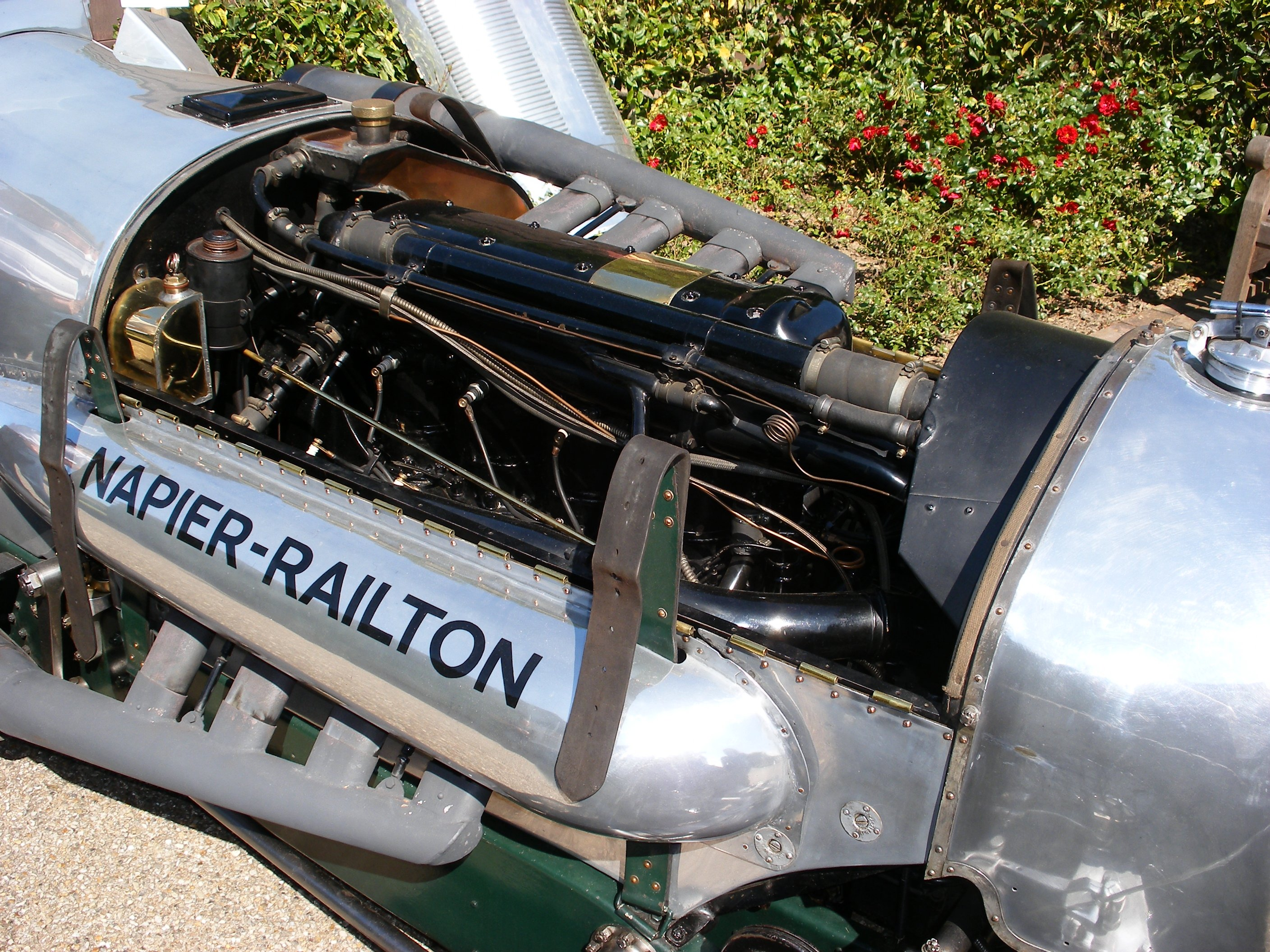
The Napier Lion engine

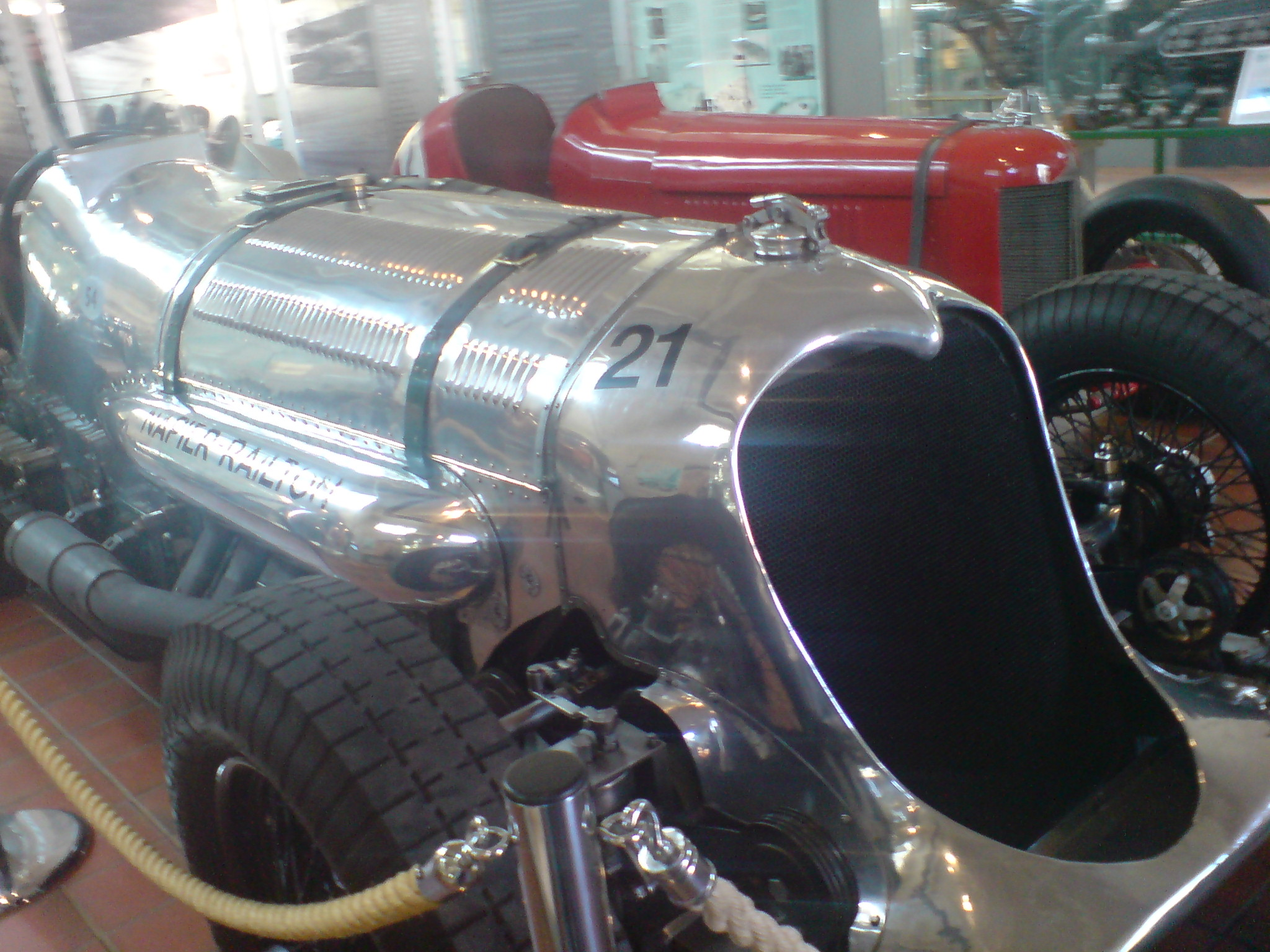
The Napier-Railton at Brooklands
