= Triumph Bandit =

British motorcycle

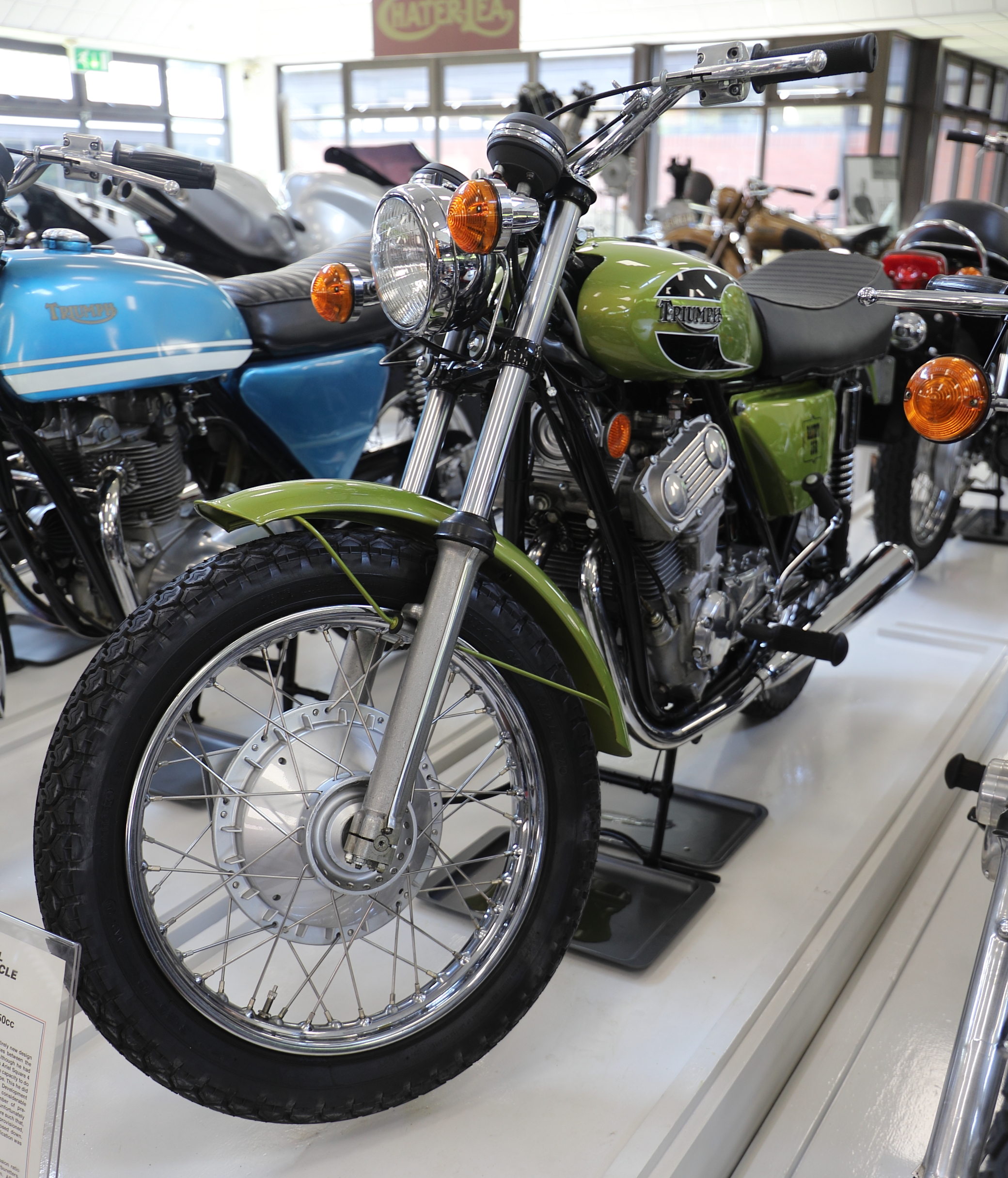
- Triumph Bandit on display at the National Motorcycle Museum
- Manufacturer: Triumph
- Also called: T35R / T35SS
- Parent company: BSA Group
- Production: 1970
- Engine: 349 cc (21.3 cu in) DOHC twin
- Power: 34 hp (25 kW) at 9,000 rpm
- Torque: 21ft.lb at 7000rpm
- Transmission: wet multiplate clutch, five speed manual gearbox
- Wheelbase: 58.625 in (1,489.1 mm)
- Weight: 345 pounds (156 kg) (dry)
- Fuel capacity: 13.5 L (3.0 imp gal; 3.6 US gal)
- Oil capacity: 4 3/4 pints

The Triumph Bandit was a British motorcycle manufactured as a prototype by Triumph in 1970. Originally designed by Edward Turner (who was already retired from Triumph) as his last project it was subsequently substantially modified at Triumph by a greatly critical Bert Hopwood and Doug Hele. Despite their work, the Bandit never went into commercial production, and only five have survived, making them very rare.

Doug Hele stated that the model was dropped because design doubts such as the rapid wear of contact breaker points, did not justify the 'real money' cost of dies for components such as cylinder heads, the company then being in 'real financial trouble'. This was despite the fact that Hele had initially expected full production to follow after twelve pre-production models were made. Indeed, the Bandit was included in the 1971 brochure and publicity photographs taken at Umberslade Hall featuring British speedway rider and Triumph production tester Tony Lomas with British model Carol Cleveland (famous for British TV comedy Monty Python) had already been produced.

Hopwood did note that the production release date was constantly delayed from spring 1971 with even autumn 1972 suggested gravely affecting BSA-Triumph's credibility with dealers especially in the critical US market. It has also been suggested that the model name was to have been Toledo but that had been taken by the Triumph car company and that the Bandit name was intended for the equivalent BSA model instead.

== Description ==
Launched in 1971 the 5-speed, 349 cc (21.3 cu in) double overhead cam twin cylinder Triumph Bandit delivered 34 bhp (25 kW) and could reach 110 mph (180 km/h). Essentially the same motorcycle as the BSA Fury, the Bandit represented the factory's last attempt to compete against Japanese imports.

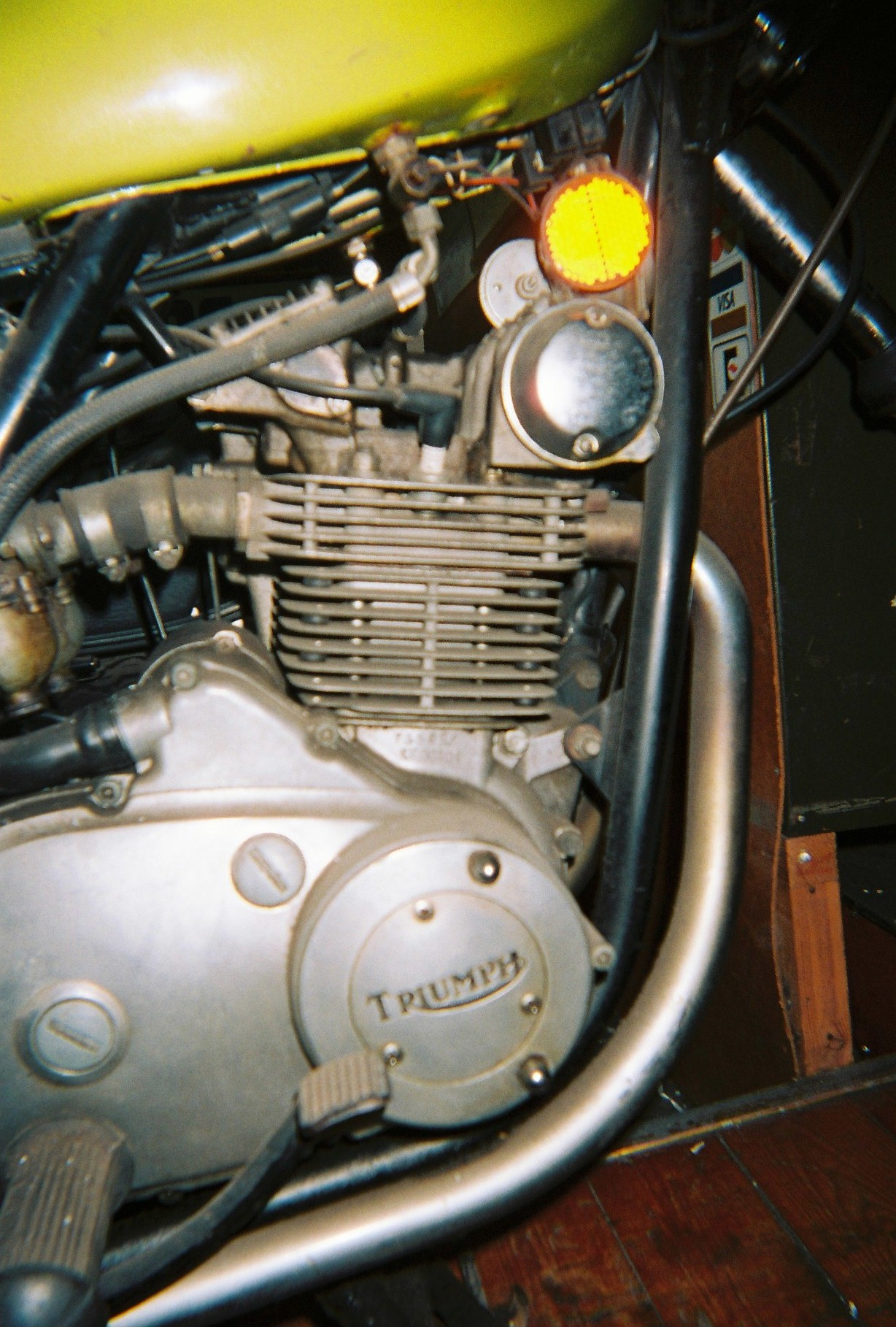
Timing side of 1971 Triumph Bandit engine

The only contemporary road test was by American magazine Cycle Guide in their March 1971 issue upon a visit to the Triumph and BSA factories at Meriden and Small Heath, respectively. The Bandit's petrol tank colour scheme was Cypress Green (although Cycle World identified it as Jealous Green) with white-lined black scallops above and below a metal Triumph badge with a chrome styling strip running down the top of the tank. The same paint scheme applied to the mudguards with a white-lined black stripe running down through their centre. The side panels were silver painted with black 'tombstone' style lettering stating the model name and engine size: 'Bandit 350'.

The engine was all-alloy as opposed to Triumph's other twins that relied upon an iron barrel and considered by Cycle Guide to be 'beautifully finished' and 'a real thing of beauty'. Cycle Guide criticised the retention of a traditionally Triumph vertically split crankcase halves rather than adopting the Japanese practice of horizontally splitting them. Despite this, it was noted that the engine was oil tight. The small diameter instruments and foot pegs thought mounted too far forward came in for criticism as did the poor conical hub rear brake performance, unlike the 'great' front brake. Lever travel between gears was felt to be too long although the clutch operation was 'silky smooth'.

The electrical system was twin coil and 12 volt and an electric starter was offered as an option. Carburetion was by two Amal 27mm carburetors. Cycle Guide were disappointed that the engine could not be expanded beyond 350cc but praised the engine's and exhausts' quietness. Two exhaust systems, a low level ('T35R') and high level (the 'T35SS' Street Scrambler version), were offered, the former offering more top speed. The low level exhaust system was finished in bright chrome, the high level system in matt black with a stainless steel heat shield. The T35SS version also came with what the brochure described as 'detachable electrics'. Tyres for both versions were the same, Dunlop K70; 3.25 x 18 inches for the front and 3.50 x 18 inches for the rear. Compression ratio was also the same for both : 9.5:1.

Overall, the review was extremely positive concluding, the Bandit 'will run at 90 mph (140 km/h) all day long' and Triumph would 'sell all they can crank out in the next 12 months' being 'a lot of machine for the money' (US$900). In the United Kingdom, a retail price of £402 was cited, some £83 less than Triumph's 500 cc (31 cu in) Daytona model and £91 more than their 250 cc (15 cu in) Blazer model.

== Surviving examples ==
There are said to be only five surviving Triumph Bandits and one in full working order is owned by the British Motorcycle Charitable Trust which purchased it from former Meriden worker and Triumph specialist Norman Hyde, who restored the Bandit to its current condition before it was presented to the Coventry Transport Museum. The Chairman of the British Motorcycle Trust, John Kidson, decided it was an important motorcycle that should be kept for posterity, to show to the public what the British motorcycle industry were trying to do when things went wrong for them. This Bandit was entered in the 2008 VMCC’s Festival of 1,000 Bikes at Mallory Park where it was reported to have run very well with smooth power all the way up to an indicated 8,000 rpm, and was a match for many bigger motorcycles, with good handling helped by the shallow steering head angle.

British magazine, The Classic Motorcycle sampled another running example, engine/frame number 00101, (originally owned by Triumph dealers CG Chell, then-owned by sidecar racer Chris Vincent and now at Triumph spares dealers TMS-see photograph) and found it 'an eminently rideable motor cycle', 'imparting a great deal of pleasure as a bonus'. Tellingly, the author found that whilst Triumph 'was well able to design and build a model to match contemporary Japanese designs in engine performance, and to out-handle them on the road', the contact breaker points assembly required replacing during the ride. Testing the same machine some 3 years earlier, British magazine, The Biker commented similarly as to the performance but instead concluded that the Bandit would merely have been an 'also-ran' against the-then Japanese competition.

Other surviving examples of the Bandit are on display at the Sammy Miller Motorcycle Museum and the National Motorcycle Museum with a rare example left outside England being in Australia (owned by enthusiast and racer Doug Fraser.

With no further production, there were a number of redundant Bandit frames left which were used experimentally by Meriden with their existing 650cc and 500cc motors. Although not proceeded with, both Hopwood and Hele appreciated that these experimental machines gave a good power-weight ratio.
