= Gary Gabelich =

American motorsport driver and land speed record holder (1940–1984)

- Born: Gary Michael Gabelich; August 29, 1940; Southern California, U.S.
- Died: January 26, 1984 (aged 43)
- Cause of death: Motorcycle crash
- Occupation: Motorsport driver
- Known for: Land speed record (622.407 mph, 1970)
- Spouse: Rae Marie Ramsey
- Children: 1

Gary Michael Gabelich (Croatian Gabelić; August 29, 1940 – January 26, 1984) was an American motorsport driver who set the Fédération Internationale de l'Automobile (FIA) Land Speed Record (LSR) on October 23, 1970, driving the rocket car Blue Flame at Bonneville Salt Flats near Wendover, Utah.

== Early life ==
Gary Michael Gabelich was born August 29, 1940 and was raised in southern California and attended Long Beach Polytechnic High School. He grew up during the height of the Southern California race scene and became friends with many famous racers of the era, like drag racer Tom McEwen. The nearby Lions Drag Strip was adjacent to Long Beach and he was influenced by the NHRA drag racing legend Big Joe Reath of the Reath Automotive Speed Shop in Long Beach. Gabelich's father was of Croatian American descent and his mother was Mexican American.

Gabelich drove a split-window 1960-era Volkswagen delivery van for Vermillion's Drug store in his younger days. He lived with his parents in the Bixby Knolls area of Long Beach, California during this time.

== Career ==
Gabelich worked for North American Aviation, which became North American Rockwell after a 1967 merger with Rockwell-Standard. He started in the mail room and stayed for nine years in various positions, including staff assistant, before becoming a part-time test subject for Project Apollo in 1968 and 1969. Gabelich served as an Apollo test astronaut in 1968–1969, as stated on the plaque his family dedicated to him in 2001.

Unlike the actual astronauts, Gabelich was not flying the capsules but testing their long-term viability in weightless conditions, their tolerance and performance under extreme lateral forces, and, though they seldom spoke of it on televised moon shots, the toilet facilities. Gabelich had the same measurements as Mercury Seven astronaut Wally Schirra, and he tested capsules and equipment before they were approved for flight.

=== Land speed record ===
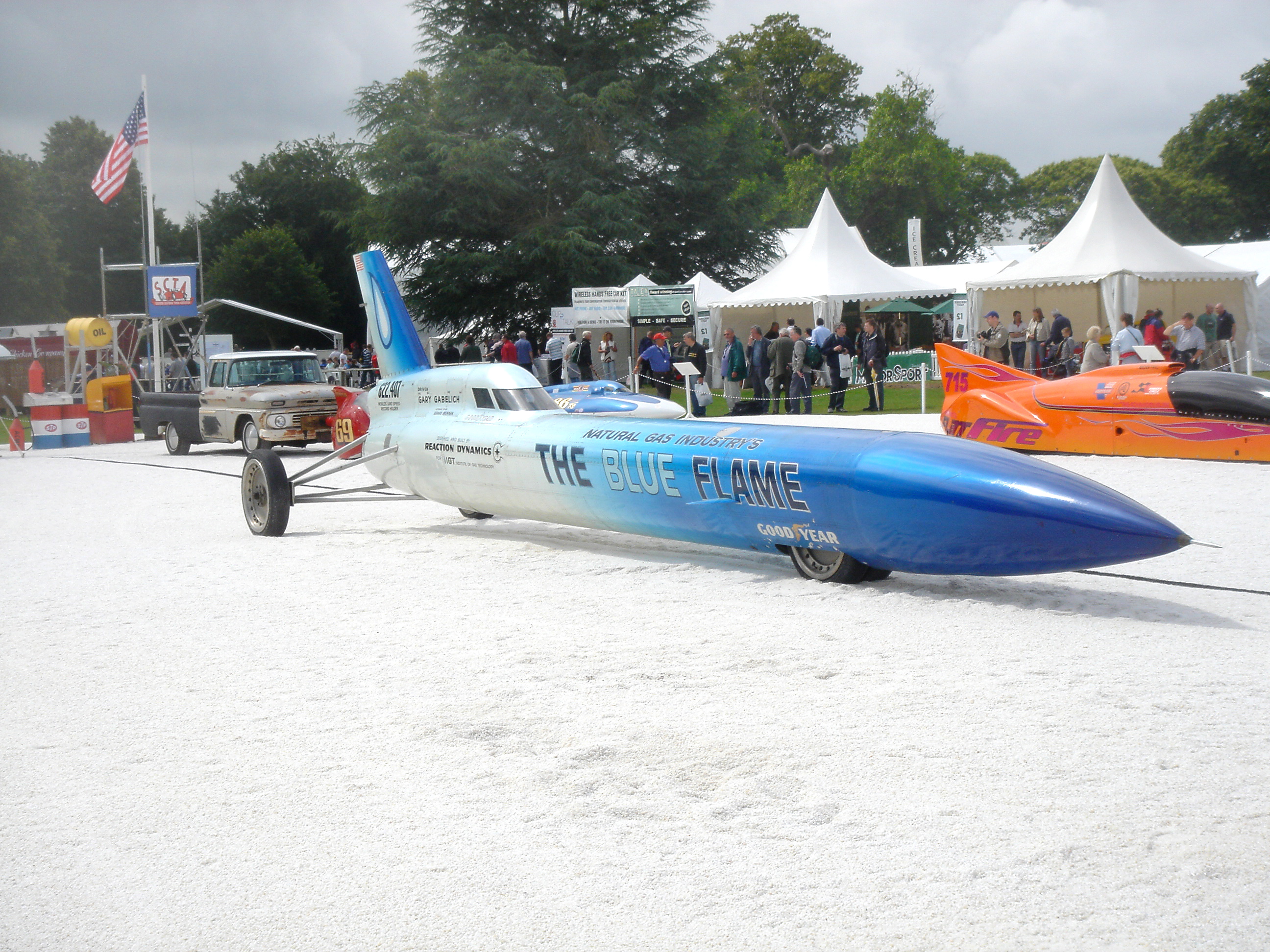
The Blue Flame LSR car in a historical vehicle event.

Gabelich broke the LSR by achieving average speeds of 622.407 mph (1,001.667 km/h) over a flying mile and 630.388 mph (1,014.511 km/h) over a flying kilometer. The thrust used during this attempt was between 13,000 pounds (58,000 newtons) and 15,000 pounds (67,000 newtons). A top speed of approximately 650 mph (1,050 km/h) was momentarily attained during one run.

The FIA rules dictate that a land speed mark is recognized only after two runs through the FIA-measured kilometer and mile courses. The two corresponding speeds are then averaged for the official time and speed. Additionally both runs must be made within one hour.

Gabelich averaged 629.412 mph (1,013 km/h) on his first run and 631.367 mph (1,016 km/h) on his second run for an average speed of 630.388 mph (1,015 km/h) establishing a new kilometer FIA LSR. The mile FIA LSR was the first exceeding 1,000 km/h (621 mph) and remained unbeaten until 1983, when Richard Noble broke it driving Thrust 2. The faster-than-kilometer FIA LSR remained unbroken for 27 years until ThrustSSC went supersonic in 1997.

=== Racing career ===
Gabelich's racing career began early in the Southern California drag scene. In the early 1960s, he drove Bill Fredericks' jet car Valkyrie.

On September 14, 1969, Gabelich established a quarter-mile Drag boat record of 200.44 mph (323 km/h), driving a boat named Crisis at Perris, California. This is not the same as the Union Internationale Motonautique (UIM) Water Speed Record (WSR) in which Donald Campbell broke 200 mph (322 km/h) on July 23, 1955 in the Bluebird K7.

After setting the LSR, Gabelich was slated to drive Courage of Australia, a compact rocket dragster built by Fredericks in Chatsworth, California, intended as a stepping stone to a full-sized LSR car. His manager, Bob Kachler, organized a proposed "Race of the Century" at Bonneville Salt Flats between Courage of Australia and Craig Breedlove's Sonic II, with a half-million-dollar prize to be funded by television rights. Neither car had been built yet. Nothing came of the plan.

Gabelich was seriously injured in the crash of an experimental 4 wheel drive Funny Car in 1972 that careened out of control at 180 mph (290 km/h) during a quarter mile run almost severing his left forearm and broke his left leg so severely that more than a year later he still wore a cast. This incident ended his racing career, and he never raced again, concentrating instead on a new supersonic vehicle.

== After racing ==
In the early 1980s, he established the "Rocketman Corporation" with Tom Daniel. The objective was to design and build a vehicle capable of reaching speeds in the 800 mph (1,287 km/h) range. This conceptual vehicle was named "American Way", but the project was cut short by his death in January 1984 in a motorcycle crash.

Gabelich appeared in the 1977 movie Joyride to Nowhere and made the 1971 documentary One Second from Eternity: The History of the Land Speed Record. Gabelich and his family appeared on Family Feud with Richard Dawson, where he presented the key to the city of Long Beach, California to Dawson.

== Recognition ==
In 2008, Gabelich was inducted into the Long Beach Motorsports Walk of Fame in front of the Convention Center on Pine Avenue. He was represented at the ceremony by his wife Rae, a Long Beach City Councilwoman who retired in 2012 after eight years of service.

Gabelich was inducted into the Motorsports Hall of Fame of America in 2016.

== Personal life ==
Gabelich married Rae Marie Ramsey (born 1946). She graduated from Palo Alto High School Palo Alto, CA in 1964 and moved to Long Beach in 1968. Guy Michael Gabelich was born in the early 1980s. She was a flight attendant for United Airlines.

Gabelich died in January 1984 in a motorcycle crash. After his widow, Rae Marie, retired from United Airlines in 2003, she was elected to the Long Beach City Council in 2004, where she served for eight years.
