= Enfield 8000 =

British battery-electric city car

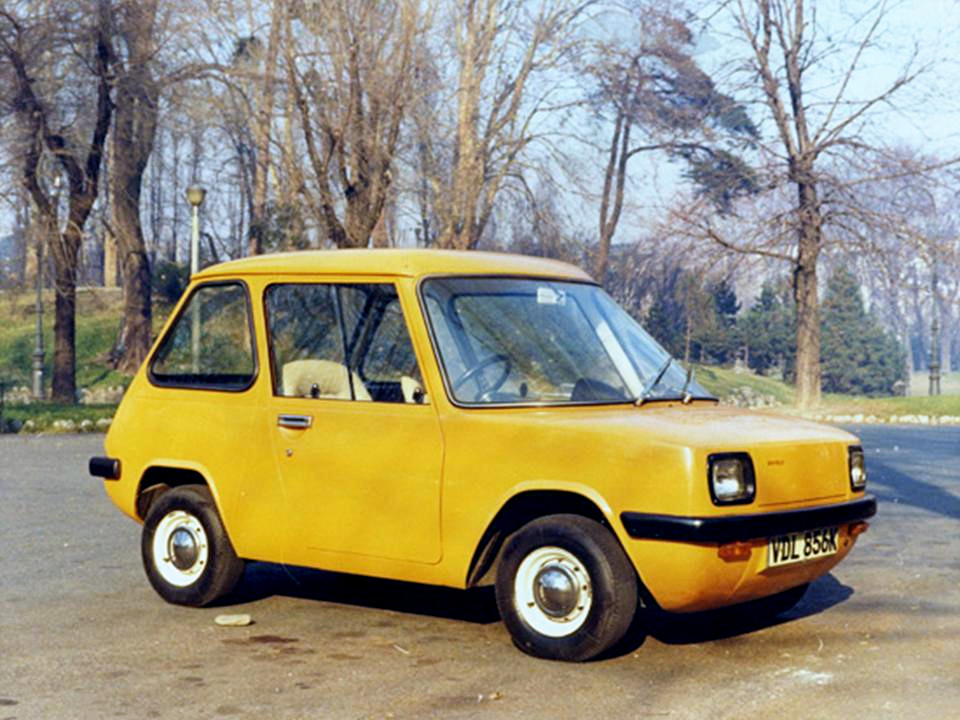
Enfield 8000 in Hyde Park

The Enfield 8000 is a two-seater battery-electric city car, introduced in 1973 and developed in the United Kingdom by Isle of Wight company Enfield Automotive, owned by Greek millionaire Giannis Goulandris. The car was designed by a group of Greek and British engineers headed by Constantine Adraktas (Chairman and Managing Technical Director of Enfield) with John Ackroyd as project designer, who later went on to the Thrust 2 project. The prototypes and initial production were built at the Somerton Works in Northwood, near Cowes.

Immediately after its introduction, production was moved to the Greek island of Syros. 120 cars were built in total, of which 65 were used by the Electricity Council and electricity boards in the south of England.

Powered by an 8 bhp (6 kW) electric motor and lead-acid batteries, the car has a top speed of around 48 mph (77 km/h) and a range of around 40 miles (64 km). In Autocar's test in 1975 they found it had a usable range of 25 miles (40 km). It could accelerate from 0 to 10 mph (16 km/h) in 1.6 seconds, 20 mph (32 km/h) in 4.7 seconds and 30 mph (48 km/h) in 15.7 seconds. Brakes are by drums front and back.

It has a ladder-type square section tube chassis frame with aluminium alloy body panels stretched over steel frames. It uses suspension parts from the Hillman Imp, doors were adapted from the Mini and a rear axle derived from Reliant three-wheelers.

== Neorion ==
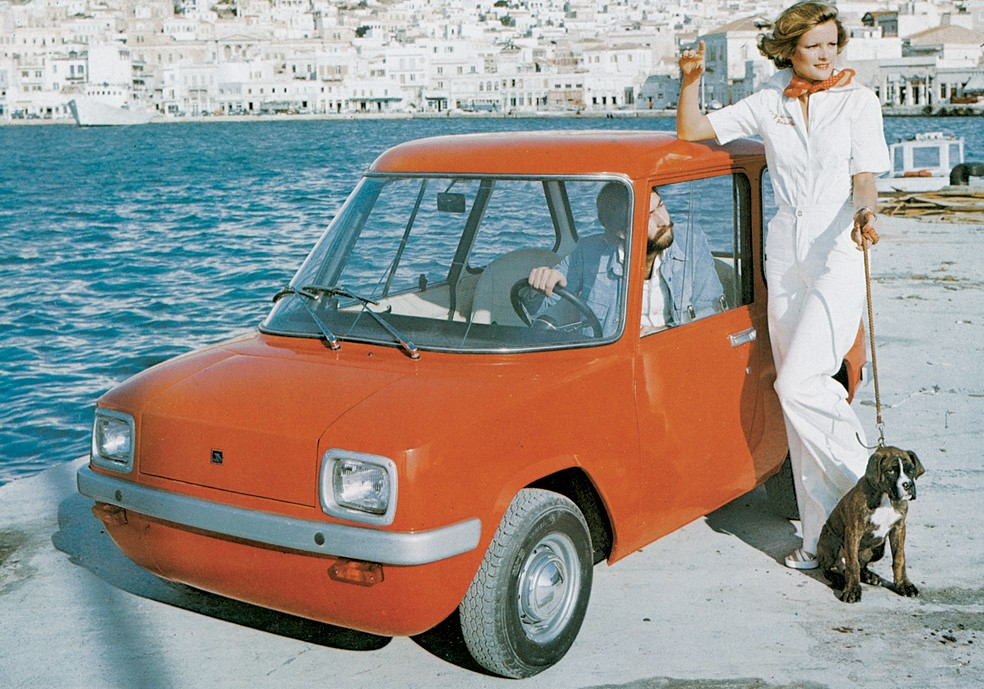
Greek-built Enfield-Neorion 8000

The company had been incorporated into the Greek Neorion company, also owned by Goulandris, and production was transferred to Syros, the company having transformed into a new Greek company, Enfield-Neorion, headquartered in Piraeus. There have been many arguments regarding the reason why Goulandris decided to produce the car in Greece, including conspiracy theories. Thanos Lebesis, then General Manager of Enfield-Neorion, argued that Goulandris had thought that "the company was owned by Greeks, the car was designed by Greeks, so it should also be produced by Greeks". However, it could not be legally sold in Greece due to tax categorization issues connected with electric power, so production was exported to the United Kingdom. Enfield-Neorion developments included a "Jeep" version aiming at the rent-a-car market in the Greek islands, but none could be sold locally.

== "Flux Capacitor" ==
A highly customised Enfield 8000 named "Jonny's Flux Capacitor" was converted by Jonny Smith into a street-legal electric drag racer. which for a time claimed to be the world's fastest street legal electric vehicle.

== See also ==
- List of modern production plug-in electric vehicles
- Scottish Aviation Scamp
