= Scottish Aviation Scamp =

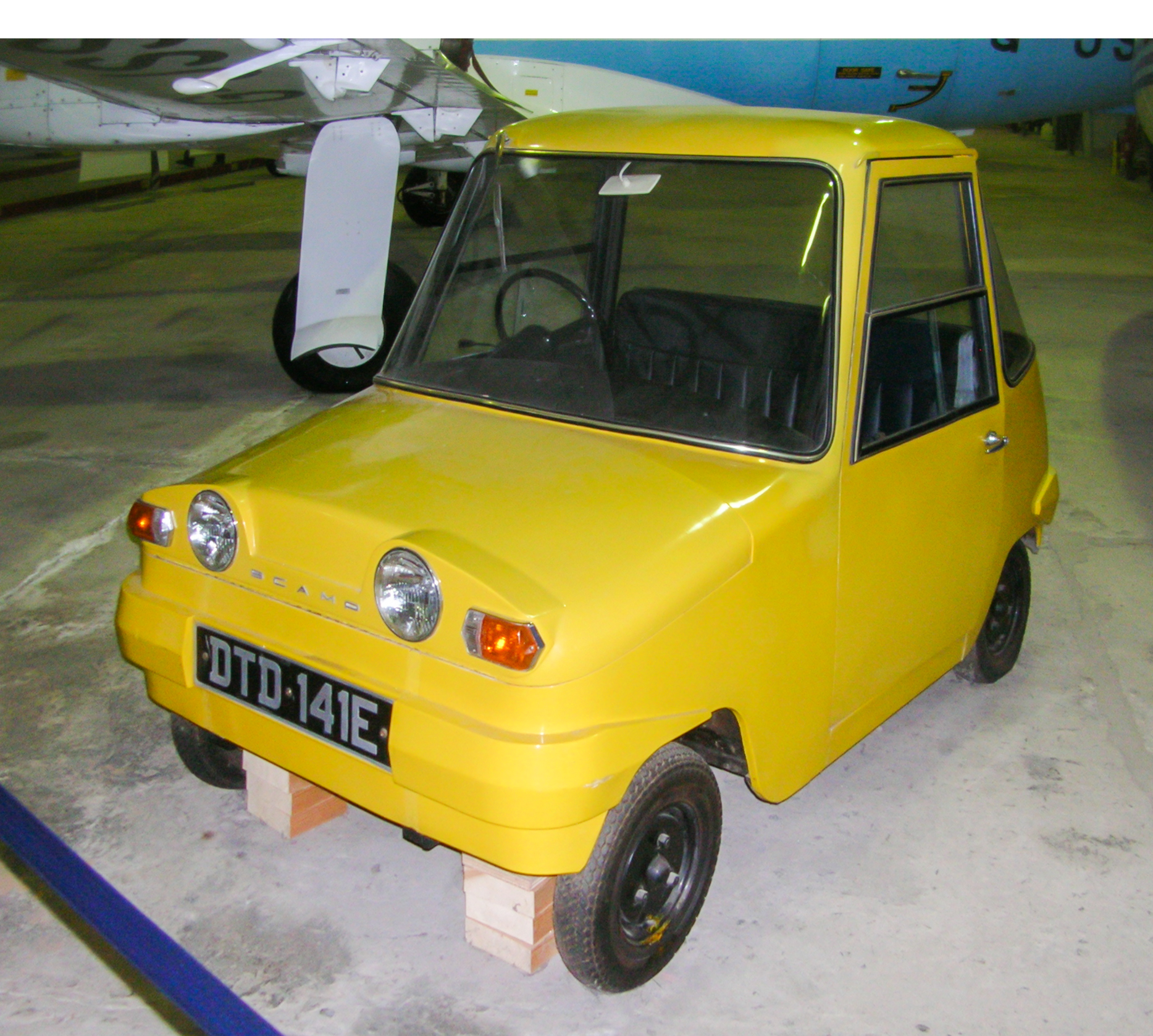

Overview
- Manufacturer: Scottish Aviation
- Production: 1965 12 units
- Designer: Dr. W.G. Watson

Body and chassis
- Body style: Microcar
- Layout: Rear-wheel drive

Powertrain
- Engine: 4 48-volt batteries 2 electric motors

Dimensions
- Length: 84 in (2,134 mm)
- Width: 46 in (1,168 mm)

The Scottish Aviation Scamp is a small concept electric city car that was designed between 1964 and 1966 by Scottish Aviation. The name was chosen as a contraction of SCottish (from Scottish Aviation) and AMP (for electric current).

== Concept ==
The Scamp was developed by the Project Department of Scottish Aviation as a small, two-seater urban commuter vehicle. The department had been thinking about electric vehicles, inspired by the battery-powered tugs used to move baggage trucks at Prestwick Airport. These were plugged into charger in the basement of the airport terminal in between jobs. It was considered sensible that an electric car could be recharged where it would be expected to park, i.e. at the owner's home, with a recharge time of 8 hours overnight considered reasonable. The head of the department, Gordon Watson, was at the railway station in his home town when a commuter train was due in. He observed wives waiting in cars in the car park to take their husbands on the short journey home. He realised the husbands would benefit from having their own car dedicated to the 'station run', for which a small, cheap vehicle would be ideal, with performance, comfort and a wide range of uses not being important for such a specific short purpose. This led to Scottish Aviation's concept of an electric car. It would be the second car in a household. It would probably be used by only one member of that household to undertake, probably on a daily basis, a specific, known journey or pattern of journeys, after which it would be at home and could be completely recharged overnight from a standard 13 amp domestic socket. A few quick calculations showed that the electricity cost would be better than 150 miles (240 kilometres) per gallon. The specification that emerged was:

- It would be powered by batteries which could be fully re-charged from a domestic supply in 8 hours.
- It would be very small, very manoeuvrable, and therefore easily parked.
- It would seat two adults, or one adult and two small children, plus some hand luggage or shopping.
- It should be capable of keeping up with urban traffic, with a maximum speed of 35 mph (56 km/h) and acceleration of 0-30 mph (48 km/h) in under 12 seconds.
- It should be capable of re-starting, laden, on a 1 in 4 incline.
- It should have a range, on fully charged batteries, of at least 25 miles (40 km). It was understood that this seemed a small figure but research had indicated that it would be possible to commute from any suburb to the city centre even in the case of large city like Glasgow. In addition, the kind of rural areas where commuters might travel from invariably had their own railway station and schools within that same radius.

As a result, it was clear that if the 8 hour re-charging requirement could produce a reliable range of 25 miles (40 km), Scottish Aviation should concentrate on making the car cheap and not on increasing the range or performance.

== Development ==
The original design study was followed in early 1965 by the construction of a test vehicle. It was originally not much more than a seat on a chassis and became known as "the farm cart" in the factory. This vehicle demonstrated that the theoretical calculations in the design study were correct. It was capable of a top speed of 36 mph (58 km/h) and an acceleration of 0-30 mph (48 km/h) in 10.5 seconds. In simulated urban conditions of six stops and starts per mile (1.6 km), it achieved a range of 18 miles (29 km) between charges, against an original target of 15 miles (24 km). With a constant throttle setting, the range increased to 26 miles (42 km).

In late July 1965, Scottish Aviation approached the Central Electricity Generating Board as a result of being happy with the progress that was being made. The aim was to market the Scamp through the area electricity boards' regional showrooms. This approach was followed by visits to Scottish Aviation at Prestwick by senior personnel from the Electricity Council and the South West Electricity Board, who were sufficiently impressed to equip "the farm cart" with a wooden, light metal alloy and Perspex body and register it for use on the road as DAG 908C. This would allow it to be demonstrated at the Bristol headquarters of the SWEB, and in London. The tour finished with a press conference about electric cars at which the Scamp was driven by Stirling Moss. This generated almost 200 enquiries from prospective customers and distributors around the world.

Encouraged by this reception, Scottish Aviation manufactured a batch of 12 pre-production Scamps to be used for further development and market studies. The first of these left Prestwick at the end of February 1967 to be the centrepiece of the Electricity Council stand at the Ideal Home Exhibition.

== Testing and cancellation ==
Scottish Aviation had not set out to revolutionise the motor industry, but had produced an unconventional car which was evaluated against conventional standards. The Electricity Council submitted two vehicles to the Motor Industry Research Association for testing. Car 13A 0004 was evaluated in 1967, and the following year car 13A 0003 was given an endurance test.

The evaluation of the Scamp in 1967 noted the following:

During the examination and use of this vehicle, several features that justify a brief mention became noticeable. Although it was not intended to make an exhaustive criticism of the design of the vehicle, a few of the points that arose were considered to be of interest.

The 0.62 inch diameter knobs used internally for latches and covers were inconvenient and flimsy. The demister slots were crude and quite inadequate for the size of windscreen. The total space provided for luggage, shopping, oddments etc, seemed to be the two open boxes flanking the rear battery. The cover for this battery was inadequately located. The hole to which it gave access provided for topping up the cells but was just too small for access to the terminals. The door providing access to the charging socket was so small that making the connection properly was difficult. The spring loading of this door had weakened considerably after a few charging periods. When the charger was connected, there was no interlock to prevent the vehicle being driven away with the connection still in place. It was not easy to tell from within the car whether the control was positioned for Forward, Off or Reverse and it was therefore easy to leave it parked in any one of these three positions. The drive chains and sprockets were usually unprotected from loose stones and weather effects, the chains were showing signs of wear after only 200 miles (320 km). The rear battery retaining strap and bolts were already modified for assembly reasons, but were replaced by more suitable items when they proved to be unsatisfactory. One road wheel was replaced by the spare when it cracked after 56 miles (90 km) of running; it was felt that a standard wheel could have been bought to suit this application. One electric motor failure occurred with accelerating away from a standstill and another similar failure occurred during the first attempt to carry out a brake fade test - again when trying to obtain maximum acceleration from rest.

The opportunity was taken during the test period to drive the car over a variety of different road surface. On all but the smoothest of surfaces, considerable pitching movements occurred at all road speeds, becoming more noticeable at speeds above 25 mph (40 km/h) … steering properties were adequate on dry, smooth surfaced roads. In wet conditions, the ride was unchanged and the handling within the limited vehicle performance remained acceptable; however the shortcomings of the steering system made it possible for a slide to be initiated and it was difficult to regain control.

When normal road hazards were encountered, both ride and handling deteriorated sharply and the lack of adequate suspension damping at the front was made obvious. Pot-holes, raised or sunken drain covers, broken road edges, lateral ridges and railway level crossings all gave rise to crashing noises from the suspension while the occupants were unseated and the vehicle was, all too often, deflected from its chosen path. Negotiation of bends with adverse cambers revealed a tendency to travel straight on. On a bend with a corrugated surface, the vehicle hopped towards the outside of the bend and considerable internal noise was generated. It should be added that these hazards were negotiated at 30 mph (48 km/h) - 35 mph (56 km/h). the maximum speed available, whereas experience has shown that most vehicles can achieve at least 40 mph (64 km/h) before attracting serious adverse comment and can be driven faster still.

The endurance test report, produced on 1 October 1968, noted the following faults at the stated distances on the test track:

- 15 miles (24 km) A crack had developed at the top of the left side windscreen pillar. The contact-plates for the front bump rubbers were bent and the front tyres had been making contact with the top of the wheel arches. The right side retaining bolt for the front battery frame could not be unscrewed as the nut was no longer captive; it was necessary to remove the forward-and-reverse switch slide to obtain access to the nut.
- 32 miles (51 km) The front tyres were showing an extremely high rate of wear and adjustments were made. The steering drop arm position was altered, the adjuster screw was taken up by four turns and a more tightly fitting pin was made for the joint between the steering box input shaft and the universal joint. The free play at the steering wheel was thus reduced to one inch and, in addition, the toe-in was altered to the recommended 0.06 inch.
- 36 miles (58 km) Both front wheel rims were showing signs of bending and buckling.
- 87 miles (140 km) When running in wet conditions, the driver's floor became flooded to a depth of one inch and the passenger's floor was also very wet. Water was swilling around under the saturated seat cushion. Some of the water was entering at the lower door hinge positions. In all conditions the driver complained that his knee was being bruised by the door handle and that the safety harness persistently slipped off his shoulder. The cracks behind the rear door openings were developing. The speedometer drive cable from the left side motor had dropped and was touching the ground; suitable adjustments were made to the angle of the elbow. The captive nut for the right side battery frame bolt was replaced by a tapped plate and wedge. The right front wheel rim had collapse and the tyre was deflated; a new wheel and tyre were fitted.
- 144 miles (232 km) The left front wheel rim was badly buckled allowing the tyre to deflate; a new wheel and tyre were fitted
- 154 miles (248 km) After the speedometer had stopped working, the controller cut in and out at random until the car stopped altogether with a burning smell. The ends of the broken speedometer cable had made contact with the solenoid wires and the whole lot had finally fused onto the earthed outer cable.
- 167 miles (269 km) The right front wheel cracked near the valve orifice and was replaced, complete with a new tyre.
- 193 miles (311 km) Although the rim of the right front wheel was only slightly buckled, the tyre persistently deflated; a new wheel and tyre were fitted.
- 224 miles (360 km) When driven in heavy rain, the demister was unable to prevent fogging of the screen and windows, but when the driver's window was opened to help, his right side was subjected to splashes and a strong draught. Flooding of the footwells and seat base also occurred.
- 330 miles (530 km) The body had settled to be 0.5 inch lower all round; the front springs had now taken up a reverse camber and it was thought that the rear springs had also weakened. A new speedometer drive cable was fitted.
- 340 miles (550 km) A taper pin for the steering universal joint was supplied and fitted by a representative from Scottish Aviation Ltd. There was no noticeable improvement in the steering. A piece broke off of the front of the bottom leaf of the right front spring.
- 399 miles (642 km) There has been a gradual increase in pitch and bounce, together with some deterioration in the steering. It was found that the kingpins were worn and that the left front wheel bearings needed adjustment, which was carried out.
- 437 miles (703 km) All four tyres were now worn smooth and the two front wheel rims were buckled; all four were replaced.
- 481 miles (774 km) The rear compartment door flew open and the spare wheel fell out.
- 523 miles (842 km) The top of the dash panel was completely loose and it was found that the fixing screws had pulled out of the wood.
- 558 miles (898 km) Both front tyres were smooth and the rear tyres had 1 mm of tread left; all four were changed. It was thought that the deepest pot hole on the circuit might be causing most of the rim damage, so this was avoided after this mileage.
- 680 miles (1,090 km) The right rear damper/spring unit was now noticeably weak.
- 707 miles (1,138 km) The left damper/spring unit had also deteriorated badly and both units were changed. The front tyres were bald and the wheel rims buckled, while the rear tyres were down to 1 mm tread depth. When left standing, the right front tyre deflated and another wheel and tyre were fitted.
- 738 miles (1,188 km) The steering suddenly became dangerously indefinite. The right front spring and broken three leaves and the bottom leaf of the left front spring had broken. The rear ball joint of the steering drag link had been hitting the vertical woodwork of the structure and the link was bent. When the steering wheel was turned, the steering box moved up and down 0.4 inch and it was found that the steering box mounting bracket was badly cracked. The bracket, drag link and front springs were replaced by new units, the bracket being of more robust construction than the original. This dangerous steering failure would normally be considered by MIRA to constitute a failed test, but consultation showed the desirability of continuing the test.
- 751 miles (1,209 km) The right side demister nozzle broke off at a glued joint.
- 766 miles (1,233 km) The rear battery compartment lock failed and string was used as a temporary measure. The rear battery clamping bolts were bent and both rear damper/spring units were squeaking.
- 820 miles (1,320 km) The left front tyre was worn through the canvas and a new wheel and tyre were fitted.
- 842 miles (1,355 km) The right front wheel rim was bent and the tyre was deflated; both were replaced.
- 941 miles (1,514 km) The rear battery compartment lock was repaired and re-fitted.
- 979 miles (1,576 km) The track rod broke at the adjustment sleeve lock nut. The longer portion dropped to the ground and the car came to an abrupt halt. This failure would also constitute a failed test to MIRA, but there was still a determination to complete 1,000 miles (1,600 km) if at all possible and a jury-rig repair was made. As only 21 miles (34 km) remained to be completed, sufficient strength was provided but no attempt was made to ensure perfect steering geometry.
- 994 miles (1,600 km) Both front tyres were worn down to the canvas and both burst. New wheels and tyres were fitted. The rear tyres were also smooth but were allowed to continue.
- 1,001 miles (1,611 km) A final examination of the exterior of the car revealed the following: The reinforced glass fibre structure showed minor surface cracks and crazing around the front licence plate plinth and below the windscreen. The cracks at the top and bottom of the windscreen pillars were noticeably wider, particularly at the top left. There were also cracks at the top rear corners of the door openings and below the front lower corner of the left door opening. The right door, in particular, had dropped on its hinges, but could still be pulled into line by its latch although sometimes reluctant to open or close. The replacement steering box mounting bracket was apparently still sound, but the replacement drag link had bent as before, both front wheel arches were heavily marked by tyre contact and the bump stop contact plates were bent. Both driving chains were slack but still in position on their sprockets. Both rear damper/spring units were noisy in operation. It should be added that all the tyre deflations were not caused by damaged rims; some new tyres lost pressure wholly or partly when on unused rims, either inexplicably or from the mildest loads. The sealing was regarded as dangerously marginal. On more than one occasion, the driver found it necessary to take evasive action when suddenly seeing an animate or inanimate object on the road surface; the steering characteristics were such that he was unable to cope with the resultant behaviour of the vehicle, despite his experience with it, before he had left the circuit altogether.

The testing by MIRA damaged the suspension and there were other issues with the vehicle. Scottish Aviation asked to examine the problems and propose modification. However, the Electricity Council replied that the scamp was "unfit for purpose" and that the council was no longer interested in the project, were returning the vehicles and requested a meeting with the Commercial Department of Scottish Aviation in order to nullify the contract.

One of the other problems with the Scamp was caused by issues with the battery. Lucas Industries configured several sets of special development batteries, but the life of these proved to be limited to around 12 months, rather than the planned 18 months, before they could not longer be re-charged and had to be replaced. Lucas were confident they could develop a battery with the required life, but this would have cost more than the available resources for the project. Scottish Aviation terminated work on the Scamp project in 1968, but did seek interest from other companies to continue it, with interest from Reliant Motors and Rootes Group. Two of the pre-production vehicles were bought by battery manufacturers in England and Finland and two more were used by the Progress Department of Scottish Aviatio and by Scottish Express at Prestwick Airport.

== Survivors ==
Of the 13 vehicles built (1 prototype, 12 pre-production), only 5 are believed to survive:

Scamp LHT 149E at Alexandria in 2020

- Scamp, registration DTD 141E, painted yellow. This was part of the National Motor Museum collection until sold in 1995 to National Museums Scotland. It was displayed for several years at the National Museum of Flight until moving in 2012 to the National Museums Collection Centre at Granton in Edinburgh.
- Scamp, registration LHT 147E, painted red, previously on display at Myreton Motor Museum, now displayed at Dundee Museum of Transport.
- Scamp, registration LHT 149E, painted light blue, held by the Grampian Transport Museum, formerly the Scottish Motor Museum Trust in the entrance hall of Loch Lomond Factory Outlets.
- Scamp, registration LHT 150E, painted white, in private ownership.
- Scamp, registration OSD 697H, painted white, in private ownership.

== See also ==
- Enfield 8000
