= Stan Barrett =

American racing driver and stuntman

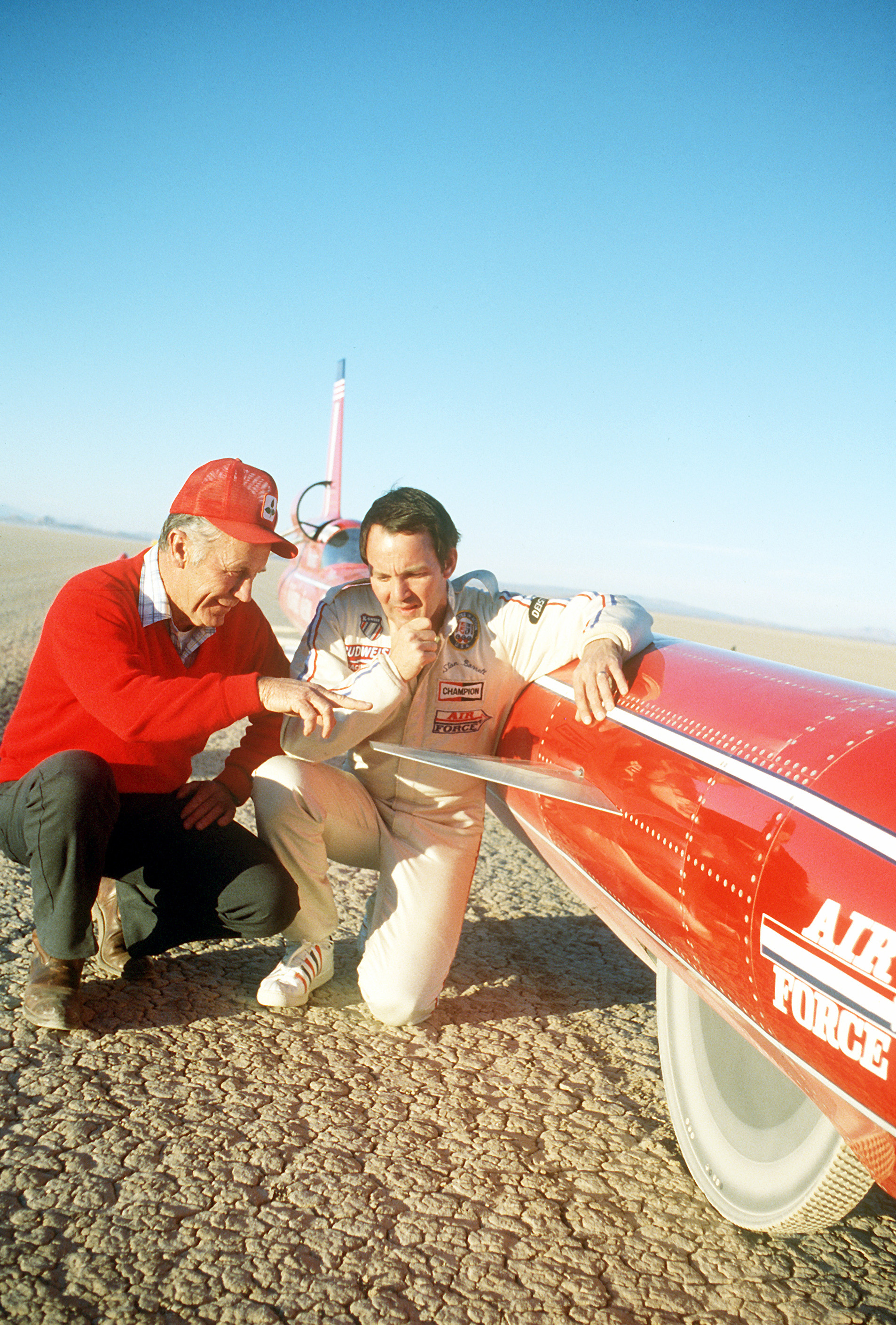
- Barrett (right) with Chuck Yeager
- Born: June 26, 1943 (age 83); St. Louis, Missouri, U.S.
- Height: 5 ft 9 in (175 cm)
- Weight: 145 lb (66 kg)

NASCAR Cup Series career
- 19 races run over 5 years
- Best finish: 38th (1981)
- First race: 1980 American 500 (North Carolina)
- Last race: 1990 Banquet Frozen Foods 300 (Sears Point)
Wins	Top tens	Poles
0	2	0

NASCAR O'Reilly Auto Parts Series career
- 2 races run over 1 year
- Best finish: 116th (2008)
- First race: 2008 NAPA Auto Parts 200 (Montreal)
- Last race: 2008 Zippo 200 at the Glen (Watkins Glen)
Wins	Top tens	Poles
0	0	0

Stan Barrett (born June 26, 1943) is an American Hollywood stuntman, stunt coordinator actor, and former stock car racing driver. His biggest act was however outside the movie world. On December 17, 1979, he attempted to break the land speed record, and the sound barrier in the Budweiser Rocket rocket-powered three-wheel vehicle. His calculated speed was 739.666 miles per hour, (Mach 1.01), which would have made Barrett the first man to break the sound barrier in a land vehicle. The attempt was surrounded by controversy and the speed was never officially recorded. Barrett also raced in 19 Winston Cup Series races between 1980 and 1990, posting two top ten finishes.

== Land speed record ==
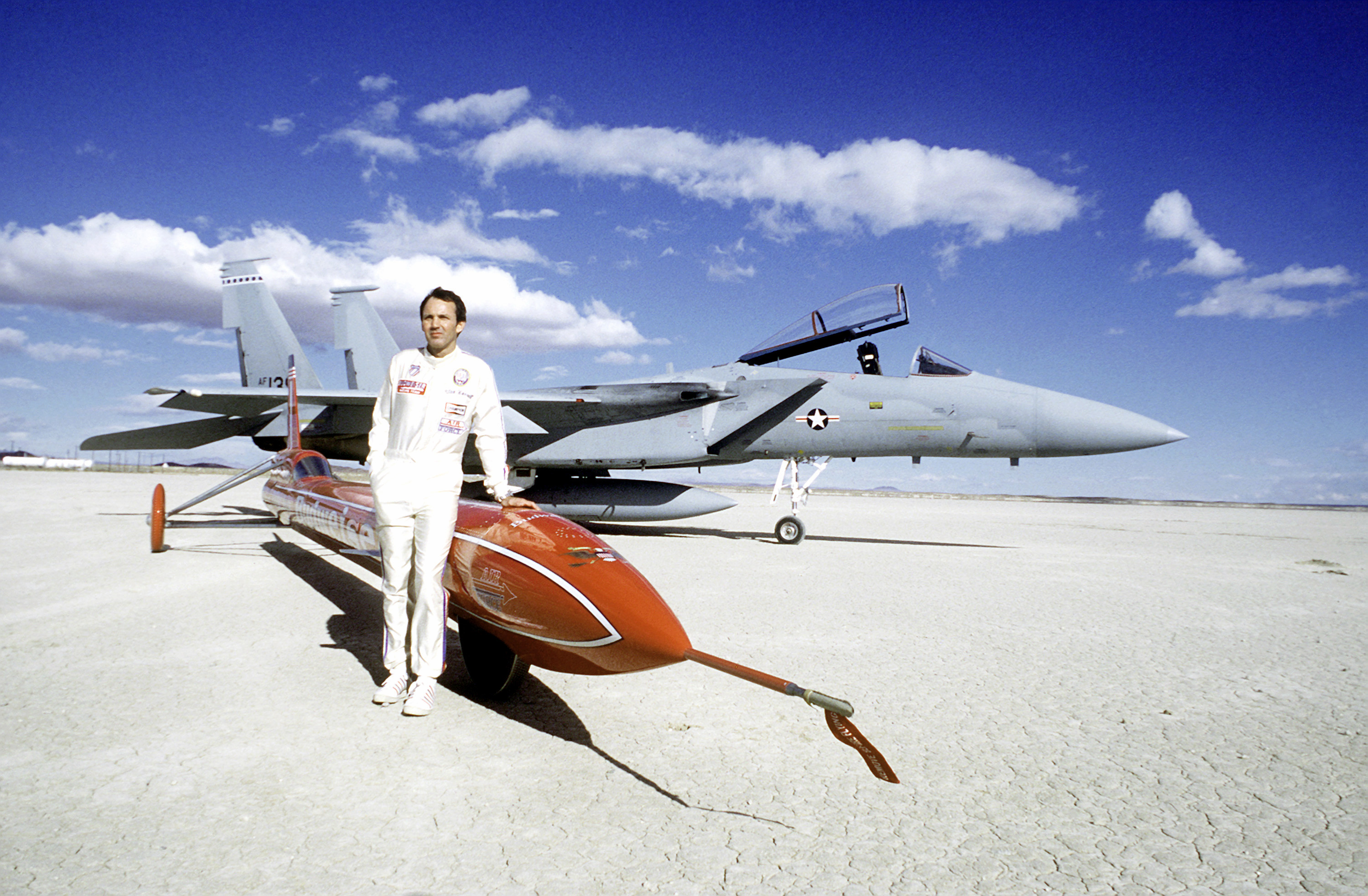
Barrett standing beside the Budweiser Rocket

In an effort led by Hal Needham, another Hollywood stuntman, and sponsored by Budweiser, the Budweiser Rocket was built with the intention of being the first land vehicle to break the sound barrier. The 3-wheeler was powered by a hybrid liquid and solid-fuel rocket engine. The solid fuel booster engine came from a Sidewinder missile.

At Rogers Dry Lake on Edwards Air Force Base, the vehicle, driven by Barrett, made on December 17, 1979, an attempt to break the sound barrier. The claimed speed of 739.666 mph, equalling Mach 1.01, was never officially recorded.

== NASCAR ==
The publicity gained from the attempt took Barrett to NASCAR. Between his movie commitments, Barrett found time to race in nineteen Winston Cup Series races during the 1980s. Barrett posted two top ten finishes, running his last race in 1990. In 1999, Barrett was scheduled to run three Craftsman Truck Series races for PBH Motorsports, who had planned to field a Cup team for his son Stanton Barrett. Stan was scheduled to run at Heartland Park Topeka Watkins Glen International and Sears Point Raceway.

In 2008, at the age of 65, Barrett made a surprising return to stock car racing. His son Stanton, running Chevrolets in the second tier Nationwide Series, invited Stan to run beside him in the SBM Motorsports team. After an abortive attempt at Mexico City, Stan later qualified for the Montreal and WGI races. He was forced to retire in both races.

== Stuntman career ==
Barrett has worked as a stuntman since the 1960s in motion pictures and television series. He has been stunt doubling and stunt coordinating for many of Hollywood actors in films such as When Time Ran Out... and Smokey and the Bandit. He also appeared in the 1980 TV movie Stunts Unlimited about stunt performers.

== Family ==
Barrett had two sons, David Barrett, a film director and stunt coordinator, and Stanton Barrett a stunt performer and racing driver. They are godsons of Paul Newman, and grandsons of Dave and Roma McCoy, founders of Mammoth Mountain Ski Area. Melissa Barrett Thorner is Stan's daughter.

== Motorsports career results ==
=== NASCAR ===
(key) (Bold – Pole position awarded by qualifying time. Italics – Pole position earned by points standings or practice time. * – Most laps led.)

==== Winston Cup Series ====
NASCAR Winston Cup Series results
Year	Team	No.	Make	1	2	3	4	5	6	7	8	9	10	11	12	13	14	15	16	17	18	19	20	21	22	23	24	25	26	27	28	29	30	31	NWCC	Pts	Ref
1980	Ulrich Racing	40	Chevy	RSD	DAY	RCH	CAR	ATL	BRI	DAR	NWS	MAR	TAL	NSV	DOV	CLT	TWS	RSD	MCH	DAY	NSV	POC	TAL	MCH	BRI	DAR	RCH	DOV	NWS	MAR	CLT	CAR; 11	ATL; 10	ONT; 13	NA	-	
1981	Mach 1 Racing	22	Pontiac	RSD	DAY; 13	RCH	CAR; 36	ATL; 16	BRI	NWS	DAR	MAR	TAL; 35	NSV	DOV	CLT; 32	TWS	RSD; 11	MCH; 18	DAY; 26	NSV	POC; 14	TAL; 9	MCH	BRI	DAR	RCH	DOV	MAR	NWS	CLT	CAR	ATL	RSD	38th	718	
1982	Ulrich Racing	6	Buick	DAY; 31	RCH	BRI	ATL	CAR	DAR	NWS	MAR	TAL	NSV	DOV	CLT	POC	RSD	MCH	DAY	NSV	POC	TAL	MCH	BRI	DAR	RCH	DOV	NWS	CLT	MAR	CAR	ATL	RSD		96th	70	
1989	Donlavey Racing	90	Ford	DAY	CAR	ATL	RCH	DAR	BRI	NWS	MAR	TAL	CLT	DOV	SON; DNQ	POC	MCH	DAY; 37	POC	TAL; 34	GLN; 26	MCH	BRI	DAR	RCH	DOV	MAR	CLT	NWS	CAR	PHO; 31	ATL			61st	155	
1990	Barkdoll Racing	72	Olds	DAY; DNQ	RCH	CAR	ATL	DAR	BRI	NWS	MAR	TAL	CLT	DOV																					74th	12	
1990	Hendrick Motorsports	18	Chevy												SON; 17	POC	MCH	DAY	POC	TAL	GLN	MCH	BRI	DAR	RCH	DOV	MAR	NWS	CLT	CAR	PHO	ATL			74th	12	

===== Daytona 500 =====
Year	Team	Manufacturer	Start	Finish
1981	Mach 1 Racing	Pontiac	22	13
1982	Ulrich Racing	Buick	41	31
1990	Barkdoll Racing	Oldsmobile	DNQ	

==== Nationwide Series ====
NASCAR Nationwide Series results
Year	Team	No.	Make	1	2	3	4	5	6	7	8	9	10	11	12	13	14	15	16	17	18	19	20	21	22	23	24	25	26	27	28	29	30	31	32	33	34	35	NNSC	Pts	Ref
2008	Stanton Barrett Motorsports	61	Chevy	DAY	CAL	LVS	ATL	BRI	NSH	TEX	PHO	MXC	TAL	RCH	DAR	CLT	DOV	NSH	KEN	MLW	NHA	DAY	CHI	GTY	IRP	CGV; 39	GLN; 33	MCH	BRI	CAL	RCH	DOV	KAN	CLT	MEM	TEX	PHO	HOM	116th	110	

== Television ==
Year	Title	Role	Notes
1969	Star Trek: The Original Series	The Jailor	S3:E23, "All Our Yesterdays"
