= Budweiser Rocket =

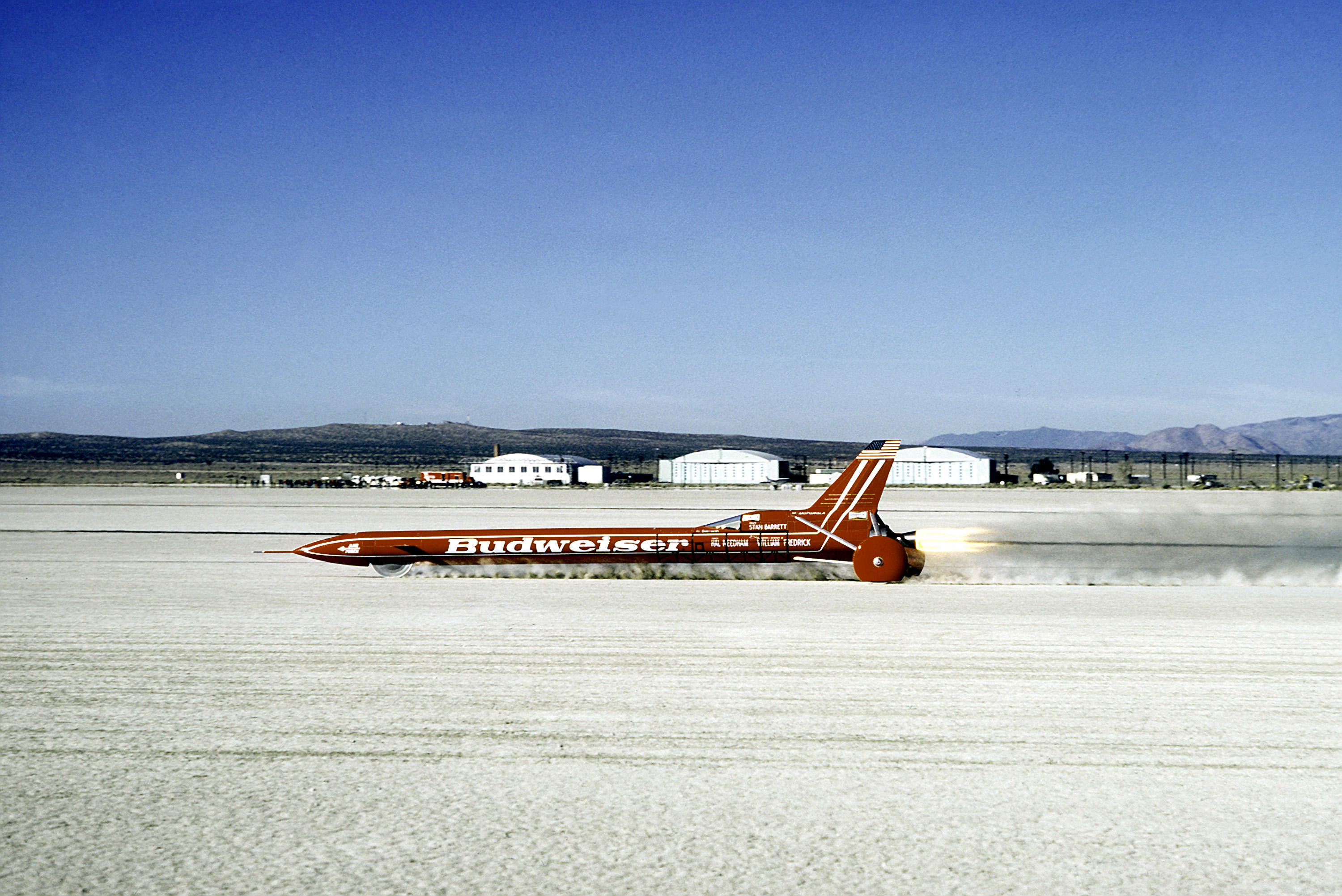
- Budweiser Rocket car, 1980

Overview
- Production: 1979
- Designer: William Fredrick

Powertrain
- Engine: Aerojet LR87 and Sidewinder Booster
- Power output: 968.4 kilonewtons (217,700 lb_{f})

Chronology
- Predecessor: SMI Motivator

The Budweiser Rocket is an American 3-wheeled land vehicle, generally resembling the 1970-era Blue Flame land speed record holding vehicle in appearance, powered by a liquid rocket engine with an extra solid-fuel booster from a Sidewinder missile, that has been claimed as being the first vehicle to have broken the sound barrier on land. The original forerunner to the vehicle was the "SMI Motivator" which was damaged badly enough to require a replacement, which in time was called the "Budweiser Rocket".

The vehicle, like its predecessor, was owned by film director Hal Needham, driven by Stan Barrett and designed and built by William Fredrick (Died in 2020). Neither the Fédération Internationale de Motocyclisme nor the Fédération Internationale de l'Automobile, the official speed record certifying bodies, recognise the record attempt, the speed purported to have been reached or that the vehicle ever attained supersonic speeds. The original Budweiser Rocket was donated to the Smithsonian Institution and a modified version with a narrower track, is in the Talladega Superspeedway Museum, Alabama. The original is no longer on display and is now in storage at the Smithsonian Institution Archives, Record Unit 360, National Museum of American History, Office of Public Affairs and Records.

== Controversy ==
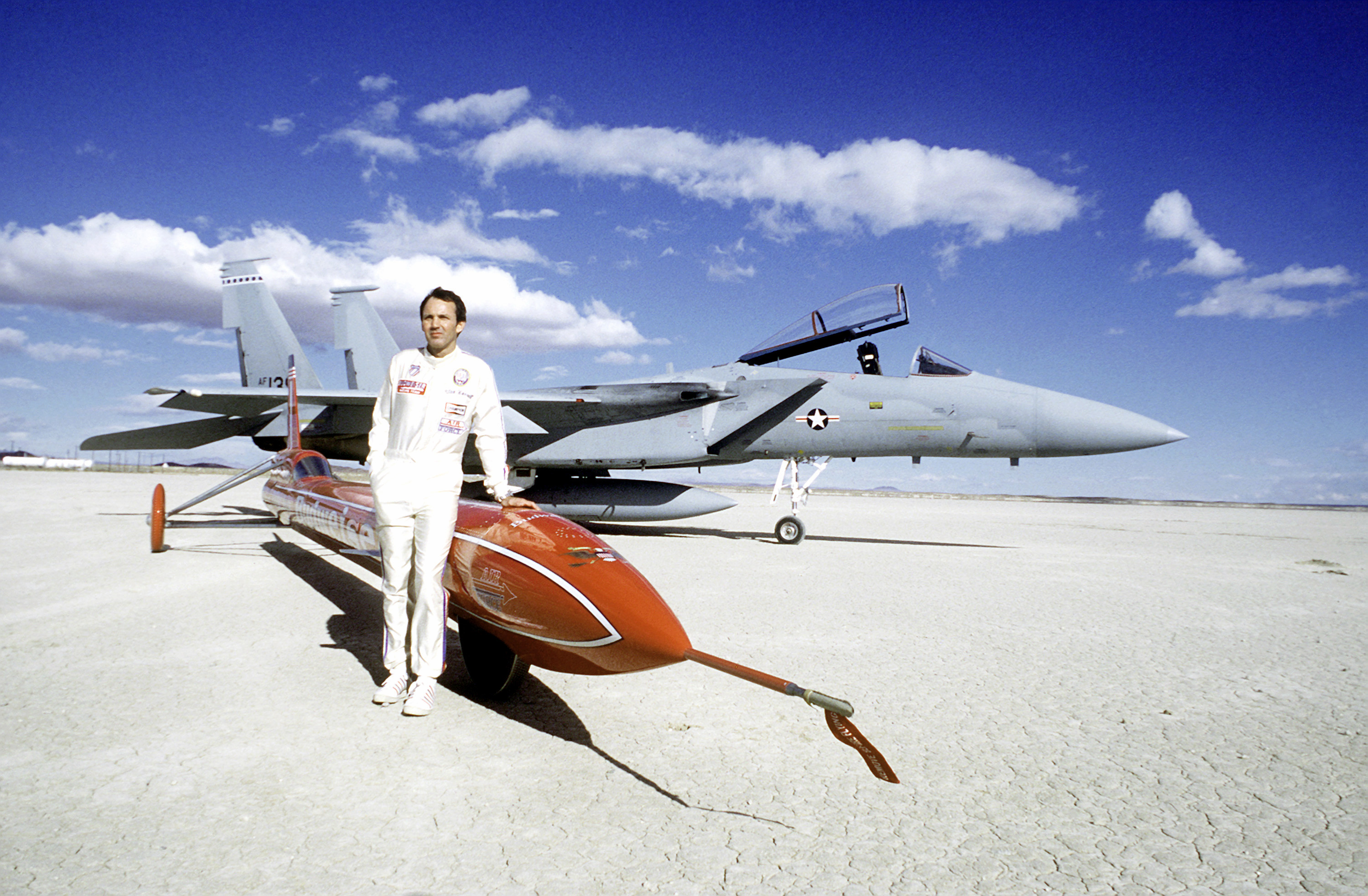
Stan Barrett stands beside the Budweiser Rocket car

The first run of the car at Bonneville Salt Flats showed that the propulsion system was unable to develop enough thrust to sustain a speed high enough to establish a new official World Land Speed Record. The team decided then that their goal would be to exceed the speed of sound on land, if only briefly, although no official authority would recognize this achievement as a record. The speed of sound is a function of the air temperature and pressure. In other words, the sound barrier is not an absolute speed value, but dependent on air conditions. The speed of sound during Barrett's speed run was 731.9 miles per hour (1,177.9 km/h).

The claim of breaking the sound barrier on land was made on December 17, 1979, after a run on Rogers Dry Lake at Edwards AFB. While it has been claimed that the Budweiser Rocket did briefly break the sound barrier, it could not gain any official titles because standard ground speed record regulations measure an average speed over a measured distance (either one kilometer or one mile (1.6 km), depending on the particular sanctioning body's rules). The measurement of the vehicle's top speed during the run has been disputed primarily because of the methods used to calculate the speed, and its extremely small margin of success.

No independent authority sanctioned the performance, although United States Air Force radar tracked the vehicle and recorded the azimuth, elevation, timing, and range data from which a top speed solution was calculated. This, along with the on-board accelerometer data was used to produce the estimated top speed of 739.666 miles per hour, or Mach 1.01. This data, however, has never been publicly released.

Witnesses dispute whether a sonic boom was heard. At least one reported hearing the boom. It is claimed that no-one heard the boom because of the short distance between the observers and the deafening sonic waves from the combined liquid and solid-fuel rockets used to propel the vehicle. Standing shock waves in the rocket exhaust produce continuous supersonic shock waves (a continuous "sonic boom"). The auditory dynamics of two roaring rocket exhausts, combined with the pounding physical effects of such intense sound waves over the short distance to the observers, made it questionable whether close observers could have differentiated the vehicle's sonic boom from the general cacophony of background noise. No boom was heard at greater distances either, in marked contrast to the runs of ThrustSSC, which generated extensive and well attested sonic booms over a wide area and a clearly visible shockwave.

Despite an unauthorized written speed certification by the United States Air Force, there is much debate over the validity of the claim. The Air Force states it "never intended to give official sanction to test results, nor to give the appearance of expressing an official view as to the speed attained by the test vehicle. Any such opinion was that of individual Air Force personnel, not of the Air Force". None of the land speed record sanctioning groups was present for the run, nor was the run duplicated within any particular time frame as required by most sanctioning bodies for official recognition of a new land speed record. No accurate measurement was taken of the car's speed, which was announced as having been calculated from radar tracking data along with accelerometer data which has not been made public. As a result, the Budweiser Rocket Car is not officially considered as the first vehicle to have broken the sound barrier on land, and few people believe the car to have actually done so. The British Thrust SSC is officially recognized by the FIA as breaking the land speed record — and the sound barrier as well — in 1997, with an average speed of 763.035 mph (1227.99 km/h) on a measured mile in both directions.

== See also ==
- Rocket car
