= British Motorcycle Charitable Trust =

The British Motorcycle Charitable Trust (BMCT) is a charitable incorporated organisation dedicated to promoting and supporting the preservation and restoration of British motorcycle engineering heritage. Established as a Registered Charity in 1979, the Trust aims to protect and restore rare British motorcycles and provide access to the public through a network of museums and annual motorcycle heritage events. The Trust also provides support and resources to educational establishments, clubs and private individuals and maintains information on all aspects of British motorcycles.

== Funding ==
As well as donations and membership subscriptions, the Trust benefits from legacies from motorcycle enthusiasts. The income is used to preserve rare British motorcycles and to improve the preservation of British motorcycle engineering heritage in the UK.

== Trustees ==
The Board of Trustees are all volunteer motorcycle enthusiasts with expertise in various areas of business. The current chairman is Peter Wellings.

== Museums ==
Between 1979 and 1995 the Trust developed the National Motorcycle Museum at Solihull before it was transferred to a private management company.

The BMCT are affiliated with and support a network of transport and local interest museums around the UK to display rare British motorcycles. Associate Members of the Trust enjoy discounted entry to the following collections:

- Black Country Living Museum
- Brooklands Museum
- Coventry Transport Museum
- Haynes International Motor Museum
- The Tank Museum
- National Motor Museum, Beaulieu
- Sammy Miller Motorcycle Museum
- Dover Transport Museum
- Stroud Museum in the Park
- Folk of Gloucester Museum
- Jet Age Museum
- Norton Collection Museum
- Grampian Transport Museum
- Internal Fire Museum of Power
- Derby Museum of Making
- Isle of Man Motor Museum
- Manx Museum, Douglas
- Royal Engineers Museum
- County Classics Motor Museum

The Trust also supports the Manx National Heritage museum and has provided financial assistance to help them preserve historic British motorcycles with TT and MGP history.

The Black Country Living Museum benefited in 2001 from a joint BMCT / Heritage Lottery Fund grant to purchase the Marston Collection of Wolverhampton built motorcycles, which included several rare Black Country motorcycles including a 1918 Sunbeam military vehicle found in a derelict state in France. Grant aid was also given so that the museum could erect a replica 1930s motorcycle shop within its grounds, complete with rare locally built motorcycles and associated memorabilia. The Trust's latest project has been to provide financial assistance for the superb new "Life on Two Wheels" permanent exhibition at the Haynes Motor Museum near Yeovil, Somerset.

In 2014 a totally revamped motorcycle display opened at the National Motor Museum in Beaulieu, Hampshire, thanks to a £75,000 grant from the BMCT.

== Motorcycles ==
The British Motorcycle Charitable Trust owns a collection of rare British motorcycles which are on long-term loan to various affiliated museums, including a 1911 BSA 3.5 HP, a Scott Flying Squirrel, a 1923 Beardmore Precision and a 1937 Brough Superior SS80. The Trust has recently acquired the last running Triumph Bandit which it has loaned to the Grampian Transport Museum and a rare Carfield 'Baby' from 1923 which has a 1.5 HP Villiers engine and won a bronze medal in the Scottish Six Days Trial covering over 1,000 miles in challenging conditions. The Trust also provided for the restoration of a 1936 Triumph Tiger 80 by the Coventry Transport Museum. In 2015 a unique Matchless Vickers machine gun outfit from the First World War was saved for the nation when the BMCT acquired it and provided for its exhibition at the Tank Museum in Dorset. In 2013 the BMCT acquired the Spalding Collection, comprising an example of every make of British motor scooter made between 1946 and 1962. An exhibition of these machines (to be known as the British Scooter Collection) opened in the Spring of 2016 at the Haynes International Motor Museum and was later transferred to the Isle of Man Motor Museum at Jurby in 2021.}

== Educational work ==
The Trust funds a range of research and educational work relating to the British motorcycle industry and has funded work by staff at Coventry Transport Museum to write a history of the motorcycle manufacturing industry in Coventry.

The Trust also helped to fund the development of the Resource Centre at Haynes International Motor Museum near Yeovil, where information and literature on British motorcycles is being digitised for the benefit of enthusiasts and restorers throughout the World.
