= Blue Flame =

Rocket-powered land speed racing vehicle

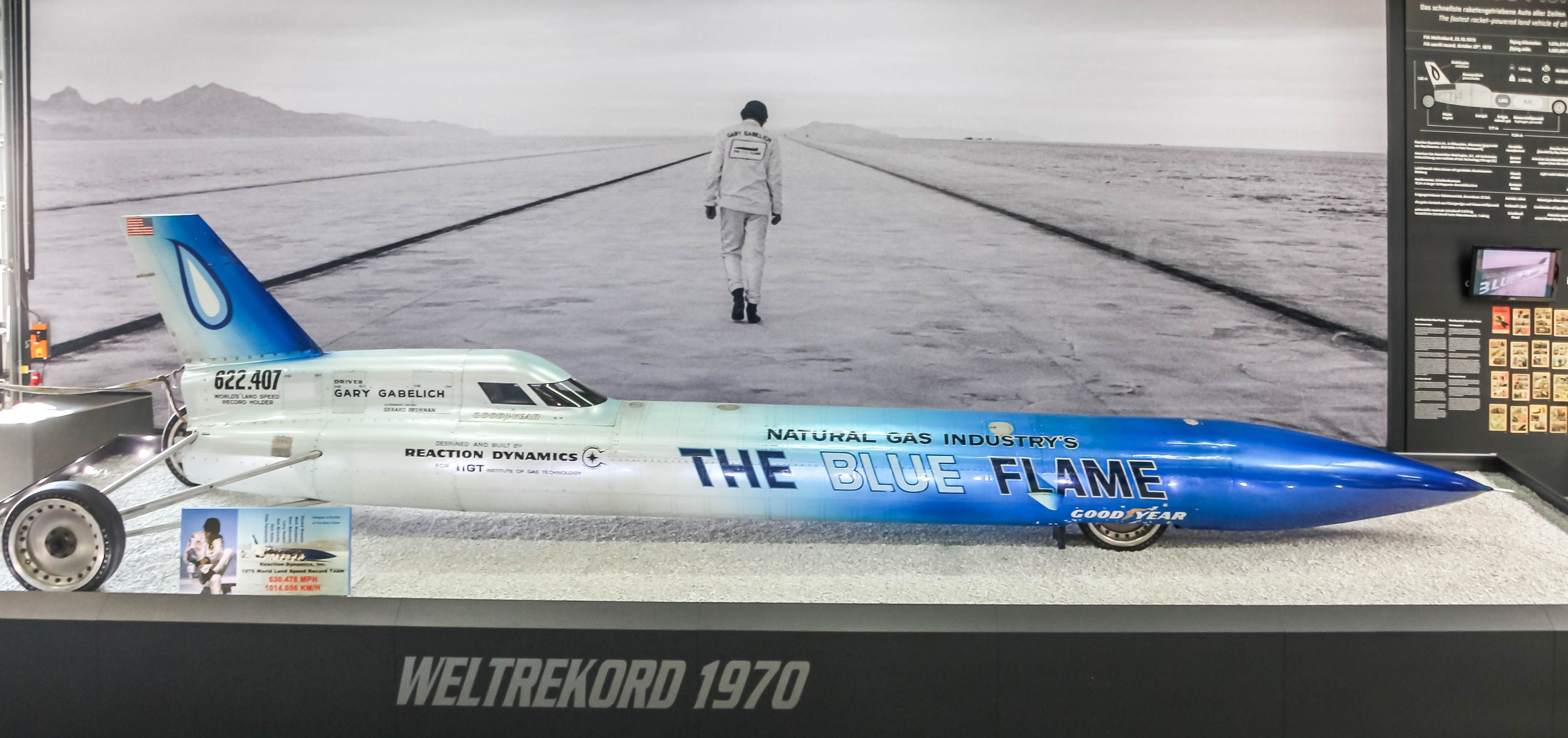
- Blue Flame on display in Sinsheim Auto & Technik Museum, Germany

Overview
- Manufacturer: Reaction Dynamics

Body and chassis
- Class: Land Speed Record vehicle

Powertrain
- Engine: hydrogen peroxide rocket

Dimensions
- Wheelbase: 25 ft 6 in (7.77 m)
- Length: 38 ft 2.6 in (11.648 m)
- Width: 2 ft 2 in (0.66 m)
- Height: 8 ft 1.5 in (2.477 m)
- Curb weight: 6,600 lb (3,000 kg)

Chronology
- Predecessor: Spirit of America – Sonic 1
- Successor: Thrust2

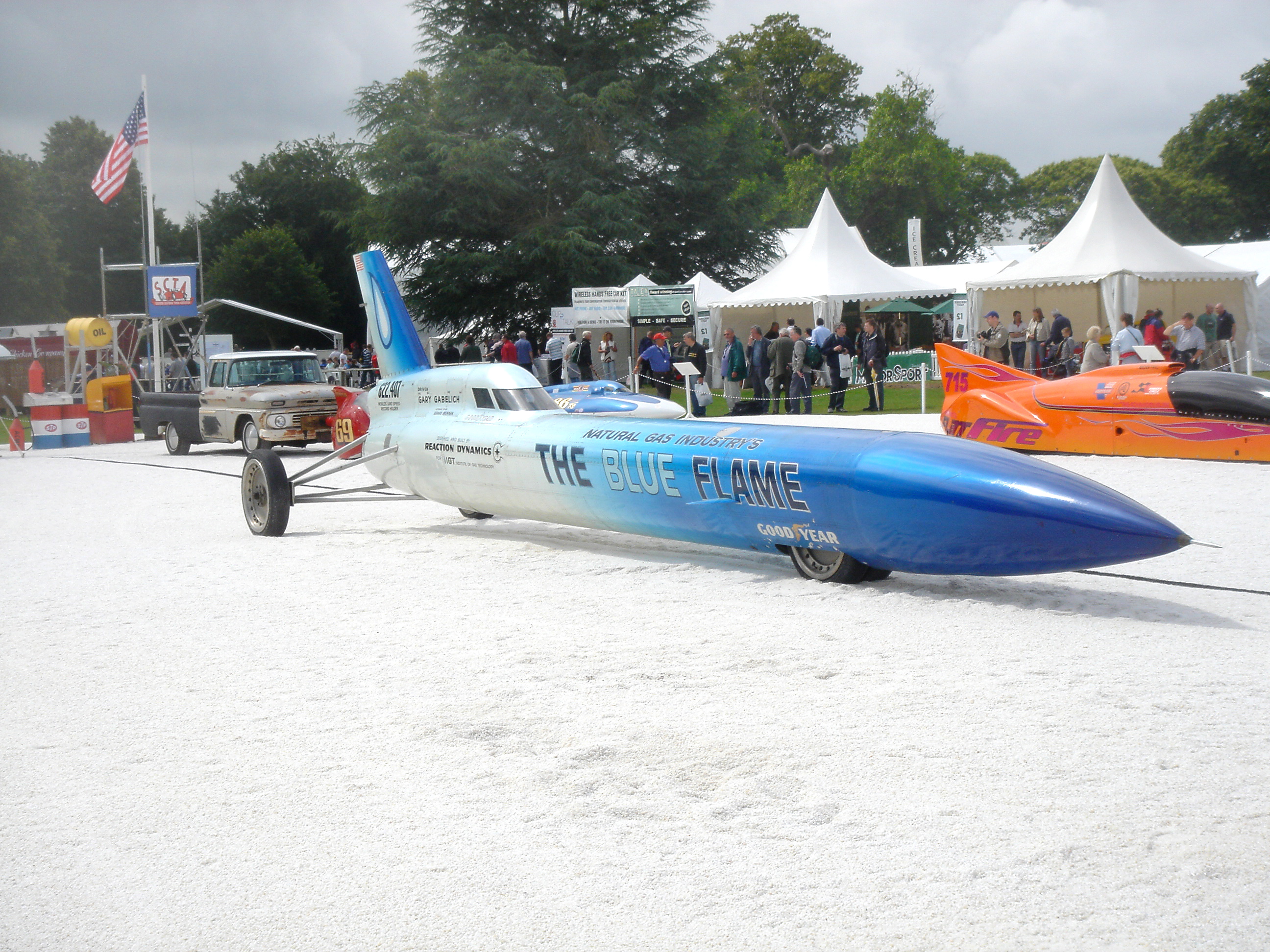
Blue Flame at Goodwood

Blue Flame is a rocket-powered land speed racing vehicle that was driven by Gary Gabelich and achieved a world land speed record on Bonneville Salt Flats in Utah on October 23, 1970. The vehicle set the FIA world record for the flying mile at 622.407 mph (1,001.667 km/h) and the flying kilometer at 630.388 mph (1,014.511 km/h). Blue Flame's world record speed stood for thirteen years before being exceeded by Thrust2 in 1983.

== Design and construction ==
Blue Flame was constructed in Milwaukee, Wisconsin by Reaction Dynamics, a company formed by Pete Farnsworth, Ray Dausman and Dick Keller, who had developed the first hydrogen peroxide rocket dragster, called the X-1 and driven by Chuck Suba.

=== Rocket Engine ===
Blue Flame's engine is a regeneratively cooled variable-thrust liquid-propellant engine, using a combination of high-test peroxide and liquified natural gas (LNG), pressurized by helium gas. The effort was sponsored by the American Gas Association, with technical assistance from the Institute of Gas Technology of Des Plaines, IL.

The engine can operate on either a single- or dual-propellant basis. In operation, it permits natural gas use as a liquid, gas, or both with a two-stage combustion start. The oxidizer flow is established first, then LNG enters a heat exchanger where it vaporizes and is brought to combustion temperature. The gas is then injected into the combustion chamber with the oxygen provided by the hydrogen peroxide. A stable flame front is established and the remaining liquified natural gas (LNG) is injected to bring the engine to full power.

Nominal engine running time was 20 seconds at full thrust of 22,500 lbf (100 kN), the equivalent of 58,000 hp (43 MW). Reaction Dynamics subsequently modified the LNG flow in the two-stage injector system to almost halve the maximum thrust.

=== Chassis ===
Blue Flame uses an aluminum semi-monocoque with welded tubular structure in the nose section and an aluminum "skin." The vehicle is 38 ft 2.6 in (11.648 m) long, 8 ft 1.5 in (2.477 m) high to the top of the tail fin, and 7 ft 8 in (2.34 m) wide, with a wheelbase of 25 ft 6 in (7.77 m). It has a weight of approximately 6,600 lb (3,000 kg). Goodyear designed 8:00-25 tires for the vehicle, with an outside diameter of 34.8 in (880 mm) and smooth tread surface to help prevent heat buildup, filled with nitrogen gas at 350 psi (24 bar).

== Land speed record ==
On 23 October 1970 at Bonneville, Gary Gabelich drove Blue Flame to a new record of 622.407 mph (1,001.667 km/h) for the flying mile, 630.388 mph (1,014.511 km/h) for the flying kilometre.

The actual thrust during the record runs was between 13,000 lbf (58 kN) [equivalent of 35,000 hp (26 MW)] and 15,000 lbf (67 kN). Blue Flame's record runs involved accelerating continuously to the mile midpoint, then coasting through the mile. The peak speed, approximately 650 mph (1,050 km/h), was reached at that point and then the vehicle decelerated the rest of the way. The kilometer speed trap was biased towards one end of the mile, resulting in the 8 mph (12.9 km/h) higher speed.

== Legacy ==
Blue Flame is now on permanent exhibition at the Auto and Technik Museum Sinsheim in Germany.

== See also ==
- Rocket car
- Budweiser Rocket
- Bloodhound LSR
