= BSA Fury =

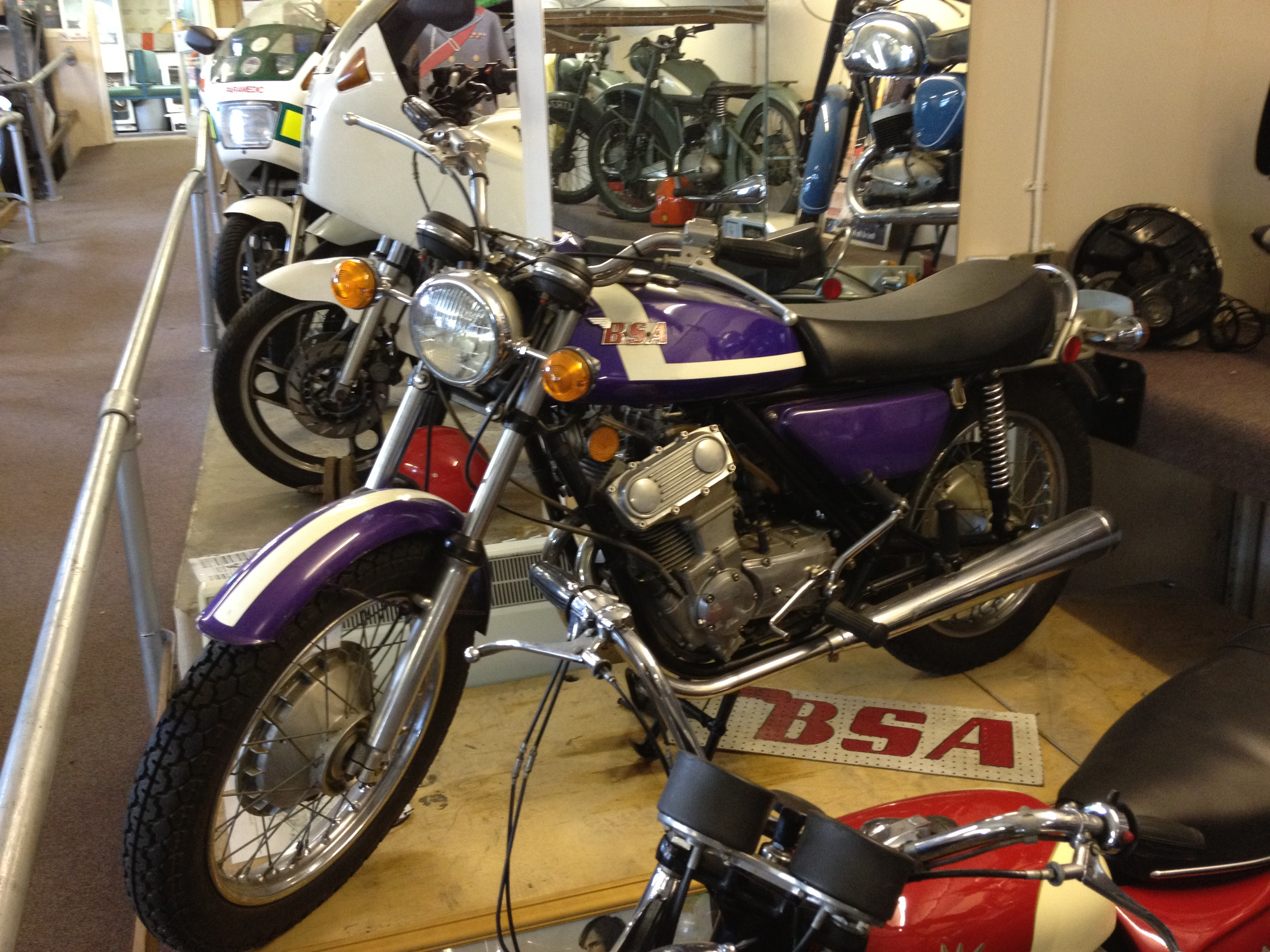
- 1971 BSA Fury pre-production prototype
- Manufacturer: BSA
- Also called: BSA E35
- Production: 1970
- Engine: 349 cc (21.3 cu in) DOHC straight-twin
- Power: 34 hp (25 kW) @ 9,000 rpm
- Transmission: Wet multiplate clutch, five speed gearbox
- Weight: 156 kg (344 lb) (dry)

The BSA Fury was a Birmingham Small Arms Company (BSA) prototype motorcycle made in 1970. Designed by Edward Turner but substantially redesigned by Bert Hopwood and Doug Hele, the Fury never went into commercial production due to the collapse of the BSA Group.

== Development ==
Launched in 1971, the 349 cc (21.3 cu in) double overhead cam twin BSA E35 was branded the BSA Fury. It was essentially the same motorcycle as the Triumph Bandit and represented the BSA factory's last attempt to compete against Japanese imports. The frame used for the Fury was designed by Rob North, designer of the frames used on the racing BSA triples. A 'Street Scrambler' E35SS and road version the E35R were developed during 1971. Featuring upswept twin silencers, the SS had an optional electric starter and indicators and 26 mm Amal Concentric carburettors. The Fury delivered 34 bhp (25 kW) and could reach 110 mph (180 km/h). BSA invested their scarce resources on publicity for the Fury under the slogan "A new kind of Power". Multi-page brochure inserts were put in all of the major US motorcycle publications and BSA and Triumph were counting on the Fury and Bandit to bring them back into profitability. Promotional photographs for the new bike (featuring BSA/Triumph Chief Stylist Stephen Mettam and British actress-model Karen Young posing in the grounds of Umberslade Hall) were produced, the Fury also having been included in the 1971 BSA customer brochure.

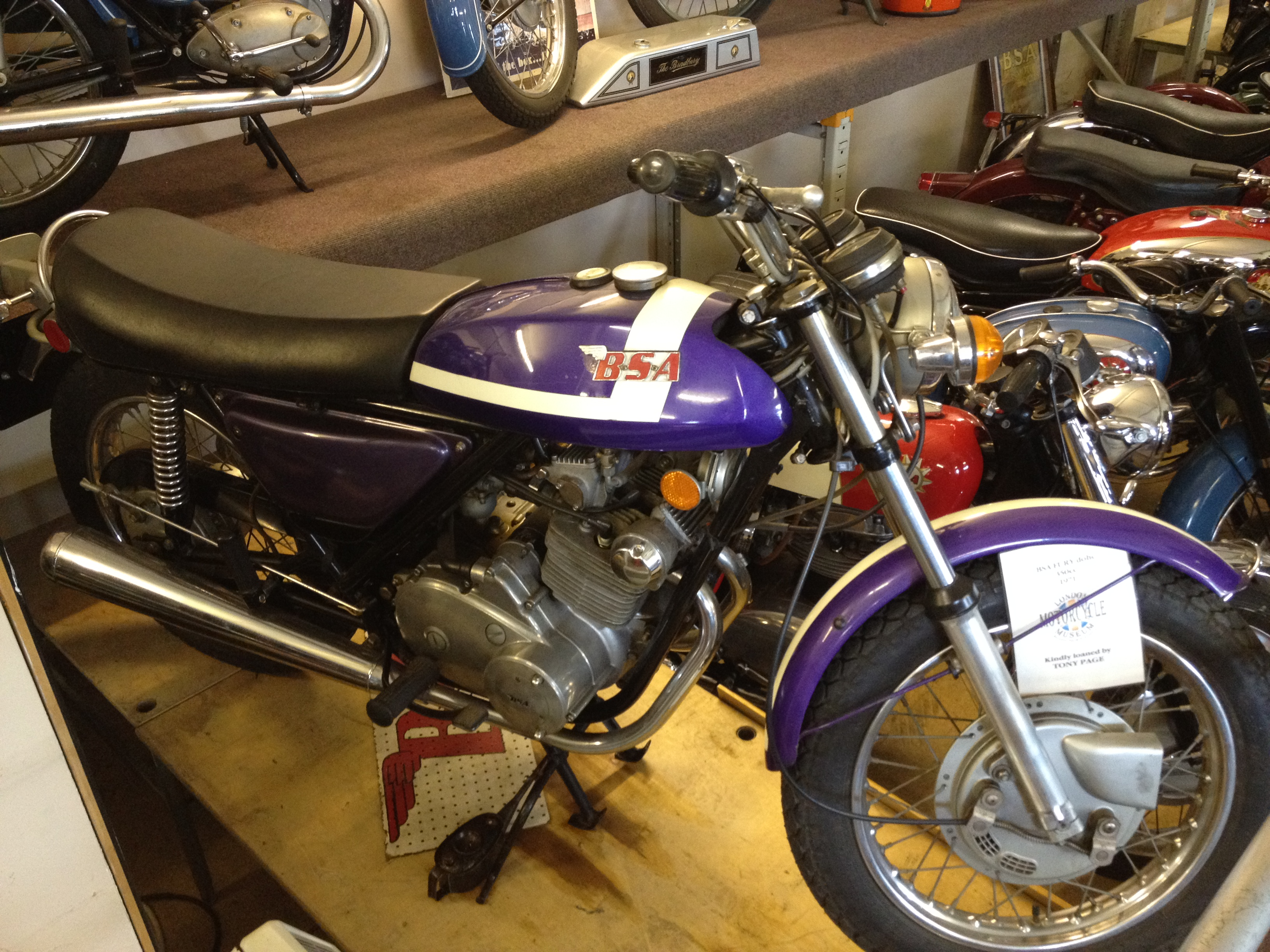
BSA Fury on display at the London Motorcycle Museum

== Financial problems ==
BSA invested heavily in modernising and reorganising their Small Heath factory in Birmingham and the research and design facility at Umberslade Hall, with the aim of improving efficiency and becoming more competitive. The Directors asked for full cooperation from the workforce and agreed a 10% cut in their own salaries. By the summer of 1972 BSA had an £8,000,000 trading loss and work was delayed by staff disputes. By November 1972 BSA Group debts exceeded £20 million. Design work continued on 4 and 5 cylinder versions of the Fury but by November 1972 BSA had to give in to creditors and the BSA Group was forced into a partnership with Norton as its debts exceeded £20 million. The Fury, which was to have saved the company, never went into commercial production and only eight prototypes survived.

== Surviving examples ==
BSA Fury prototypes are on display at the London Motorcycle Museum in Greenford, London and the National Motorcycle Museum in Solihull. A BSA Fury with no internal parts was displayed at BSA dealer Len Vale-Onslow's shop in 1984
