= Isopropyl nitrate =

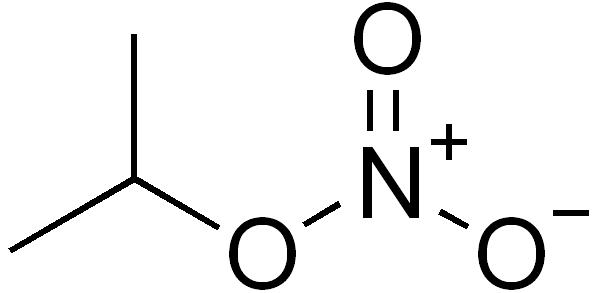

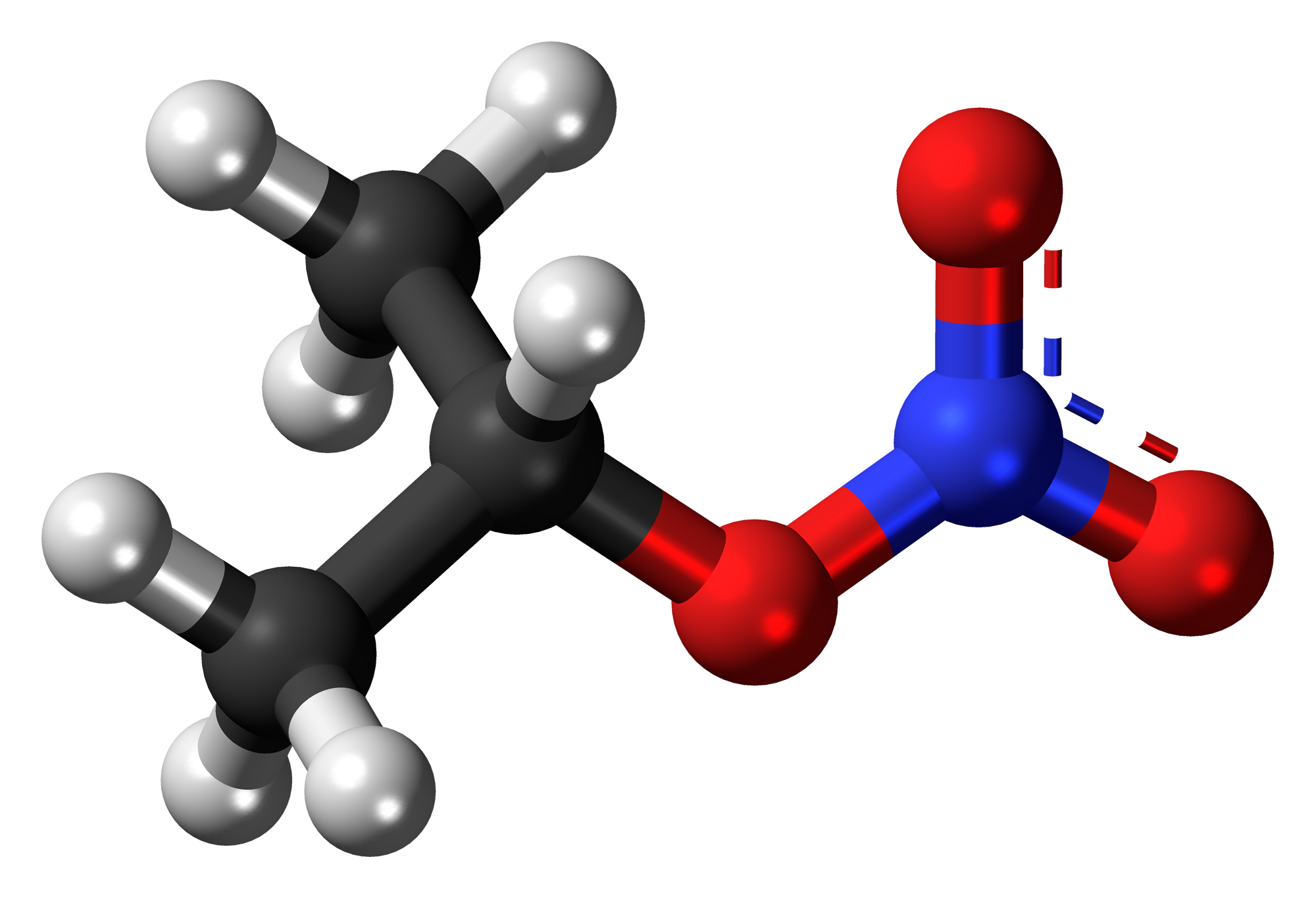

Names
- Preferred IUPAC name Propan-2-yl nitrate
- Other names Isopropyl nitrate Isonite

Identifiers
CAS Number	1712-64-7
3D model (JSmol)	Interactive image
ChEMBL	ChEMBL401410
ChemSpider	14818
ECHA InfoCard	100.015.439
PubChem CID	15575
UNII	UPE48E4UJ4
CompTox Dashboard (EPA)	DTXSID5061908
- InChI: InChI=1S/C3H7NO3/c1-3(2)7-4(5)6/h3H,1-2H3 Key: GAPFWGOSHOCNBM-UHFFFAOYSA-N; InChI=1/C3H7NO3/c1-3(2)7-4(5)6/h3H,1-2H3 Key: GAPFWGOSHOCNBM-UHFFFAOYAE
- SMILES: CC(C)O[N+](=O)[O-]

Properties
Chemical formula	C_{3}H_{7}NO_{3}
Molar mass	105.09 g/mol
Appearance	Colorless liquid
Density	1.036 g/cm^{3}, liquid
Melting point	−82.5 °C (−116.5 °F; 190.7 K)
Boiling point	101.5 °C (214.7 °F; 374.6 K)
Acidity (pK_{a})	16.9
Viscosity	0.66 cP at 20 °C

Hazards
Flash point	22.2 °C (72.0 °F; 295.3 K)
Safety data sheet (SDS)	External MSDS
- Except where otherwise noted, data are given for materials in their standard state (at 25 °C [77 °F], 100 kPa). verify (what is ?) Infobox references

Isopropyl nitrate (IPN, 2-propyl nitrate) is a colorless liquid monopropellant. It is used as a diesel cetane improver. IPN is a low-sensitivity explosive, with a detonation velocity of approximately 5400 m/s.

Isopropyl nitrate is extremely flammable and burns with a practically invisible flame. This presents unique hazards in its handling. The flame is significantly less luminous than hydrogen or methanol flame and is only visible due to the turbulent hot air it generates. Nevertheless, it is officially classed as safe to transport provided it is labelled as flammable.

Isopropyl nitrate was previously used in a jet engine rapid starting system for military interceptor aircraft (a requirement for fast scrambling, as it provided simultaneous, near-instantaneous engine starting for twin engines) and was known as AVPIN. Early systems, as used on the Gloster Javelin, used a simple pressurising cartridge and had a poor reputation for misfires, including engine-destroying explosions. Nevertheless, Rolls-Royce was able to demonstrate that the fuel is extremely stable and that a cannon shell could be fired through a container of it with no dramatic effect. Isopropyl nitrate was also sold by the Turbonique company under the brand name "Thermolene" as a fuel for their line of turbine-powered "drag axles" and superchargers, during the 1960s.

The exhaust fumes from an AVPIN monopropellant engine may themselves be explosive, if mixed with further air. Although engine starters do not require an air supply for their basic operation, air was supplied to later designs, such as that of the English Electric Lightning, by an automatic scavenge pump simply to control these fumes. The history of AVPIN use on the Lightning demonstrated it was both safe and effective in use. The reduced availability of AVPIN is now a restriction on the continued operation of some preserved military aircraft, such as Lightnings in the UK and South Africa and some are thus being converted to electric starting.

It has also been used as a fuel for power supply and actuation in guided weapons, notably in the British Royal Navy.
