= Rocket car =

Land vehicle propelled by a rocket engine

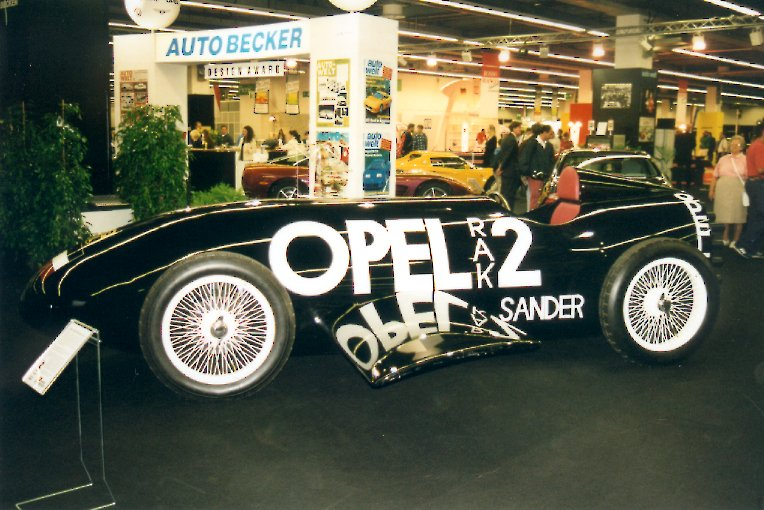
Opel RAK.2 rocket car

A rocket car is a land vehicle propelled by a rocket engine. A rocket dragster is a rocket car used for competing in drag racing, and this type holds the unofficial world record for the 1/4 mile.

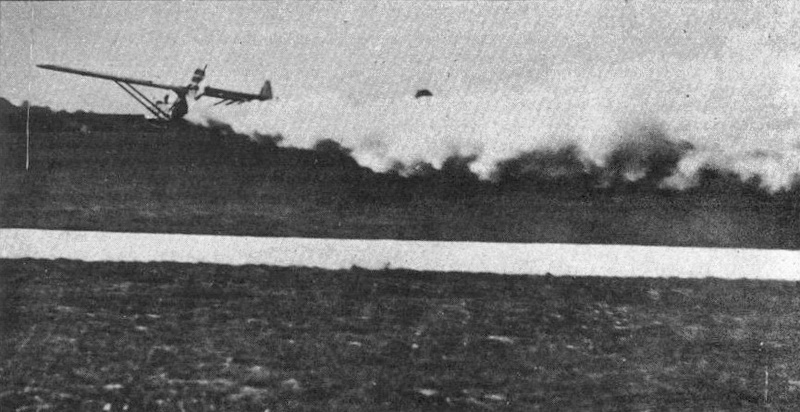
Opel RAK.1 - World's first public flight of a manned rocket-powered plane on September 30, 1929

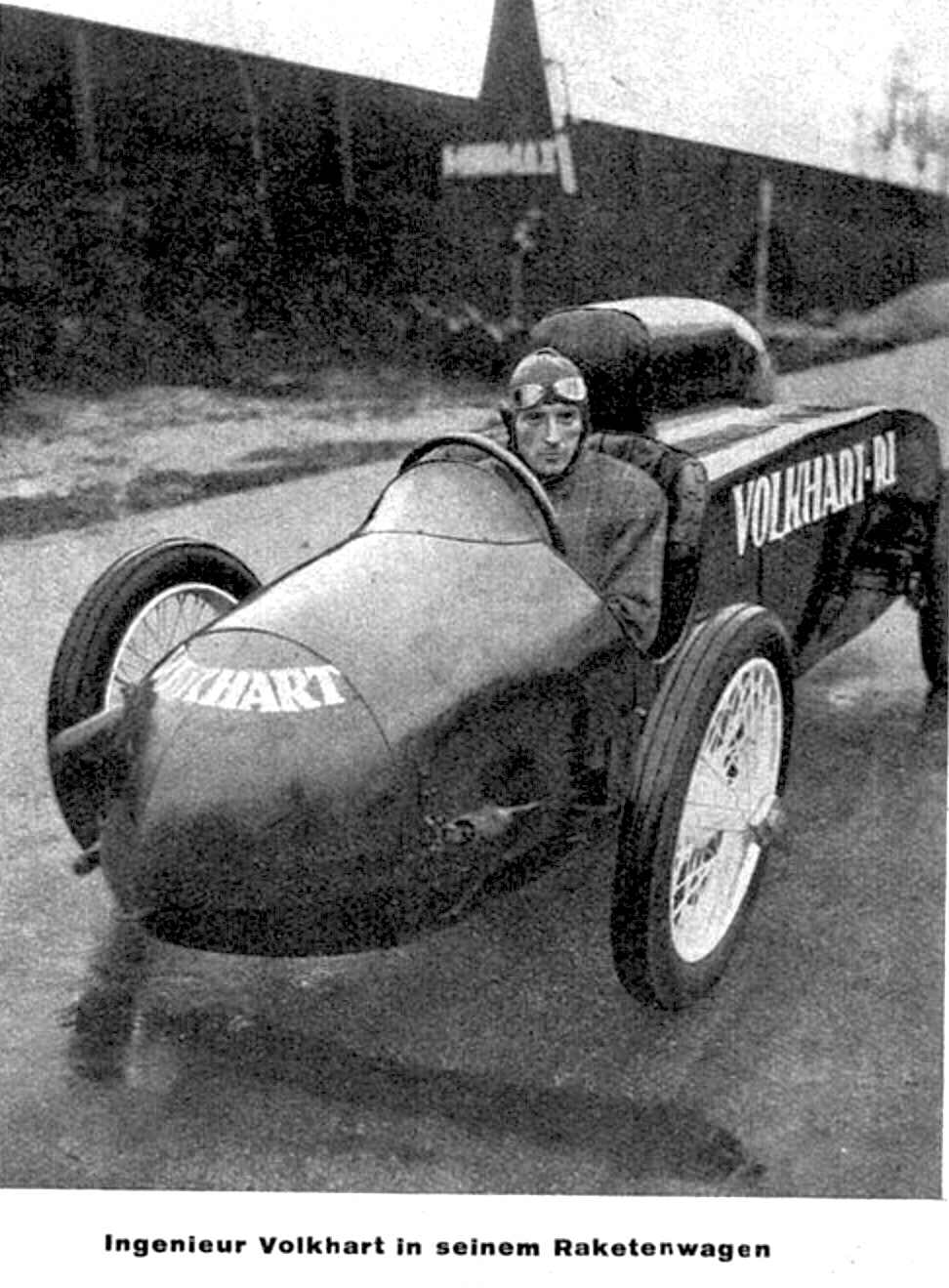
Volkhart-R1

Fritz von Opel was instrumental in popularizing rockets as means of propulsion for vehicles. In the 1920s, he initiated together with Max Valier, co-founder of the "Verein für Raumschiffahrt", the world's first rocket program, Opel-RAK, leading to speed records for automobiles, rail vehicles and the first manned rocket-powered flight in September of 1929. Months earlier in 1928, one of his rocket-powered prototypes, the Opel RAK2, reached piloted by von Opel himself at the AVUS speedway in Berlin a record speed of 238 km/h, watched by 3000 spectators and world media, among them Fritz Lang, director of Metropolis and Woman in the Moon, world boxing champion Max Schmeling and many more sports and show business celebrities. A world record for rail vehicles was reached with RAK3 and a top speed of 256 km/h. After these successes, von Opel piloted the world's first public rocket-powered flight using Opel RAK.1, a rocket plane designed by Julius Hatry. World media reported on these efforts, including UNIVERSAL Newsreel of the US, causing as "Raketen-Rummel" or "Rocket Rumble" immense global public excitement, and in particular in Germany, where inter alia Wernher von Braun was highly influenced. The Great Depression led to an end of the Opel-RAK program, but Max Valier continued the efforts. After switching from solid-fuel to liquid-fuel rockets, he died while testing and is considered the first fatality of the dawning space age.

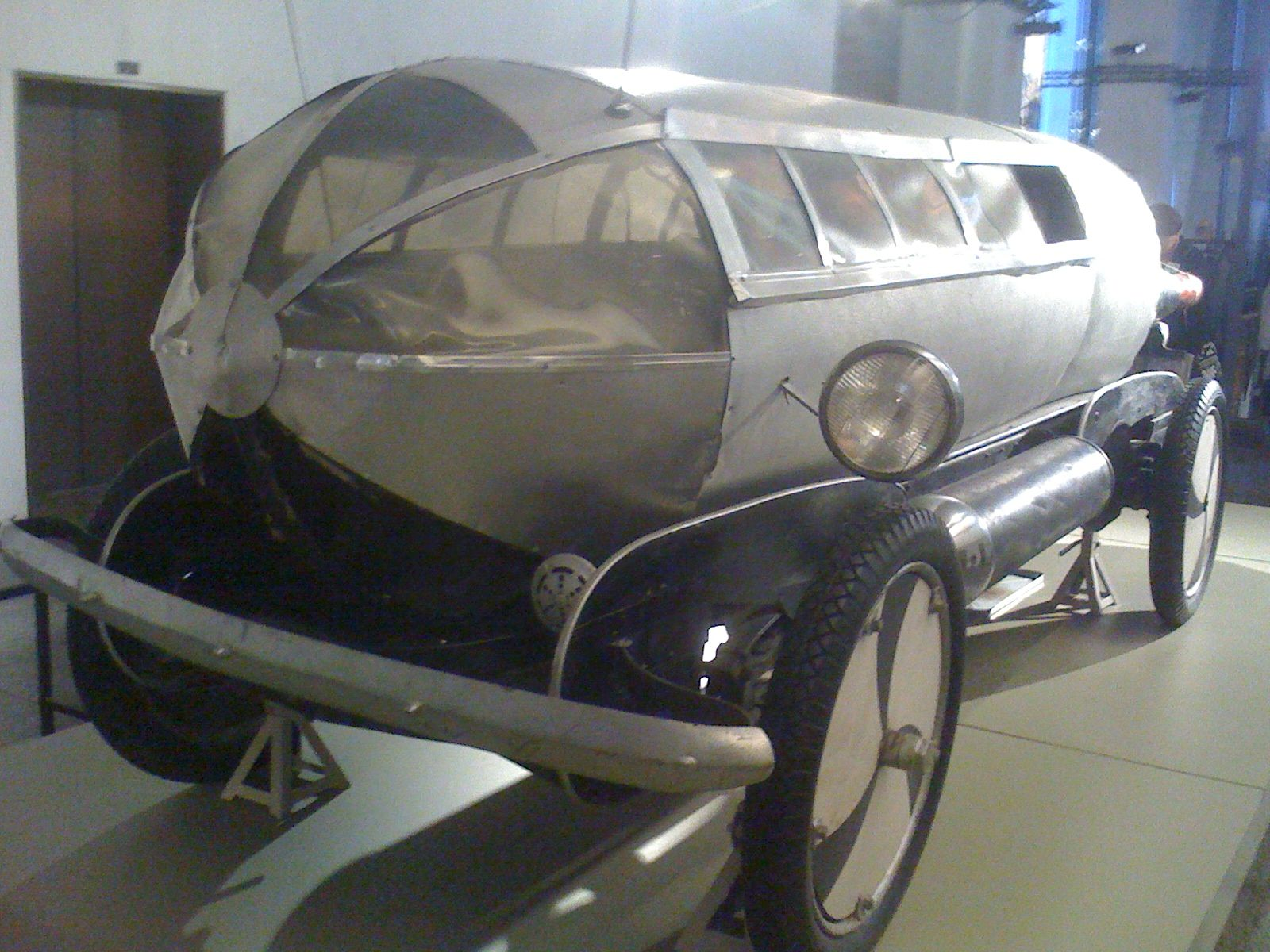
Shirley Lois Moon Girl, research vehicle in 1929, built by brothers Daniel and Floyd Hungerford on Chevrolet chassis mod. 1921 and equipped with auxiliary propulsion rocket

Rocket cars are capable of very high speeds, and at one time held the land speed record (now held by a jet car). Rocket cars differ from jet-powered cars in that they carry both fuel and oxidizer on board, eliminating the need for an air inlet and compressor which add weight and increase drag. Rocket cars run their engines for relatively short periods of time, usually less than 20 seconds, but the acceleration levels that rocket cars can reach due to their high thrust-to-weight ratio are very high and high speeds are fairly easily achieved.

Sammy Miller in 1984 at Santa Pod Raceway recorded the quickest quarter mile elapsed time ever of 3.58 seconds at 386.26mph using a hydrogen peroxide powered engine car called Vanishing Point. The record was witnessed by 10,000 spectators and officials in attendance. This is in excess of the performance of more familiar piston-engined dragsters.

A different type of rocket propulsion uses hybrid rockets with nitrous oxide as the oxidant such as the British rocket dragster, 'Laffin-Gas'.

In America, rocket dragsters fell into disuse after their hydrogen peroxide propellant became too expensive and they are banned in most events for safety reasons, mostly due to their very high performance. However, they continue to run at several European venues.

Tesla Motors plans to produce a rocket-power-assisted production road car, as an option package. The "SpaceX" option package for the 2020s Tesla Roadster was announced in 2018. This optioned-up Roadster package would add cold gas thrusters powered by compressed air to improve performance.

== History ==
- Alexandru Ciurcu, Romanian rocketry pioneer
- Max Valier, Austrian rocketry pioneer
- Friedrich Sander, rocketry pioneer

== Notable rocket cars ==
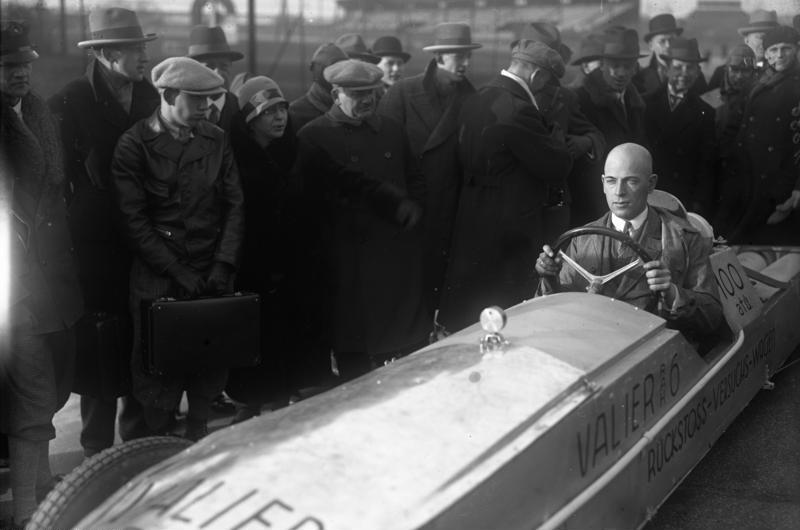
Opel Rak.6 rocket car

- Bloodhound LSR, hybrid jet/rocket car, under development since 2008
- Blue Flame, a vehicle that held the land speed record
- Budweiser Rocket, the first land vehicle claimed to have unofficially broken the sound barrier
- Heylandt Rocket Car (see Arthur Rudolph)
- Opel RAK.1, the first rocket car
- Valier-Heylandt Rak 7, the first rocket car with liquid propulsion

== See also ==
- JATO Rocket Car, an urban legend
- Rocket sled
- Turbonique, a pioneer rocket power company
- The Devil at Your Heels, a documentary covering an attempt to cross the Saint Lawrence River in a rocket car
