= John Ackroyd (engineer) =

British engineer (1937–2021)

John Gilbert Ackroyd (31 January 1937 – 25 January 2021) was a British engineer.

== Early and personal life ==
Ackroyd born in Muttra, India, on 31 January 1937, and grew up in England from the age of seven.

He was educated in Ryde, Folkestone and Ardingly College.

Ackroyd married Birgit Häggman in 1963. The couple divorced in the early 1980s. They had two daughters Anna and Lisa.

== Career ==
Ackroyd started his engineering career with an apprenticeship at Saunders-Roe in East Cowes on the Isle of Wight. His final job as an apprentice was in the design department working on the SR53 prototype fighter aircraft with a mixed jet and rocket propulsion system.

Ackroyd then took a lead role in designing and engineering at Cushioncraft for Britten-Norman. The CC7 launched in 1969 but when the company was sold Ackroyd was again out of a job.

After two years in Germany with the aircraft manufacturer Dornier, he became the project designer of the world's first production electric car for the Isle of Wight-based Enfield Automotive, which commenced sales in 1973 as the Enfield 8000.

In 1978 he joined the Thrust 2 land speed record project, which went on the achieve the record in 1983.

In 1981 he was involved with the Vanishing Point rocket sled which achieved the World Ice Speed Record at 248 mph (399.1 km/h) in 1981, and in 1999, the Gillette Mach 3 Challenger which set the motorcycle speed record of 365 mph (587.4 km/h).

In 1987 he teamed up with the Swedish aeronautical engineer Per Lindstrand and Richard Branson for a project to cross the Atlantic in a balloon. Ackroyd designed the pressurised capsule for the Virgin Atlantic Flyer, and the first to cross the Atlantic Ocean in 1987.

== Death ==
Ackroyd died of complications from Alzheimer's disease on 25 January 2021, aged 83.
