= Thrust2 =

Land speed record vehicle

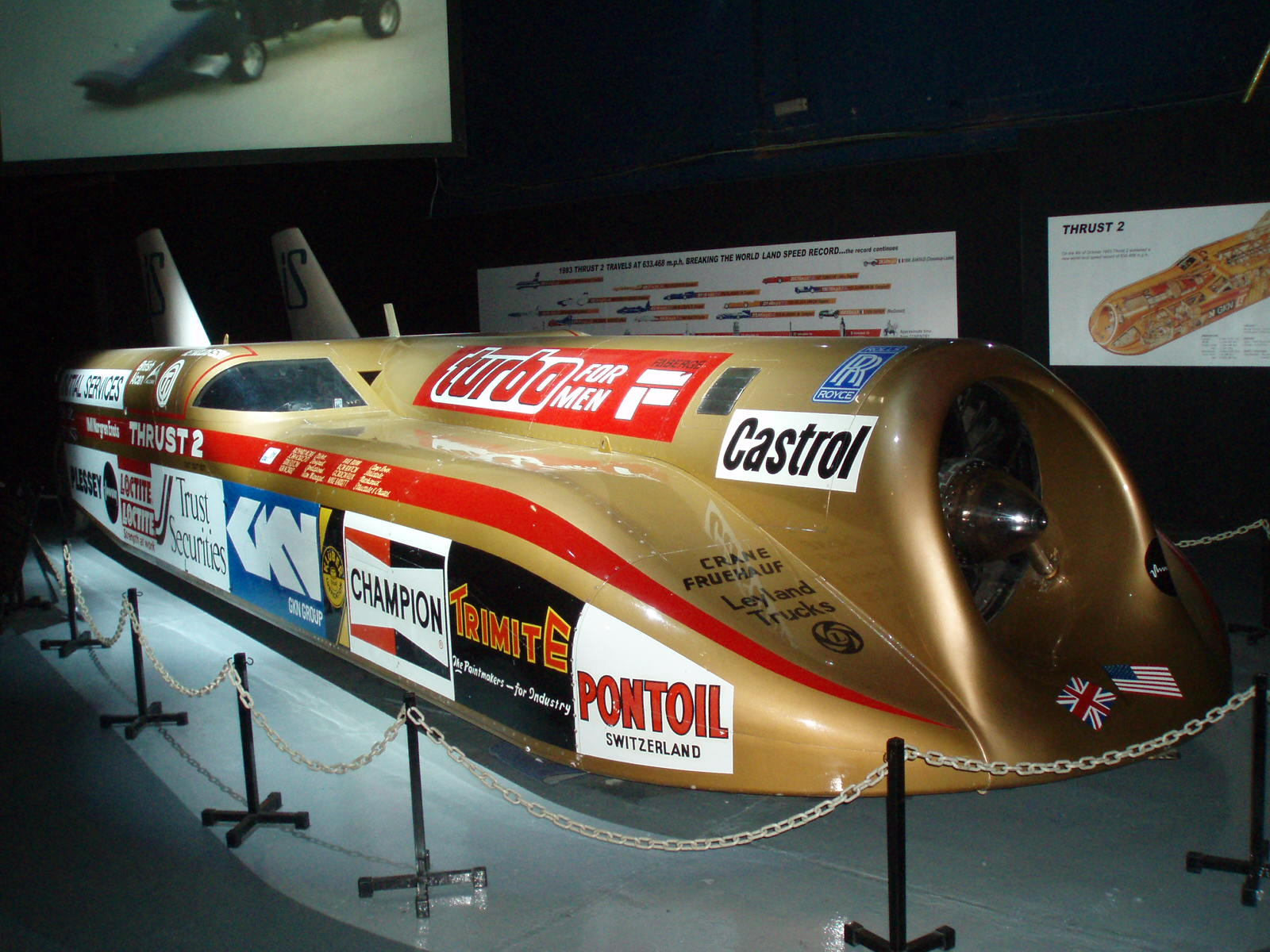
- Thrust2 on display in the Coventry Transport Museum

Overview
- Manufacturer: SSC Programme Limited
- Designer: John Ackroyd

Body and chassis
- Class: Land Speed Record vehicle

Powertrain
- Engine: Rolls-Royce Avon

Dimensions
- Curb weight: 10.6 tonnes

Chronology
- Predecessor: Blue Flame
- Successor: ThrustSSC

Thrust2 is a British jet car, which held the world land speed record from 4 October 1983 to 25 September 1997. (Note: This was achieved at the Black Rock Desert in Nevada, US.)

The Thrust2 is powered by a single Rolls-Royce Avon jet engine sourced from an English Electric Lightning, and has a configuration somewhat resembling that of the mid-1960s-era J79 turbojet-powered land speed record cars of Art Arfons, collectively known as the "Green Monster" cars.

== History ==
=== Conception ===
The “Land Speed Record” (LSR), which was valid for 12 years, 11 months and 11 days at that time, was 622.407 mph (1,001.667 km/h) over one mile (with a flying start). The record was set on October 23, 1970, by the American Gary Gabelich with Blue Flame, a rocket car on the Bonneville Salt Flats. Richard Noble stepped up to "bring back this record for Britain".

The time it took Richard Noble from the idea to the first concept to the successful record attempt was nine years. In 1977, the Thrust2 project was officially presented at the Motorfair 1977 at London's Earls Court.

In 1978, the design and construction of Thrust2 began. The hired designer, John Ackroyd, who initially trained in Saunders Roe and also worked on the Enfield 8000 electric car, retired to an abandoned cottage on the Isle of Wight for the design studies, Construction was undertaken at Ranelagh Works in Fishbourne.

=== Early stages and Thrust1 ===
Noble's plan was to build three vehicles: The first vehicle (Thrust1) was intended as a pure "test platform" for parts development and turbine tests, and was not intended for the record attempt.

Then a "demonstration car" should be built with the second vehicle (Thrust2), with which the interest of potential sponsors should be aroused. As a special highlight, this car was designed as a two-seater with an additional cabin on the left-hand side of the vehicle. Noble wanted to impress passengers / sponsors with runs up to 200 miles per hour (approx. 320 km / h) and win them over to his project. The last thing that was planned was the actual record-breaking vehicle (Thrust3).

Thrust1 completed its first high-speed run on March 7, 1977. The first run was performed with a standing start at idle thrust and gradual acceleration and had an estimated top speed of about 180 mph (about 290 km / h). The second run was a so-called drag start, in which the thrust against the brakes is built up and then released. At approximately 140 mph, a rear wheel bearing stuck, the vehicle slewed sideways and overturned several times. Since this "triple roll" mostly took place in the air and the car landed on its side, the damage to the vehicle itself was relatively minor and Noble was also uninjured. The Rolls-Royce Derwent engine with its protruding combustion chambers had sustained the large portion of the damage. The jet pipe was torn off and at least one combustion chamber was destroyed.

Thrust1 was never used again and the wreck was sold to a scrap dealer for £175. Despite this setback, Noble was not discouraged and saw this as completing the first step in his original plan. After a new calculation of the financial situation, Noble came to the decision to streamline the project. The levels Thrust2 (as a marketing tool) and Thrust3 (as an emergency vehicle) were merged, and the further development work was placed in the hands of John Ackroyd.

== Overview of the results achieved with Thrust2 ==
On 4 October 1983, the car reached a top speed of 650.88 mph (1,047.49 km/h) and broke the record at 633.468 mph (1,019.468 km/h) (average speed of two runs within one hour).

KTVN TV (Reno, Nevada) reporter/photographers Michael Hagerty and Gary Martin covered the record setting attempt in the days leading up to the record. The car was unceremoniously stored under a tarpaulin in the only automotive garage at Black Rock desert when it wasn't being worked on by the team. A propane torch was used to burn the line straight down the hard cracked dirt of the desert for the driver to follow. No other cars were allowed to approach the race track except on the perpendicular lest the driver accidentally follow those car tracks as a different path through the measured mile.

In the record attempt on October 3, the following results were achieved in detail:

Year	Date	Location	Driver	Vehicle	mph	km/h	Footnotes
1983	October 4	Black Rock Desert	Richard Noble	Thrust2	633.468	1019.468	the recognized record, averaged from the two runs over the measured mile
1983	October 4	Black Rock Desert	Richard Noble	Thrust2	624.241	1004.619	The result of the first run
1983	October 4	Black Rock Desert	Richard Noble	Thrust2	642.971	1034.762	The result of the second run
1983	October 4	Black Rock Desert	Richard Noble	Thrust2	650.88	1047.490	the fastest individual run that the vehicle has ever completed (without "back-up" within an hour)

== Technical data and vehicle information ==
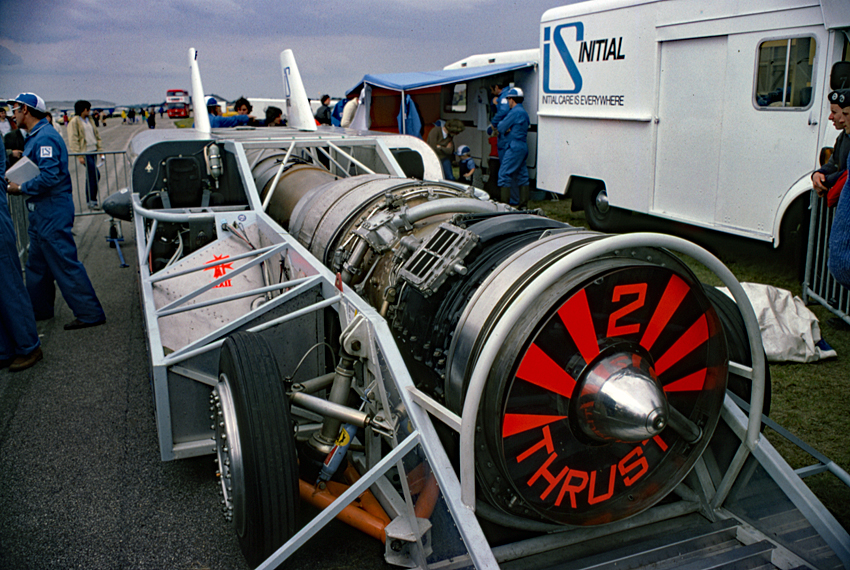
Thrust2 chassis without the cladding at the Bournemouth Air Show in 1980

- Thrust2 is powered by a Rolls-Royce RB.146 (Avon302C) jet turbine that delivers 72 kN of thrust. At 1,100 km/h (680 mph) this corresponds to an output of 22,000 kW (30,000 hp).
- Thrust2 is 8,331 mm (328.0 in) long and 2,540 mm (100 in) wide and 2,134 mm (84.0 in) high including the tail fins. The vehicle alone has a height of 1.30 m (4 ft 3 in).
- The wheelbase is 6.35 m (20.8 ft), the front axle track is 2,007 mm (79.0 in) and that of the rear axle is 2,464 mm (97.0 in). The turning circle of Thrust2 is 45.7 m (150 ft).
- The vehicle has a ground clearance of 127 mm (5.0 in).
- The car's two tanks can hold a maximum of 563.7 L (124.0 imp gal; 148.9 US gal) of “Jet A 1” kerosene fuel.
- The total weight is 3,900 kg (8,600 lb).
- Thrust2 is designed as a two-seater with a second cabin on the left side of the vehicle in order to offer paying passengers or sponsors a "ride-along" opportunity up to 200 mph.

== Data and information on the record attempts ==
- It took Thrust2 about 59 seconds to accelerate from standstill to 650 miles per hour (1,046.07 km/h): in about 9 seconds, to 200 miles per hour (321.87 km/h), after about 20 seconds 400 miles per hour (643.74 km/h), and 40 seconds to reach 600 miles per hour (965.61 km/h).
- The rubber tires visible in some pictures and film recordings were only put on to protect the highly sensitive aluminum disc wheels from damage during towing.
- At around 300 mph (480 km/h) the tail fins began to stabilize the vehicle, which was previously difficult to control (“all over the place”), so that it could run smoothly in a straight line.
- At a speed of about 600 mph (970 km/h), a shock wave began to build up in front of the vehicle, which appeared as “fog” around the car and was later described by Noble as “something really worth seeing”.
- The total fuel consumption for each record run was approximately 60 imp gal (270 L; 72 US gal) per minute.
- After the overrun cut-off when crossing the finish line, Thrust2 still had to coast down to a speed of 375 miles per hour (603.50 km/h) before the three braking parachutes, each 7 ft 7 in (2.30 m) in diameter, could be used.

== After breaking the record ==
When the car was offered for sale at £90,000 in 1991, an extensive fundraising campaign was organised without government assistance to keep the car in Britain. The bid was successful, and today Thrust2 and its successor, ThrustSSC, are displayed at the Coventry Transport Museum in Coventry, England.

In 1997, Thrust2's record was broken by Richard Noble's follow up car, ThrustSSC, with a top speed of 1,228 km/h (763 mph).

== Notes ==
Achievements
Preceded by Blue Flame; 630.478 MPH, 1,014.656 Km/h set by Gary Gabelich, on 23 October 1970.	FIA Outright World Land Speed Record holder (1 km); 634.051 MPH, 1,020.406 Km/h set by Richard Noble, on 4 October 1983.	Succeeded by ThrustSSC; 760.343 MPH, 1,149.055 Km/h set by Andy Green, on 25 September 1997.
Preceded by Blue Flame; 622.407 MPH, 1,001.667 Km/h set by Gary Gabelich, on 23 October 1970.	FIA Outright World Land Speed Record holder (1 mile); 633.47 MPH, 1,019.47 Km/h set by Richard Noble, on 4 October 1983.	Succeeded by ThrustSSC; 763.035 MPH, 1,149.303 Km/h set by Andy Green, on 25 September 1997.
