= Turbonique =

American automotive components manufacturer

- Company type: Corporation
- Industry: Automotive
- Founded: 1962
- Founder: Gene Middlebrooks
- Fate: Defunct
- Headquarters: Orlando, Florida

Turbonique was a company founded in 1962 by Clarence Eugene "Gene" Middlebrooks Jr of Orlando, Florida. Middlebrooks, born 3 August 1931, was a native of Jonesboro, Georgia, had studied mechanical engineering at Georgia Tech and had worked for aerospace contractor Martin-Marietta on the propulsion system for the Pershing missile program.

The company specialized in products built around very compact low cost gas turbines built for high power output during brief periods. The turbine was fuelled by an isopropyl nitrate monopropellant that they sold under the brand name "Thermolene". In addition to the fuel, the main products sold by the company were:

- Micro turbine engines, ranging from the 42 hp (31 kW) "S-2" up to the 1,000 hp (750 kW) "S-28", weighing only 120 pounds (54 kg).
- A special version "S-28" micro turbine engine was the "TB-28", the "drag axle". It was mounted directly to the rear axle of a vehicle, supplementing the power of the conventional engine, usually driving the axle via a Borg Warner sprag clutch, and was intended for drag racing. The price for a complete unit was US$4,695. Power output was stated as up to 1,300 hp (970 kW), and it was essentially an on/off device.
- "AP", for Auxiliary Power, piston engine supplemental superchargers driven by its own micro-turbine which could be engaged by a switch. Four different sizes were offered. The device was heavily based on Middlebrook's patent US 2963863 "Drive Control Means For a Turbo-Compressor Unit". Unlike conventional superchargers and turbos, no engine power would be used to supply the extra air, and testing on a Chevy 409 engine was reported to give a power gain from 405 hp (302 kW) to 835 hp (623 kW) with the supercharger engaged.
- Rocket thrust engines, in various sizes. The "T-16" had 300 lbf (1,300 N) of thrust. One application was for drag racing gokarts, posting times of 7.3 seconds and speeds over 150 mph (240 km/h) for the quarter mile using a twin T-16 engine rocket powered kart driven by "Captain" Jack McClure. There were also higher powered models, like the T-21, T-22 and T-32. They were used to power cars, motorcycles (Evel Knievel planned to use one for a jump over Grand Canyon) as well as boats and more.

The company was mostly based on mail order, and was a frequent advertiser in magazines, using gramophone records and 8mm film in addition to a catalog as promotional material. A 1955 VW Beetle named the "Black Widow", clocking 9.36 second (168 mph (270 km/h) quarter miles equipped with a Turbonique drag axle at the Tampa Dragstrip in 1965, occurred frequently in advertisements. When it crashed, becoming airborne after reaching 183 mph (295 km/h), this event was also advertised, saying "we forgot our strength for a split second".

Being based on rocket fuel and technology, there were a number of safety issues with these devices. For instance if the operator let off the throttle, then reapplied it, the device would essentially become a bomb. In 1967, after a few reported incidents and fatalities, the NHRA banned the use of Turbonique turbines for drag racing.

In 1968, Middlebrooks was accused and jailed for mail fraud mostly based on the goods supplied by Turbonique being more difficult and more expensive to finish and install than described in the advertisements. At the trial, Middlebrooks waived counsel and represented himself. An appeal in 1972, stating that he suffered from hypomania at the time, was rejected. The company folded shortly after the court case. Middlebrooks died on 4 August 2005.
