= Sammy Miller Motorcycle Museum =

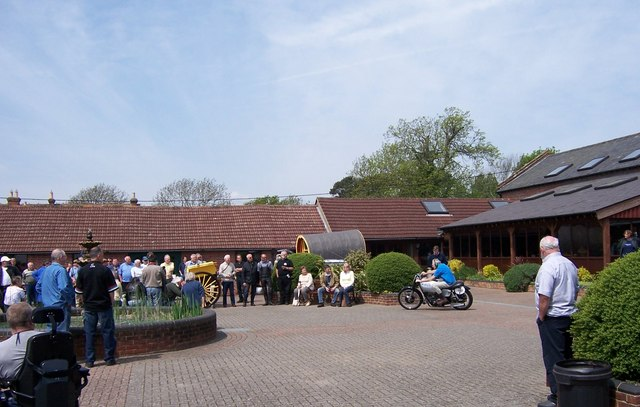
- Established: 1964
- Location: New Milton, Hampshire
- Coordinates: 50.7656°N 1.6733°W
- Type: Motorcycle Museum
- Website: Sammy Miller Motorcycle Museum website

The Sammy Miller Motorcycle Museum is an independent museum in New Milton, Hampshire, England. It was set up in 1964, after the former championship winning observed trials rider Sammy Miller set up a parts business in New Milton.

The business started after Miller put a few of his old racing motorcycles in the corner, which eventually became the catalyst of the present day museum. The museum is now held in trust, houses some 300 machines including motorcycles and 3-wheeled vehicles and is affiliated to the British Motorcycle Charitable Trust.

The collection includes Vincent/H.R.D., BSA, Zundapp, Norton and Moto Guzzi motorcycles.

In 2020 a two-storey 10,000 square feet (930 m^{2}) extension was added and the museum's collection reorganised.

== See also ==
- Outline of motorcycles and motorcycling
