= Coventry Transport Museum =

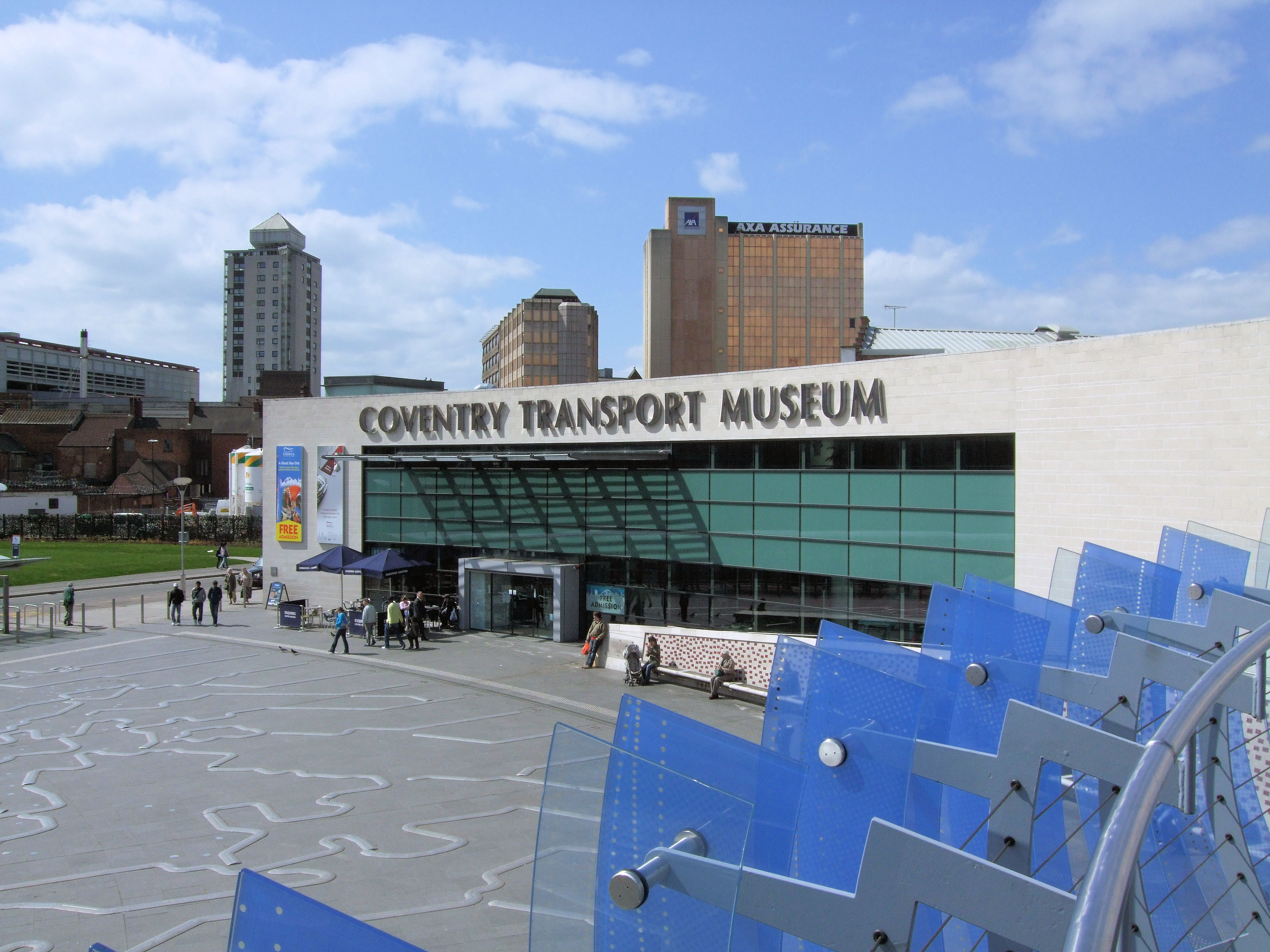

- Location in the West Midlands
- Established: 1980; 46 years ago
- Location: Coventry, England
- Coordinates: 52°24′39″N 1°30′33″W
- Type: Transport museum
- Director: Paul Breed
- Public transit access: Coventry railway station Pool Meadow Bus Station
- Website: www.transport-museum.com

Coventry Transport Museum (formerly known as the Museum of British Road Transport) is a transport museum, located in Coventry city centre, England.

It houses the largest collection of British-made road transport held in public ownership. It is located in Coventry because the city was previously the centre of the British car industry. There are more than 240 cars and commercial vehicles, 100 motorcycles, 200 bicycles.

The ever-changing temporary exhibitions feature motor cars, commercial vehicles, cycles and motorcycles from the museums own collection and beyond. The museum offers activities ranging from engineering challenges to scientific experiments.

The museum is also home to a 60 year old Vintage Sleigh Ride, that has been popular in the city for generations of local residents.

It has a full-time archive department, which deals with an array of historical items, and offers a public enquiry service answering questions and finding items and information. Visitors need to contact the museum prior to visiting should they wish to access the archives, or speak to a curator.

== Exhibits ==
Notable exhibits in the museum are Thrust2 and ThrustSSC, the British jet cars which broke the land speed record in 1983 and 1997, respectively, and some of the royal cars – Queen Mary's and King George V's State limousines.

Coventry Transport Museum's £8.5 million redevelopment project in which 12 of the museum's 14 galleries were completely transformed was completed in 2015, the project was funded by the Heritage Lottery Foundation, European Development Fund, Biffa Award and Garfield Weston. As part of the museum's redevelopment project, both Thrust SSC and Thrust 2 cars were relocated by specialist haulier from their position in the museum's Spirit of Speed Gallery to the new Biffa Award Land Speed Record Gallery which opened in 2015.

Many mass-produced cars are in the collection, including an Austin Allegro, an Austin Metro previously owned by Lady Diana Spencer, a Ford Escort MK2, Hillman Imp, Triumph Acclaim, Talbot Sunbeam, Talbot Horizon, Peugeot 206 and Peugeot 405. Many of the vehicles on display were either produced in Coventry or produced by companies which had a presence in Coventry at some stage.

A Humber staff car used by General Montgomery during the Second World War is also on display.

The museum displays many Jaguars and other Coventry built cars such as the Triumph, Humber and Standard marques, an Alvis tank, Massey Ferguson tractors, and Coventry built buses, including the bus that the Coventry City football team paraded in after their victory in the 1987 FA Cup Final. Coventry motorcycle marques are also represented in the museum's collection including: Triumph, Francis-Barnett, Rudge-Whitworth and Coventry-Eagle and it is affiliated to the British Motorcycle Charitable Trust.
