= Westinghouse J46 =

Turbojet aircraft engine family

J46
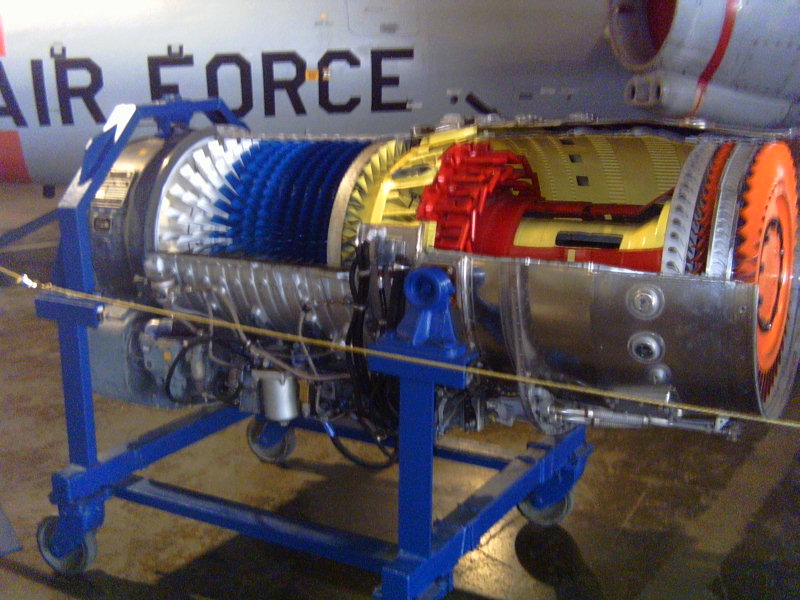
- J46-WE-8 cutaway
- Type: Afterburning Turbojet
- National origin: United States
- Manufacturer: Westinghouse Aviation Gas Turbine Division
- Major applications: Convair F2Y Sea Dart; Vought F7U Cutlass
- Developed from: Westinghouse J34

The Westinghouse J46 is an afterburning turbojet engine developed by the Westinghouse Aviation Gas Turbine Division for the United States Navy in the 1950s. It was primarily employed in powering the Convair F2Y Sea Dart and Vought F7U Cutlass. The engine also powered the land speed-record car known as the Wingfoot Express, designed by Walt Arfons and Tom Green It was intended to power the F3D-3, an improved, swept-wing variant of the Douglas F3D Skyknight, although this airframe was never built.

== Design and development ==
The J46 engine was developed as a larger, more powerful version of Westinghouse's J34 engine, about 50% larger. The Westinghouse model number was a continuation of the "X24C" series of the J34. The model number assigned was X24C10, even though the J46 differed in many design features from the smaller J34. It was seen as a lower development risk than the Westinghouse J40 which was in parallel development at the same time.

The development program ran into many problems with this engine, including the original electronic control system, compressor/turbine mismatches, combustion instability and control issues at altitude leading to compressor stalling The produced -8, -8A and -8B engines were all derated from the original design specification on both thrust and specific fuel consumption.

The engine's 12-stage compressor was driven by two turbine stages on a single shaft. Early development engines included a simple "eyelid" afterburner, actuated by control rods that ran the length of the engine. By the time the engine reached production, the rear nozzle had an iris-type "petal" design. The same long control rods now pushed or pulled a ring that ran on rollers, which in turn opened or closed the iris. The original design, using an electronic control system, would have allowed continuous adjustment of afterburner thrust from minimum to maximum. This was abandoned when the electronic control could not be made acceptably reliable; the final afterburner was an "ON/OFF" unit.

== Variants ==
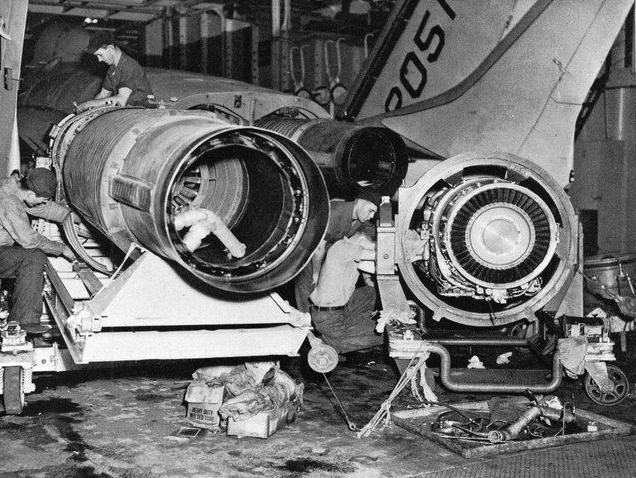
Maintenance on the J46s of a F7U Cutlass aboard USS Hancock (CVA-19), 1957

Thrust given in foot-pounds (lbf) and kilonewtons (kN).

J46-WE-2
J46-WE-3
3,980 lbf (17.7 kN) Proposed for the Douglas X-3 Stiletto. Failed to exit testing due to thrust shortfalls.
J46-WE-4/-10
3,980 lbf (17.7 kN) The non-A/B version of the J46-WE-2/-8B. Proposed for the Douglas F3D-3 Skyknight but did not go into production because of schedule slippage and the F3D-3 cancellation.
J46-WE-8
3,980 lbf (17.7 kN) / 5,800 lbf (26 kN) with afterburner Powered both the Vought F7U-3 and F7U-3M Cutlass.
J46-WE-8A
5,800 lbf (26 kN) with after burning. Powered the F7U-3 Cutlass. All -8A engines were upgraded to the -8B build standard after being produced.
J46-WE-8B
4,600 lbf (20 kN) / 6,000 lbf (27 kN) with afterburner. Powered the F7U-3 Cutlass giving a 680 mph (1,095 km/h) max speed. This variant also powered the Harvey Hustler, a speed boat designed to go faster than 275 mph.
J46-WE-12
4,500 lbf (20 kN) / 6,100 lbf (27 kN) with afterburner. Powered the Convair YF2Y-1 Sea Dart hydroski aircraft. Basically identical to the -8/-8B, the aircraft was equipped with a fresh water spray system that flushed salt deposits out of the engine before takeoff and after shutdown.
J46-WE-18
6,100 lbf (27 kN) with afterburner. Proposed for the A2U-1 attack aircraft, an attack variant of the F7U. Canceled with the aircraft program.

== Applications ==
- Convair F2Y Sea Dart
- Douglas X-3 Stiletto (intended)
- Vought F7U Cutlass

== Surviving engines ==
- Smithsonian National Air and Space Museum, Exhibit 1971-0911, J46-WE-8B, Serial WE405773, 15 total running hours, including acceptance testing and 3 flights in an F7U-3. In storage.
- Green Mamba dragster owned by Doug Rose in Tampa, Florida

== Specifications (J46-WE-8) ==
Data from

==== General characteristics ====
- Type: afterburning turbojet
- Length: 198 in (5.0 m)
- Diameter: 28 in (0.86 m)
- Dry weight: 2116 lb (952.5 kg)

==== Components ====
- Compressor: single-spool, 12-stage axial
- Combustors: annular, walking stick evaporators
- Turbine: 2-stage turbine
- Fuel type: JP-4, JP3 or avgas
- Oil system: wet sump in accessories gearcase, 3.25 US gallons (12.3 L)

==== Performance ====
- Maximum thrust: 3,980 pounds-force (17.7 kN) dry, 5,800 pounds-force (26 kN)) afterburning. A "modernization" program replaced many parts on production J46-WE-8B and J46-WE-8 engines to give higher thrust and longer turbine life. On tests fully modernized engines approached 6,000 pounds-force (27 kN)) of thrust. No updated specification was issued to cover such engines. Thrusts and SFC's here are for the official approved specification guarantees.
- Overall pressure ratio: 5.32:1
- Air mass flow: 73 lb/s (33 kg/s)
- Turbine inlet temperature: 1,525 °F (829 °C)
- Specific fuel consumption: 1.088 lb/(lbf⋅h) (30.8 g/(kN⋅s)) dry; 2.40 lb/(lbf⋅h) (68 g/(kN⋅s)) wet
- Thrust-to-weight ratio: 2.3:1 dry, 2.9:1 afterburning

== See also ==
Related development

- Westinghouse J34
- Westinghouse J40

Related lists

- List of aircraft engines
