= Craig Breedlove =

American race driver (1937–2023)

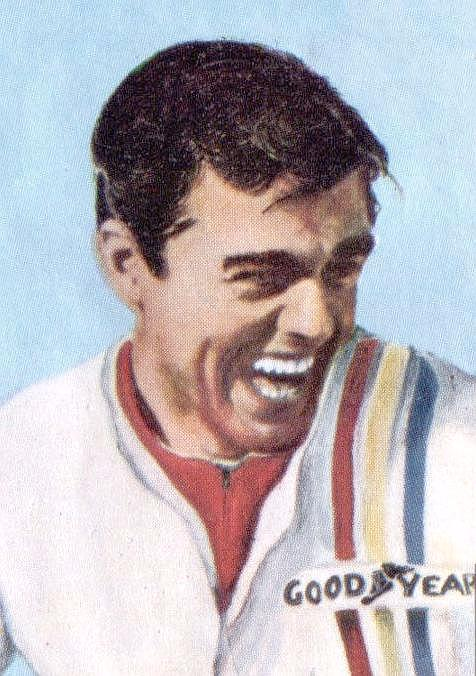
- Breedlove in a 1968 illustration
- Born: March 23, 1937
- Died: April 4, 2023 (aged 86); Rio Vista, California, U.S.
- Education: Venice High School
- Occupation: Professional race car driver
- Known for: Five-time world land speed record holder and survivor of the world's fastest car crash; Spirit of America
- Spouses: Margaret Kastler (divorced); Lee Roberts (m. 1962; div. 1968); 3 other spouses (divorced); Yadira (m. 2002)
- Children: 3

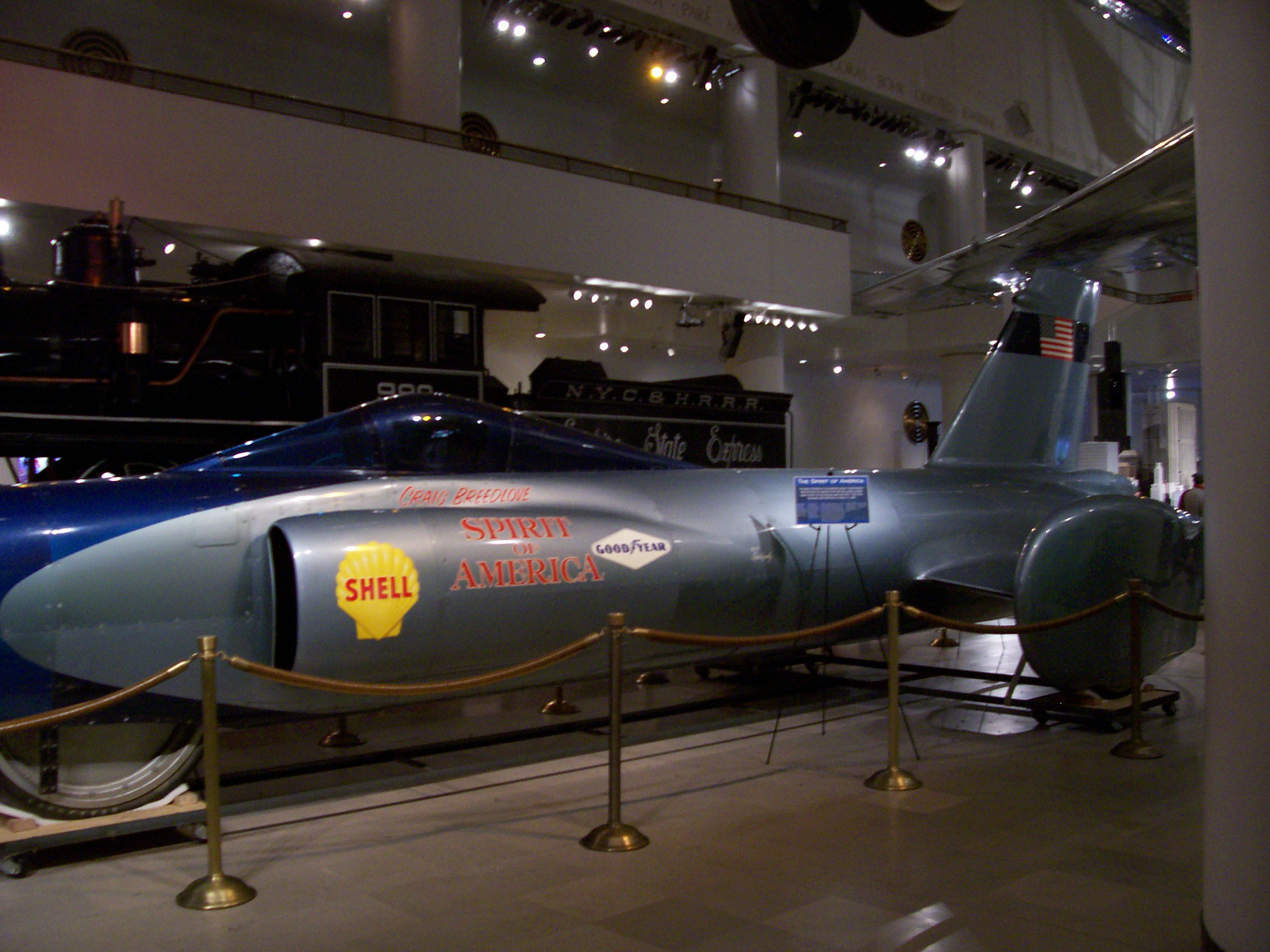
Spirit of America originally on exhibit at the Museum of Science and Industry in Chicago

Norman Craig Breedlove Sr. (March 23, 1937 – April 4, 2023) was an American professional race car driver and a five-time world land speed record holder. He was the first person in history to reach 500 mph (800 km/h), and 600 mph (970 km/h), using several turbojet-powered vehicles, all named Spirit of America.

== Land vehicle speed records ==
In 1962, Breedlove made his first attempt, in a freewheeling tricycle (ignoring FIA rules requiring four wheels, at least two driven; in the event, FIM happily accepted it) powered by a General Electric J47 turbojet engine. On August 5, 1963, this first Spirit made its first record attempt, using just 90% of available thrust to reach 388.47 mph (625.18 km/h) over the measured mile. The return pass, on 95% power, turned up a two-way average of 407.45 mph (655.73 km/h). Spirit of America was so light on the ground that it did not even need to change tires afterward.

For 1964, Breedlove faced competition from Walt Arfons' Wingfoot Express (piloted by Tom Green), as well as from brother Art Arfons in his four-wheel, FIA-legal Green Monster. With more engine power, Breedlove upped the record to 468.72 mph (754.33 km/h) "[w]ith almost insolent ease", then to 526.28 mph (846.97 km/h), making him the first man to exceed 500 mph (800 km/h). This pass was not without incident, however, for one of his drogue parachute's shroud lines parted, and Spirit of America ran on for 5 mi (8.0 km) before hitting a telegraph pole and coming to rest in a lake. This record stood all of twelve days before Green Monster broke it, recording a two-run average of 536.71 mph (863.75 km/h).

In response, Breedlove built an FIA-legal four-wheeler, Sonic I, powered by a 15,000 lbf (67 kN) J79 turbojet. November 2, 1965, Breedlove entered the FIA record book with a two-run average of 555.483 mph (893.963 km/h). This lasted even less time than before, for Green Monster came back five days later at 576.553 mph (927.872 km/h). On November 15, Breedlove responded with a 600.601 mph (966.574 km/h) record (after turning in an amazing 608.201 mph (978.805 km/h) return pass), which held until 1970. (It would be broken by Gary Gabelich's Blue Flame, which reached 630.388 mph (1,014.511 km/h).) To take the record back, Breedlove planned a supersonic rocket car, "complete with ejector seat." Also in 1965, Breedlove's wife, Lee Breedlove, took the seat in Sonic 1, making four passes and achieving 308.506 mph (496.492 km/h), making her the fastest woman alive, and making them the fastest couple, which they remain. According to the author Rachel Kushner, Craig had talked Lee into taking the car out for a record attempt to monopolize the salt flats for the day and block one of his competitors from making a record attempt.

During 1968, Lynn Garrison, President of Craig Breedlove & Associates, started to package a deal that saw Utah's Governor, Calvin Rampton, provide a hangar facility for the construction of a supersonic car. Bill Lear, of Learjet fame, was to provide support, along with his friend Art Linkletter. Playboy magazine hoped to have the car painted black, with a white bunny on the rudder. TRW was supplying a lunar lander rocket motor. A change in public interest saw the concept shelved for some time. They also negotiated for the use of the late Donald Campbell's wheel-driven Bluebird CN7 record-breaker.

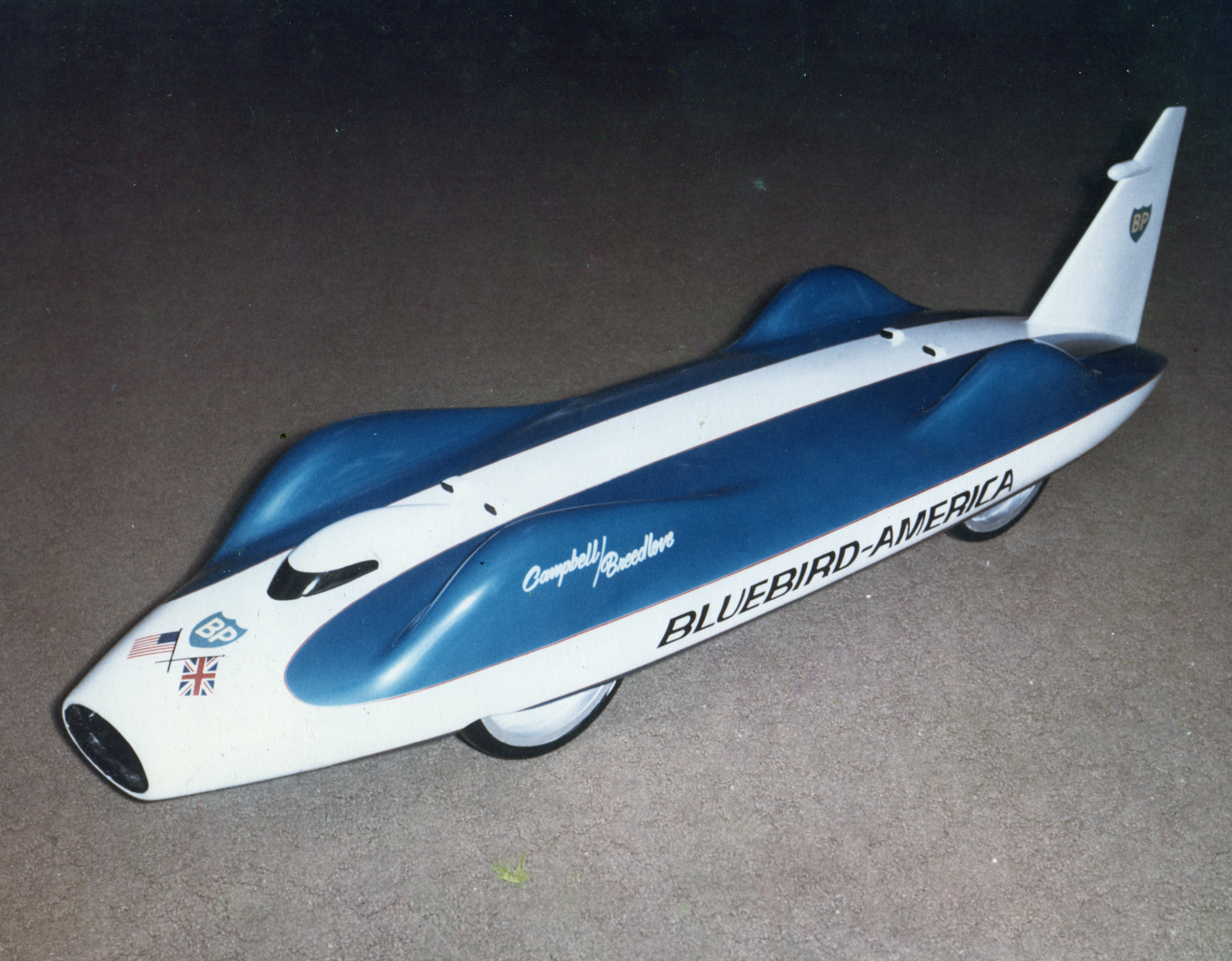
Lynn Garrison, as President of Craig Breedlove & Associates, obtained permission to use Bluebird on the Utah Salt Flats. This model was used in publicity

After a lengthy break from world records and making his name as a real estate agent, Breedlove began work on a new Spirit in 1992, eventually named Spirit of America Formula Shell LSRV. The vehicle is 44 ft. 10 in. long, 8 ft. 4 in. wide, and 5 ft. 10 in. high (13.67 m by 2.54 m by 1.78 m) and weighs 9,000 lb (4,082 kg), construction is on a steel tube or space frame with an aluminium skin body. The engine is the same as in the second Spirit, a J79, but it is modified to burn unleaded gasoline and generates a maximum thrust of 22,650 lbf (100.75 kN).

The second run of the vehicle on October 28, 1996, in the Black Rock Desert, Nevada, ended in a crash at around 675 mph (1,086 km/h), which remains the fastest survived (Breedlove was unhurt) automobile accident. Breedlove also managed to perform a u-turn at around 535 mph (861 km/h), which is also a world record Returning in 1997, the vehicle badly damaged the engine on an early run and when the British ThrustSSC managed over 700 mph (1,100 km/h), the re-engined Spirit could do no better than 676 mph (1,088 km/h). Breedlove believed the vehicle was capable of exceeding 800 mph (1,300 km/h), but was never tested.

In late 2006, Breedlove sold the car to Steve Fossett, who planned to attempt the land speed record in 2007. Fossett died in a plane crash in 2007, and the car was put up for sale. Breedlove's vehicle, renamed the "Sonic Arrow", was rolled out on the Black Rock Desert for a photo opportunity on October 15, 2007. The car is now on permanent display in the Wings Over the Rockies Air and Space Museum.

== Endurance and speed records for AMC ==
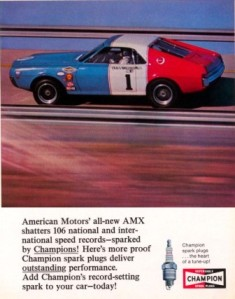
An ad promoting Breedlove shattering speed records in a production AMC AMX

Breedlove was put on the payroll at American Motors Corporation (AMC) in 1968 to prepare the automaker's pony and high-performance cars, the Javelin and the AMX, for speed and endurance records.

In January 1968, one month before the official introduction of the AMX model, Breedlove, his wife Lee, and Ron Dykes, established fourteen United States Automobile Club (USAC) and Fédération Internationale de l'Automobile (FIA) certified speed records for cars of any engine size, and 106 national and international speed and endurance records for cars with less than 488 cu in (8.0 L).

Two cars were prepared for the endurance speed runs on a five-mile banked track in Texas. The shattered records included a Class C AMX (the No. 2 Lee Breedlove car) with the standard 290 cu in (4.8 L) AMC V8 engine (bored to 304 cubic inches) with a 4-speed manual transmission, achieving a 24-hour average of 140.79 mph (226.58 km/h) that was set by Craig and his wife Lee. New records in a Class B AMX (the No. 1 Craig Breedlove car) using the optional 390 cu in (6.4 L) "AMX" V8 (397 cubic inches) with a 3-speed automatic transmission, that included a 75-mile (121 km) distance with a flying start at 174.295 mph (280.501 km/h), as well as a 173.044 mph (278.487 km/h) over a 100-mile (161 km) distance from a standing start.

After the cars were displayed at the Chicago Auto Show in February 1968, Breedlove took the AMX to Bonneville. He established a USAC sanctioned record of 189 mph (304 km/h) as well as an unofficial run of over 200 mph (320 km/h).

Later in the year, American Motors entered three similarly equipped Javelins with 343 cu in (5.6 L) AMC V8 engines in the C/Production class at Bonneville. The racing class limits modifications to aerodynamics, but requires changes for safety and also allows engine modifications. The cars included Edelbrock cross-ram "STR-11" intake manifolds with two Holley carburetors, special cylinder heads that were modified by Joe Mondello (an engine builder who became known for Oldsmobile engines) as well as "Doug's" exhaust manifolds, and "Crower" camshafts. During November 1968, the "Speed Spectacular Javelin" run by Breedlove was the fastest, reaching 161.73 mph (260.28 km/h) establishing a speed record that stood for several years.

== Death ==
Breedlove died on April 4, 2023, at the age of 86, at home in Rio Vista, California. The cause of death was cancer, his wife, Yadira Breedlove, said.

== Awards and legacy ==
In 1993, Breedlove was inducted into the Motorsports Hall of Fame of America and in 2000 into the International Motorsports Hall of Fame. In 2009, he was inducted into the Automotive Hall of Fame.

The Beach Boys' song "Spirit of America" was "inspired by Breedlove's land speed record, set in 1963."

== Land vehicle speed records ==
- August 5, 1963 – Breedlove reached 407.45 mph (655.73 km/h) in Spirit of America at Bonneville Salt Flats, Utah, thus earning him the land speed record.
- October 13, 1964 – Breedlove reached 468.719 mph (754.330 km/h) in Spirit of America at Bonneville, reclaiming the record from Art Arfons.
- October 15, 1964 – Just two days later, Breedlove broke his own record and breached the 500 mph barrier at 526.277 mph (846.961 km/h), in Spirit of America at Bonneville.
- November 2, 1965 – Breedlove reached 555.483 mph (893.963 km/h) in Spirit of America Sonic I at Bonneville, reclaiming the record from Art Arfons.
- November 15, 1965 – Thirteen days later, Breedlove breached the 600 mph barrier at 600.601 mph (966.574 km/h) in Spirit of America Sonic I at Bonneville.
