= Wingfoot Express =

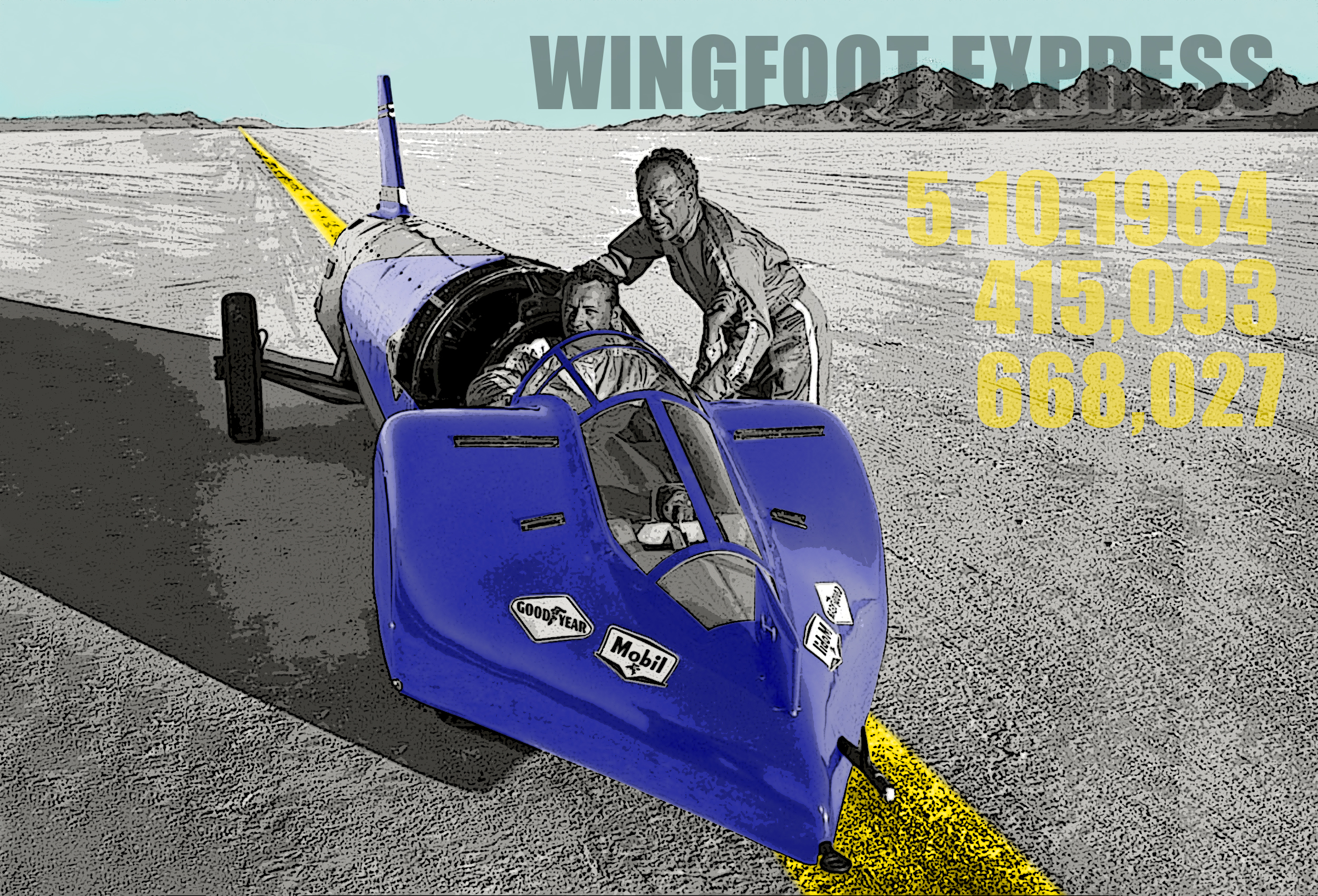

Overview
- Production: 1964
- Designer: Walt Arfons

Body and chassis
- Body style: Custom Made One-Off
- Related: Green Monster

Powertrain
- Engine: Westinghouse J46

Dimensions
- Curb weight: 4,000 lb (1,800 kg)

Chronology
- Successor: Green Monster

The Wingfoot Express was a jet car which set the land speed record on October 2, 1964, with a speed of 413.20 mph (664.98 km/h). Designed by Walt Arfons and Tom Green, it was driven during the record run by Green, after Arfons suffered a heart attack just prior. The Express was powered by a Westinghouse J46 engine.

== History ==
At a trade fair in Gary, Indiana in 1962, Arfons met Green, chief engineer for a torque wrench manufacturer. Although Green's only racing experience had been a year of stock car racing in New Mexico ten years previously, he was greatly interested in aerodynamics; this dovetailed perfectly with Arfons' interest in racing mechanics, and "Within ten minutes we were planning our assault on the world's land speed record" Green recalls.

Green shortly provided plans for a three-wheeled land speed record car, which had to be changed to four wheels to meet FIA rules; from there on there was little change until the car was finished. Green's emphasis was on reducing aerodynamic drag by lowering the drag coefficient and, especially, reducing frontal area by narrowing the track and using smaller wheels. His calculations indicated that the readily available surplus Westinghouse J46 jet engines would have more than enough power to drive the vehicle to over 400 miles per hour (640 km/h).

In order to find funding, Arfons and Green approached Goodyear, who were already funding Craig Breedlove's Spirit of America. In a presentation to 13 Goodyear executives Green emphasized his aerodynamic analyses, estimating that the wheel-driven Bluebird CN7 would be limited to 400 mph (640 km/h) and Nathan Ostich's revolutionary jet-powered Flying Caduceus to only 360 mph (580 km/h), but that their design should hit 480 mph (770 km/h), the target Breedlove was also going for. Although Spirit of America had a lower coefficient of drag, Green's design had a smaller frontal area and weighed slightly more than half as much. This, along with a thrust of 7,000 pounds force (31 kN) available from the J46 engine with afterburner, compared to only 4,400 pounds force (20 kN) available from Breedlove's J47 engine would make their design viable.

When the Flying Caduceus frustrated Ostich's team by refusing to go any faster than 355 miles per hour (571 km/h), Green's mastery of the subject was evident enough that Goodyear decided to fund his project in addition to Breedlove's; thus the name, Wingfoot Express, from Goodyear's trademark winged foot, inspired by a statue of Mercury. (In 1964 Bluebird CN7 demonstrated a final speed of over 440 mph, even when limited by poor surface conditions, invalidating Green's estimate.) However, although Spirit Of America had a $250,000 budget and Bluebird CN7 more than $2,000,000, Arfons and Green's car cost only $78,000.

Wingfoot Express' cockpit was located centrally, just behind the front axle, covered with an acrylic glass canopy from in front of the driver's feet to behind his head. The front wheels were mounted within the bodywork barely further apart than the width of the engine, while the rear wheels were on outriggers and exposed to the air. Green estimated that the aerodynamic drag of the exposed rear wheels cost the car 20 miles per hour (32 km/h), but since his calculations indicated that they already had much greater speed available than they needed, this was not viewed as a problem. A small fin rose vertically at the tip of the car's nose.

Veteran drag racer Arfons was to drive the car for the record attempt, but a month before the scheduled run, during initial testing on a dragstrip with Arfons outside the car observing, the two braking parachutes ripped loose and the car "knifed through a chain link fence at 200 mph (320 km/h), ripped across a highway, jumped two four-foot (1.2 m) ditches and plunged 75 feet (23 m) into a wooded area. Only 300 feet (91 m) of fence that had become entangled in her rear wheels stopped her", according to Green. Although the driver was unhurt "when Walt saw the Wingfoot heading for oblivion he had a heart attack on the spot" and was briefly hospitalized, but released himself in order to repair the car. In the process, he damaged the ligaments in one hand, eliminating whatever small chance remained of his driving the car for the record. At this point there was no time to find another driver, and Green, who had never driven over 130 miles per hour (210 km/h) in his life, was the logical choice because of his familiarity with the mechanics of the vehicle. At Bonneville, Green began his Land Speed Record career by easing the car around "the parking area" like any student driver. On his first timed run he hit 236 miles per hour (380 km/h), but "I hadn't fully anticipated that I'd have the feeling of rattling and banging down the black line like a rock in a can...the salt was a little rough....". "at 250 mph [400 km/h] the upholstery of the seat hugged me like a pressure suit, at 275 [440 km/h] I had the weird feeling it was snowing in the cockpit!" The "snow" was flakes of salt which were being sucked into the cockpit by the vagaries of the aerodynamics; aside from being distracting, this brought up fears that the air pressure might crack or even completely shatter or remove the cockpit at speed. At higher speed, the short front axle began to oscillate, necessitating an increase in the damping of the shock absorbers; but after that last modification, Green found that he could steer with one hand; "I never drifted more than 8 feet [2.4 m] from the black line". The first run using the afterburner sent the car well over 300 miles per hour (480 km/h); when it was shut down Green felt as if he had "slammed on the brakes, but the airspeed indicator showed that I was still accelerating under regular engine power". That run hit 335 miles per hour (539 km/h) before salt crystals drawn into the engine threw it off balance. Having only three days total booked at Bonneville, the team had to vacate for Craig Breedlove, who set the record at 400 miles per hour (640 km/h); leading to an intense debate within the FIA about what constituted a car, resulting in the unusual decision that Breedlove's three-wheeled jet vehicle was actually a motorcycle.

In 1964, Wingfoot Express returned to Bonneville for a week, but the engine never regained the strength shown in their earliest runs, and struggled to pick up speed. Even when another engine was installed, success eluded them. Finally, Walt's brother and longtime competitor Art Arfons, a brilliant intuitive mechanic for both piston and jet engines, suggested that the 17 inches (430 mm) opening of the "clamshells" on the engine exhaust was the problem. "it was a 1/16 turn of the idle adjustment on the engine and opening of the afterburner clamshells to 19 inches (480 mm) that brought the engine up to record performance", Green recalls. Green also removed some of the sheet metal around the engine intake, later realizing that in the process he had destroyed the Goodyear logo. But the Wingfoot Express now easily hit 299 miles per hour (481 km/h) with no afterburner. On the last day they had available, October 2, 1964, at 4:06 pm, a short blast of afterburner brought the car to a recorded 406 mph (653 km/h), but the official record required the run be "backed up" in the opposite direction. The lateness of the hour left no time for refueling, so the decision was made to save fuel by not making a full run over the entire distance for acceleration, and the car started the return run only 2 miles (3.2 km) away from the timing lights. Green and the car accelerated like a rocket, recording a remarkable speed of 420.07 miles per hour (676.04 km/h), thus averaging 413.20 miles per hour (664.98 km/h) in both directions and setting a new record not quite 2% faster than Breedlove's.

Within 3 days, however, the record had been reset by Art Arfons. Although the final record run had demonstrated that Wingfoot Express clearly had much more speed available, Green decided to not push his luck and retired from competition, returning to his regular job. He is today a vice president of the company, which used to produce torque wrenches for Snap-On. He continues to maintain contact with Arfons and they meet periodically. "I did offer to help Walt with his rocket car but the design was his own".

Walt Arfons went on alone to build Wingfoot Express 2 using solid-fuel rockets; peak power and acceleration was enormous, but could not be maintained long enough to set a record over the measured distance. Wingfoot Express 2 started with 10 JATO rocket bottles, and made an unofficial speed record of 605 mph with 25 JATO bottles in 1965.

Neither knows what happened to the original Wingfoot Express, or where it might now be.
