= Wingfoot =

Wingfoot may refer to:

- Wingfoot (album), a 2012 album by alternative hip hop artist Noah23
- Wingfoot Air Express Crash, a Goodyear blimp that crashed in Chicago in 1919
- Akron Wingfoots, a basketball team
- Wingfoot Commercial Tire Systems, a division of Goodyear Tire and Rubber Company
- Wingfoot Express, a jet-propelled car
- Aragorn, a character from The Lord of the Rings
- Wyatt Wingfoot, a fictional Native American
- Wingfoot One, a Goodyear Blimp
