= Farer =

British watch brand

- Trade name: Farer Limited
- Type: Limited company
- Industry: Horology
- Headquarters: London
- Number of locations: 2
- Website: farer.com

Farer is a British watch brand established in 2015. Its watch names are typically explorer or land speed record themed.

The company operates in Ascot, Berkshire.

== History ==
In 2015 Farer was founded by Stuart Finlayson, Jono Holt, Ben Lewin and Paul Sweetenham to create a range of quartz watches. Previously, Sweetenham worked as a watch buyer for a duty-free company and then had an extensive retail career, Holt, Lewin and Finlayson ran a London-based branding and marketing agency.

Farer's first product line consisted of nine quartz watches.

In September 2016, the brand added three automatic watches to its range, naming them after British Royal Navy ships used by British explorers. Their automatic watches’ winding crowns were uniquely made of pure Bronze, which patinate with age and wear.

The brand released a range of GMT and Diving watches (Aqua Compressors) in 2017, and then a range of 37 mm hand-wound cushion-cased watches in 2018. In 2019, they released two land speed record themed quartz watches, named after Ainsdale and Pendine Sands. Later, that year, they released a range of chronograph watches.

== Manufacture ==
Farer designs its watches in London, while Swiss manufacturer, Roventa Henex, produces the final product in Bienne, Switzerland.

Farer's Beagle, Hopewell and Endurance models use ETA 2824-2 movements.
