= FireForce (jet car) =

Jet car

FireForce 1 FireForce 2 FireForce 3 FireForce 4 FireForce 5

Overview
- Production: 1989-present

Body and chassis
- Class: Jet car

Powertrain
- Engine: Pratt & Whitney J60 turbojet

Dimensions
- Wheelbase: 280 in (7,112.0 mm) (FireForce 5)
- Curb weight: 1,200–1,750 lb (544–794 kg)

FireForce is the name of a series of jet-powered cars that have been produced since 1989. The first four cars, FireForce 1, FireForce 2, FireForce 3, and FireForce 4, are jet-powered funny cars. The fifth car, known as FireForce 5, is a jet-propelled dragster. They are all powered by Pratt & Whitney J60 turbojet engines, producing 5,500 lbf (24 kN) of thrust, or around 10,000 hp (7,500 kW).
