= Tom Green (designer) =

American car designer & driver

Tom Green worked with Walt Arfons to design and drive the Wingfoot Express, a jet-powered land speed record car. Green drove the car to a world record speed 413.20 mph (664.98 km/h) on October 2, 1964. Green's world record is often forgotten, as the mark was eclipsed three times in less than two weeks, including the first to break the 500 mph (800 km/h) threshold.

Green was chief engineer for a torque wrench manufacturer. Although Green's only racing experience had been a year of stock car racing in New Mexico ten years previously, he was greatly interested in aerodynamics. This dovetailed perfectly with Arfons' interest in racing mechanics. The two met at a trade fair in Gary, Indiana in 1962, and Green recalls that "Within ten minutes we were planning our assault on the world's land speed record".

Green shortly provided plans for a three-wheeled land speed record car, which had to be changed to four wheels to meet FIA rules; from there on there was little change until the car was finished. Green's emphasis was on reducing aerodynamic drag by lowering the drag coefficient and, especially, reducing frontal area by narrowing the track and using smaller wheels. His calculations indicated that the readily available surplus Westinghouse J46 jet engines would have more than enough power to drive the vehicle to over 400 mph (640 km/h).

In order to find funding, Arfons and Green approached Goodyear. Green's mastery of aerodynamics was evident enough that Goodyear decided to fund his project; thus the name, Wingfoot Express, from Goodyear's trademark winged foot.

Wingfoot Express' cockpit was located centrally, just behind the front axle, covered with an acrylic glass canopy from in front of the driver's feet to behind his head. The front wheels were mounted within the bodywork barely further apart than the width of the engine, while the rear wheels were on outriggers and exposed to the air. Green estimated that the aerodynamic drag of the exposed rear wheels cost the car 20 mph (32 km/h), but since his calculations indicated that they already had much greater speed available than they needed, this was not viewed as a problem. A small fin rose vertically at the tip of the car's nose.

Veteran drag racer Arfons was to drive the car for the record attempt, but a month before the scheduled run he damaged the ligaments in one hand, eliminating his chance of driving the car for the record. At this point there was no time to find another driver, and Green, who had never driven over 130 mph (210 km/h) in his life, was the logical choice because of his familiarity with the mechanics of the vehicle.

At Bonneville, Green began his Land Speed Record career by easing the car around "the parking area" like any student driver. He followed with runs of 236 mph (380 km/h), 250 mph (400 km/h) and 275 mph (443 km/h).

Green’s first run using the afterburner sent the car to 335 mph (539 km/h) before salt crystals drawn into the engine threw it off balance. At this point, the team had exhausted the three days it had booked at Bonneville

In 1964, Wingfoot Express returned to Bonneville for a week. On the last day they had available, October 2, 1964, Green and the car accelerated like a rocket, averaging 413.199 mph (664.979 km/h) in both directions and setting a new record.

Within 3 days, however, the record had been reset by Art Arfons. Although the final record run had demonstrated that Wingfoot Express clearly had much more speed available, Green decided to not push his luck and retired from competition, returning to his regular job. He is today a vice president of the company which produces wrenches for Snap-On. He continues to maintain contact with Arfons and they meet periodically. "I did offer to help Walt with his rocket car but the design was his own".
