= Pioneer 1 (land speed racer) =

Overview
- Production: 1960

Chronology
- Successor: Pioneer 2M

Pioneer 1 is a Soviet FIA Group VII land speed record car built in 1960 under the guidance of sportsman and engineer Ilya Aleksandrovich Tikhomirov. Derived from the Kharkov-L1, the body was aluminum and the wheels made from magnesium alloy. It was powered by two gas turbine engines (1,000 hp (746 kW) each at 50,000 rpm) mounted either side of the driver.

The second stage of each turbine drove a planetary reduction gearbox, mated to a central driving unit pirated from the Kharkov-L1. The turbines were fitted with a water-methanol injection system.

Pioneer 1 weighed in at 485 kg (1,069 lb), making it eligible for FIA Class 1 (500 kg (1,100 lb) and under). It was claimed to have set a Class 1 record of 303 km/h (188 mph) for the measured kilometer at the Baskunchak dry salt lake, and was the first Soviet land speed racer to exceed 300 km/h (186 mph).

In 1962, the power of the engines was increased to 1,350 hp (1,000 kW), while weight rose to 495 kg (1,091 lb). The improved car raised the Class 1 and Soviet national records for the measured kilometer to 306.6 km/h (190.5 mph).

In 1963, Tikhomirov modified Pioneer 1 even further, to create Pioneer 2M.

== See also ==
- List of vehicle speed records
