= Convair F2Y Sea Dart =

Hydroski jet fighter, U.S. Navy, 1953

F2Y Sea Dart
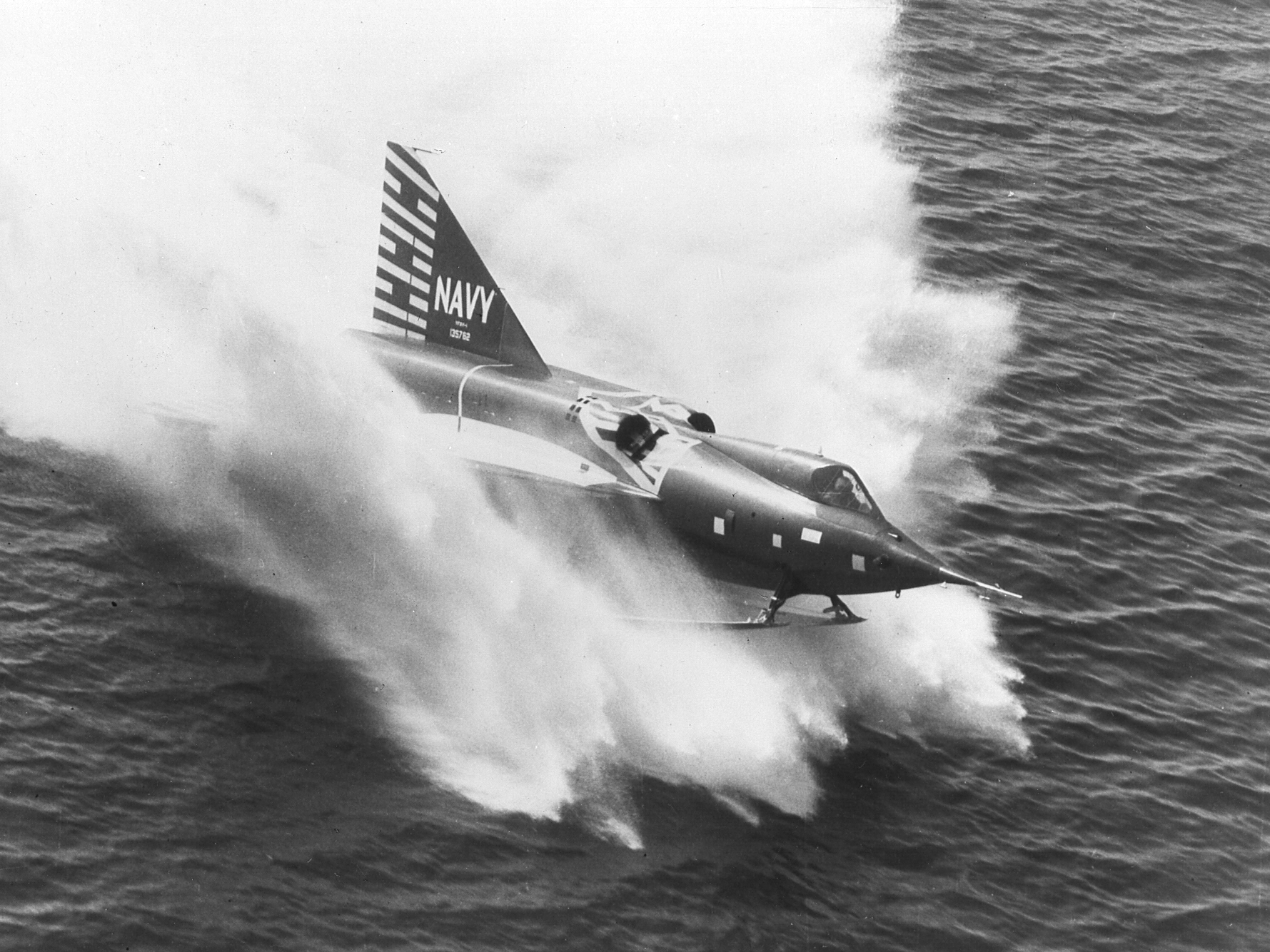
- An F2Y Sea Dart with dual-ski configuration

General information
- Type: Seaplane fighter
- National origin: United States
- Manufacturer: Convair
- Primary user: United States Navy
- Number built: 5

History
- First flight: 14 January 1953
- Retired: 1957

The Convair F2Y Sea Dart is an American seaplane fighter aircraft that rode on one or two hydro-skis during takeoff and landing. It flew only as a prototype, and never entered mass production. It is the only seaplane to have exceeded the speed of sound.

It was created in the 1950s, to overcome the problems with supersonic planes taking off and landing on aircraft carriers. The program was canceled after a series of unsatisfactory results and a tragic accident on 4 November 1954, in which test pilot Charles E. Richbourg was killed when the Sea Dart he was piloting disintegrated in midair. The four surviving planes were retired in 1957, but some were kept in reserve until 1962.

== Development ==
The Sea Dart began as Convair's entry in a 1948 U.S. Navy contest for a supersonic interceptor aircraft. At the time, there was much skepticism about operating supersonic aircraft from carrier decks. In order to address this issue, the U.S. Navy ordered many subsonic fighters. The worry had some foundation, since many supersonic designs of the time required long takeoff rolls, had high approach speeds, and were not very stable or easy to control—all factors that were troublesome on a carrier.

Ernest Stout's team at Convair's hydrodynamic research laboratory proposed to put a Delta Dagger on water skis.

Convair's proposal gained an order for two prototypes in late 1951. Twelve production aircraft were ordered before a prototype had even flown. No armament was ever fitted to any Sea Dart built, but the plan was to arm the production aircraft with four 20mm Colt Mk12 cannon and a battery of folding-fin unguided rockets. Four of this order were redesignated as service test vehicles, and an additional eight production aircraft were soon ordered as well.

== Design ==
The aircraft was to be a delta-winged fighter with a watertight hull and twin retractable hydro-skis for takeoff and landing. When stationary or moving slowly in the water, the Sea Dart floated with the trailing edge of the wings touching the water. The skis were not extended until the aircraft reached about 10 miles (16 km) per hour during its takeoff run.

The required power was supplied by a pair of afterburning Westinghouse XJ46-WE-02 turbojets, fed from intakes mounted high above the wings to avoid ingesting spray. When these engines were not ready for the prototypes, twin Westinghouse J34-WE-32 engines of just over half the power were installed.

=== Ski configurations ===
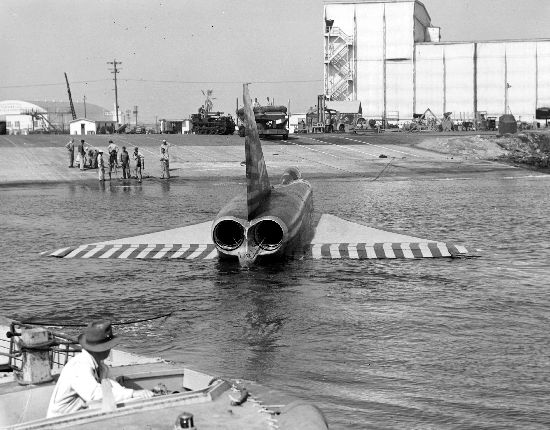
The F2Y demonstrating its position in the water at rest

The prototype was fitted with an experimental single ski, which proved more successful than the twin-ski design of the second service test aircraft. Testing with several other experimental ski configurations continued with the prototype through 1957, after which it was placed into storage.

The US was not the only country to consider the hydroski. The Saunders-Roe company of the United Kingdom, which had already built an experimental flying boat jet fighter, first flying in 1947 the SR.A/1, tendered a design for a ski-equipped fighter, but little came of it.

=== Submarine carriage ===
In the 1950s, the US Navy considered the internal arrangements of a submarine aircraft carrier that could carry three of these aircraft. Stored in pressure chambers that would not protrude from the hull, they would be raised by a portside elevator just aft of the sail and set to take off on their own on a smooth sea but catapulted aft in a higher sea. The program only reached the "writing on a napkin" stage, for two problems were not addressed: the hole for the elevator would have seriously weakened the hull and the load of a laden elevator would also be difficult to transmit to the hull structure.

== Operational history ==
The aircraft was built in Convair's San Diego facility at Lindbergh Field and was taken to San Diego Bay for testing in December 1952. On 14 January 1953, with E. D. "Sam" Shannon at the controls, the aircraft inadvertently made its first short flight during what was supposed to be a fast taxi run; its official maiden flight was on 9 April.

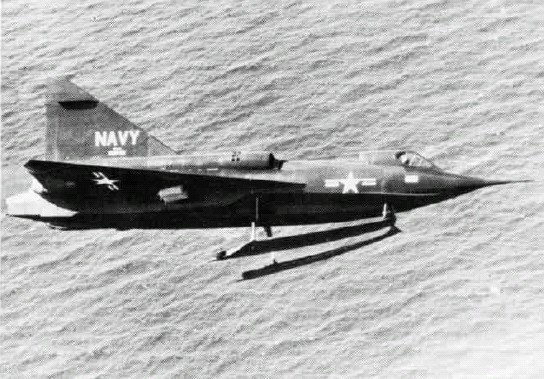
An XF2Y-1 in flight with skis deployed

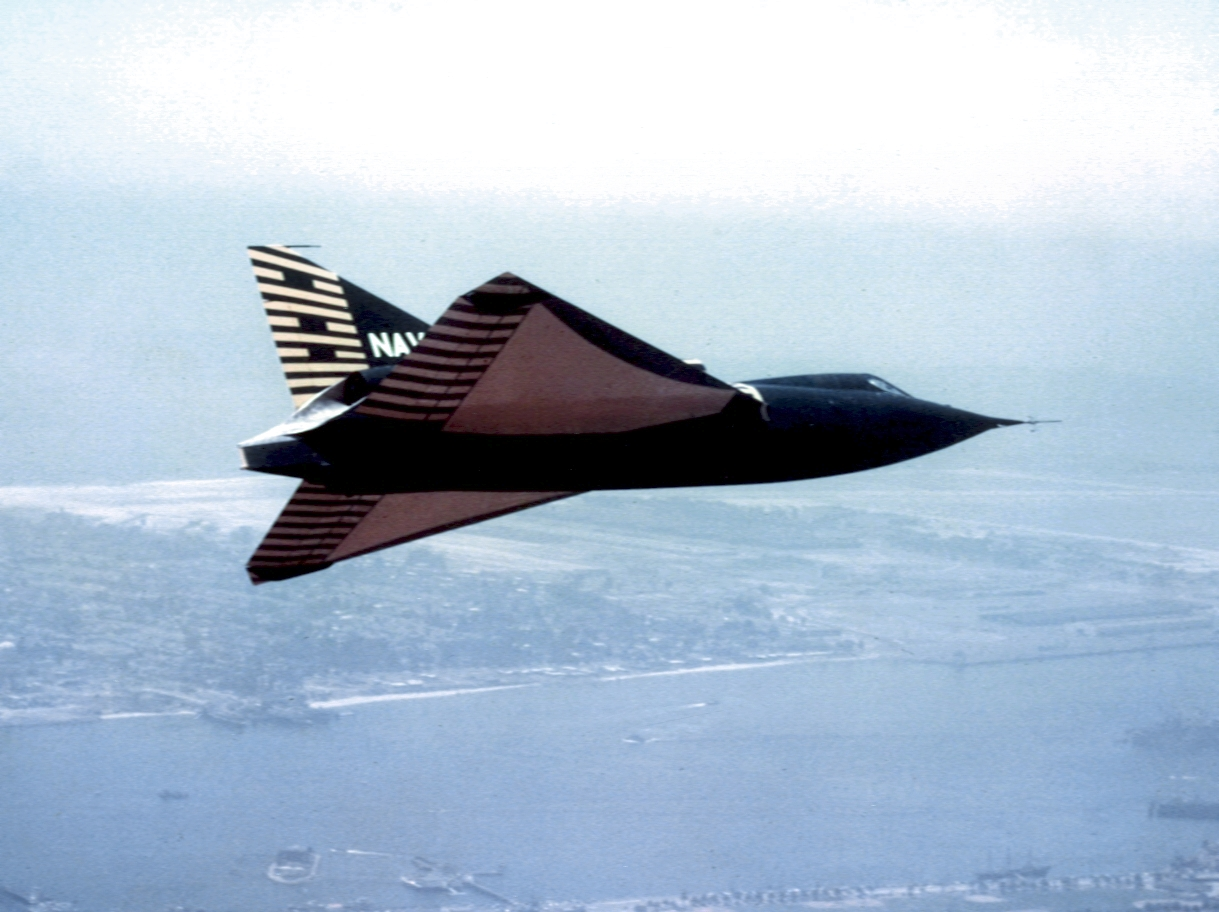
An XF2Y-1 in flight over San Diego

The underpowered engines made the fighter sluggish, and the hydro-skis were not as successful as hoped; they created violent vibration during takeoff and landing, despite the shock-absorbing oleo legs they were extended on. Work on the skis and legs improved this situation somewhat, but they were unable to resolve the sluggish performance. The Sea Dart proved incapable of supersonic speed in level flight with the J34 engines; not helping was its pre-area rule shape, which meant higher transonic drag.

The second prototype was canceled, so the first service test aircraft was built and flown. This was fitted with the J46 engines, which performed below specification. However, speeds in excess of Mach 1 were attained in a shallow dive with this aircraft, making it the only supersonic seaplane to date. On 4 November 1954, Sea Dart BuNo 135762 disintegrated in midair over San Diego Bay during a demonstration for naval officials and the press, killing Convair test pilot Charles E. Richbourg when he inadvertently exceeded the airframe's limitations.

Even before that, the Navy had been losing interest (problems with supersonic fighters on carrier decks having been overcome) and the crash relegated the Sea Dart program to experimental status. All production aircraft were cancelled, though the remaining three service test examples were completed. The two final prototypes never flew.

=== Redesignation ===
Despite the fact that the airplane was officially retired and had not flown since 1957, at least one F2Y was still in storage as of 1962. As a result, it was redesignated YF-7A under the 1962 United States Tri-Service aircraft designation system.

== Operators ==
United States

- United States Navy

== Aircraft on display ==
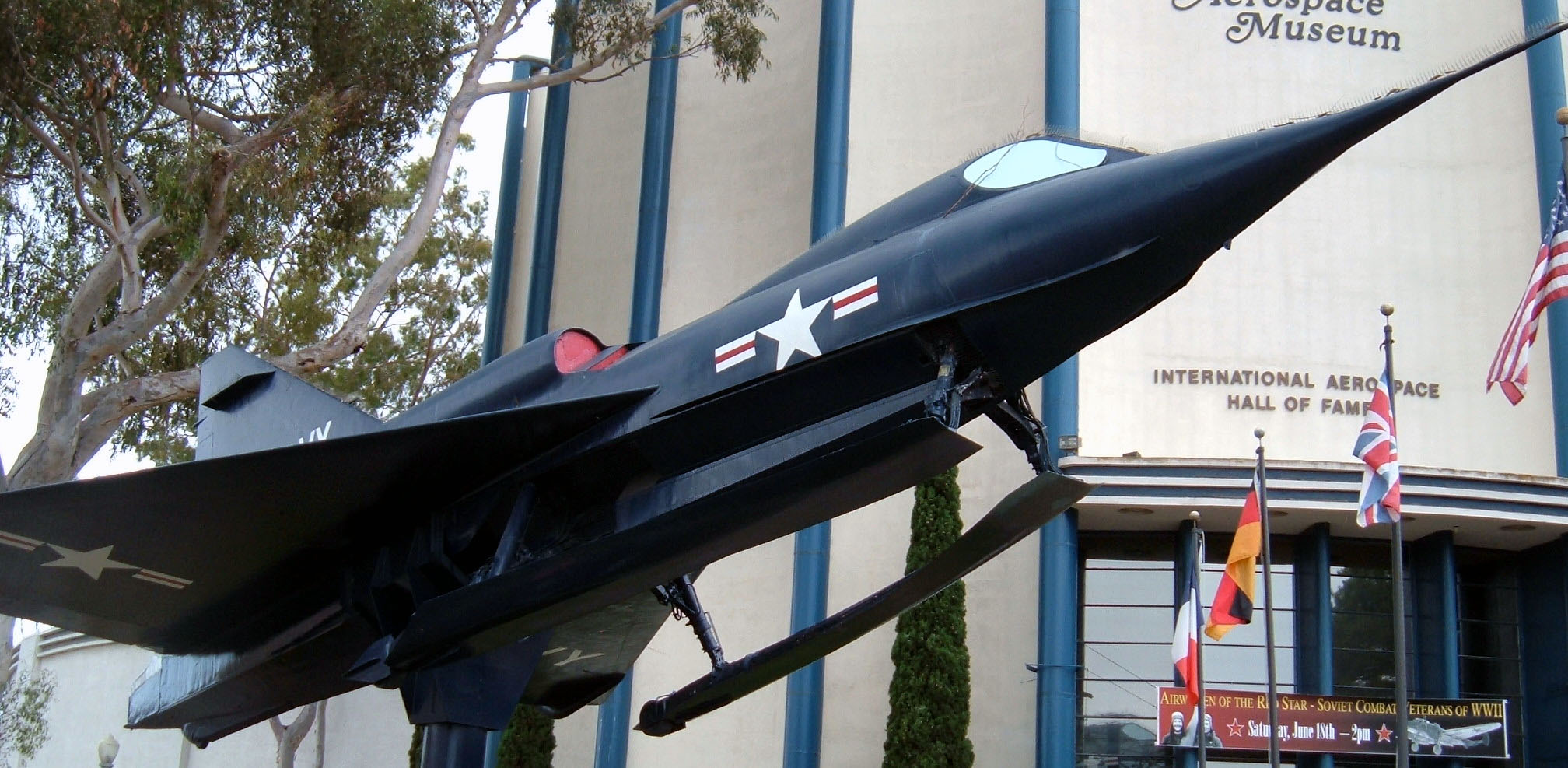
Sea Dart at the San Diego Aerospace Museum

All four remaining Sea Darts survive to this day.

- XF2Y-1 Sea Dart, Bureau Number 137634, is in bad shape due to a mistake with a crane and is awaiting restoration for the Smithsonian Institution in Washington D.C.
- YF2Y-1 Sea Dart, Bureau Number 135763, is on display at the San Diego Air & Space Museum in Balboa Park. It is on loan from the National Museum of Naval Aviation at NAS Pensacola.
- YF2Y-1 Sea Dart, Bureau Number 135764, is on display at the Wings of Freedom Aviation Museum at NAS Willow Grove, Pennsylvania. It is on loan from the National Museum of Naval Aviation at NAS Pensacola.
- YF2Y-1 Sea Dart, Bureau Number 135765, is on display at the Florida Air Museum that is part of the Sun 'n Fun complex at Lakeland Linder International Airport, Florida.

== Specifications (YF2Y-1 135763) ==
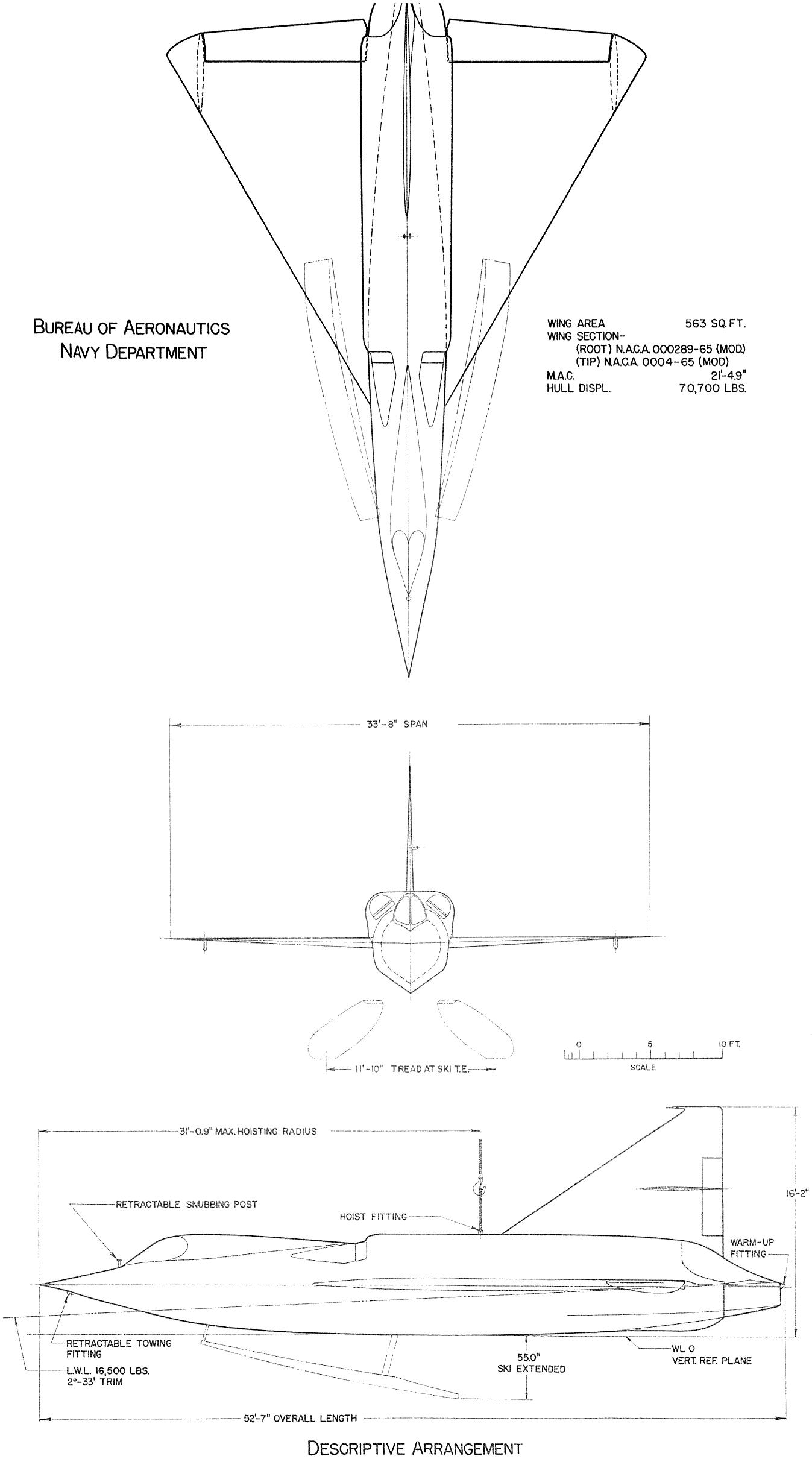
3-view line drawing of the Convair Y2-2

Data from Naval Fighters #23 : Convair XF2Y-1 And YF2Y-1 Sea Dart

General characteristics

- Crew: 1
- Length: 51 ft 1.5 in (15.583 m)
- Wingspan: 35 ft 4 in (10.77 m)
- Width: 5 ft 5 in (1.65 m) fuselage / hull beam
- Draught (skis retracted): 40 in (1,000 mm)
- Draught (skis extended): 96.5 in (2,450 mm)
- Height: 16 ft (4.9 m) on 3-point beaching gear

7 ft 5 in (2.26 m) aircraft in horizontal rigging position

- Wing area: 568 sq ft (52.8 m^{2})
- Aspect ratio: 1.02
- Airfoil: root: NACA 0003.30-65 (mod.) 3% thickness; tip (station 173.7): NACA 0004-65 (mod.) 4% thickness; average thickness 3.83%
- Empty weight: 16,725 lb (7,586 kg)
- Gross weight: 24,373 lb (11,055 kg)
- Fuel capacity: 1,000 US gal (830 imp gal; 3,800 L) usable fuel + 6.5 US gal (5.4 imp gal; 25 L) unusable fuel
- Powerplant: 2 × Westinghouse J46-WE-12B afterburning turbojet engines, 4,500 lbf (20 kN) thrust each dry, 6,100 lbf (27 kN) with afterburner

XF2Y-1 137634 2x Westinghouse J34-WE-32 3,400 lbf (15,000 N) (dry only)

Performance

- Maximum speed: 695 mph (1,118 km/h, 604 kn) at 8,000 ft (2,400 m)

825 mph (717 kn; 1,328 km/h) at 36,000 ft (11,000 m)

- Maximum speed: Mach 1.25
- Range: 513 mi (826 km, 446 nmi)
- Rate of climb: 17,100 ft/min (87 m/s)
- Time to altitude: 35,000 ft (11,000 m) in 1 minute 42 seconds
- Wing loading: 29 lb/sq ft (140 kg/m^{2})
- Thrust/weight: 0.56 (max. loaded); 0.96 (empty)
- Take-off run: 5,500 ft (1,700 m)
- Landing run: 1,500 ft (460 m)
- Take-off time in calm air: 35 seconds
- Landing speed at 20° alpha: 130 mph (113 kn; 209 km/h) in landing configuration with 10% fuel

Armament

- Guns: 4x fixed forward-firing 20 mm (0.787 in) Colt Mk 12 cannon (production aircraft)
- Rockets: Fin-Folding Aerial Rockets (production aircraft)
- Missiles: 2 × air-to-air missiles (production aircraft)

== See also ==
Related development

- Convair XF-92
- F-102 Delta Dagger
- F-106 Delta Dart

Aircraft of comparable role, configuration, and era

- Saunders-Roe SR.A/1

Related lists

- List of flying boats and floatplanes
