= Green Monster (automobile) =

Land speed record vehicle

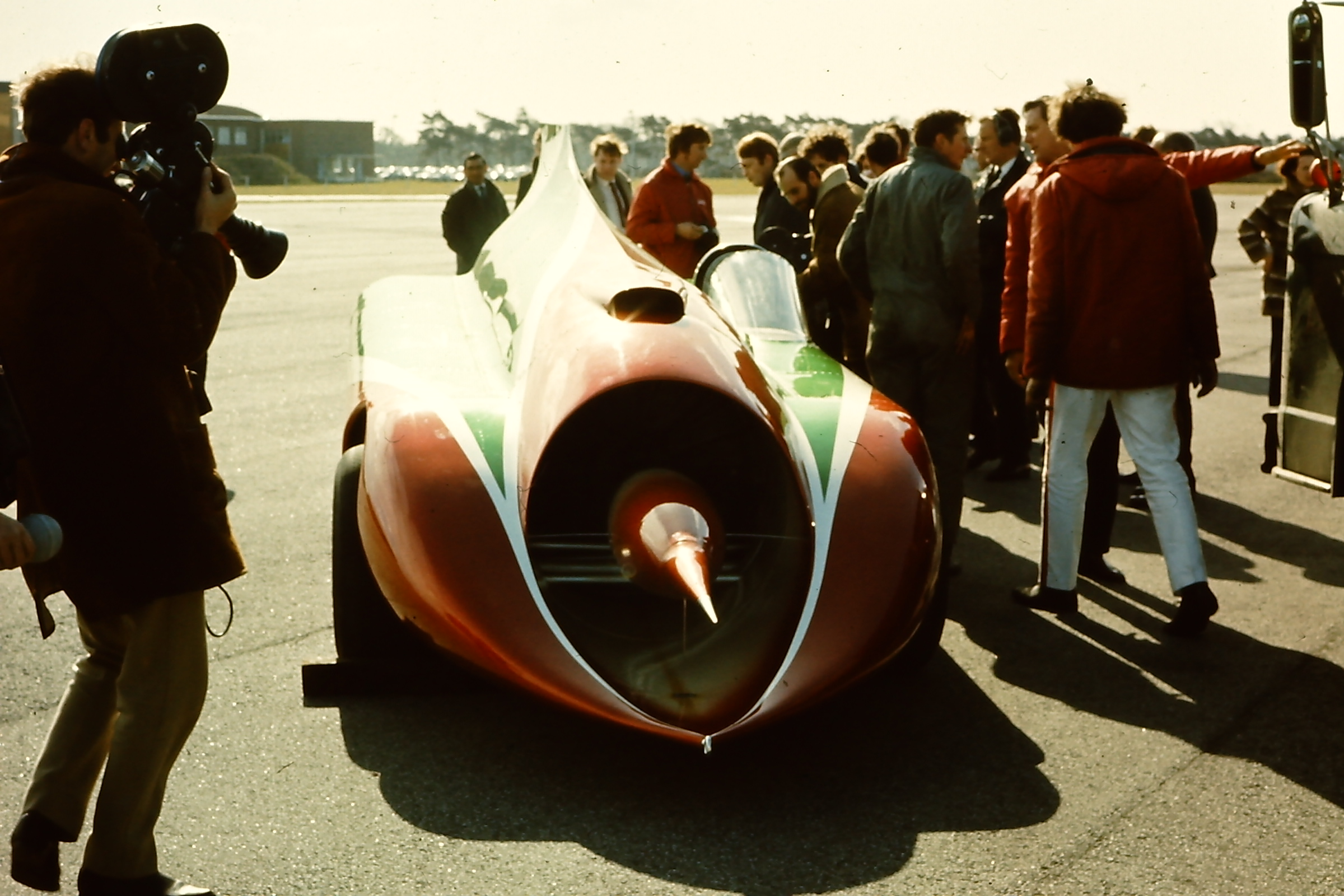
- Green Monster, the Land Speed Record car

Overview
- Type: Jet car for land speed record attempts
- Production: 1964–1965
- Designer: Art Arfons

Body and chassis
- Body style: Custom one-off

Powertrain
- Engine: Turbojet General Electric J79
- Transmission: None

The Green Monster was the name of several vehicles built by Art Arfons and his half-brother Walt Arfons. These ranged from dragsters to a turbojet-powered car that briefly held the land speed record three times during 1964 and 1965.

The land speed record Green Monster set the absolute record three times during the close competition of 1964 and 1965. It was powered by a General Electric J79 taken from an F-104 Starfighter. The jet engine had a four-stage afterburner.

== Early dragsters ==
The first Green Monster appeared in 1952. It was a three-wheeled dragster powered by an Oldsmobile six-cylinder engine and painted with left-over green tractor paint. The name was applied on the car's first outing by the track announcer, Ed Piasczik (Paskey), who laughingly said, "Okay folks, here it comes: The Green Monster", and it stuck to all Arfons' creations. The car only reached 85 mph (137 km/h), 20 mph (32 km/h) short of the fastest car, but by 1953, Green Monster 2, a 20 ft (6.1 m) long six wheeled car powered by an Allison V12 aircraft engine, was hitting 100 mph (160 km/h) in the quarter mile.

Green Monster 2 was painted by Arfons' mother to resemble the World War II Curtiss P-40 Flying Tigers fighter airplane, with an open mouth showing large teeth. The top speed of the car was estimated at 270 mph (430 km/h), and it could reach 140 mph (230 km/h) in nine to ten seconds from a standing start. Running on passenger car tires required four wheels on the rear drive axle to withstand the power. At the first World Series of Drag Racing at Lawrenceville, Illinois, it clocked the highest top speed at 132.35 miles per hour (213.00 km/h), and eventually a world record of 145.16 miles per hour (233.61 km/h).

The later cars had various paint schemes where green was not necessarily the dominant color. The six-wheeled Green Monster 6 became the first dragster to break 150 mph (240 km/h) in the quarter mile. Green Monster 11, Art Arfons' favorite, hit 191 mph (307 km/h) to beat Don Garlits.

Arfons used an Allison V1710 in several Green Monsters.

== Land speed racing ==
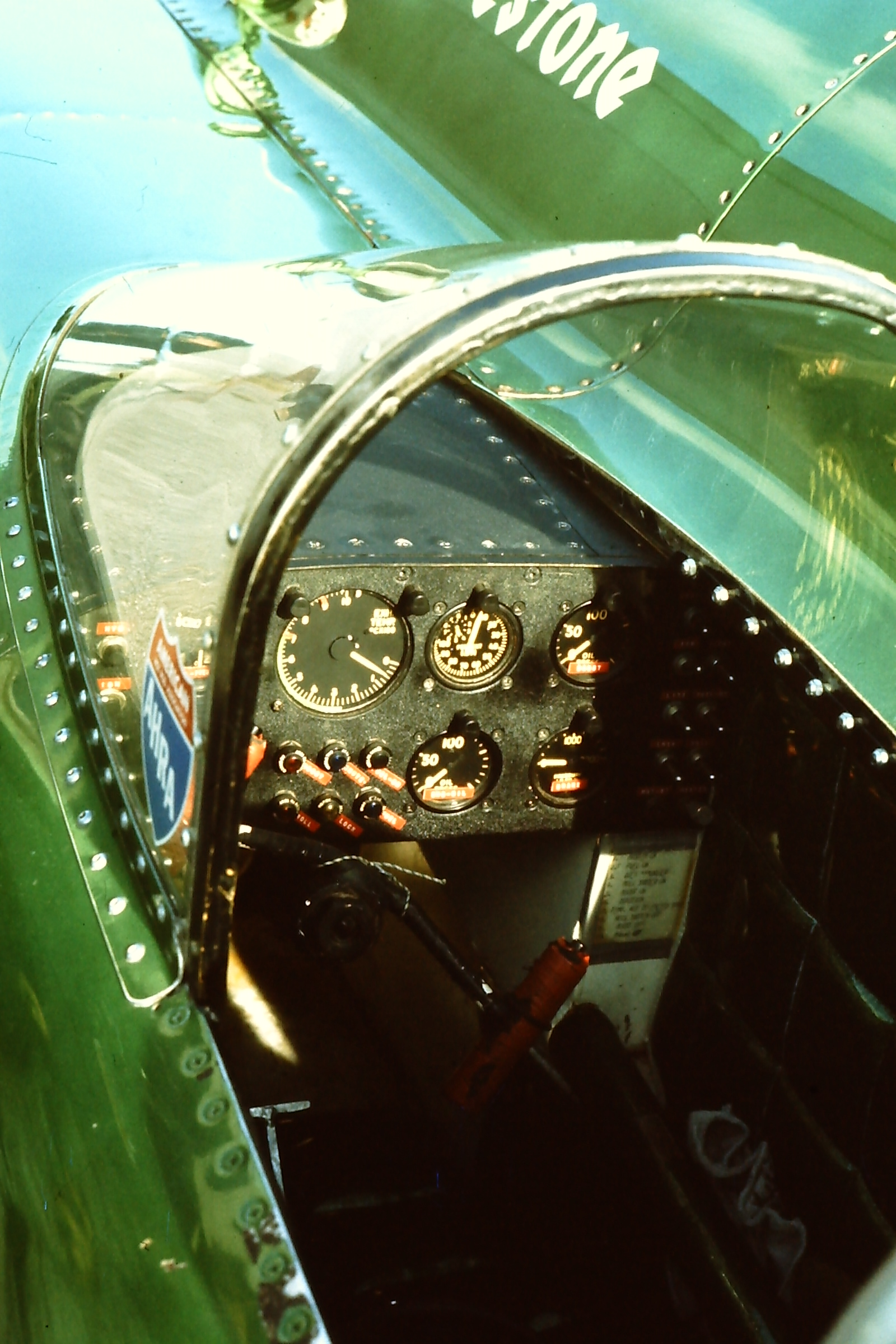
Green Monster jet left-side cockpit and driving position.

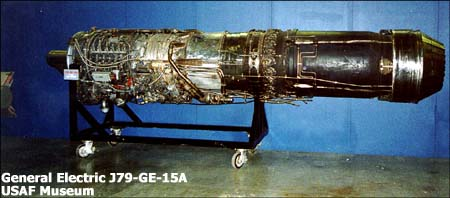
General Electric J79 on display at the National Museum of the United States Air Force

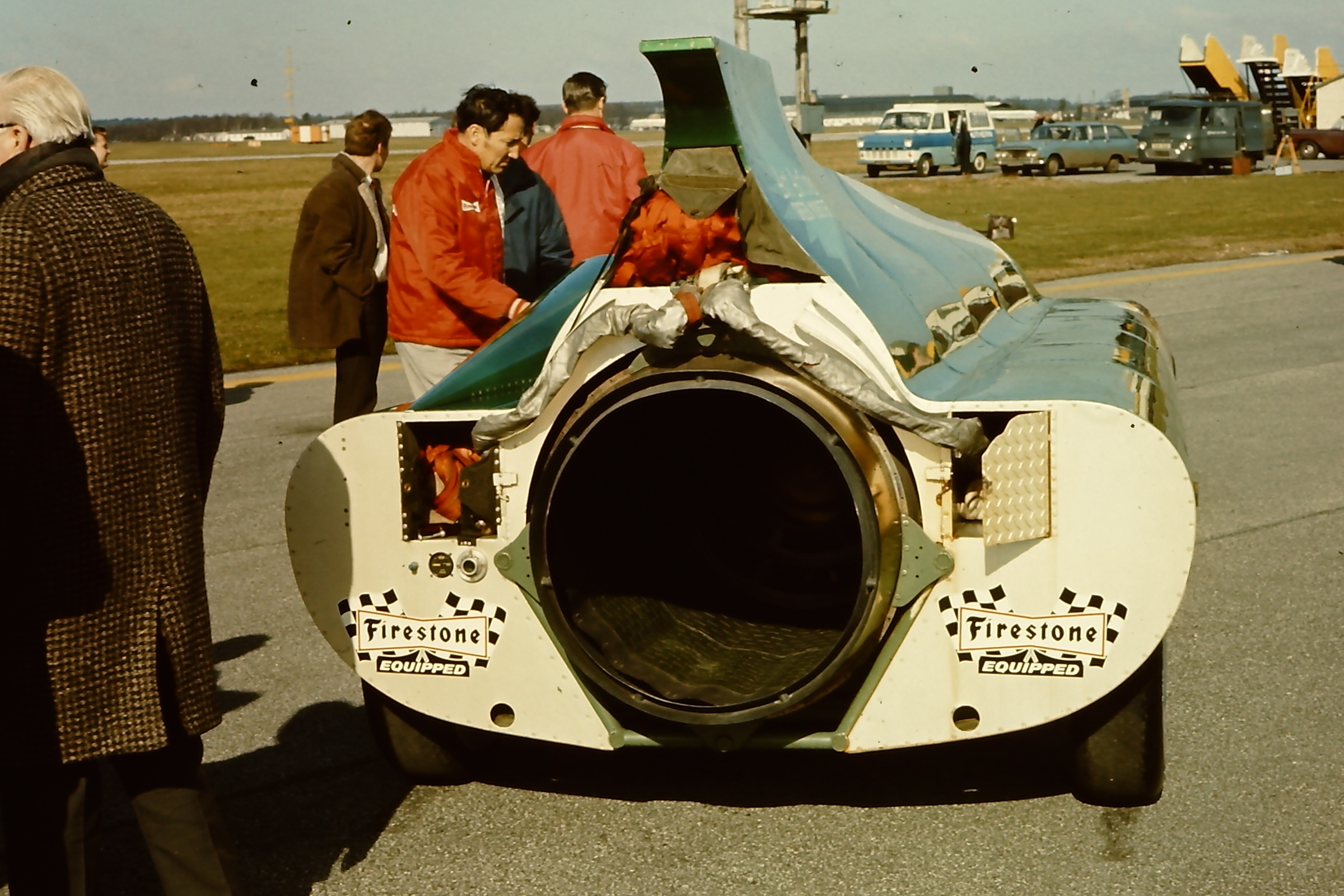
Green Monster rear end.

The Arfons brothers split up, and each became interested in land speed racing.

The most famous Green Monster was powered by a surplus F-104 Starfighter General Electric J79 jet engine, producing 17,500 lbf (78 kN) static thrust with four-stage afterburner, which Arfons purchased from a scrap dealer for $600 and rebuilt himself, over the objections of General Electric and the government, and despite all manuals for the engine being classified top secret.

The engine had been scrapped because of damage caused by ingesting a bolt. Arfons removed 60 blades out of approximately 1000 in the engine, removing broken blades and their counterparts at 180 degrees or the pair at +/-120 degrees to maintain balance. He tested it by tying it to trees in his garden, which drew complaints from his neighbors.

This car, painted in red and blue, set the land speed record three times during the close competition of 1964 and 1965 with averages of 434, 536, and 576 miles per hour (698, 863, and 927 km/h) in the flying mile (despite blowing a tire on the last record run). It competed against Wingfoot Express (built by his brother Walt, who could not pilot the car himself, having suffered a stroke) and Craig Breedlove's Spirit of America – Sonic 1, which eventually set the record at 600.601 miles per hour (966.574 km/h).

In 1966, Arfons returned once again to the Bonneville Salt Flats but reached an average speed of only 554.017 miles per hour (891.604 km/h). On run number seven at 8:03 a.m. on November 17, Arfons crashed his vehicle travelling 610 miles per hour (980 km/h) when a wheel bearing seized. He subsequently built another Green Monster land speed record car but sold it to California rancher Slick Gardner without driving it.

== Later vehicles ==
In view of his wife's concern over the risk involved in land speed record racing, Arfons instead turned his talents to turbine-powered tractor pulling with great success, fielding a series of Green Monster tractor pullers with his son and daughter.

However, in 1989, Arfons returned to Bonneville with Green Monster 27, an 1,800 pounds (820 kg), 22-foot (6.7 m) long two-wheeler. The car left the ground at 350 miles per hour (560 km/h), and Arfons rebuilt it into a less radical four-wheeled vehicle for 1990 but could manage only 177, 308, and 227 miles per hour (285, 496, and 365 km/h). In 1991, he tried again, but once again, he had to give up on handling problems.
