= Dallas International Motor Speedway =

Former racetrack

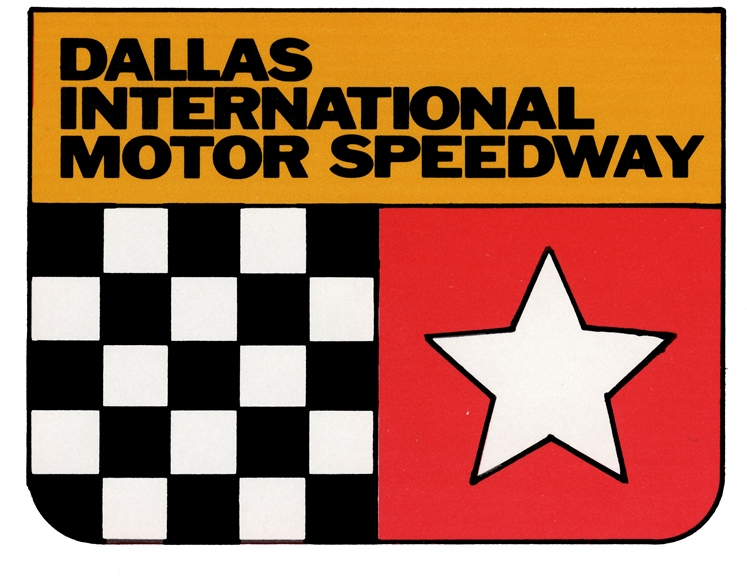

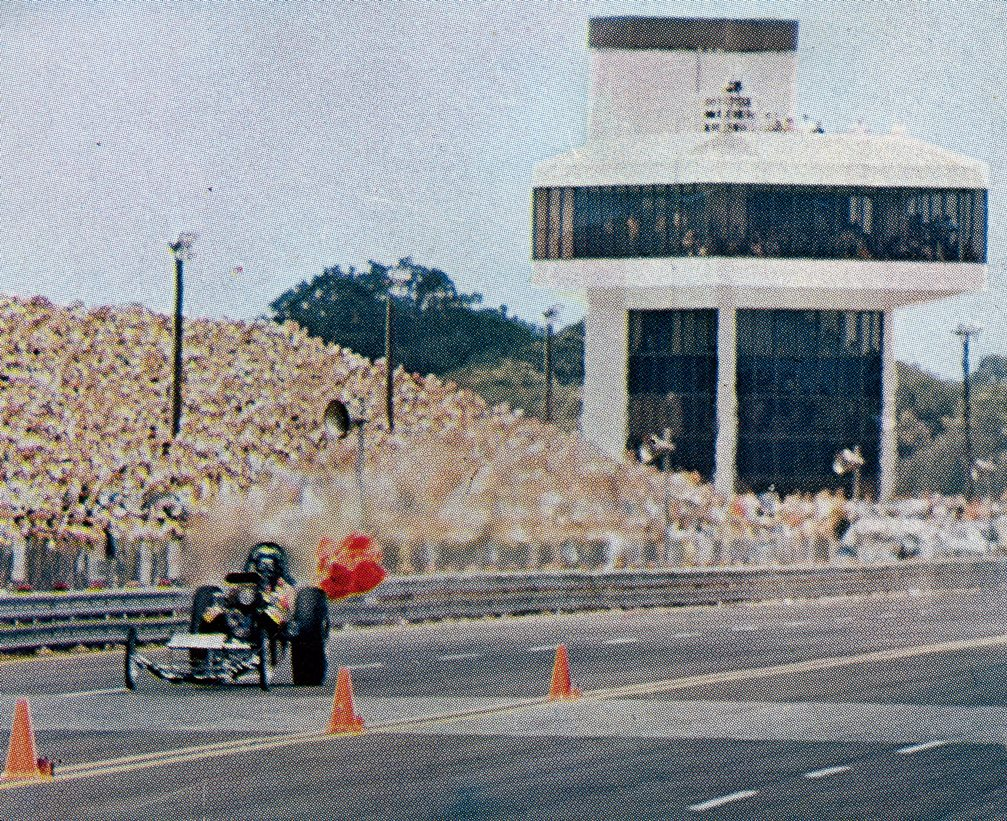
- Location: Lewisville, Texas, United States
- Coordinates: 33.01°N 96.97°W
- Address: intersection of Hebron Parkway & I-35
- Opened: 1969
- Closed: 1973

Drag Strip
- Length: 0.250 mi (0.402 km)

The Dallas International Motor Speedway (DIMS) was a racetrack located in Lewisville, Texas. It operated from June 1969 to 1973. The racetrack served as the site for such events as the NHRA Springnationals, NHRA World Finals, and the Texas International Pop Festival in 1969.

== History ==
When it first opened, the Speedway featured a quarter-mile paved dragstrip, grandstands, and a distinctive control and observation tower. Later, a 2.5-mile road course was added, followed by a quarter-mile dirt course for motorcycle racing.

The first event held at the Speedway was the 1969 NHRA Springnationals. The event was generally considered to be a successful debut for the new track with having the first all six second 32 car Top Fuel dragster field in history. But the event was marred by tragedy when Funny Car driver Gerry Schwartz was killed in a mid-track collision with Pat Foster.

On Labor Day Weekend of 1969, the Texas International Pop Festival was held on the grounds of DIMS with an estimated crowd of 150,000. 30 musical acts that rivaled the more remembered Woodstock festival that took place two weeks prior played in a 25-acre section of the racing facility and included names like Janis Joplin, Santana, Sly & the Family Stone, B.B. King, Chicago Transit Authority and Led Zeppelin among others.

The track was also the site of another racing tragedy on Oct. 16, 1971 when race car driver Art Arfons crashed his jet-powered "Super Cyclops" resulting in the deaths of two track workers and a passenger in the vehicle, WFAA TV news reporter Gene Thomas.

The National Hot Rod Association sanctioned the track when it opened until July 1971. Track management switched sanctioning bodies to the International Hot Rod Association that month and remained until the facility closed in April 1973.

=== Bankruptcy ===
A series of event rainouts, debt issues, and track maintenance costs combined to force the Speedway into bankruptcy by 1973, when the property was purchased for commercial development and the Speedway facilities were demolished. No trace of the Speedway remains at the site today. The track was located east of I-35E at what is now approximately mile marker 448 (Round Grove Rd./Hebron Parkway exit). The Speedway tower was near the present-day intersection of Waters Ridge Dr. and Lake Pointe Dr. The NHRA did not return to the Dallas-Fort Worth metroplex until the Texas Motorplex in Ennis, 60 miles south, opened in 1986.
