= Walt Arfons =

American racing driver

Walter Charles Arfons (December 10, 1916 – June 4, 2013) was the half brother of Art Arfons, his former partner in drag racing, and his competitor in jet-powered land speed record racing. Along with Art, he was a pioneer in the use of aircraft jet engines for these types of competition.

Walt was born Walter Stroud, on December 10, 1916, in Muncie, IN. His mother, Bessie, was of Cherokee descent, and died in 1983 at age 84. Walt had one brother, Dale, two years younger, as well as his ten years younger half-brother Art and an eight and a half years younger half-sister "Lou", both from his mother's marriage to Tom Arfons. Arfons' family operated a feed mill in rural Springfield Township, Ohio, where the Arfons brothers exercised their mechanical skills and ingenuity.

Walt began building dragsters with Art in 1952; their first car was a three-wheeler with an Oldsmobile six-cylinder engine, and an Oliver farm tractor green paint finish. The announcer at the drag strip laughingly announced the car as the Green Monster, and the name was to stick to his joint projects with Art. Along with many other racers, the duo switched to using surplus aircraft piston engines, particularly the Allison V-1710 engines, due to their abundance, cheapness, and great reliability. They were the first drag racers to reach 150 miles per hour in the quarter mile. In the late 1950s, however, the brothers amicably split up.

On August 6, 1960, Walt introduced the first jet-engine dragster. He used a parachute to stop the car since, unlike the piston engines, the jet engine did not provide braking when shut off. Arfons is also credited with being the first to incinerate a junked car with the exhaust from his jet dragster, in order to provide entertainment for the crowd at Indianapolis Raceway Park one year when the race had been rained out.

In the midst of the Detroit automakers' performance competition in 1967, Chrysler Corporation gave Arfons a Dodge Dart, Plymouth Barracuda and Dodge Charger to convert into dragsters. He simply fastened jet engines into the stock cars, with most of the accessories still installed and working. These were such crowd pleasers that he later built fiberglass-bodied jet funny cars, a Chevrolet Camaro, a Mercury Comet, and Ford Mustangs.

Arfons also commissioned Tom Green to drive the jet-powered Wingfoot Express, as a result of a severe hand injury sustained when unloading the Wingfoot upon arrival at the Bonneville Salt Flats in Utah. The car held the World Land Speed Record for three days during the battle between Art Arfons and Craig Breedlove.

In 1965, Walt Arfons built Wingfoot Express 2, which reached 605 miles per hour (974 km/h), but it did not qualify for an official record. It was powered by JATO rocket bottles.

Walt died on June 4, 2013, of heart failure, in Akron, OH; he was 96. He's buried at the East Liberty Cemetery, Green, OH.
