= List of land speed records =

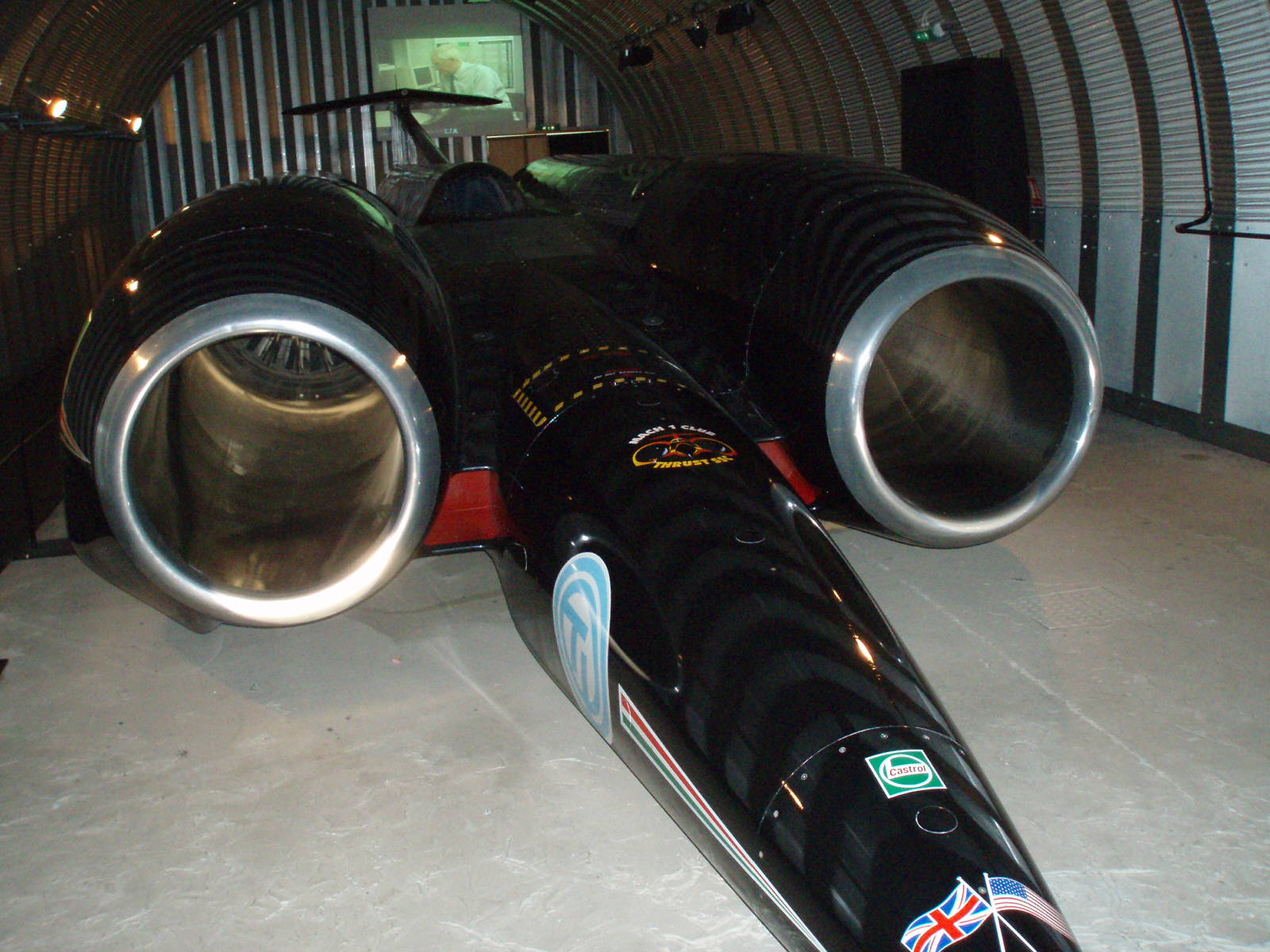
ThrustSSC, driven by Royal Air Force pilot Andy Green, holds the current land speed record at 1,227.986 km/h (763.035 mph) set October 15, 1997.

The land speed record (LSR) or absolute land speed record is the highest speed achieved by a person using a vehicle on land. By a 1964 agreement between the Fédération Internationale de l'Automobile (FIA) and Fédération Internationale de Motocyclisme (FIM), respective governing bodies for racing in automobiles and motorcycles (two or three wheels), both bodies recognise as the absolute LSR whatever is the highest speed record achieved across any of their various categories. While the three-wheeled Spirit of America set an FIM-validated LSR in 1963, all subsequent LSRs are by vehicles in FIA Category C ("Special Vehicles") in either class JE (jet engine) or class RT (rocket powered).

FIA LSRs are officiated and validated by its regional or national affiliate organizations. Speed measurement is standardized over a course measuring either 1 kilometre (0.62 mi) or 1 mile (1.6 km), averaged over two runs with flying start (commonly called "passes") going in opposite directions within one hour. A new record mark must exceed the previous one by at least one percent to be validated.

== History ==
Until 1829 the fastest land transport was by horse. Then, railway speed records were set.

The first automobile record regulator was the Automobile Club de France, which proclaimed itself arbiter of the record in about 1902.

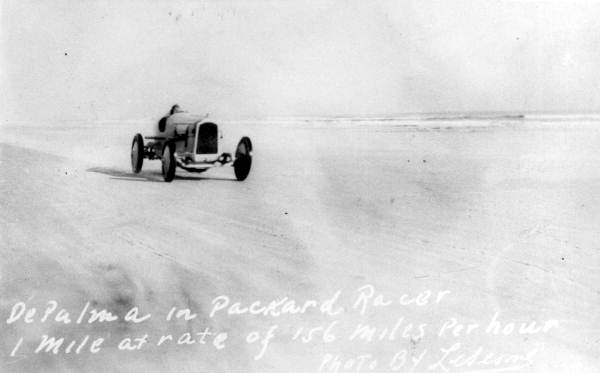
Ralph DePalma in his Packard '905' Special at Daytona Beach in 1919

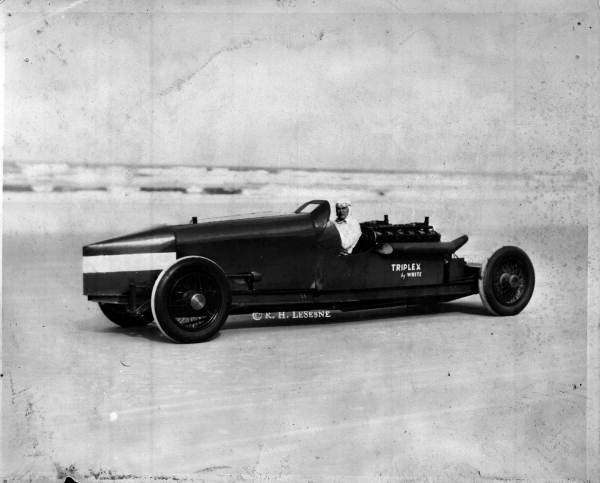
The White Triplex in 1928, driven by Ray Keech

Different clubs had different standards and did not always recognize the same world records until 1924, when the Association Internationale des Automobile Clubs Reconnus (AIACR) introduced new regulations: two passes in opposite directions (to negate the effects of wind) averaged with a maximum of 30 minutes (later more) between runs, average gradient of the racing surface not more than 1 percent, timing gear accurate within 0.01sec, and cars must be wheel-driven. National or regional auto clubs (such as AAA and SCTA) had to be AIACR members to ensure records would be recognized. The AIACR became the FIA in 1947. Controversy arose in 1963: Spirit of America was not recognized due to its being a three-wheeler (leading the Fédération Internationale de Motocyclisme to certify it as a three-wheel motorcycle record when the FIA refused) and not wheel-driven so the FIA introduced a special jet and rocket propelled class. No holder of the absolute record since has been wheel-driven.

In the U.S. and Australia, record runs are often done on salt flats, so the cars are often called salt cars.

== Women's land speed record ==
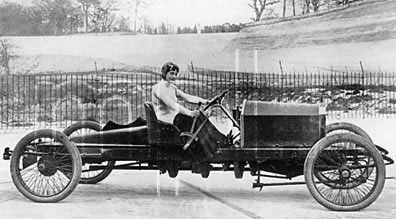
Dorothy Levitt, in a 19 kW (26 hp) Napier, at Brooklands, England, in 1908

The FIA does not recognize separate men's and women's land speed records, because the records are set using motorized vehicles, and not muscle-powered vehicles, so the gender of the driver does not matter; however, unofficial women's records have long been claimed, seemingly starting with Dorothy Levitt's 1906 record in Blackpool, England, and, unlike the FIA and other car-racing organisations, Guinness World Records does recognize gender-based land speed records.

In 1906, Dorothy Levitt broke the women's world speed record for the flying kilometer, recording a speed of 154 km/h (96 mph) and receiving the sobriquet the "Fastest Girl on Earth". She drove a six-cylinder Napier motorcar, a 75 kW (100 hp) development of the K5, in a speed trial in Blackpool.

In 1963, Paula Murphy drove a Studebaker Avanti to 262 km/h (163 mph) at the Bonneville Salt Flats as part of Andy Granatelli's attempt on the overall record. In 1964, she was asked by the tire company Goodyear to try to improve her own record, which she raised to 364.31 km/h (226.37 mph) in Walt Arfons's jet dragster Avenger. The rival tire company Firestone and Art Arfons hit back against Goodyear and Walt Arfons when Betty Skelton drove Art's Cyclops to achieve a two-way average of 446.63 km/h (277.52 mph) in September 1965.

Five weeks later, Goodyear hit back against Firestone with Lee Breedlove. While recordkeeping has not been as extensive, a report in 1974 confirmed that a record was held by Lee Breedlove, the wife of then overall record holder Craig Breedlove, who piloted her husband's Spirit of America – Sonic I to a record 496.492 km/h (308.506 mph) in 1965. According to author Rachel Kushner, Craig Breedlove had talked Lee into taking the car out for a record attempt in order to monopolize the salt flats for the day and block one of his competitors from making a record attempt.

In 1976, the women's absolute record was set by Kitty O'Neil, in the jet-powered, three-wheeled SMI Motivator, at the Alvord Desert. Held back by her contract with a sponsor and using only 60 percent of her car's power, O'Neil reached an average speed of 825.127 km/h (512.710 mph).

On October 9, 2013, driver Jessi Combs, in a vehicle of the North American Eagle Project running at the Alvord Desert, raised the women's four-wheel land speed class record with an official run of 632.40 km/h (392.954 mph), surpassing Breedlove's 48-year-old record. Combs continued with the North American Eagle Project, whose ongoing target is the overall land speed record; as part of that effort, Combs was killed, on August 27, 2019, during an attempt to raise the four-wheel record. In late June 2020, the Guinness Book of Records reclassified the August 27, 2019, speed runs as meeting its requirements, and Combs was posthumously credited with the record at 841.338 km/h (522.783 mph), noting she was the first to break the record in 40 years.

== Records ==
=== 1898–1964: Wheel-driven ===
Date	Location	Driver	Vehicle	Power	Speed				Comments
Date	Location	Driver	Vehicle	Power	Over 1 km		Over 1 mile		Comments
Date	Location	Driver	Vehicle	Power	(mph)	(km/h)	(mph)	(km/h)	Comments
December 18, 1898	Achères, France	(France) Gaston de Chasseloup-Laubat	Jeantaud Duc	Electric	39.24	63.15			Conducted over 1 kilometre (0.62 mi) from a flying start.
January 17, 1899	Achères, France	(Belgium) Camille Jenatzy	GCA Dogcart	Electric	41.42	66.66			
January 17, 1899	Achères, France	(France) Gaston de Chasseloup-Laubat	Jeantaud Duc	Electric	43.93	70.31			
January 27, 1899	Achères, France	(Belgium) Camille Jenatzy	GCA Dogcart	Electric	49.93	80.35			
March 4, 1899	Achères, France	(France) Gaston de Chasseloup-Laubat	Jeantaud Duc Profilée	Electric	57.65	92.78			
April 29, 1899	Achères, France	(Belgium) Camille Jenatzy	CITA No 25 La Jamais Contente	Electric	65.79	105.88			First purpose-designed land speed racer First record over 100 km/h (62 mph)
April 13, 1902	Nice, France	(France) Léon Serpollet	Gardner-Serpollet; Œuf de Pâques (Easter Egg)	Steam	75.06	120.80			
August 5, 1902	Ablis, France	(United States) William Kissam Vanderbilt II	Mors Z Paris-Vienne	Internal combustion	76.03	122.438			First internal combustion powered record
November 5, 1902	Dourdan, France	(France) Henri Fournier	Mors Z Paris-Vienne	Internal combustion V4, 9.2-litre, 60 bhp	76.59	123.25			
November 17, 1902	Dourdan, France	(France) Maurice Augières	Mors Z Paris-Vienne	Internal combustion	77.13	124.13			
July 17, 1903	Ostend, Belgium	(Belgium) Arthur Duray	Gobron Brillié Paris-Madrid	Internal combustion	83.46	132.32			
November 5, 1903	Dourdan, France	(Belgium) Arthur Duray	Gobron Brillié Paris-Madrid	Internal combustion	84.73	136.35			
January 12, 1904	New Baltimore, United States	(United States) Henry Ford	Ford 999 Racer	Internal combustion			91.37	147.05	
March 31, 1904	Nice, France	(France) Louis Rigolly	Gobron-Brillié Paris-Madrid	Internal combustion	94.78	152.53			
May 25, 1904	Ostend, Belgium	(Belgium) Pierre de Caters	Mercedes Simplex 90	Internal combustion	97.25	156.50			
July 21, 1904	Ostend, Belgium	(France) Louis Rigolly	Gobron-Brillié Gordon Bennett	Internal combustion	103.56	166.66			First record over 100 mph (161 km/h), 2 months after City of Truro's.
November 13, 1904	Ostend, Belgium	(France) Paul Baras	Darracq Gordon Bennett	Internal combustion	104.53	168.22			
December 30, 1905	Arles, France	(France) Victor Hémery	Darracq Special	Internal combustion	109.59	176.37			
January 26, 1906	Daytona Beach, United States	(United States) Fred Marriott	Stanley Rocket	Steam	127.66	205.44			First record over 200 km/h (124 mph). First faster than contemporary rail speed record. Fastest steam-powered land vehicle until 2009.
November 8, 1909	Brooklands, United Kingdom	(France) Victor Hémery	Benz No. 1; 200 hp (150 kW)	Internal combustion: 21.5 L (1,310 cu in) inline-4 Benz engine	125.94	202.68	115.93	186.57	First run using electronic timing
June 24, 1914	Brooklands, United Kingdom	(United Kingdom) Lydston Hornsted	Benz No. 3; 200 hp (150 kW)	Internal combustion: 21.5 L (1,310 cu in) inline-4 Benz engine	—		124.09	199.70	First 2-way record, set at Brooklands under new Association Internationale des Automobile Clubs Reconnus (AIACR) 2-way rule
May 17, 1922	Brooklands, United Kingdom	(United Kingdom) Kenelm Lee Guinness	Sunbeam 350HP	V12, single ohc, 18.3 litre, 350 b.h.p. engine	133.75	215.25			The third and last time the record was set at Brooklands
July 6, 1924	Arpajon, France	(France) René Thomas	Délage	Internal combustion, V12, ohv, 10.6 litre, 280 bhp engine			143.31	230.634	
July 12, 1924	Arpajon, France	(United Kingdom) Ernest Eldridge	FIAT Mephistopheles	Internal combustion: 21.7 L (1,320 cu in) inline-6 FIAT A.12 aero engine	—		145.89	234.98	Fastest land speed record ever on a public road
September 25, 1924	Pendine, United Kingdom	(United Kingdom) Malcolm Campbell	Sunbeam 350HP	Internal combustion: 18.3 L (1,120 cu in) V12 Sunbeam aero engine	—		146.16	235.22	First land speed record by Malcolm Campbell
July 21, 1925	Pendine, United Kingdom	(United Kingdom) Malcolm Campbell	Sunbeam 350HP	Internal combustion: 18.3 L (1,120 cu in) V12 Sunbeam aero engine	—		150.87	242.8	First person to travel on land at over 150 mph (241 km/h)
March 16, 1926	Ainsdale beach at Southport, United Kingdom	(United Kingdom) Henry Segrave	Ladybird	Internal combustion: a 4-litre Sunbeam Tiger			152.33	245.15	
April 27, 1926	Pendine, United Kingdom	(United Kingdom) J. G. Parry-Thomas	Babs	Internal combustion: 27 L (1,600 cu in) V12 Liberty L-12 aero engine	169.29	270.864	168.74	269.984	
April 28, 1926	Pendine, United Kingdom	(United Kingdom) J. G. Parry-Thomas	Babs	Internal combustion: 27 L (1,600 cu in) V12 Liberty L-12 aero engine	172.09	275.341	171.69	274.590	
February 4, 1927	Pendine, United Kingdom	(United Kingdom) Malcolm Campbell	Napier-Campbell Blue Bird	Internal combustion: 22.3 L (1,360 cu in) W12 Napier Lion aero engine	—		174.88	281.44	
March 29, 1927	Daytona Beach, United States	(United Kingdom) Henry Segrave	Mystery (aka "Sunbeam 1000 hp")	Internal combustion: 2 × 22.4 L (1,370 cu in) V12 Sunbeam Matabele aero engines	203.79	327.97			The first car to reach a speed over 200 mph (320 km/h)
February 19, 1928	Daytona Beach, United States	(United Kingdom) Malcolm Campbell	Napier-Campbell Blue Bird	Internal combustion: 23.9 L (1,460 cu in) W12 Napier Lion aero engine	206.956	333.048			
April 22, 1928	Daytona Beach, United States	(United States) Ray Keech	Triplex Special	Internal combustion: 3 × 27 L (1,600 cu in) V12 Liberty L-12 aero engines	207.552	334.007			
March 11, 1929	Daytona Beach, United States	(United Kingdom) Henry Segrave	Golden Arrow	Internal combustion: 23.9 L (1,460 cu in) W12 Napier Lion aero engine	231.446	372.459			Segrave was knighted for this effort
February 5, 1931	Daytona Beach, United States	(United Kingdom) Malcolm Campbell	Campbell-Napier-Railton Blue Bird	Internal combustion: 23.9 L (1,460 cu in) W12 Napier Lion supercharged aero engine	246.09	396.025			Campbell was knighted for this effort
February 24, 1932	Daytona Beach, United States	(United Kingdom) Malcolm Campbell	Campbell-Napier-Railton Blue Bird	Internal combustion: 23.9 L (1,460 cu in) W12 Napier Lion supercharged aero engine	253.97	408.73			First 250 mph (400 km/h) pass.
February 22, 1933	Daytona Beach, United States	(United Kingdom) Malcolm Campbell	Campbell-Railton Blue Bird	Internal combustion: 36.7 L (2,240 cu in) V12 Rolls-Royce R supercharged aero engine	272.46	438.48			
March 7, 1935	Daytona Beach, United States	(United Kingdom) Malcolm Campbell	Campbell-Railton Blue Bird	Internal combustion: 36.7 L (2,240 cu in) V12 Rolls-Royce R supercharged aero engine	276.816	445.472			
September 3, 1935	Bonneville Salt Flats, United States	(United Kingdom) Malcolm Campbell	Campbell-Railton Blue Bird	Internal combustion: 36.7 L (2,240 cu in) V12 Rolls-Royce R supercharged aero engine	301.129	484.598			First 300 mph (480 km/h) pass, first absolute record set at Bonneville
November 19, 1937	Bonneville Salt Flats, United States	(United Kingdom) George Eyston	Thunderbolt	Internal combustion: 2 × 36.7 L (2,240 cu in) V12 Rolls-Royce R supercharged aero engines	311.42	501.16			
August 27, 1938	Bonneville Salt Flats, United States	(United Kingdom) George Eyston	Thunderbolt	Internal combustion: 2 × 36.7 L (2,240 cu in) V12 Rolls-Royce R supercharged aero engines	345.49	556.012			
September 15, 1938	Bonneville Salt Flats, United States	(United Kingdom) John Cobb	Railton	Internal combustion: 2 × 23.9 L (1,460 cu in) W12 Napier Lion supercharged aero engines	350.2	563.566			
September 16, 1938	Bonneville Salt Flats, United States	(United Kingdom) George Eyston	Thunderbolt	Internal combustion: 2 × 36.7 L (2,240 cu in) V12 Rolls-Royce R supercharged aero engines	357.5	575.314			
August 23, 1939	Bonneville Salt Flats, United States	(United Kingdom) John Cobb	Railton Special	Internal combustion: 2 × 23.9 L (1,460 cu in) W12 Napier Lion supercharged aero engines	369.74	595.04	367.91	592.091	
September 16, 1947	Bonneville Salt Flats, United States	(United Kingdom) John Cobb	Railton Mobil Special	Internal combustion: 2 × 23.9 L (1,460 cu in) W12 Napier Lion supercharged aero engines	394.196	634.397	394.19	634.39	First single pass at over 400 mph (402 mph)
July 17, 1964	Lake Eyre, Australia	(United Kingdom) Donald Campbell	Bluebird CN7	Turboshaft: 1 × 4,000 hp (3,000 kW) Bristol Proteus gas turbine			403.10	648.73	Last wheel driven absolute record.

=== 1963–present: Jet and rocket propulsion ===
Craig Breedlove's mark of 407.447 miles per hour (655.722 km/h), set in Spirit of America in September 1963, was initially considered unofficial. The vehicle breached the FIA regulations on two grounds: it had only three wheels, and it was not wheel-driven, since its jet engine did not supply power to its axles. Some time later, the Fédération Internationale de Motocyclisme (FIM) created a non-wheel-driven category, and ratified Spirit of America's time for this mark. On July 17, 1964, Donald Campbell's Bluebird CN7 posted a speed of 403.10 miles per hour (648.73 km/h) on Lake Eyre, Australia. This became the official FIA LSR, although Campbell was disappointed not to have beaten Breedlove's time. In October, several four-wheel jet-cars surpassed the 1963 mark, but were eligible for neither FIA nor FIM ratification. The confusion of having three different LSRs lasted until December 11, 1964, when the FIA and FIM met in Paris and agreed to recognize as an absolute LSR the higher speed recorded by either body, by any vehicles running on wheels, whether wheel-driven or not.

Date	Location	Driver	Vehicle	Power	Speed				Comments
Date	Location	Driver	Vehicle	Power	Over 1 km		Over 1 mile		Comments
Date	Location	Driver	Vehicle	Power	(mph)	(km/h)	(mph)	(km/h)	Comments
August 5, 1963	Bonneville Salt Flats, United States	(United States) Craig Breedlove	Spirit of America	Turbojet			407.447	655.722	Initially considered unofficial since the vehicle had 3 wheels. Later ratified by FIM.
October 2, 1964	Bonneville Salt Flats, United States	(United States) Tom Green	Wingfoot Express	Turbojet			413.2	665.0	
October 5, 1964	Bonneville Salt Flats, United States	(United States) Art Arfons	Green Monster	Turbojet			434.03	698.50	
October 13, 1964	Bonneville Salt Flats, United States	(United States) Craig Breedlove	Spirit of America	Turbojet			468.719	754.330	
October 15, 1964	Bonneville Salt Flats, United States	(United States) Craig Breedlove	Spirit of America	Turbojet			526.277	846.961	
October 27, 1964	Bonneville Salt Flats, United States	(United States) Art Arfons	Green Monster	Turbojet			536.710	863.751	
November 2, 1965	Bonneville Salt Flats, United States	(United States) Craig Breedlove	Spirit of America – Sonic 1	Turbojet	555.485	893.966	555.485	893.966	
November 7, 1965	Bonneville Salt Flats, United States	(United States) Art Arfons	Green Monster	Turbojet	576.553	927.872	576.553	927.872	
November 15, 1965	Bonneville Salt Flats, United States	(United States) Craig Breedlove	Spirit of America – Sonic 1	Turbojet	594	955.950	600.601	966.574	First thrust powered record to be ratified by the FIA
October 23, 1970	Bonneville Salt Flats, United States	(United States) Gary Gabelich	Blue Flame	Rocket	630.478	1014.656	622.407	1001.667	
October 4, 1983	Black Rock Desert, United States	(United Kingdom) Richard Noble	Thrust2	Turbojet: 1 × Rolls-Royce Avon	634.051	1020.406	633.47	1019.47	
September 25, 1997	Black Rock Desert, United States	(United Kingdom) Andy Green	ThrustSSC	Turbofan: 2 × Rolls-Royce Spey	713.990	1149.055	714.144	1149.303	
October 15, 1997	Black Rock Desert, United States	(United Kingdom) Andy Green	ThrustSSC	Turbofan: 2 × Rolls-Royce Spey	760.343	1223.657	763.035	1227.986	First to break the speed of sound

== See also ==
- List of vehicle speed records
- List of British land speed records
- List of production car speed records
- List of speed records in rail transport
- List of motorcycle land-speed records
- Aero-engined car
- Pioneer 2M – Soviet Union attempt at the land speed record in early 1960s
- Budweiser Rocket – Claimed but not verified to have reached 739.666 miles per hour (1,190.377 km/h) and to have broken the sound barrier in 1979
- North American Eagle Project – Aiming for 808 mph (1,300 km/h), the project was abandoned after one of its drivers was killed in the car.
- Bloodhound LSR – Project aiming for 1,050 mph (1,690 km/h).
- Rosco McGlashan – Australia's fastest man on the land. His Aussie Invader team is building a fully rocket-powered LSR car with an attempt at the record currently on hold pending funding.
- Goldenrod - The car which held the wheel-driven land speed record from 1965 to 1991.
