= Pioneer 2M =

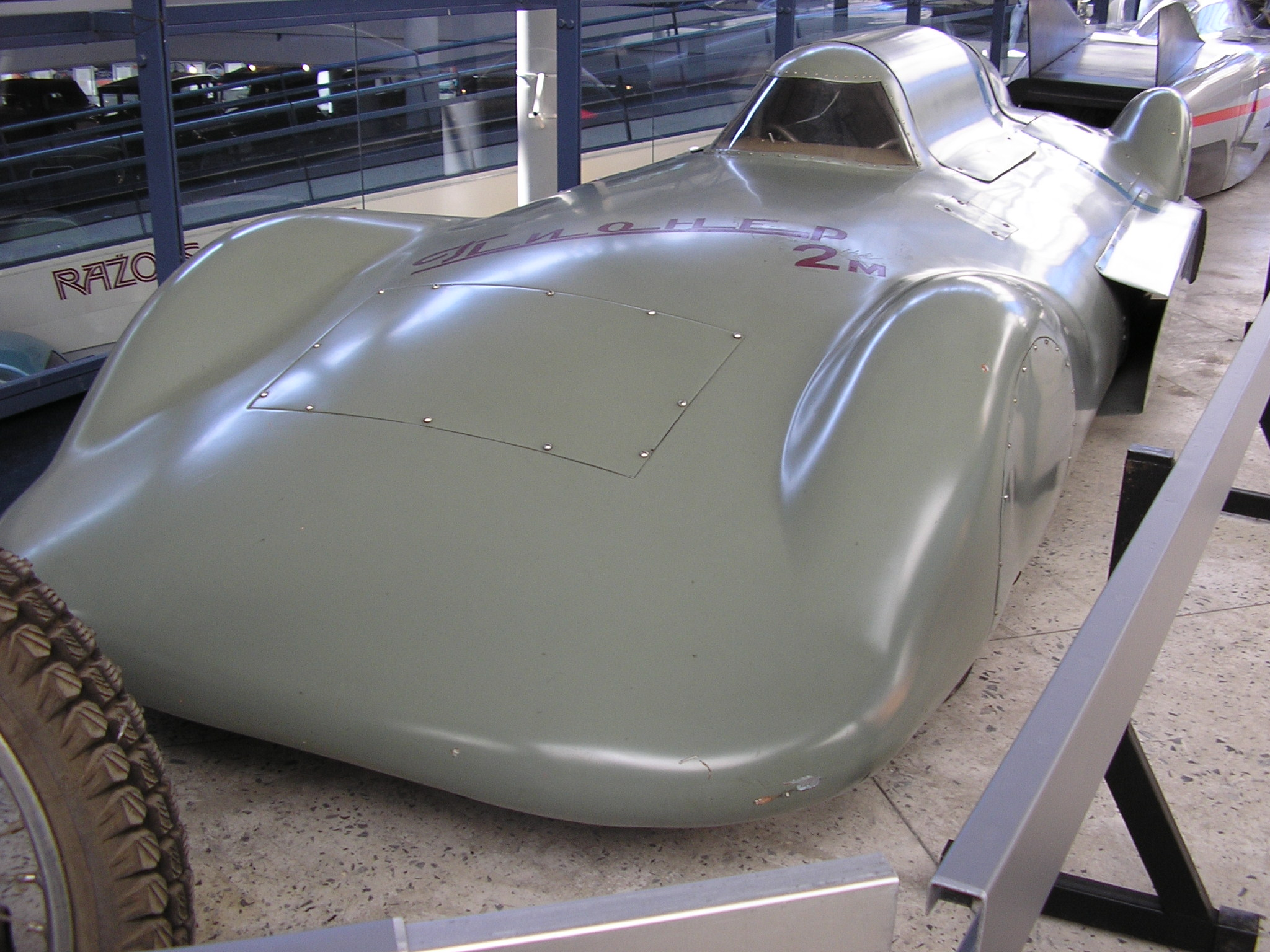
Pioneer 2M on display at Riga Motor Museum.

The Pioneer 2M was a Soviet Group VII land speed record car built in 1961 under the guidance of sportsman and engineer Ilya Aleksandrovich Tikhomirov. Based on the 1960 record car Pioneer 1, the body was made of aluminum and the wheels of a magnesium alloy. It was powered by two gas turbine engines (80 hp each at 50000 rpm) placed on either side near the driver's seat. On 1 September 1963, Tikhomirov achieved a speed of 311.419 km/h (193.506 mph) for the measured kilometer at the Baskunchak dry salt lake, setting a Group VIII record and making it the fastest car in the Soviet Union at the time.

Pioneer 2M continued to set records in the Soviet Union until 1972.
