= Jet car =

Car propelled by a jet engine

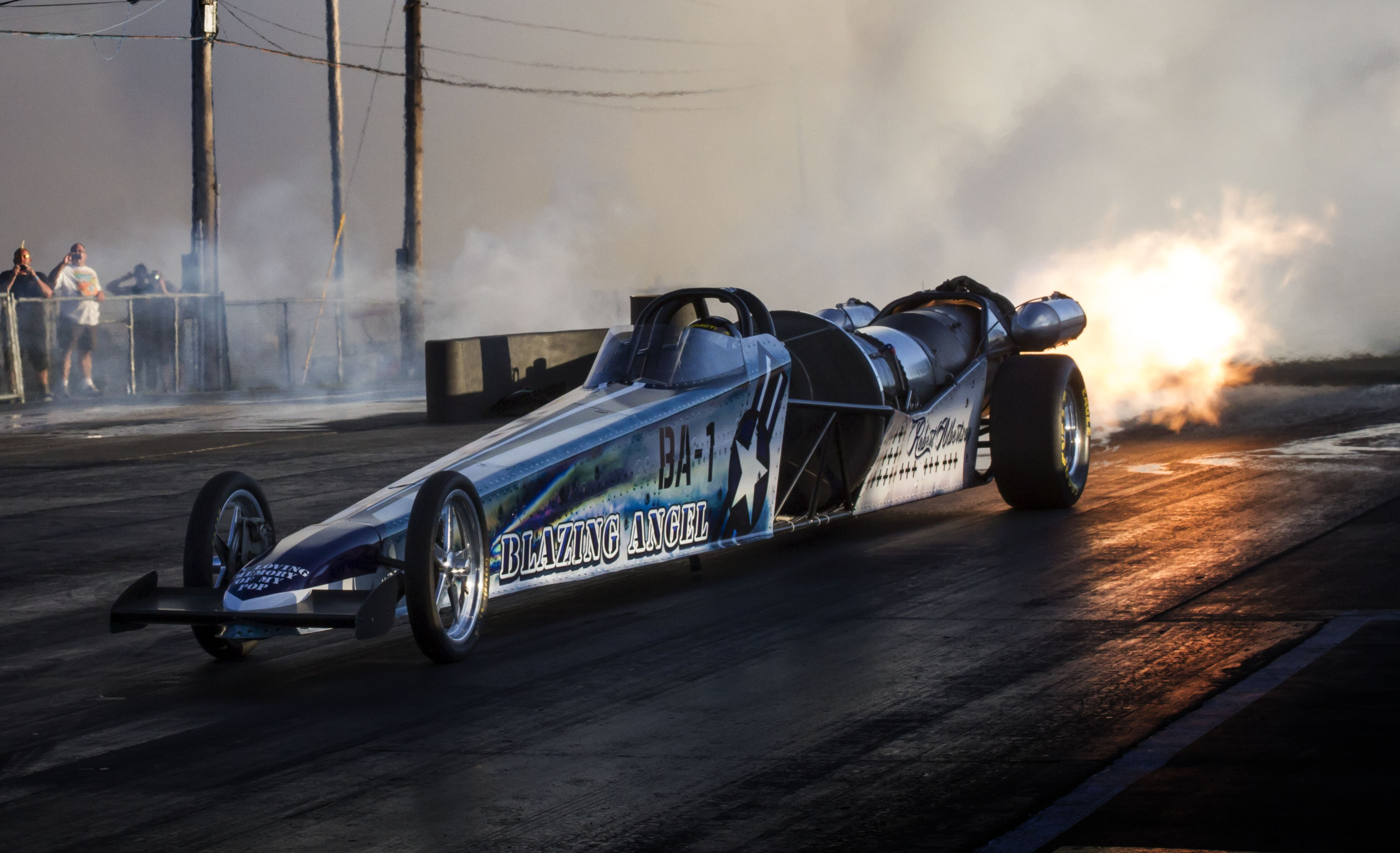
Blazing Angel jet dragster

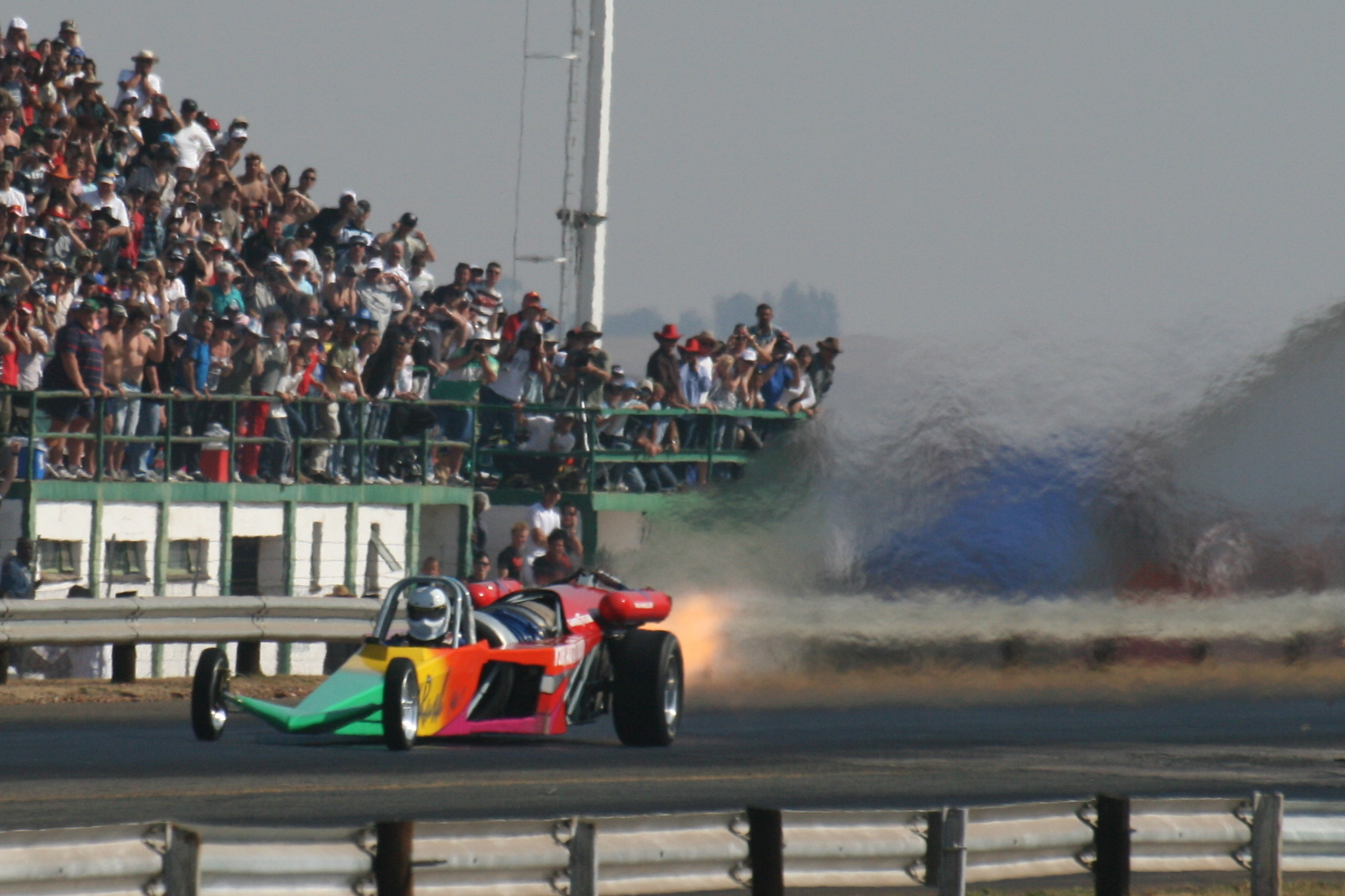
A jet dragster in action

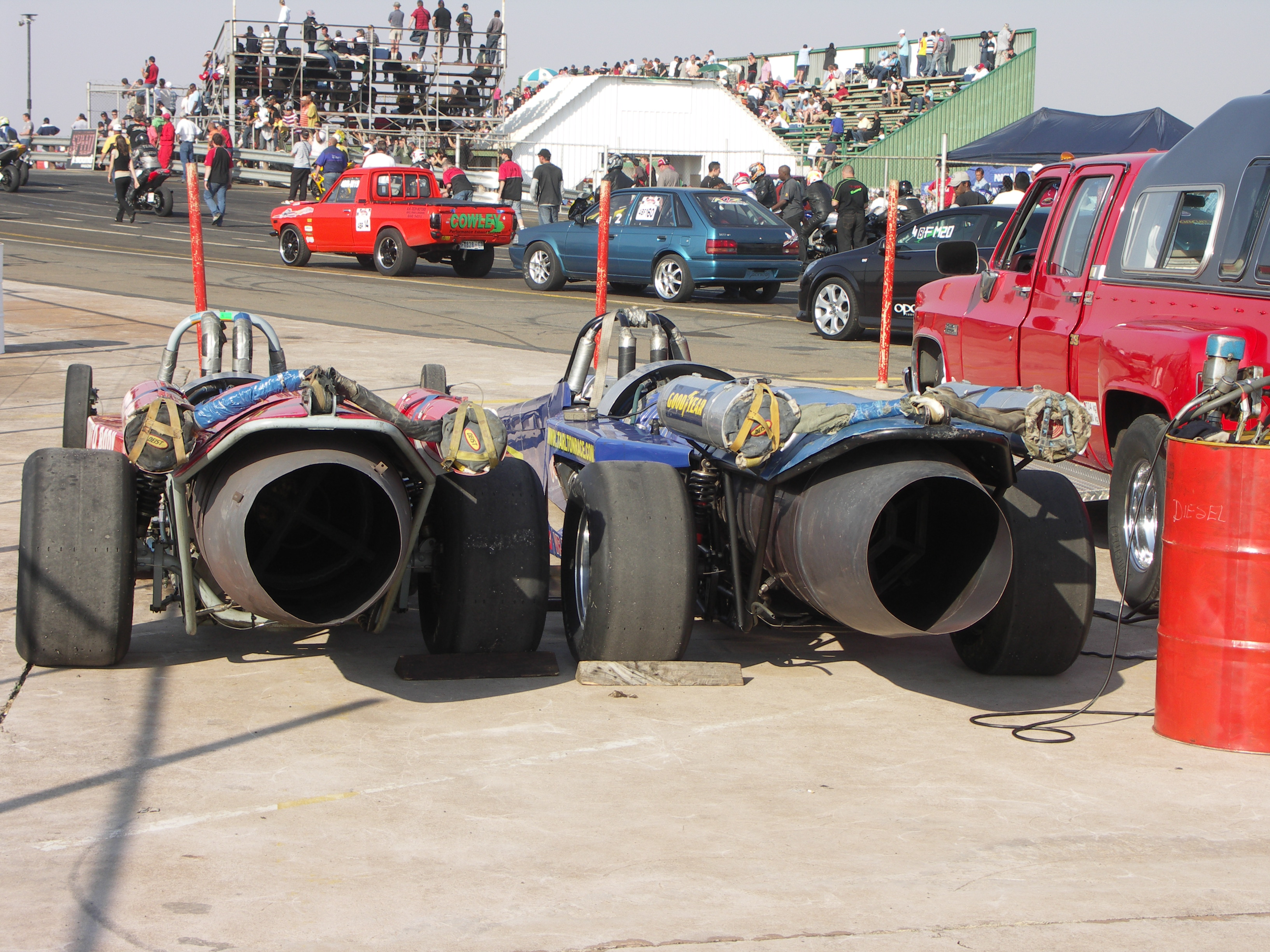
Two jet dragsters

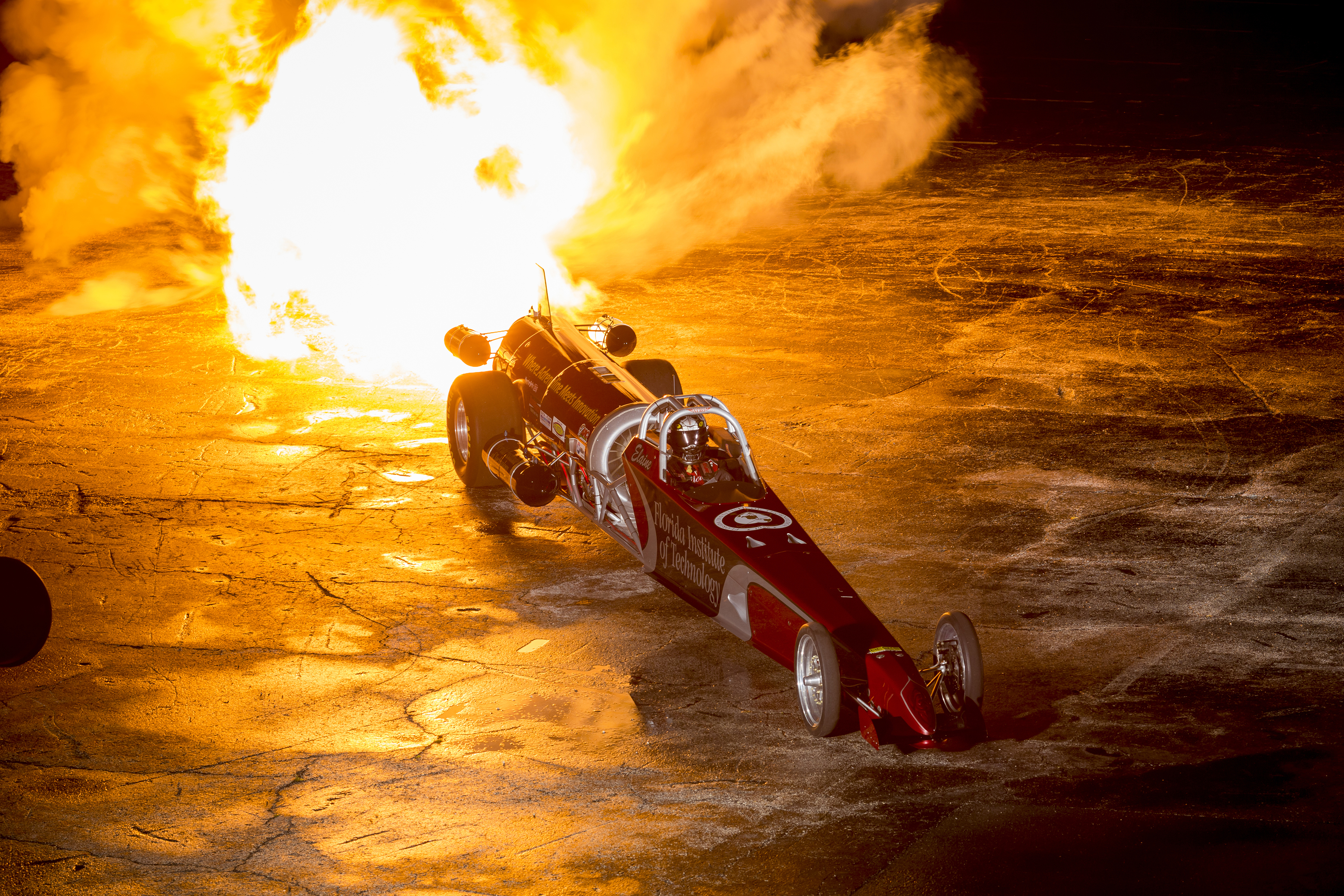
Larsen Motorsport's Florida Tech Jet Dragster

A jet car is a car propelled by a jet engine. A jet dragster is a jet powered car used for drag racing. They are most commonly seen at race shows.

== Land speed record ==
Jet powered cars are commonly used for land speed record attempts, after an FIA rule change that permitted them in 1964.

== Drag racers ==
Some cars such as Green Monster and Vampire raced as dragsters (as well as also achieving or attempting land speed records).

In 2006, while filming an episode for the series Top Gear, presenter and driver Richard Hammond was critically injured in a crash with the jet dragster, Vampire, that he was piloting.

More modern jet dragsters such as Robert Albertson's "Blazing Angel" are capable of reaching over 300 miles per hour (480 km/h) in a quarter of a mile.

Most of these modern cars are powered by the Pratt & Whitney J60 or the General Electric J85 jet engine.

== See also ==
- Aero-engined car
- Drag racing
- Electric dragster
- Jet engine
- JetTrain
- Jet Truck
- Turbojet train
- Rocket car
