= Art Arfons =

American racing driver

- Born: Arthur Eugene Arfons; February 3, 1926; Akron, Ohio, U.S.
- Died: December 3, 2007 (aged 81); Springfield Township, Ohio, U.S.
- Occupation: Drag racer
- Years active: 1952–1971
- Known for: Three times holder of the world land speed record (1964–1965)
- Relatives: Walt Arfons (brother)

Arthur Eugene Arfons (February 3, 1926 – December 3, 2007) was the world land speed record holder three times from 1964 to 1965 with his Green Monster series of jet-powered cars, after a series of Green Monster piston-engine and jet-engined dragsters. He subsequently went on to field a succession of Green Monster turbine-engined pulling tractors, before returning to land speed record racing. He was announced as a 2008 inductee in the International Motorsports Hall of Fame three days after his death.

== Family ==
Art Arfons' father, Tom, was born in Greece and came to the United States at age 14. He settled in Akron, Ohio, where Art was born. Tom died in 1950, at age 52. His mother, Bessie, who was of Cherokee descent, died in 1983 at age 84. Arfons had two half brothers by his mother — Walt Arfons, ten years older, who was to become his partner and later competitor in motor sports, and Dale, eight years older, as well as one sister "Lou", eighteen months older.

== Early life ==
Arfons' family operated a feed mill in rural Ohio, where the Arfons brothers exercised their mechanical skills and ingenuity. After his junior year of high school, at just under 17 years of age, Art joined the United States Navy. He was sent to diesel mechanic school, then assigned as a mechanic to a landing craft in the Pacific Theater. This was a very good job for Arfons to utilize his mechanical talents. He participated in two battles including the invasion of Okinawa, and then was discharged after three years, as a Petty Officer Second Class. He returned to Ohio, was married, and had two sons and a daughter. In 1952, he and his half-brother Walt became fascinated with drag racing and built their first Green Monster. In this endeavor, they were supported by their mother, who was also fascinated by the sport. Art and Walt continued their drag racing partnership with a series of Green Monster cars until the late 1950s, parting amicably but competing against each other.

== Land speed record ==
Arfons' path led almost inevitably to land speed record racing at Bonneville, first in 1960 with the "Anteater", a car modeled after John Cobb's "Railton Special" and powered by an Allison V-1710 aircraft engine. In 1961 he reached a top speed of 313.78 mph (504.98 km/h) before burning out the clutch. Arfons sold the car to Bob Motz.

In 1962, Arfons began experimenting with jet-powered cars, where his innate mechanical skills proved tremendously useful. Art's first car, the 8,000 hp (6 MW) Cyclops, remains the fastest open cockpit vehicle, recording 330.113 miles per hour (531.265 km/h) in the measured mile in 1962. Unfortunately, his design had the driver sitting directly in the air intake to the engine, so that there was no way to enclose the cockpit and still supply air to the engine; this limited top speed severely. In deference to the car's less-than-excellent aerodynamics, Arfons introduced another innovation: It was the first land speed record car to utilize a wing to produce downforce to prevent the car from becoming airborne.

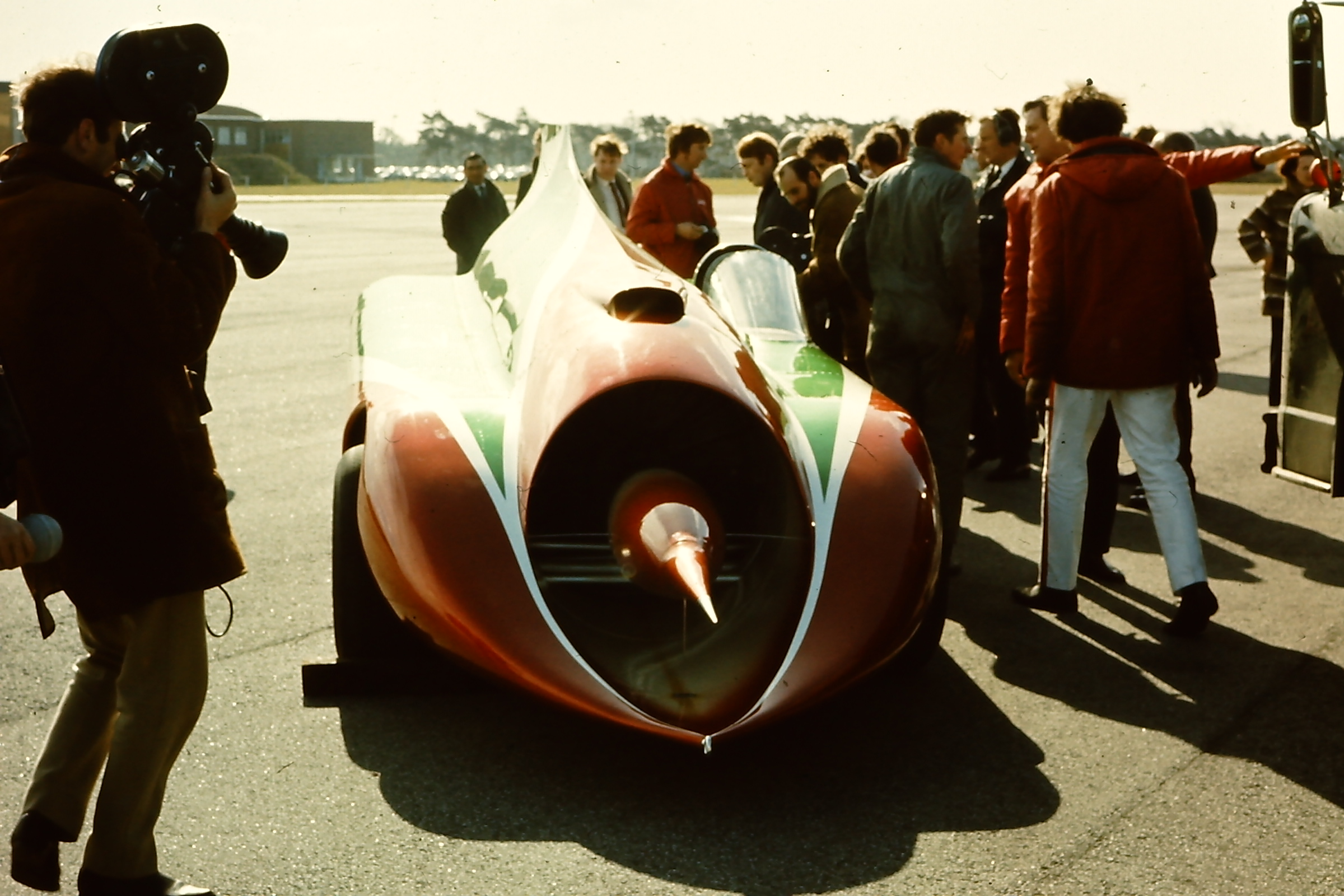
The Green Monster Land Speed Record car

Arfons returned to Bonneville in 1964 with another Green Monster. He held the world land speed record three times during the closely fought competition of 1964 and 1965, but after a bad crash in 1966 at 610 MPH, the fastest crash ever survived, turned his attention to jet turbine powered tractor pulling competition where he was, as usual, successful. In 1979 he won his only NTPA championship in the 9200 Modified class. In 1989, however, he attempted to return to land speed record competition, but was never competitive.

Art's son, Tim Arfons, has continued the tradition by competing in jet-powered dragsters as well as in turbine-powered pulling "funny cars", and has been a stunt and exhibition driver in a series of jet-powered ATVs and even a jet-powered personal watercraft. His daughter Allison "Dusty" Arfons, named after the aircraft engine in the Anteater, also competed in tractor pulling with her father. His oldest son Ronald Arthur Arfons, died on October 23, 2006, at age 58.

== Tragedy ==
On October 16, 1971, while making an exhibition run at the Dallas International Motor Speedway in Lewisville, Texas, Arfons lost control of his radical jet-powered vehicle, resulting in the death of three people. IHRA staff members Robert John Kelsey (age 20) and Sean Pence (age 17) were struck and killed, along with WFAA (Dallas, Texas) news reporter, Gene Thomas (age 31), who was a passenger in the vehicle. Arfons' "Super Cyclops" was making its first run of the day in an attempt to pass the 300 mph (480 km/h) mark. Near the end of the run, a tire burst as the parachutes deployed; it veered into a guard rail and crashed beyond the finish line. Thomas, a popular Dallas television reporter, was apparently thrown out of the vehicle when it rolled over. The vehicle was configured with the driver and passenger sitting on each side of a huge engine. Arfons sustained minor injuries. He was taken to Parkland Memorial Hospital in Dallas and released shortly afterward. The Dallas event was to be his last race.

== Award ==
Arfons was inducted into the Motorsports Hall of Fame of America and the International Drag Racing Hall of Fame (prior to 2005) "Hall of Fame Inductees", International Motorsports Hall of Fame, National Tractor Puller Association Hall of Fame, and the Summit County Sports Hall of Fame. He is a three time World Land Speed record holder. He held the Unlimited Drag Racing Record and was a champion Tractor Puller.

- He was inducted into the Motorsports Hall of Fame of America in 1991.

== Death and interment ==
Arfons died on December 3, 2007, in Springfield Township, Ohio, at the age of 81. He was interred at Mount Peace Cemetery.

== Bibliography ==
- Shapiro, Harvey (1997). Man Against the Salt. London: Minerva Press. ISBN 978-1-85863-898-0.
