= Lou Santiago =

American television personality

Lou Santiago (born 1963) is a retired U.S. Navy Seabee, an automotive builder and fabricator, and television host/personality.

== Early life ==
Lou was born on a Monday, in May 1963, in the Bronx, New York, to Lily, an aspiring school teacher and Raul Santiago, an ironworker. His parents and two siblings later moved from The Bronx to Hempstead, Long Island hoping to achieve the American dream of suburbia. In Long Island, he graduated from Uniondale High School where he attended a two-year trade program in diesel mechanics with the Board of Cooperative Education Services, better known as “B.O.C.E.S.”

While B.O.C.E.S. only added to his knowledge of car building, Lou had already begun his lust for car building at the age of 13 with his longtime friend and MOPAR fanatic, Wayne Swanson. Their love for street racing with Wayne's ’68 Dart with a 340 and later 383 with a 4-speed involved budget car building and creative fabrication. His Navy career only increased his desire for building very cool cars. His work required that he maintain heavy equipment and when overseas with parts sparse, the need for creative fabrication became invaluable.

== Career ==
Lou joined the U.S. Navy in 1981 as a Seabee mechanic supporting Navy Seal Team Eight. Lou was responsible for maintaining heavy equipment that was vital to the safety and support of Team Eight. His fabrication abilities were an asset, as parts were sparse and conditions intense. After a decorated career, Lou took an early retirement in 1997 to care for his wife.

After retiring from the military, Lou earned an Associate's Degree in Human Behavior from Central Piedmont Community College in Charlotte, NC. He began working as a Behavior Management Technician at a school for children with behavior challenges. A fabricator at heart, he turned his sights on building muscle cars, starting with transmissions, brackets, roll cages and chassis and performance parts.

In 2005, Lou was given the opportunity to showcase his talents on Spike TV's MuscleCar. Lou was the Host of MuscleCar for 44 episodes chronicling a multitude of car builds and entertaining viewers with his charismatic personality.

In 2009, Lou joined the Discovery Channel as a host for ten episodes of Ultimate Car Build-Off.

After filming his eighth season as co-host of the Car Fix program, seen on Velocity, by Discovery, Lou decided to walk away from network television. "It was just time to get out," he was quoted in a 2020 magazine story produced by Strutmasters.com. "I decided it was time to be a master of my own destiny."

== Podcast ==
In 2021 Lou Santiago, alongside John Galante, co-hosted a podcast, entitled, “3 Lefts Don’t Make a Right”. The show covers everything from current events, trends, cars, legends in the industry, to automotive news. 3 Lefts Don't Make a Right has featured top-line who's who in the automotive world, including guests such as 'Richard Rawlings, Wayne Carini, John Schneider, Courtney Hansen, Gene Winfield, Rick Dore, John D’Agostino, Craig Jackson, Stacey David, Linda Vaughn, Joe and Amanda Martin, Ian Roussel, Ralph Gilles, Dennis McCarthy, Faye Hadley, Bogi, Cristy Lee and Bad Chad'. The podcast is filmed live. The show's demographic is worldwide, primarily men 25 to 65. 3 Lefts Don't Make a Right is produced by Bozeken Productions.

Using space donated by Strutmasters founder Chip Lofton, Santiago set up a shop at Roxboro, NC, and launched his own channel on YouTube, Garage Insider TV. Widely known as a walking automotive encyclopedia, Lou wants to continue his mission of sharing knowledge with mechanics of all ages. With projects ranging from a ground-up restoration of a classic Chevrolet Chevelle to rebuilding an engine on a Chevy Suburban, Santiago uses the program as a "How To" resource for car enthusiasts everywhere.

Santiago was also an instructor at Central Piedmont Community College near his home.

== Personal life ==
Lou lives in North Carolina. He is married and has four children.
