= ESPN2 Garage =

- Starring: various (See below)
- Country of origin: United States

Production
- Running time: 90 minutes

Original release
- Network: ESPN2 (2007-)
- Release: January 6, 2007 – November 15, 2014

ESPN2 Garage was a new ninety-minute programming block dedicated to the automotive and motorsports world on ESPN2. Debuted on Saturday, January 6, 2007, the programming aired on ESPN2 from 5 p.m. ET to 6:30 p.m. ET on weekdays, from 10 a.m. ET to 12pm ET on Saturdays and from 10 a.m. ET to 11 a.m. ET on Sundays. This programming block was the predecessor to the new daily automotive news and analysis program, NASCAR Now.

ESPN2 Garage programming covered topics ranging from car preparation (Matching Numbers, Garage Wars), automotive auctions (The Bidding Wars, RM Classic Car Auctions), how-to help (Import Racers, GearZ), racing programs (Race Wizard with Ray Evernham, Michael Waltrip Racing: A New Era), automotive entertainment/reality (P.I.P.E.S., King of the Street), and even featured an animated series about a family of motorsports fans entitled The Pits.

== Programs ==
=== Autotrader.com DRIVE in HD ===
- (Times TBD)

Former Motor Trend magazine editor C. Van Tune and others will take viewers behind the scenes at different auto shows in the United States. Hosts will analyze the latest models, concept cars and other automotive industry innovations at shows in Los Angeles, Detroit, Chicago and New York.

=== The Bidding Wars ===
- (2nd quarter, Sunday, 10 a.m.)

Focuses on car auctions from the buyers, sellers and auction officials’ points of view. These colorful characters are followed until the final two bidders on a car battle it out.

=== Chopper Nation ===
- (1st quarter, Saturday, 10:30 a.m.)

For motorcycle enthusiasts, a series dedicated the world of choppers and v-twin cruiser motorcycles with profiles on custom builders and motorcycle rallies.

=== Funk Master Flex's Car Wars ===
- (2nd quarter, Saturday 10:30 a.m., Monday 6 p.m.)

Amateur customizers prepare their cars for one of Funkmaster Flex's car shows. Contestants risk their finances (second mortgage, rent money, etc.) to win while dealing with the stress and realities of competition. Flex, a DJ, radio personality, and the show's host, helps them along.

=== Garage Wars ===
- (4th quarter, Saturday 10 a.m.)

A non-stop, deadline-driven show. In each episode, a real mechanic and a “crew” of four regular guys (the contestants) are pitted against a similar group. With three days and $10,000 to spend, each team has to design, find parts for, and then build their racer from the ground up.

=== GearZ ===
- (2nd quarter, Saturday 10 a.m.)

Hosted by Stacey David (previously on Spike's popular and highly rated series Trucks!), Gearz is a how-to program that will focus on trucks, hot rods, and other rides. Each episode will include David completing a high-end build and then taking it out on the road, off-road or in the mud for a true test drive.

=== Import Racers ===
- (1st quarter, Monday, 5 p.m.)
- A series covering import tuner cars, including sport compact drag racing and drifting. Import tuner racing and customizing have seen significant growth in popularity in the United States.

=== King of the Streets ===
- (3rd quarter, Saturday 10 a.m.)

A reality game show in which 13 amateur drag racers compete against each other for the title “King of the Streets.” After each win, the contestant must decide whether to keep the winnings and go home or to keep on going to become King of the Street. Hosted by the fastest couple in the world, NHRA stars Melanie Troxel and Tommie Johnson Jr.

=== Matching Numbers ===
- (4th quarter, Saturday and Sunday, 10 a.m.)

A show that takes collectible cars that have been left to rot and rust and turns back the clock to their original beauty.

=== Metric Revolution Bike Competition ===
- (2nd quarter, Saturday 11 a.m.)

Competition focused on motorcyclists who love personalizing their bikes. The 22 contestants concentrate on metric bikes to create outrageous custom machines.

=== Michael Waltrip Racing: A New Era ===
- (1st quarter, Sunday 10 a.m.)

This series will follow the establishment of Michael Waltrip's Toyota team which will make its NASCAR Cup Series debut in 2007. Sometimes ESPN NASCAR analyst Dale Jarrett will drive one of the cars in next year's racing season.

=== Mother's Car Show ===
- (2nd and 3rd quarters, time TBD)

Showcases for cars, bikes, trucks, sport compacts, street rods and others. The Mother's crew will be everywhere from Ocala, Fla., to Omaha, Neb.

=== P.I.P.E.S. ===
- (2nd quarter, Saturday, 10:30 a.m.)

Challengers modify their tuner car to race in a “king of the hill” competition, with the eventual series winner taking home a cash prize. The tuner must achieve a predetermined horsepower and fuel efficiency rating - plus run on pump gas. Viewers will gain insight on how to boost their own car's performance and make it fuel efficient.

=== The Pits ===
- (4th quarter, Saturday 11 a.m., weekday TBD)

Animated series based on the lives of a family of motorsports fans and their adventures living on the road and following the racing circuit. Viewers can follow along with true motorsports fans and see the lengths they go to make their dreams come true.

=== Race Wizard with Ray Evernham ===
- (3rd quarter, Sunday 10 a.m.)

Four race fans. Four race questions. Answered by Ray Evernham, champion NASCAR crew chief and owner of Evernham Motorsports. Each show will bring racing's innovation and technology down to a level that anyone who drives a car can understand. Segments will unlock the secrets of racing and take viewers behind the scenes to see how it all happens.

=== RM Classic Car Auctions ===
- (1st and 3rd quarters, Thursday and Friday, 5 p.m.)

Set at one of the biggest auction houses in the country, viewers will see the auction scene in Monterey, Calif., showing exotic cars being sold for astronomical prices.

=== SpeedFreaks ===
- (1st and 2nd quarter, Saturday 11:30 a.m.)

Four colorful characters featured in motorsports radio show taped on-site at some of the top auto racing events around the country. Includes interviews with top drivers, crew chiefs, and auto racing experts talking all things motorsports.

=== Truck Stop ===
- (1st quarter, Saturday 10 a.m., Tuesday and Wednesday, 5 p.m.)

A series dedicated to the world of trucks, from high performance to off-road 4x4 machines to Monster Trucks.
