= Uniondale High School =

High school in Uniondale, New York, United States

Location
- 933 Goodrich St; Uniondale, (Nassau County), New York 11553; United States; 40.7060°N 73.5811°W

Information
- School type: Public, high school
- School district: Uniondale Union Free School District
- NCES District ID: 3629280
- Superintendent: Monique Darrisaw-Akil
- CEEB code: 335668
- NCES School ID: 362928003944
- Principal: Shawn Brown
- Teaching staff: 162.73 FTEs
- Grades: 9–12; Ungraded
- Gender: Coeducational
- Enrollment: 2,106 (as of 2024-2025)
- Student to teacher ratio: 12.94
- Campus: Suburb: Large
- Colors: Black and Gold
- Mascot: Knights
- Alumni: Aljamain Sterling, Sheryl Lee Ralph, Busta Rhymes, T.O.R.O

Uniondale High School is a public high school located in Uniondale, in Nassau County, New York, United States. It is the only high school operated by the Uniondale Union Free School District.

== Demographics ==
As of the 2014-15 school year, the school had an enrollment of 2,220 students and 153.0 classroom teachers (on an FTE basis), for a student–teacher ratio of 14.5:1. There were 1,187 students (53.5% of enrollment) eligible for free lunch and 251 (11.3% of students) eligible for reduced-cost lunch.

== Alumni ==
- Taylor Darling, politician, New York State Assembly (18th District)
- Jennifer Carroll, politician, 18th Lieutenant Governor of the U.S. state of Florida, served in the Florida House of Representatives from 2003 until 2010.
- Christian Cooper, birder, author, and Emmy-winning host of National Geographic's Extraordinary Birder; former Marvel Comics editor
- Harry T. Edwards, Senior Circuit Judge and Chief Judge Emeritus on the United States Court of Appeals for the D.C. Circuit in Washington, D.C.; Professor of Law at the New York University School of Law.
- Jimmy Lewis, All-American lacrosse player at Navy from 1964 to 1966
- Sheryl Lee Ralph, Broadway actress and singer.
- Lou Santiago, television host of MuscleCar, Ultimate Car Build-Off, and Car Fix
- Winsome Sinclair, casting director and film producer
- Gregory Sleet, Chief Judge of the United States District Court for the District of Delaware
- Willie Smith, sprinter, won gold at the 1984 Olympics as part of the 4 × 400 m relay squad
- William Stanback, football player
- Aljamain Sterling, professional mixed martial artist, former UFC Bantamweight Champion
- Alex Stewart, former NFL player
- Andrew Stewart, former NFL player
- Andrew Quarless, NFL Tight End for the Green Bay Packers
- Busta Rhymes, rapper
- John Moschitta Jr., singer, actor, voice actor
- Gary "Baba Booey" Dell'Abate, radio producer
