= Andrew Stewart (gridiron football) =

American gridiron football player (born 1965)

No. 96, 76, 73, 93
- Position: Defensive end

Personal information
- Born: November 20, 1965 (age 61); Kingston, Jamaica
- Listed height: 6 ft 5 in (1.96 m)
- Listed weight: 275 lb (125 kg)

Career information
- High school: Uniondale (Uniondale, New York, U.S.)
- College: Cincinnati
- NFL draft: 1989: 4th round, 107th overall pick

Career history
- Cleveland Browns (1989–1990); Cincinnati Bengals (1991–1992); San Francisco 49ers (1993)*; Ottawa Rough Riders (1993); BC Lions (1994–1995); Toronto Argonauts (1996–1997); Saskatchewan Roughriders (1998–1999); Winnipeg Blue Bombers (1999)
- * Offseason or practice squad member only

Awards and highlights
- 3× Grey Cup champion (1994, 1996, 1997); CFL Northern All-Star (1995)
- Stats at Pro Football Reference

Andrew Stewart (born November 20, 1965) is an American former professional football defensive end who played in the National Football League (NFL) and Canadian Football League (CFL). He was selected by the Cleveland Browns in the fourth round of the 1989 NFL draft. He played college football at Fresno City and Cincinnati. He was also a member of the Cincinnati Bengals, San Francisco 49ers, Ottawa Rough Riders, BC Lions, Toronto Argonauts, Saskatchewan Roughriders and Winnipeg Blue Bombers.

== Early life and college ==
Stewart attended Malverne High School in Malverne, New York and Uniondale High School in Uniondale, New York.

Stewart played for the Fresno City Rams of Fresno City College in 1985.

Stewart played for the Cincinnati Bearcats of the University of Cincinnati from 1986 to 1988, recording career totals of 36 tackles for loss and sixteen sacks. He set the school's single season sack record with nine in 1987. He also played in the East–West Shrine Game and Senior Bowl.

== Professional career ==
=== National Football League ===
Stewart was selected by the Cleveland Browns with the 107th pick in the 1989 NFL draft. He won the Maurice Bassett Award in 1989. The Award is given to the Browns' most outstanding rookie in training camp as voted by the local media. He played in all 16 games for the Browns during the 1989 season, recording three sacks. Stewart was released by the Browns on November 28, 1990, after having spent the prior three months on injured reserve due to an Achilles tendon injury. He signed with the Cincinnati Bengals during the 1991 off-season. He suffered a torn knee ligament July 31, 1991, and missed the 1991 and 1992 seasons. Stewart was signed by the San Francisco 49ers after his contract with the Bengals ran out. He suffered a right hand injury during a preseason game in 1993. He was released by the team later in 1993.

=== Canadian Football League ===
Stewart was signed with the Ottawa Rough Riders in October 1993 and played in six games for the team during the 1993 season. He was traded to the BC Lions in June 1994 with Angelo Snipes and Denny Chronopoulos for Kent Warnock and BC's second round pick in the 1995 CFL draft. He played two seasons for the Lions, earning CFL Northern All-Star honors in 1995 when he recorded five sacks. The Lions won the 82nd Grey Cup against the Baltimore Football Club on November 27, 1994. Stewart signed with the Toronto Argonauts for the 1996 season and played for the team from 1996 to 1997, compiling eight sacks in 1997. He won back to back Grey Cups with the team in 1996 and 1997. He was traded to the Saskatchewan Roughriders in May 1998 and was released by the Roughriders in May 1999. Stewart signed with the Winnipeg Blue Bombers and played for them during the 1999 season.

He retired from football in 2001.

== Personal life ==
Andrew's brother Alex also played football. In 1991, Andrew claimed that he was released by the Browns after not retaining agent Bruce Allen. In 2012, a judge ordered the Bert Bell/Pete Rozelle NFL Player Retirement Plan to provide disability benefits to Stewart after he had initially been refused an NFL pension. In 2016, Stewart was diagnosed with cancer.
