= Alex Stewart (American football) =

Jamaican gridiron football player (born 1964)

Profile
- Position: Defensive end

Personal information
- Born: August 24, 1964 (age 62); Kingston, Jamaica
- Listed height: 6 ft 3 in (1.91 m)
- Listed weight: 262 lb (119 kg)

Career information
- High school: Uniondale (NY)
- College: Cal State-Fullerton
- NFL draft: 1989: 8th round, 219th overall pick

Career history
- Minnesota Vikings (1989); Dallas Cowboys (1989)*; Houston Oilers (1990); BC Lions (1995)*
- * Offseason or practice squad member only

Alex Stewart (born August 24, 1964) is a Jamaican-born former professional football defensive end in the National Football League (NFL) for the Minnesota Vikings and Dallas Cowboys. He played college football at Cal State Fullerton.

== Early life ==
Stewart was born in the West Indies (Kingston), Jamaica on August 24, 1964. In December 1977, his family migrated to Canada to avoid the political turmoil of his native country.

He eventually moved to the United States. Stewart first played high school football at Malverne High School in Malverne, New York, before transferring to play football at Uniondale High School in Uniondale, New York.

== College career ==
He moved on to Nassau Community College but did not play football. He began his college career at Fresno City College for two seasons and earned J.C. Grid-Wire All-American honors. He later moved on to the University of Southern California. After the firing of head coach Ted Tollner and not playing in any games, he decided to transfer to Cal State Fullerton to play out his final year of eligibility.

As a senior, he was played mostly at nose guard. After being slowed by injuries early on the year, he finished with 38 tackles and 9 sacks in eight games. He was named the North's outstanding defensive player (registering 3 sacks) at the 1988 Senior Bowl and also played in the 1989 Blue-Gray Game.

== Professional career ==
=== Pre-draft measurables ===
At the 1989 NFL Scouting Combine, he ran a 4.7 40-yard dash, had a 37.5 inches vertical leap, a 10-feet-3 broad jump and recorded 27 consecutive repetitions at 225 pounds in the bench press, which outdid almost every lineman.

=== Minnesota Vikings ===
Stewart was selected by the Minnesota Vikings in the eighth round (219th overall) of the 1989 NFL draft to play defensive end, which was his natural position. He was in contention for a starting spot on the defensive line, until breaking his wrist a few weeks before the season.

On October 12, he was sent to the Dallas Cowboys as part of the Herschel Walker trade.

=== Dallas Cowboys ===
When he was traded to the Dallas Cowboys, he was still on the disabled list and spent his time on the practice squad. He was waived on November 9, 1989, after suspicions of steroid use.

After waiving Stewart, the Cowboys threatened to waive the other Vikings players that came in the Herschel Walker trade, in order to get all of the conditional draft picks. Head coach Jimmy Johnson eventually had second thoughts on the February 1 deadline and traded three future draft choices (third-round and tenth-round in 1990 and a third-round in 1991) to the Vikings for the right to retain the original full package of draft choices, plus Issiac Holt, Jesse Solomon and David Howard.

=== Houston Oilers ===
On April 3, 1990, he signed as a free agent with the Houston Oilers. A sprained knee limited his play in training camp and was eventually cut.

=== BC Lions ===
Stewart was signed by the BC Lions of the Canadian Football League in October 1995, but was released before the start of the season.

== Personal life ==
His brother Andrew Stewart played defensive end in the NFL for the Cleveland Browns and the Cincinnati Bengals. He also played in the CFL with the Ottawa Rough Riders (1993), BC Lions (1994–1995), Toronto Argonauts (1996–1997), Saskatchewan Roughriders (1998–1999), and Winnipeg Blue Bombers (1999).
