= MuscleCar =

American television series

MuscleCar is a television program whose hosts demonstrate how to rebuild muscle cars while sharing information about these cars and their history. It became a part of a group of shows called the Powerblock, currently shown on Spike TV, on January 7, 2006.

The original co-hosts of the show were Lou Santiago and Jared Zimmerman, however midway through the first season, Zimmerman quit to return to Rad Rides by Troy, the custom car shop he had been employed with prior to joining the MuscleCar team. After Zimmerman's departure, Santiago remained the show's only host and relied on various shop assistants and fabricators to help with tasks when they required more than one person. As of the October 1st, 2007 taping, Rick Bacon (AKA The Arsonist) was added as the new co-host with Santiago.

Santiago remained co-host of the series until his last taping of the show on Friday, October 26, 2007. The final show with him as host aired on February 17, 2008 with his on-air official announcement of his departure. However, he made his first announcement while being interviewed the week following October 26, 2007 by Kevin Oeste of V8TV, at the SEMA Show in Las Vegas. After Lou left Muscle Car, Rick became host along with Brent Buttrey. Brent has since been replaced as co-host by Tommy Boshers.

On the July 7, 2012 episode of MuscleCar, it was announced that Rick had been replaced by "Hollywood TV and movie car builder" Steve Mank. This ends Bacon's near-100 episode reign as host of MuscleCar - by far the longest tenure for a host on the show. Boshers still remains on the show, but has now inherited the mantle of main show host.
