= General Electric CJ805 =

Civil series of the J79 turbojet aircraft engine

CJ805
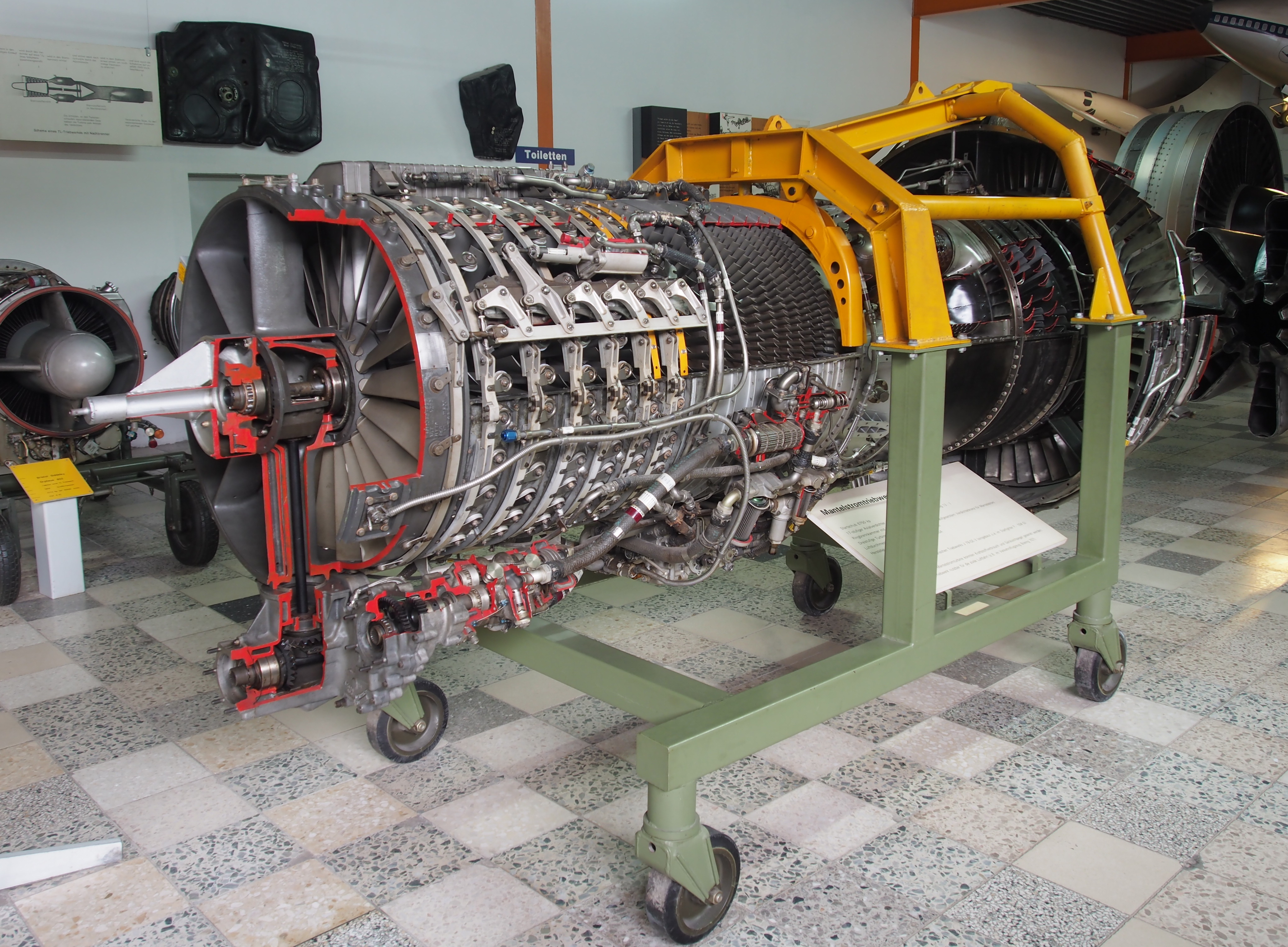
- A CJ805-21 turbofan on display at Flugausstellung Hermeskeil. Note the visible fan stage at the rear of the engine casing, unlike the more common shaft driven fan located to the front.
- Type: Turbojet (CJ805); Turbofan (CJ805-23)
- National origin: United States
- Manufacturer: General Electric Aircraft Engines
- Major applications: CJ805: Convair 880; CJ805-23: Convair 990 Coronado
- Developed from: General Electric J79

The General Electric CJ805 is a jet engine which was developed by General Electric Aircraft Engines in the late 1950s. It was a civilian version of the J79 and differed only in detail. It was developed in two versions. The basic CJ805-3 was a turbojet and powered the Convair 880 airliner, and the CJ805-23 (military designation TF35) a turbofan derivative which powered the Convair 990 Coronado variant of the 880.

== Design and development ==
=== Impetus ===
Turbojet engines consist of a compressor at the front, a burner area, and then a turbine that powers the compressor. In order to reach worthwhile compression ratios, compressors consist of multiple "stages", each further compressing the air leaving the previous one.

One common problem with early jet engines was the phenomenon of "surging" or compressor stall. Stalls could occur when the approaching airflow was not in-line with the aircraft inlet to the compressor or when the throttle was advanced too quickly.

When engines had to be designed with pressure ratios greater than about 5, to meet demands for reduced fuel consumption, a new stalling phenomenon came to light, rotating stall. It occurred at low compressor speeds and caused blades in the first stage to break. This troublesome speed area is known as "off-design" and required the invention of special devices to make the compressor work. The compressor worked well near its maximum speed, known as "design", with a fixed area convergence from entry to exit to go with the design values of compression/density and with fixed blade angles set to give low pressure losses. At low speeds the much lower compression didn't squeeze the air enough to get through the now too-small exit. The velocity triangle combined the now too-slow entry air with the blade speed and gave a stalling angle.

One common solution used on early engines, and widely used today, was to give the air extra escape holes to speed up the entry air, i.e. the use of "bleed air" which is allowed to escape from openings near the middle of the compressor stages and vented overboard. The bleed valves close as the engine RPM increases towards operational speeds.

Another solution was the use of variable inlet vanes. The angle of incidence of the vanes at the front of the engine is changed to partially block the inlet area, which reduces the compression, and also angle the air onto the compressor blades to prevent stalling. This has the advantage of being more efficient than allowing valuable compressed air to escape, although fuel consumption at low speeds is relatively unimportant.

Further increases in pressure ratio, demanded by government procurement agencies and commercial airlines for long-range aircraft, caused a bigger mismatch of flow areas/density changes and blade angles. Two approaches were followed: slowing the blade speeds at the front of the compressor by splitting it into two separately rotating parts (spools) or making stators variable on the first few stages as well as the inlet vanes. A disadvantage is significant mechanical complexity as each stator blade has to be independently rotated to the desired angles. Two spools need more bearings and turned out to be heavier.

Bleed valves, two or three spools and variable stators are all used together on modern engines to cope with rotating stall during starts and at low speeds and to allow surge-free fast accelerations.

Rolls-Royce considered the variable stator idea in the 1940s, but abandoned it until using it in the 1980s on the V2500 engine. They began development of two-spool designs, a concept that was also selected by Pratt & Whitney. The variable stator path was only selected by GE after a year-long design study competition comparing two spools and several stages of variable stators with objectives of efficient performance at cruise Mach 0.9 and at Mach 2, increased thrust, reduced fuel consumption and weight. The J79 emerged as a powerful, lightweight design 2,000 lb lighter than its 2-shaft competitor for the B-58, the J57 engine, and GE began considering it as the basis for a high-power engine for commercial use.

=== CJ805 program ===
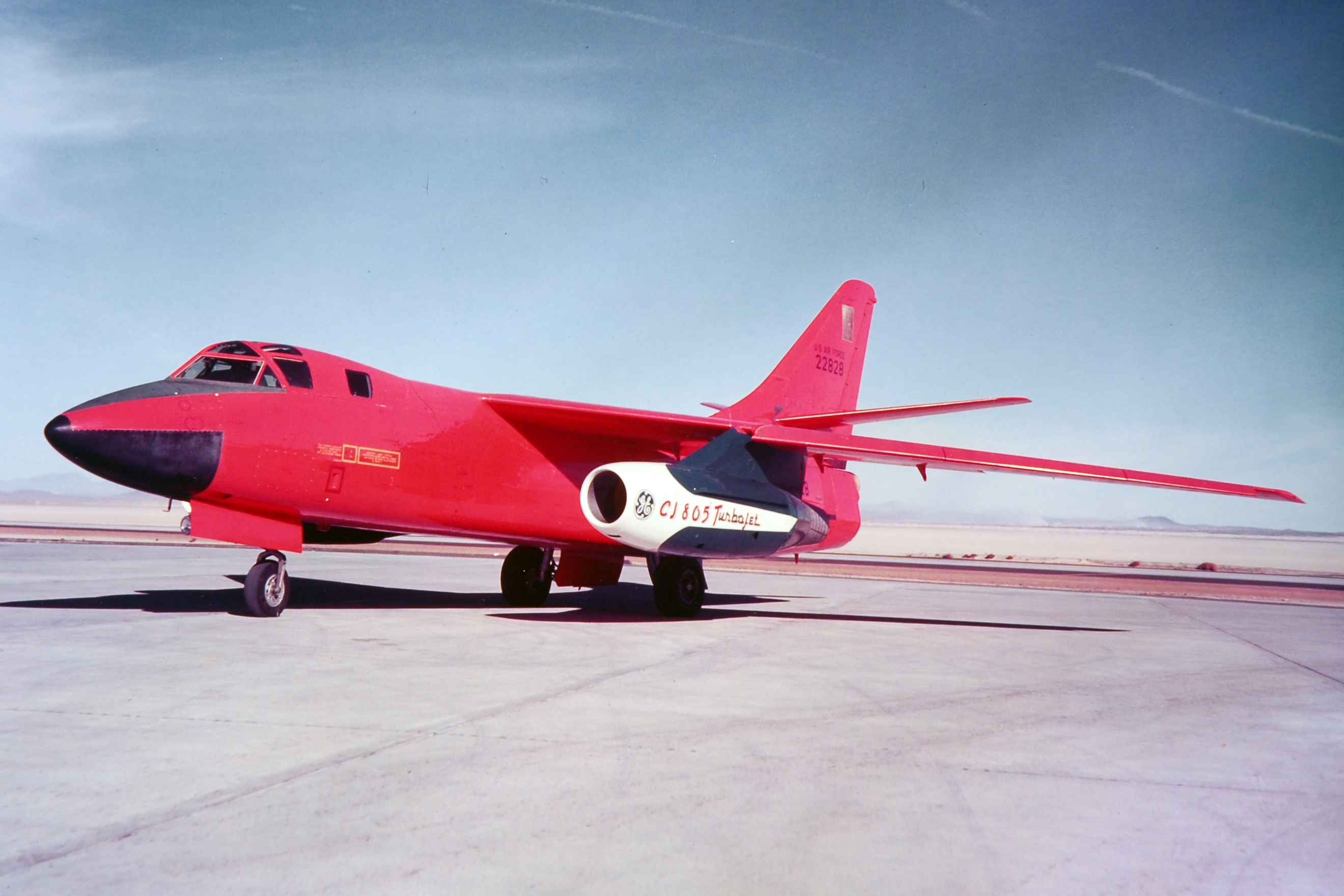
A Douglas RB-66A test aircraft powered by two GE CJ805-3 engines, on the ramp at Edwards AFB

In 1952, Chapman Walker's design team at GE built a one-off prototype of a jet engine designed specifically for transatlantic airliners. It used a single-stage fan powered by the same turbine shaft as the main engine compressor, as opposed to the Pratt & Whitney designs that were using a separate power shaft to run the fan. The GE design proved to be difficult to start and operate and was not developed further.

In 1955 Jack Parker took over GE's Aircraft Gas Turbine division. He hired Dixon Speas to begin interviewing executives at airlines to try to get a sense of the future market. Parker asked Speas to interview not the CEOs, but executives that might be the CEO by the time GE was ready to enter the civilian jet engine market. Parker, Speas and Neil Burgess, who ran the J79 program, spent a month meeting with American Airlines, Delta, United, KLM, Swissair and SAS. The meetings demonstrated that those airlines that were flying propeller aircraft across the Atlantic were all looking to replace them with jets.

=== CJ805-3 ===
Around the same time, Convair was canvassing US carriers and found demand for a smaller jet aircraft for medium-range domestic routes. They began development of what would become the 880, and approached Burgess to see if GE could develop a version of the J79 for this role. Burgess responded by quickly sketching a version of the J79 with the afterburner removed and replaced by a thrust reverser, giving them an estimated unit price of $125,000 per engine.

The 880's primary sales feature over the competing Douglas DC-8 and Boeing 707 was a higher cruise speed. This demanded more engine power from a lighter design, which naturally led to a design like the J79. To gain experience with the engine in a civil setting, GE equipped a Douglas RB-66 with the new engine and flew simulated civil aviation routes out of Edwards Air Force Base.

As development progressed, the 707 began to enter service, and noise complaints became a serious issue. There was already a lawsuit, by residents around Newark airport, concerning the noise from existing propeller-driven aircraft such as the Lockheed Super Constellation, Boeing Stratocruiser and Douglas DC-7C. One way to reduce this problem is to mix cold air into the jet exhaust, which was accomplished on early engines with the addition of scalloped nozzles. (Note: Which has re-appeared in modern form on the Boeing 787.) This solution was also adopted for the CJ805.

=== CJ805-23 ===
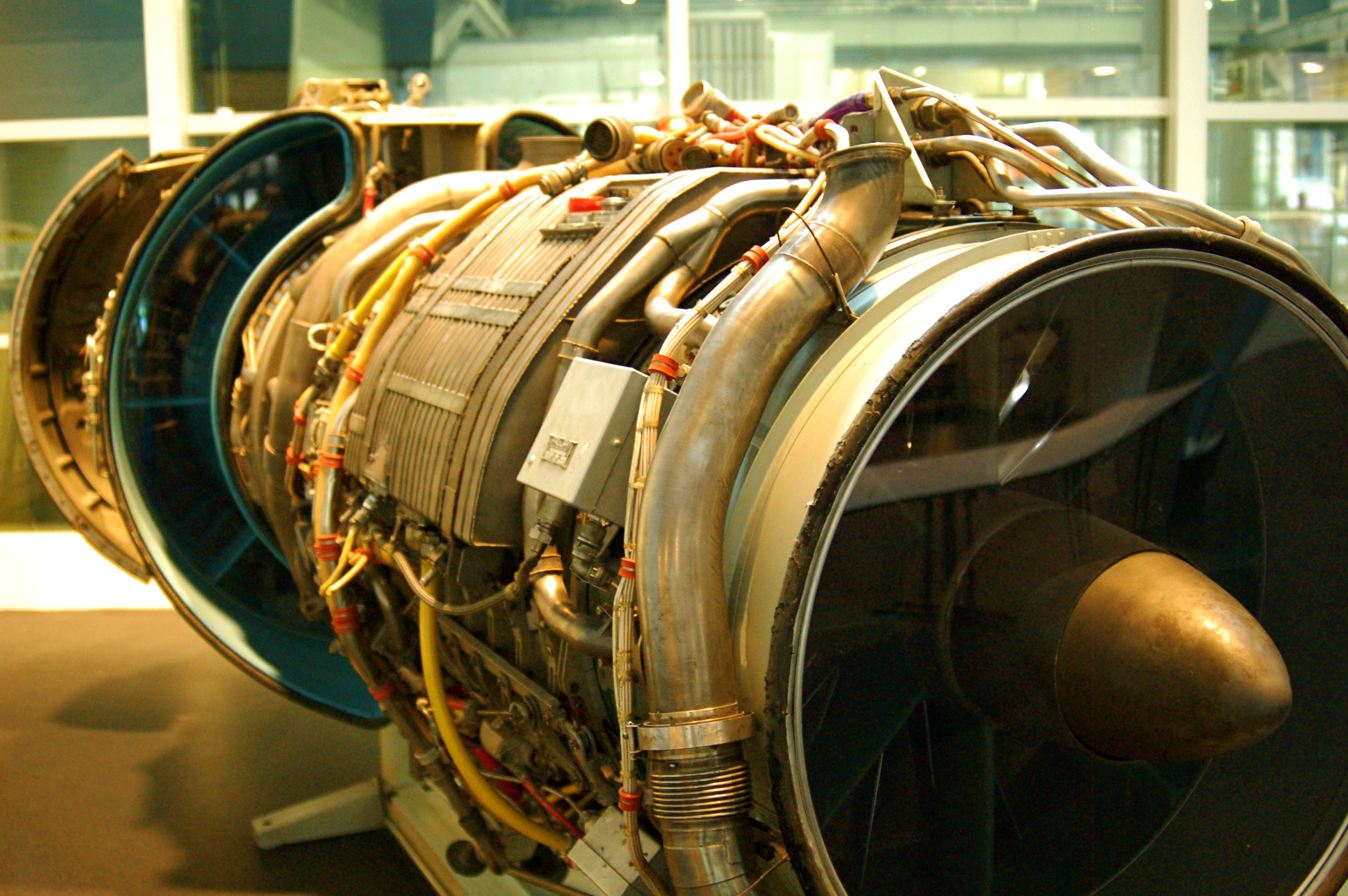
Cutaway of a CJ805-23, the turbofan version of the engine, with fan at the rear

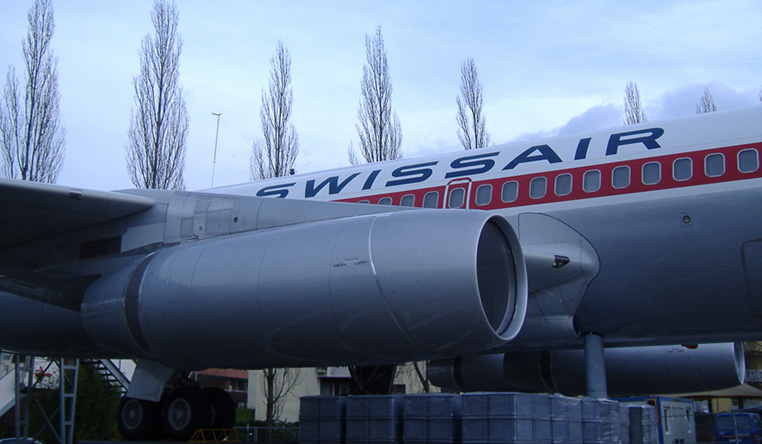
The turbofan CJ805-23 powered the Convair 990 airliners

Several airlines asked Convair for a larger version of the 880 with potential transatlantic range. Such a design would be larger to hold more seating, as well as having to carry more fuel. To power it, a more powerful engine would be needed. By this time, the Rolls-Royce Conway was entering service, and the Pratt & Whitney JT3D was following close behind. These designs both had twin-spool compressors, as opposed to using variable stators, and the lower speed of the front, low-pressure, spool made it easy to power a fan.

The problems RR and P&W had addressed with the two-spool system had been solved on the J79 with the variable stators, so in relative terms, the single compressor rotational speed was much faster than the low-pressure stage of these other engines. This meant it was not suitable for direct connection to a fan stage. Instead, GE solved this problem with the addition of a completely separate fan system at the rear of the engine, powered by a new turbine stage. The system was essentially a bolt-on extension to the existing design and had almost no effect on the operation of the original engine.

Each turbine blade was an integral part of a "blucket", the outboard section of which was a fan rotor blade. Running freely on a stub shaft, a series of buckets, mounted on a disc, made up the aft rotor assembly. The efflux from the turbojet expanded through the (inner) turbine annulus, thus providing power directly to the fan blades located in the outer annulus. A full-length cowl, an annular exhaust system and a bucket thrust-reverser were fitted for the Convair 990.

The unique feature of the CJ805-23 was the transonic single stage fan. NACA had done significant research on multistage transonic compressors during the 1950s. Using this data, GE decided to design and test a high-pressure ratio single stage transonic fan. Much to their amazement the unit more than met the design target, including that of high efficiency. A modified version of this research unit was subsequently incorporated into the CJ805-23 aft fan. With no experience of transonic fan design and little time available, Pratt & Whitney had to resort to using 2 fan stages to produce a similar pressure ratio for their JT-3D turbofan. Although not an overhung design, the CJ805-23 transonic fan did not require any inlet guide vanes. There was, however, a series of structural vanes to help support the fan casing.

=== Production ends ===
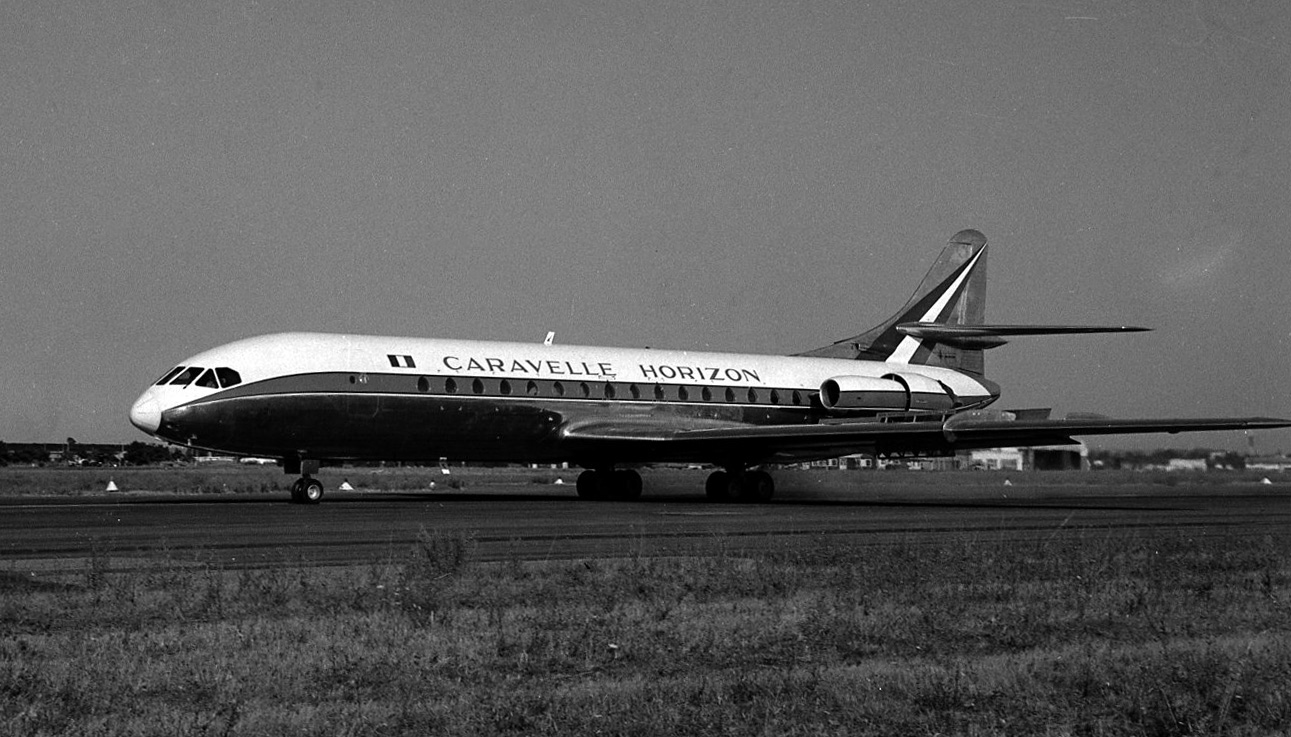
The CJ805-23-powered Sud Caravelle 10A prototype, showing the short fan cowling.

With additional changes, fuselage stretches, and the addition of anti-shock bodies, the new airliner emerged as the Convair 990. However, by this time the project had suffered several delays, allowing new versions of the DC-8 and 707 to lock up major sales. In the end, Convair sold only 102 880s and 990s in total, losing $600 million on the program.

There was only one other customer for the 805-23. In 1961, Sud Aviation approached GE to pitch them on the idea of adapting the Rolls-Royce Avon powered Caravelle to the 805-23, producing a flying technology showcase for both companies. For this role they introduced a new version with a relatively short fan cowl and thrust reverser, compared to the full-length cowling on the 990. Rolls-Royce quickly built and tested an aft-fan demonstrator Avon to compete with the greater thrust and lower specific fuel consumption of the CJ805-23. In the end, the Caravelle was instead re-engined with the Pratt & Whitney JT8D turbofan.

The CJ805 program was not a commercial success, and GE lost approximately $80 million on the program with only a few hundred engines produced in total. In service, the design proved fragile, but these problems led to the program's ultimate success for the company.

During the time they were talking to airline CEOs, in 1956 the company hired the former head of American Airlines' maintenance department, John Montgomery, to run the production lines. Montgomery gathered comments from the industry on the state of the engine market, and found that many were complaining about the unreliability of the large piston engines then being used, notably the Wright R-3350. Wright management refused to put more money into the program to improve the engine, leading to a serious backlash from the customers.

Montgomery hired Walter Van Duyan away from Wright to set up GE's service department, and they provided excellent service in spite of the engine's problems. GE quickly gained a reputation for standing behind their products that endures to this day.

The work on the 805 also had several spin-off products. Among them was another aft-fan design, the General Electric CF700 used in the Dassault Falcon 20 business jet, which was developed from the General Electric J85 in the same way as the J79 was adapted to the 805. Their fan technology was also used in the XV-5 Vertifan.

== Variants and applications ==
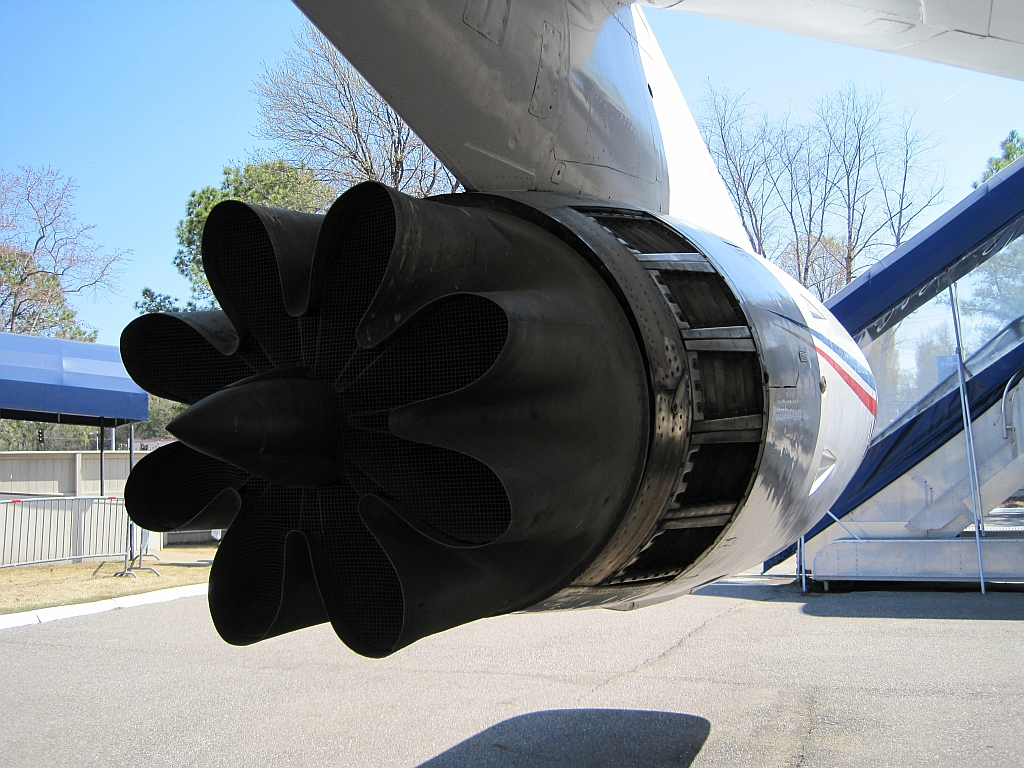
Rear view of a CJ805-3 turbojet equipped with a scalloped nozzle hush kit

CJ805-1
CJ805-2
CJ805-3
Convair 880
CJ805-3A
Convair 880-22 : Revised variable inlet guide vane and stator control.
CJ805-3B
Convair 880-22M : Increased thrust.
CJ805-11
CJ805-13
CJ805-21
CJ805-23
Flight testing in a Douglas RB-66: Aft-fan variant with a direct drive fan attached to a free-running LP turbine.
CJ805-23A
CJ805-23B
Convair 990 Coronado
CJ805-23C
Intended for the proposed Sud Aviation Caravelle 10A. Only a single airframe, intended as a prototype for the US market, was equipped with the CJ805.
TF35
Military version of the CJ805-23 turbofan.

== Specifications (CJ805-3B) ==
Data from FAA Type Certificate Data Sheet, E-306

==== General characteristics ====
- Type: Single-spool turbojet
- Length: 188.9 in (4,798 mm) with thrust reverser/suppressor
- Diameter: 31.6 in (803 mm)
- Dry weight: 3,213 lb (1,457 kg) with thrust reverser/suppressor

==== Components ====
- Compressor: 17-stage axial flow
- Combustors: can-annular
- Turbine: 2× gas generator power stages
- Fuel type: Aviation kerosene
- Oil system: pressure spray/splash

==== Performance ====
- Maximum thrust: 11,650 lbf (51.82 kN) for take-off
- Overall pressure ratio: 13:1
- Air mass flow: 167.9 lb/s (76.16 kg/s)
- Turbine inlet temperature: ~1205K
- Specific fuel consumption: 0.784 lb/(lb·h) (22.21 g/(s kN))
- Thrust-to-weight ratio: 3.626

== Specifications (CJ805-23B) ==
Data from

==== General characteristics ====
- Type: Aft-fan unmixed turbofan
- Length: 139 in (3,531 mm)
- Diameter: 53 in (1,346 mm)
- Dry weight: 3,730 lb (1,692 kg)

==== Components ====
- Compressor: 17-stage axial flow
- Combustors: can-annular
- Turbine: 2× gas generator power stages + 1× free running turbine with fan blades on the periphery
- Fuel type: Aviation kerosene
- Oil system: pressure spray/splash

==== Performance ====
- Maximum thrust: 16,100 lbf (71.62 kN) for take-off
- Overall pressure ratio: 13:1
- Air mass flow: 426 lb/s (193.2 kg/s)
- Turbine inlet temperature: ~1205 K
- Specific fuel consumption: 0.56 lb/(lb·h) (15.86 g/(s kN))
- Thrust-to-weight ratio: 4.32

== See also ==
Related development

- General Electric J79

Related lists

- List of aircraft engines
