= Jessi Combs =

American racer and TV personality (1980–2019)

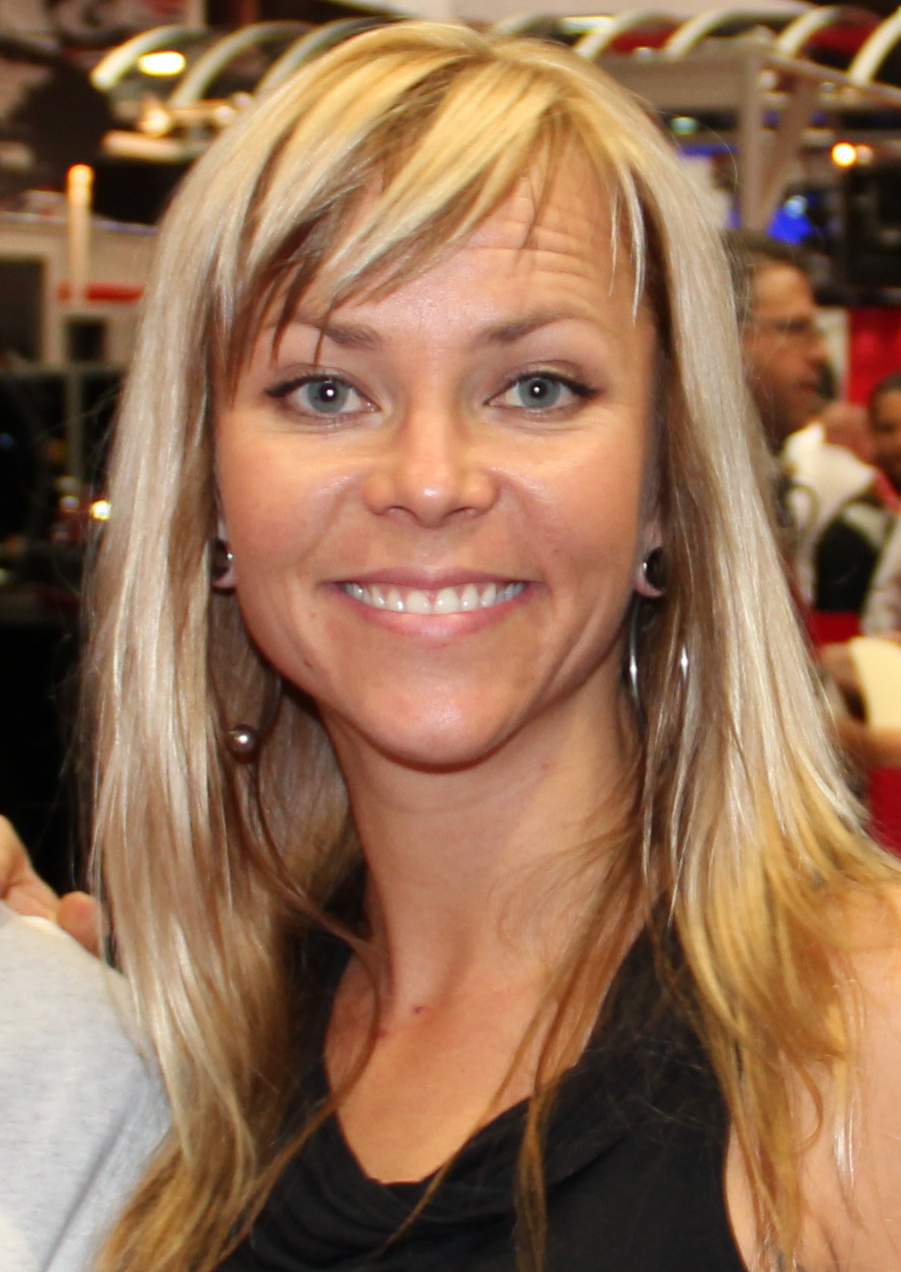
- Combs in 2012
- Born: July 27, 1980; Rockerville, South Dakota, U.S.
- Died: August 27, 2019 (aged 39); Alvord Desert, Oregon, U.S.
- Education: Wyoming Technical Institute
- Occupations: Racer; metal fabricator; television personality

Jessica Combs (July 27, 1980 – August 27, 2019) was an American professional racer, television personality, and metal fabricator. She set a women's land speed class record (four wheels) in 2013 and broke her own record in 2016. She was known as "the fastest woman on four wheels".

Combs co-hosted the Spike TV show Xtreme 4x4 for more than 90 episodes from 2005 to 2009. Other television shows on which she appeared include Overhaulin', MythBusters, The List: 1001 Car Things to Do Before You Die, All Girls Garage, and Science Channel's How to Build... Everything in 2016.

Combs died after crashing a jet-powered high-speed race car at the Alvord Desert in southeastern Oregon while attempting to beat her four-wheel land speed record. She was posthumously awarded the female land-speed world record by Guinness World Records in June 2020.

== Early life and education ==
Combs was born in Rockerville, South Dakota, on July 27, 1980, the daughter of Jamie Combs and Nina Darrington. The family moved to Piedmont, South Dakota, when she was two years old. She had two siblings, Kelly Combs and Danielle Theis, and three step-siblings, Rebekah Hall, Arielle Hall, and Austin Darrington. Combs' great-grandmother was Nina DeBow, a jazz pianist who raced Stanley Steamers.

Combs graduated from Stevens High School in 1998. Combs graduated from WyoTech in 2004, where she attended the Collision and Refinishing Core Program, the Street Rod Fabrication and Custom Fabrication, and High-Performance Powertrain programs. Following her graduation, Combs' first professional job came after the WyoTech marketing department hired her and another student to build a car from the ground up in six months to debut at the Specialty Equipment Marketing Association's show.

== Career ==
=== Racing ===
As a professional driver, Combs raced in a range of events and enjoyed many successes.

- 2011 – SCORE Baja 1000 – 2nd – Class 10
- 2013 – Set women's land speed record – 398 mph with a top speed of 440 mph
- 2014 – Ultra 4 Stampede – 1st – Legends Class
- 2014 – Ultra 4 Glen Helen Grand Prix – 2nd – Spec Class
- 2014 – Ultra 4 American Rock Sports Challenge – 3rd – Spec Class
- 2014 – Ultra 4 Western Region Series – 1st – Spec Class
- 2014 – Ultra 4 National Championship – 1st – Spec Class
- 2014 – Ultra 4 King of the Hammers – 1st – Spec Class
- 2015 – SCORE Baja 1000 – 2nd – Class 7
- 2015 – Rallye Aicha des Gazelles (off-road rally race) – 1st – First Participation – 10th overall
- 2016 – Ultra 4 King of the Hammers – 1st – EMC Modified Class
- 2017 – Ultra 4 King of the Hammers – 12th – 4400 Class

On October 9, 2013, Combs drove the North American Eagle Supersonic Speed Challenger at the Alvord desert, claiming the women's four-wheel land speed record with an official run of 398.954 mph (632 km/h) and a top speed of 440.709 mph (709 km/h). In doing so, she broke the 48-year-old women's land speed record, a 308.506 mph (496.492 km/h) run average set by Lee Breedlove in Spirit of America - Sonic 1 in 1965. On September 7, 2016, Combs set a new top speed of 477.59 mph (768.61 km/h) driving the other American Eagle.

Combs was also a 2014 Ultra 4 Spec Class National Champion with Falken Tire. In 2016, she took first place in King of the Hammers with the Savvy Off Road team in the EMC Modified Class and a 2017 12th-place finish in the Unlimited Class driving the same Stock Mod car.

=== Television ===
Combs hosted the SpikeTV television show Xtreme 4x4, a part of the Powerblock, for four years. Following an on-set accident, Combs announced in February 2008 that she would leave the show.

In 2009, Combs appeared in 12 episodes of the seventh season of MythBusters while Kari Byron was on maternity leave. She also appeared on Overhaulin'.

Starting in 2011, Combs hosted the Autoblog series The List: 1001 Car Things To Do Before You Die alongside co-host Patrick McIntyre.

From 2011 to 2014, Combs served as one of the hosts of All Girls Garage on Velocity (now Motor Trend network). The basis of the show was women repairing and upgrading new and classic automobiles.

In 2012, Combs became a co-host with Chris Jacobs for the sixth season of Overhaulin's relaunch on the Velocity and Discovery channels.

In 2018, Combs appeared on the Discovery Channel panel show Break Room.

Also in 2018, Combs appeared on an episode of Jay Leno's Garage as Jay Leno's guest driver of a Bugatti Chiron.

Released in 2022, The Fastest Woman on Earth details Combs' career and land speed record attempt, filmed for seven years, beginning in 2013.

== Death ==
Combs died on August 27, 2019, after crashing a jet-powered car while setting a land-speed record as part of the North American Eagle Project on a dry lake bed in the Alvord Desert, Oregon. The crash was caused by a failure of a front wheel, likely caused by hitting an object in the desert, which caused the front wheel assembly to collapse at a speed nearing 523 mph (842 km/h). The official cause of death was determined to be "blunt-force trauma to the head" occurring prior to the fire that engulfed the race vehicle after the crash.

Combs' final run across Oregon's Alvord Desert on August 27 reached 522.783 mph (841.338 km/h), before her crash, which broke the existing women's land speed record of 512.71 mph (825.13 km/h), set in 1976 by Kitty O'Neil at the same location. This record was verified by Guinness World Records in June 2020.
