= North American Eagle Project =

Land speed record attempt

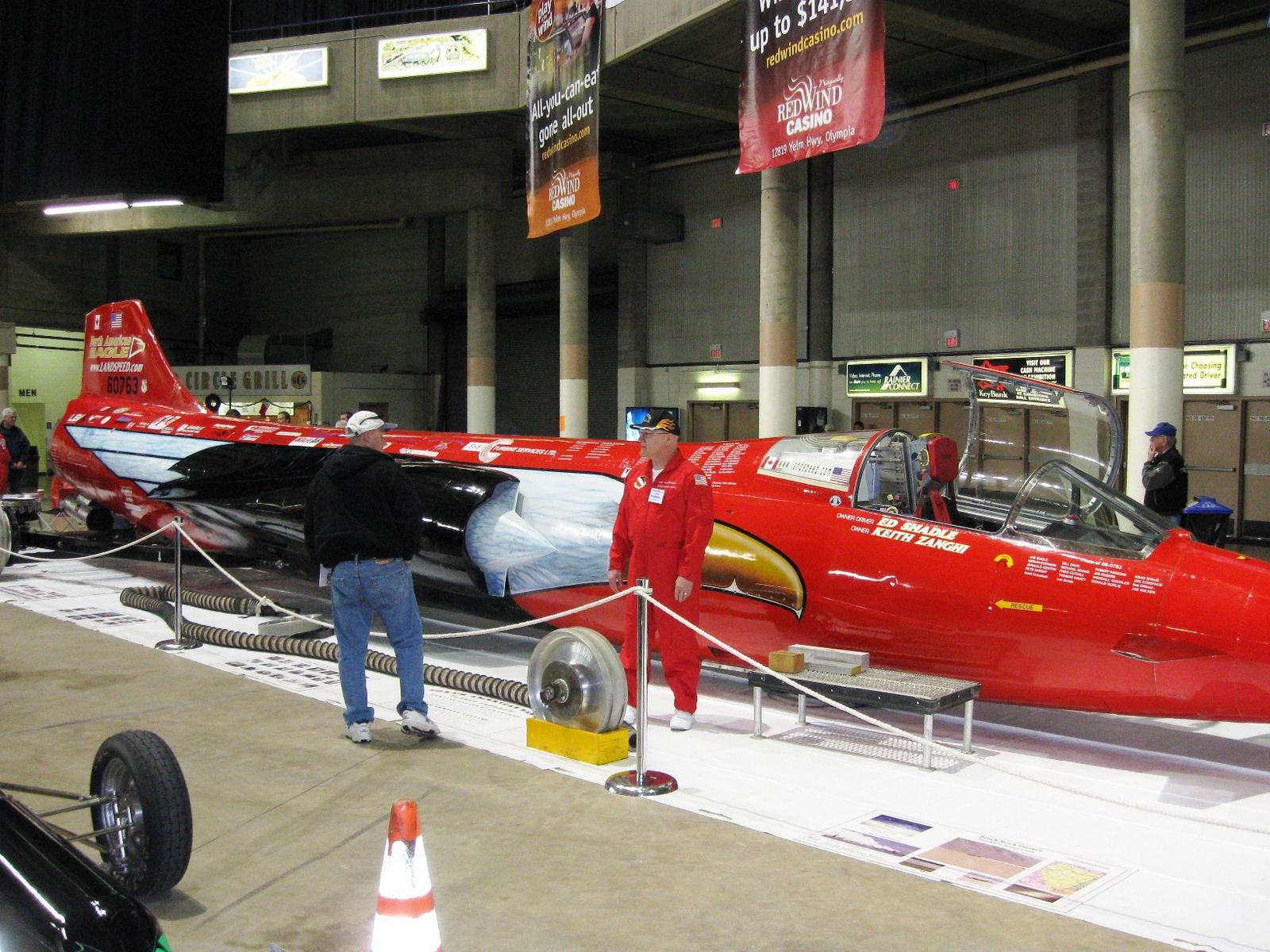
The land speed record attempt vehicle

The North American Eagle Project was a jet powered car that was intended to challenge the 763 mph (1,228 km/h) (Mach 1.02) land speed record set by the ThrustSSC in 1997. The venture was a collaboration between Canadian and US engineers, pilots, and mechanics. In 2013, they had hoped to reach 800 mph (1,287 km/h), or Mach 1.058.

In a land speed record attempt on August 27, 2019, the North American Eagle crashed, killing driver Jessi Combs. During the run, Combs did set a new world land-speed record for a woman, at 522.783 mph (841.338 km/h). Since the crash, the project has been abandoned.

== Description ==
The vehicle was based on the fuselage of a Lockheed F-104A-10 Starfighter jet fighter aircraft, tail number 56-0763, The aircraft was built for the United States Air Force and assigned to the Air Force Flight Test Center at Edwards Air Force Base from August 29, 1957 until 1970 when it was retired. Initially the aircraft was used as a GE test platform for the J79 engine. It was later used as a chase plane for the North American X-15, Lockheed SR-71 Blackbird and North American XB-70 Valkyrie test programs. It was flown by Joe Walker, Scott Crossfield, Pete Knight, Bill Dana, Chuck Yeager, Joe Engle and Bob Gilliland among other notable pilots. North American Eagle designed road suspension and carried out the necessary systems integration for it. The vehicle was 56 feet (17.1 m) long and weighed 13,000 pounds (5,900 kg).

=== Powerplant ===
The engine was a General Electric LM1500 turbojet (a civilian variation of the aircraft's original J79). A stock engine for low speed testing is rated at 42,500 hp (31.7 MW). The vehicle had an enhanced engine for record attempts, rated at 52,000 hp (52,700 metric horsepower). At idle the stock engine consumes 40 US gallons (151 L; 33 imp gal) of fuel per minute, rising to 80 US gallons (303 L; 67 imp gal) per minute at 100% military power and 90 US gallons (341 L; 75 imp gal) per minute in afterburner mode.

=== Braking systems ===
As of 2014, four methods were in use to decelerate the vehicle. It had high-speed air brakes which were original equipment on the F-104, high-speed drogue parachutes to be deployed at 700 mph (1,100 km/h), and low-speed drogue parachutes for deployment below 350 mph (560 km/h). The vehicle also had an anti-skid neodymium rare-earth magnet eddy-current brake. The vehicle failing to stop has been suggested as a factor in the crash of the North American Eagle in an August 2019 land-speed record run.

== Runs ==
Fourteen engine test runs were conducted on a test stand, the first in June 2004, with the last two using full afterburner. In December 2004, the first test runs of the vehicle were performed. A total of 23 test runs were completed with the vehicle between March 2006 and June 2008. Speeds as high as 400 miles per hour (640 km/h) were claimed but not verified by outside official automobile speed record authorities. Testing in the US was conducted at Sanderson Field in Shelton, Washington; Toledo Airport in southwest Washington state; Edwards AFB, California; El Mirage Dry Lake, California; and Black Rock Desert, Nevada.

On October 9, 2013, Jessi Combs drove the North American Eagle (NaE) Supersonic Speed Challenger at the Alvord Desert, claiming the women's 4-wheel land speed record with an official run of 398.954 mph (632 km/h) and a top speed of 440.709 mph (709 km/h). In doing so, she broke the 48-year-old women's land speed record, a 308.506 mph (496.492 km/h) run average set by Lee Breedlove in Spirit of America - Sonic 1 in 1965. On September 7, 2016, Combs set a new top speed of 477.59 mph (768.61 km/h) driving the Other American Eagle.

== Fatal crash ==
On August 27, 2019, the North American Eagle crashed during a land speed record attempt, killing driver Jessi Combs. Reports indicate that the car failed to stop and traveled beyond the edge of the lake bed.

Investigation into the cause of the crash was reported in November 2019. The investigation revealed that the front wheel assembly of the car collapsed, likely due to collision damage from hitting something on the track.

In late June 2020, the Guinness Book of Records reclassified the August 27, 2019 speed runs as meeting its requirements, and Combs was credited with the record at 522.783 mph (841.338 km/h), noting she was the first in nearly 46 years to break the record, surpassing the record set by Kitty O'Neil in December 1973.

== See also ==
- List of vehicle speed records
- Bloodhound LSR
