= General Electric J79 =

Axial flow turbojet engine

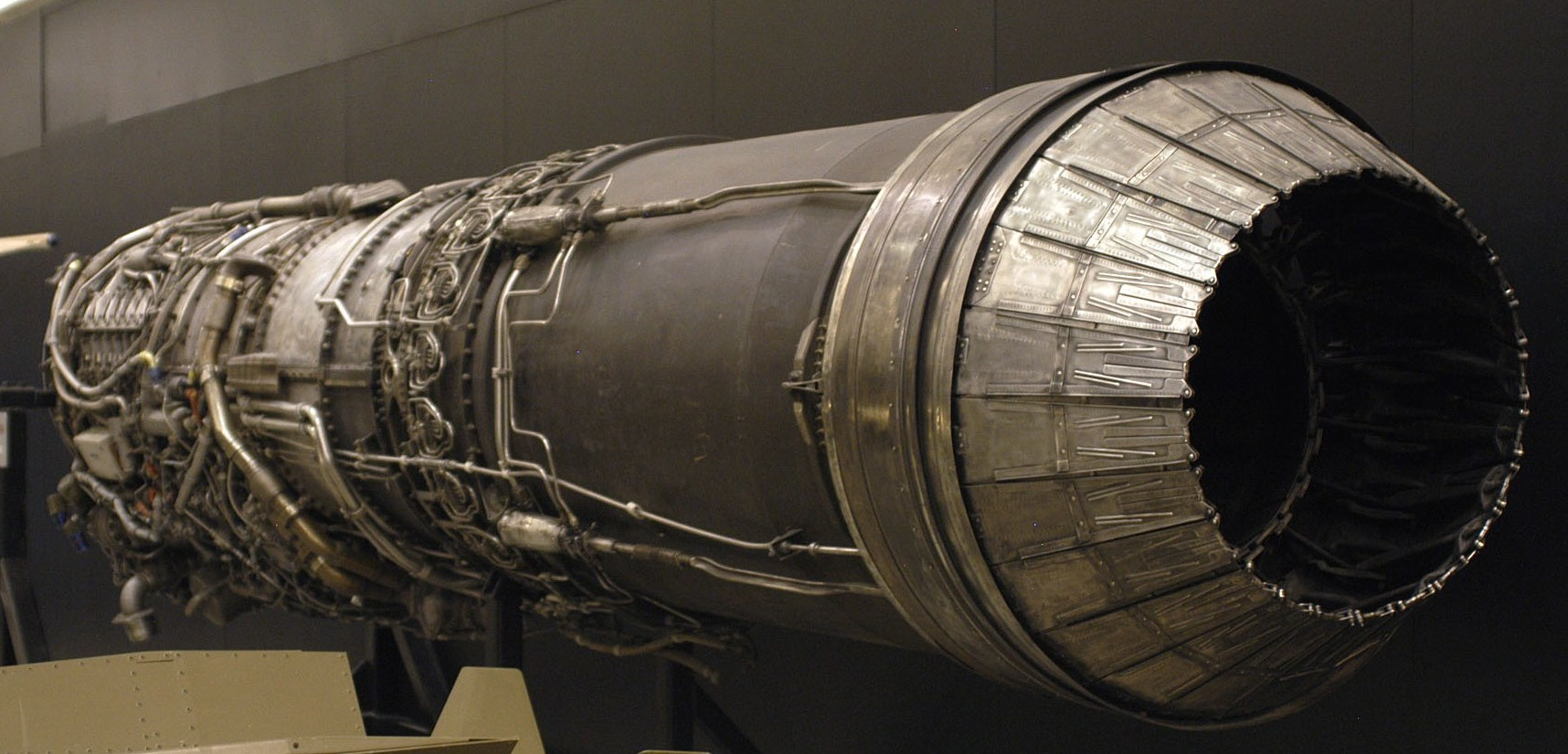
- J79 on display at the National Museum of the United States Air Force
- Type: Afterburning turbojet
- National origin: United States
- Manufacturer: General Electric Aircraft Engines
- First run: 20 May 1955 (first flight)
- Major applications: Convair B-58 Hustler; IAI Kfir; Lockheed F-104 Starfighter; McDonnell Douglas F-4 Phantom II; North American A-5 Vigilante
- Number built: >17,000
- Developed from: General Electric J73
- Developed into: General Electric CJ805

The General Electric J79 is an axial-flow turbojet engine built for use in a variety of fighter and bomber aircraft and a supersonic cruise missile. The J79 was produced by General Electric Aircraft Engines in the United States, and under license by several other companies worldwide. Among its major uses was the Lockheed F-104 Starfighter, Convair B-58 Hustler, McDonnell Douglas F-4 Phantom II, North American A-5 Vigilante and IAI Kfir.

A commercial version, designated the CJ805, powered the Convair 880, while an aft-turbofan derivative, the CJ805-23, powered the Convair 990 airliners and a single Sud Aviation Caravelle intended to demonstrate to the U.S. market the benefits of a bypass engine over the existing Rolls-Royce Avon turbojet.

In 1959 the gas generator of the J79 was developed as a stationary 10 MW-class (13,000 bhp) free-turbine turboshaft engine for naval power, power generation, and industrial use, called the LM1500. Its first application was in the research hydrofoil USS Plainview.

== Development ==
=== Evolution of the variable stator compressor ===
By the late 1940s, jet engine design had progressed to the point where further progress was limited by the performance of its compressor, in particular the pressure ratio of the compressor had to be increased to reduce the engine fuel consumption. However, the useful operating range of the compressor was limited at that time and centered around its design condition which is at a high compressor speed for take-off or cruise. If designed for high efficiency at high speeds it was very inefficient and prone to stall at low speeds.

In 1944 the National Advisory Committee for Aeronautics had tested a theory for "Extending the useful operating range of axial-flow compressors by use of adjustable stator blades" by running an eight-stage axial compressor with pressure ratio 3.42:1 and adjustable blade angles. Considerable improvement in efficiencies were obtained at compressor speeds appreciably below the design speed.

Departures of velocity from the design condition are most noticeable in the first stages at low rpm and become more so as the design pressure ratio is increased leading to blade stall and compressor surging as happened with the Rolls-Royce Avon compressor, with design pressure ratio of 6.3:1 in 1949. In 1947, Geoff Wilde, a Rolls-Royce compressor designer, had applied for a patent "Axial flow compressor regulation" "to provide a compressor with a wide speed-range of operation". An experimental 12-stage compressor was built with the inlet guide vanes and first four rows of stator blades adjustable to lower the air incidence angles while running at low speed. It was very effective in overcoming the stall and surge. However, a simpler mechanical-design solution (variable inlet guide vanes and bleed) had already been shown to work with the required design pressure ratio so variable stators were not used in a Rolls-Royce engine until the 1980s (IAE V2500).

By 1950 General Electric was focusing on supersonic engines with variable stators as a result of design studies which compared them with dual-rotor types. Based on their past experience at that time, and estimation of the development effort required to prove new technologies, variable stators promised the best way of designing the compressor for the high required pressure ratio of 12:1. This pressure ratio was needed to achieve the supersonic performance, subsonic cruise performance and low weight necessary for future supersonic aircraft.

In 1951, a General Electric team led by Gerhard Neumann, at that time in charge of engine development testing, was given funding to build a test compressor with variable stators. In addition, the Aircraft Gas Turbine Division lead, C.W. 'Jim' LaPierre, formed two teams to do design studies for an engine that could run for extended periods at Mach 2.0 while still giving good fuel economy while cruising at Mach 0.9. Neumann led a team using a variable stator configuration, while Chapman Walker led a parallel effort using two-spools. After a years study the engine with variable stators was chosen as it was lighter, simpler and had a smaller diameter. A demonstrator engine with variable stators, the GOL-1590, predecessor to the J79 was built. At the same time a new engine, the X-24A, was designed for a supersonic aircraft and selected by the Air Force. Development of the new engine was supported by running the GOL-1590 demonstrator engine.

=== General ===
GE won the Air Force contract for a new engine with approximately 14,000 pounds-force (62,000 N), with afterburning, to power a new supersonic bomber, which became the Convair B-58 Hustler. The two other engines offered by GE, an advanced version of the existing J73 and a much larger design, known as the J77, were both cancelled. The first prototype of the production version, XJ-79, ran on 8 June 1954.

The first flight of the engine was on 20 May 1955 with the engine installed in a General Electric J47-powered North American B-45C Tornado (serial 48-009). In flight the J79 was lowered from the bomb bay into the airstream for testing. The first flight after the 50-hour qualification test, required for a new engine that is the sole source of thrust for a flying testbed, was on 8 December 1955, powering the second pre-production Douglas F4D Skyray, with the J79 in place of its original Westinghouse J40 engine as part of the General Electric development and qualification program. The YF-104 was the next airplane to fly with the J79 followed by a re-engined Grumman F11F Tiger in a Navy-sponsored program to gain experience with the engine before the first flight of the F4H (F-4).

The J79 was used on the F-104 Starfighter, B-58 Hustler, F-4 Phantom II, A-5 Vigilante, IAI Kfir aircraft and the SSM-N-9 Regulus II supersonic cruise missile. It was produced for more than 30 years. Over 17,000 J79s were built in the US, and under license in Belgium, Canada, Germany, Israel, Italy, and Japan. A downgraded version of the General Dynamics F-16 Fighting Falcon with a J79 was proposed as a low-cost fighter for export, and though a prototype aircraft was flown, it found no customers.

The J79 was replaced by the late 1960s in new fighter designs by afterburning turbofans such as the Pratt & Whitney TF30 used in the F-111 and F-14, and newer generation turbofans with the Pratt & Whitney F100 used in the F-15 Eagle which give better cruise fuel efficiency by-passing air around the core of the engine.

For their part in designing the J79, Gerhard Neumann and Neil Burgess of General Electric Aircraft Engines were jointly awarded the Collier Trophy in 1958, also sharing the honor with Clarence Johnson (Lockheed F-104) and the US Air Force (Flight Records).

== Design ==
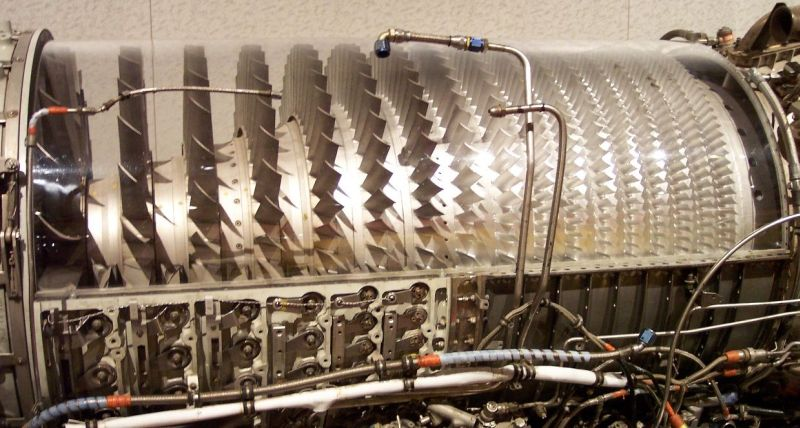
Sectioned compressor stage of a J79

The compressor blades and vanes are made of 403 stainless steel, except for the -3B and -7A variants, which have A286 vanes at stages 7 through 17. The compressor rotor is made of Lapelloy, B5F5 and titanium. The J79 makes a particular howling sound at certain throttle settings. This strange feature led to the NASA operated F-104B Starfighter, N819NA, being named Howling Howland. Early engines also produced noticeable quantities of smoke, especially at mid-throttle/cruise settings, a disadvantage in combat aircraft making them vulnerable to visual detection. Later models were redesigned to be "smokeless".

The turboshaft counterpart to the J79 is the General Electric LM1500, used for land and marine applications. Many J79-derived engines have found uses as gas turbine power generators in remote locations, in applications such as powering pipelines.

The J79 has two commercial derivatives: CJ805-3 (a non-afterburning engine, fitted with thrust reverser and sound suppressor), and the CJ805-23 (with a free-wheeling aft fan and thrust reverser) fitted to the Convair CV-880 and the Convair CV-990 respectively.

J79 engines may be started using compressed air directly on the engine turbine blades or by using a turbine starter attached to the accessory gearbox. The gas used in this starter is either compressed air or from a solid propellant cartridge.

== Variants ==
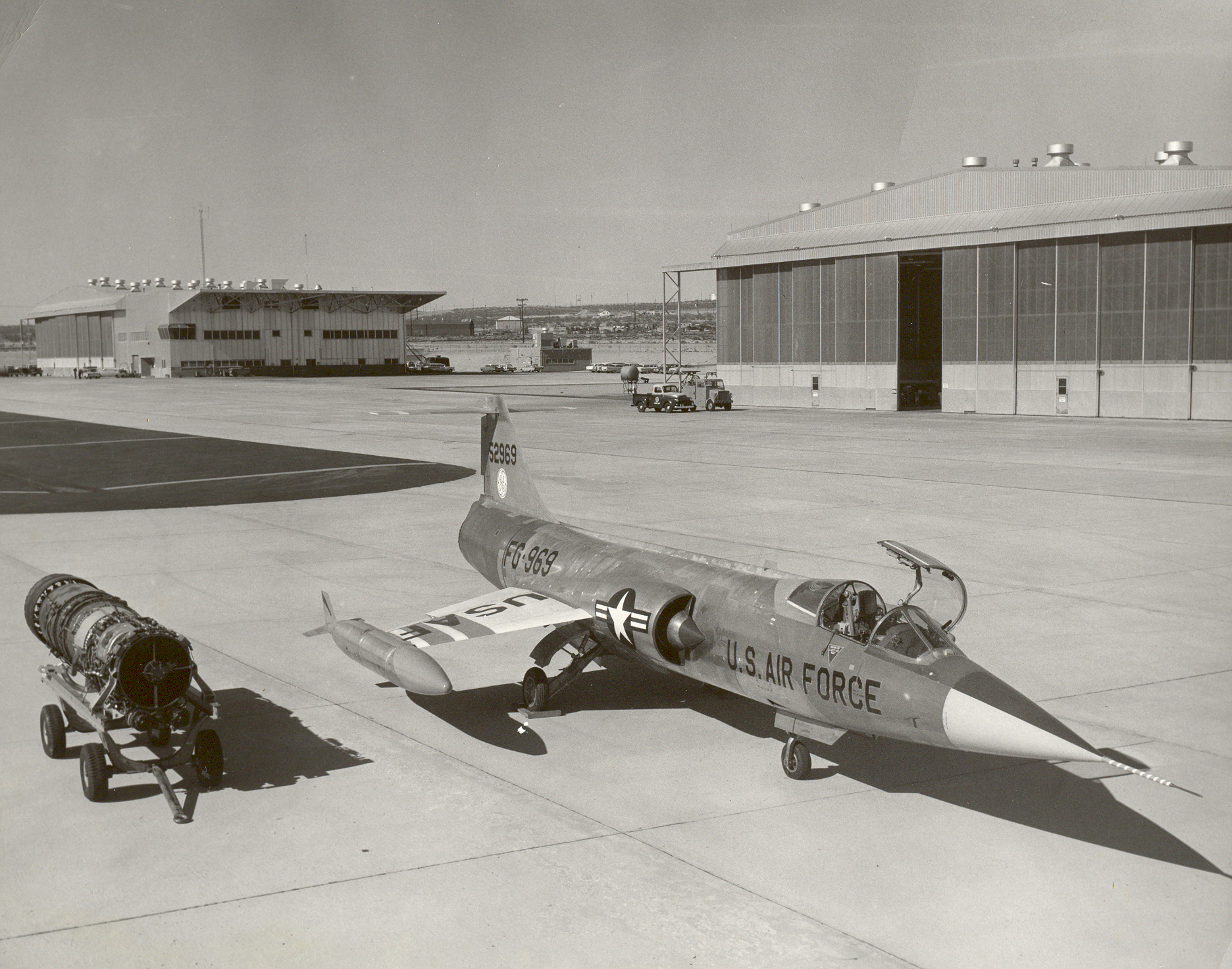
GE-J79-3 and Lockheed YF-104A Starfighter

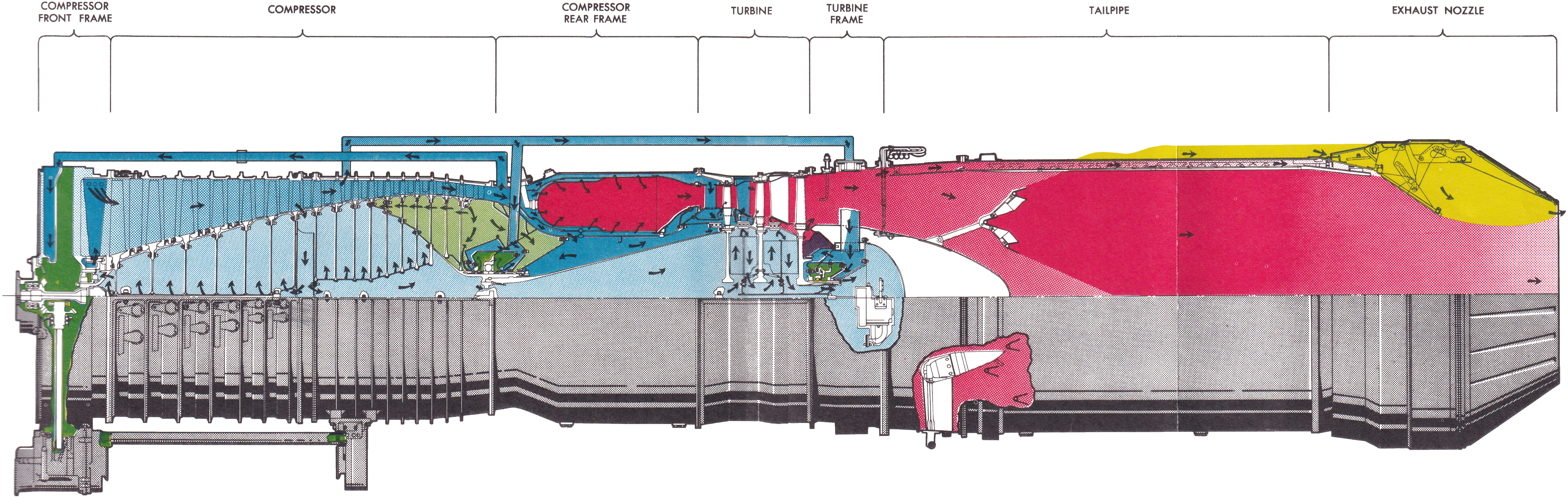
Cutaway of a J79-GE-3B showing airflow.

Thrust given in Pound-force (lbf) and kilonewtons (kN).

XJ79-GE-1
Prototype. First ground static test run on 8 June 1954 produced 14,350 lbf (64 kN) with afterburner.
YJ79-GE-1
Flight test engines were designated YJ79-GE-1.
J79-GE-2
Powered the McDonnell F4H-1 Phantom (F-4A), 16,100 lbf (72 kN) of afterburner thrust.
J79-GE-2A
Essentially similar to the -2
J79-GE-3
Used in the YF-104A, F-104A and the Grumman F11F-1F Super Tiger
J79-GE-3A
YF-104A, F-104A and F-104B.
J79-GE-3B
F-104A and F-104B.
J79-GE-5A
Convair B-58 Hustler 15,600 lbf (69 kN) with afterburner.
J79-GE-5B
Convair B-58 Hustler 15,600 lbf (69 kN) with afterburner.
J79-GE-5C
J79-GE-7
F-104C, F-104D and F-104F.
J79-GE-7A
F-104C, F-104D and F-104F.

J79-OEL-7
Licensed production GE-7 manufactured by Orenda Engines to power the Canadair CF-104.

J79-GE-8
North American A-5 Vigilante and F4H-1 (F-4B) with 16,950 lbf (75 kN) of afterburner thrust
J79-GE-8A
Sub-variant of the -8
J79-GE-8B
Sub-variant of the -8
J79-GE-10
F-4J, 17,900 lbf (80 kN) of afterburner thrust.
J79-GE-10B
F-4S Phantom II and British F-4J(UK) Phantom II F.3, lower smoke signature
J79-GE-11
J79-GE-11A
German F-104G and TF-104G. Pakistani Griffin F-104A and F-104B. 15,600 lbf (69 kN) with afterburner. Many -11 engines were licensed manufactured in Europe as part of the large F-104 consortium production programme, Alfa Romeo, Fiat and Fabrique Nationale being the main suppliers for the project.

J79-IHI-11A
Licensed production GE-11A, built in Japan by Ishikawajima-Harima Heavy Industries Co., Ltd to power their similarly licensed built F-104J and F-104DJ Starfighters.
J79-MTU-J1K
Licensed built and improved version of the GE-11A manufactured by MTU Aero Engines in Germany.

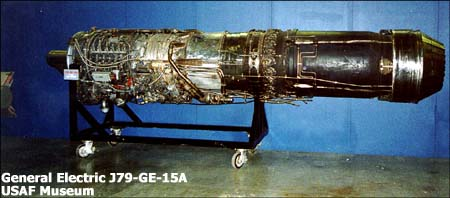
J79-15A at the USAF Museum

J79-GE-15
F-4C, RF-4C, F-4D; with 17,000 lbf (75.6kN) of afterburner thrust.
J79-GE-17
F-4E, RF-4E, F-4EJ, F-4F, F-4G; with 17,900 lbf (80 kN) of afterburner thrust.
J79-GE-19
Aeritalia F-104S; also retrofitted to F-104As of the 319th FIS.
J79-GE-J1E
License-built in Israel by Beit Shemesh Engines Ltd. (BSEL) with 18,750 lbf (83 kN) afterburning thrust for the IAI Kfir.
J79-GE-119
F-16/79

== Applications ==
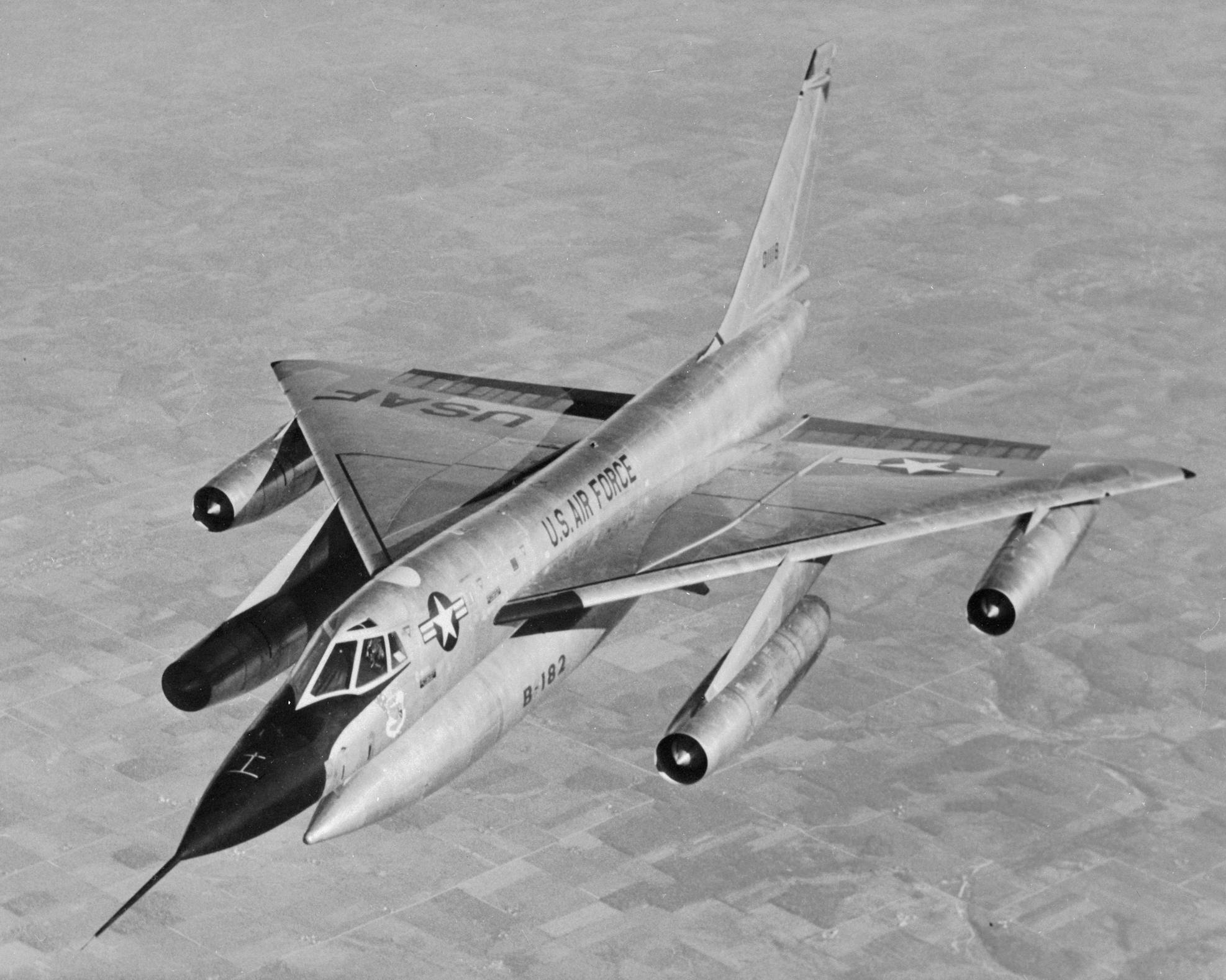
J79 powered Convair B-58 Hustler

Aircraft

- Convair B-58 Hustler
- General Dynamics F-16/79
- Grumman F11F-1F Super Tiger
- IAI Kfir
- Lockheed F-104 Starfighter
- McDonnell Douglas F-4 Phantom II
- North American A-5 Vigilante
- Northrop X-21
- SSM-N-9/RGM-15 Regulus II

Land speed record cars

- Art Arfons' "Green Monster"
- Craig Breedlove's "Spirit of America - Sonic 1"
- Craig Breedlove's "Spirit of America – Formula Shell LSRV"
- North American Eagle Project

== Specifications (J79-GE-17) ==
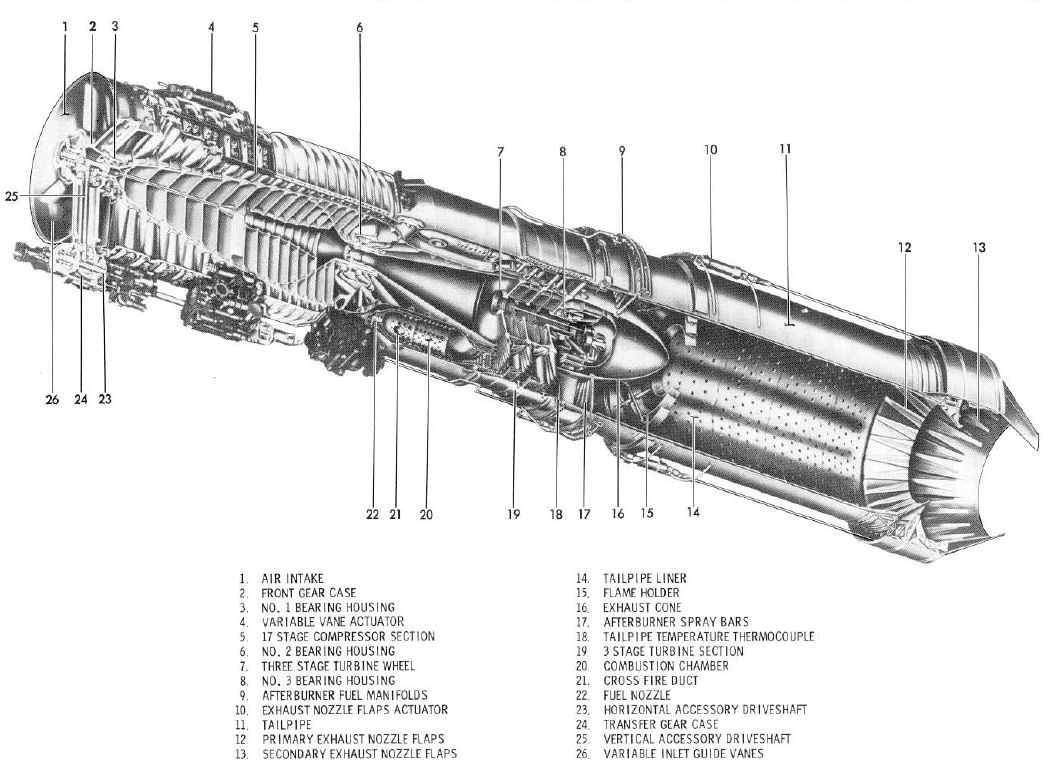
J79 with components labeled

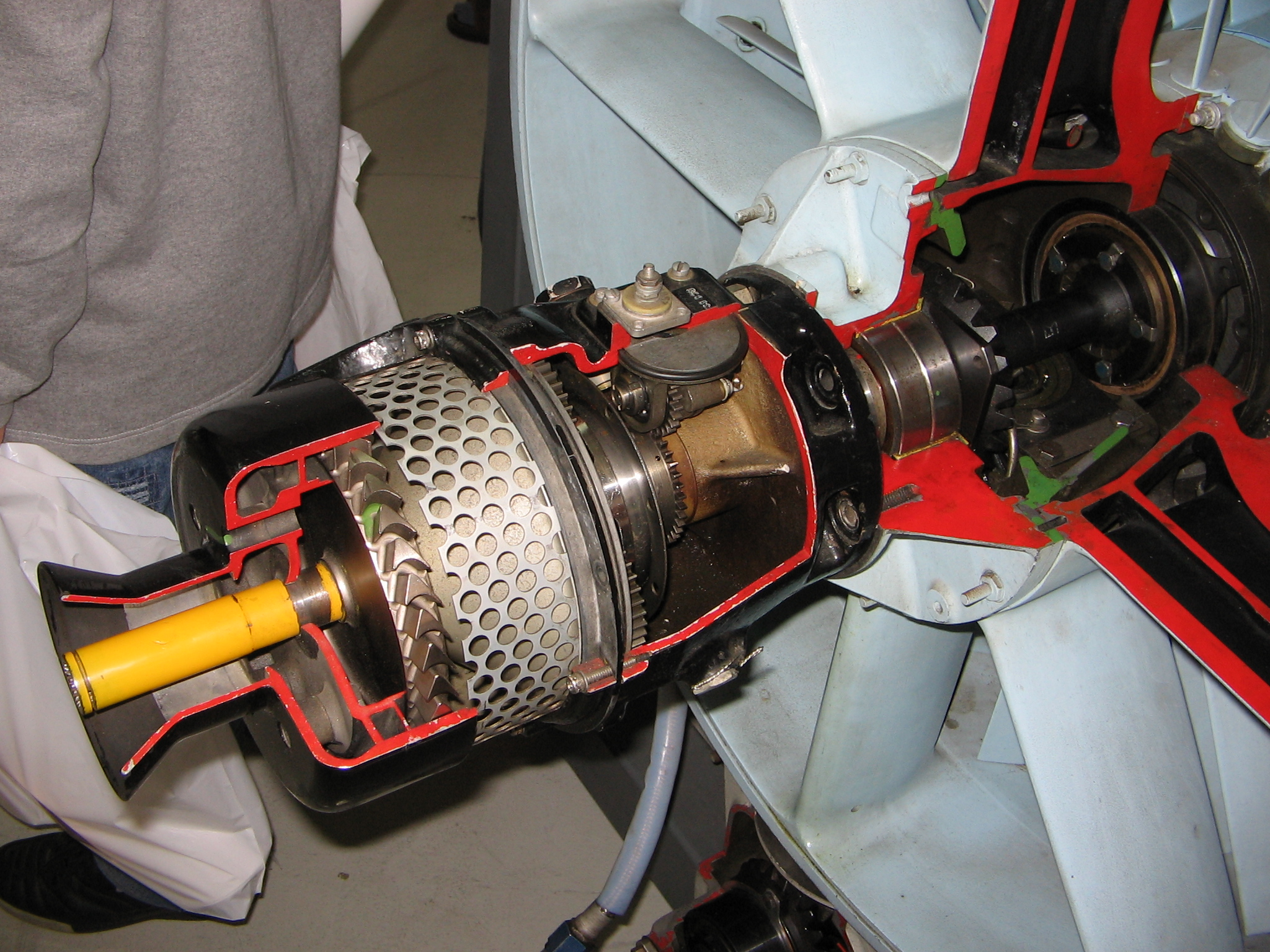
Cutaway view of an air-start motor of a General Electric J79 turbojet

Data from Jane's All The World's Aircraft, J79 - Turbine Engines: A Closer Look

==== General characteristics ====
- Type: Afterburning turbojet engine
- Length: 208.69 in (5.301 m)
- Diameter: 39.06 in (0.992 m)
- Dry weight: 3,835 lb (1,740 kg)

==== Components ====
- Compressor: single-spool 17-stage axial compressor, with one row of variable inlet guide vanes (VIGV's) followed by 6 rows of variable stator vanes
- Combustors: cannular
- Turbine: 3-stage
- Fuel type: JP-4, JP-5

==== Performance ====
- Maximum thrust: 11,870 lbf (52.8 kN) dry; 17,900 lbf (80 kN) with afterburner
- Overall pressure ratio: 13.5:1
- Air mass flow: 170 lb/s (77 kg/s)
- Turbine inlet temperature: 1,710 °F (930 °C; 1,210 K)
- Specific fuel consumption: 1.965 lb/(lbf⋅h) or 55.7 g/(kN⋅s) with afterburner, 0.84 lb/(lbf⋅h) or 24 g/(kN⋅s) at military thrust
- Thrust-to-weight ratio: 3.1 dry / 4.7 with afterburner

== See also ==
- North American Eagle Project
- United States military aircraft engine designations

Related development

- General Electric J47
- General Electric J73
- General Electric CJ805
- General Electric YJ93
- General Electric LM1500

Comparable engines

- Lyulka AL-21

Related lists

- List of aircraft engines
