= Courtney Hansen =

American television personality

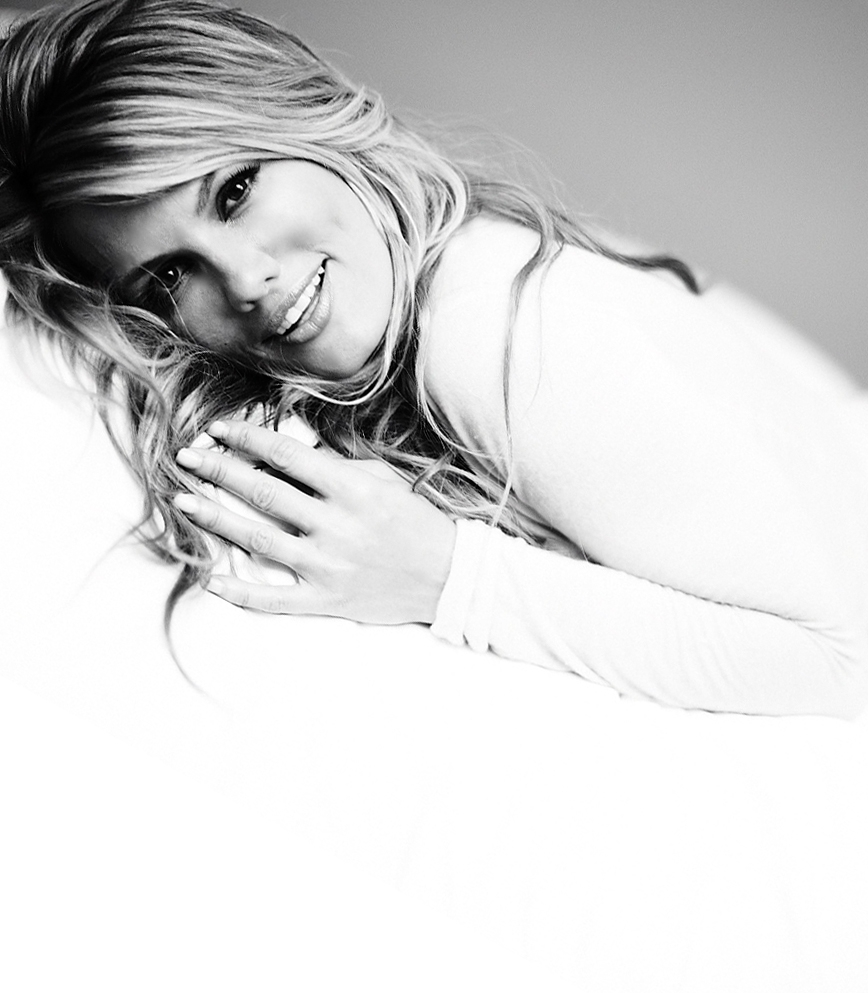
- Born: Courtney Jane Hansen; 2 October 1974 (age 51); Minneapolis, Minnesota, U.S.
- Education: Florida State University
- Height: 5 ft 9 in (1.75 m)
- Spouses: Ilya Sapritsky (m. 2009; div. 2014) Jay Hartington (m. 2018)
- Children: 1
- Website: Courtney Hansen

Courtney Hansen (born October 2, 1974) is an American television host/personality, syndicated columnist, published author, and former fashion model.

== Biography ==
Hansen was born on October 2, 1974, in Minneapolis, Minnesota, to Gerald John "Jerry" and Constance (Walker) Hansen. Her father is a winner of 27 SCCA national racing championships. From 1973 to 2006 her family owned Brainerd International Raceway and she grew up in Orono, Minnesota, and spent much time around the pits and garages at racing tracks. As a result, she is an automobile enthusiast, and much of her work to date has revolved around automobiles. Hansen married Jay Hartington, her longtime boyfriend and father of her child, on July 21, 2018, in Taormina, Italy.

== Career ==
After graduating with a degree in marketing from Florida State University, she undertook a corporate job in marketing. After leaving the corporate world, Hansen hosted the Jack Nicklaus pilot Killer Golf and segments on the Travel Channel, worked as a fashion and fitness model, and was on the cover of Hot Rod Magazine, Muscle & Fitness and other major magazines.

Hansen's first major TV role was co-host of the car makeover series Overhaulin'. She went on to host Spike TV's Powerblock, which was composed of four half-hour automotive shows, for eight seasons. She hosted a special for Spike TV called Great Builds, and was host of the travel adventure series "Destination Wild" for Fox Sports Networks, which won a Telly Award. In the past she hosted for TLC's automotive-themed shows Rides, and Million Dollar Motors. Hansen has been a spokesmodel for Matco Tools, Dodge, and Rolls-Royce.

Additionally, Hansen wrote a column for FHM, and has written a nationally syndicated automotive newspaper column titled Courtney Hansen: Full Throttle since 2005. She is the published author of The Garage Girl's Guide To Everything You Need To Know About Your Car (ISBN 1581825196), a book offering women and first time car buyers advice on how to care for their cars.

Hansen hosted Autoweek's Vinsetta Garage for Discovery Channel's Velocity network. The show was named after Vinsetta Garage, a century-old Detroit landmark that Autoweek Magazine saved from demolition. The garage serviced everything from carriages to Ford Model Ts to Chevrolet Corvettes.

In January 2014, Hansen started duties as host of the new NBC Sports, Spike TV, and CBS Sports TV series PowerNation.

In 2022, Hansen began hosting Ride of Your Life With Courtney Hansen, a show on MotorTrend TV where she and the other custom car builders of the Marietta, Georgia, Royl Garage, which is owned by her, repair, customize, and restore cars for people facing adverse life experiences or have had tragedies.
