= Stacey David =

American television personality

- Born: Stacey David; January 11, 1963 (age 63); Idaho, U.S.
- Education: Boise State University (dropped out)
- Occupations: Television host; author; public speaker
- Years active: 1990s–present
- Known for: Trucks! (1999-2005); GearZ (2007-); Catchphrase "What are you working on?"
- Spouse: Kathryn
- Website: staceydavid.com

Stacey David is the host of the TV series GearZ on Racer Network and Motor Trend (TV network). He has worked on numerous vehicle modification and repair projects. Many of these projects are unique in terms of the final results.

The types of vehicles David works on range from off-road four wheel drives to hot rod street trucks to around the woods all-terrain vehicles—or just about anything else that has an engine and some way to steer it.

== Early life and education ==
Stacey David was born on January 11, 1963 and raised in Idaho. He earned his reputation in the hot rod club driving a 1930 5-window Coupe to school every day. David has had a fascination for motor vehicles for as long as he can remember.

By installing 440cc snowmobile engines, he was able to make his go-karts lightning fast even before he was a teenager. At the age of twelve, he did his first restoration: his sister's 1963 Volkswagen Beetle. His father's flat fender Willys Jeep started his passion for Four Wheel Drive and off-roading.

During his college days at Boise State University, he spent the time that would have otherwise been spent in a "boring" Biology class learning how to race at the local tracks. While there, he absorbed everything he could about racing legends such as Richard Petty, Don Garlits, and Carroll Shelby. David's desire to own and drive a unique vehicle led him to the best way (in his opinion) to achieve this goal - to build it himself. To fulfill that goal, he became a student of legendary hot-rodders (custom car builders) George Barris, John Buttera and Darryl Starbird.

== Career ==
David moved to Nashville in 1984 to pursue a career in music. During his time as a musician, he gained attention for showing up to gigs in his hot rod creations. Around 1993, he opened his own custom car shop called "The Rattletrap". He continued to build his reputation by working on whatever was pushed, pulled, or dragged into his shop. The services that Rattletrap offered included engine building, custom paint, fabrication, suspension work, and more.

David's career took a turn to television when, in the late 1990s, he was offered a position to host the TV series Trucks!. Eager to seize the opportunity, David joined Mel Fair to host the show beginning in its 1999 season. In 2000, however, Fair left the show and David remained the only host.

During the eight years he hosted Trucks!, the show became one of the highest rated on Spike TV's weekend lineup. This was partially because David both designed and built his own projects, unlike many other shows that aired during the same period. Trucks! maintained the highest viewership of any automotive how-to television show throughout the years David hosted it.

David continued to host and produce the show until the end of the 2005 season, when he chose to pursue, in his own words, "other opportunities". On March 31, 2007—and a bit before that for his loyal fan base—the meaning of "other opportunities" was revealed as a new show called Stacey David’s GearZ, airing on ESPN2.

Season two of GearZ moved to the Speed Channel, with the first episode premiering February 23, 2008. GearZ remained on Speed for six seasons.

Season eight of GearZ moved to MavTV, with the first episode premiering March 7, 2014. Season nine was also syndicated on Velocity (TV network) with Season 11 premiering in January 2017. David believes that the sustained popularity of GearZ is owed to the fact that the show is "about all things mechanical, not just cars or trucks". He also credits authenticity for the show's long-term success, stating that "we never went the way of the 'reality show' full of jackassery and fake timelines."

Stacey David has now been on the air for over 25 years, sharing his custom hot rods all over the world in places including Canada, Russia, Mexico, England, France, and more.

== Personal life ==
David is a Christian. In his spare time, he remains involved in the Nashville music scene. He also enjoys outdoor activities such as hiking.
