= Uniondale, New York =

- Hamlet and census-designated place
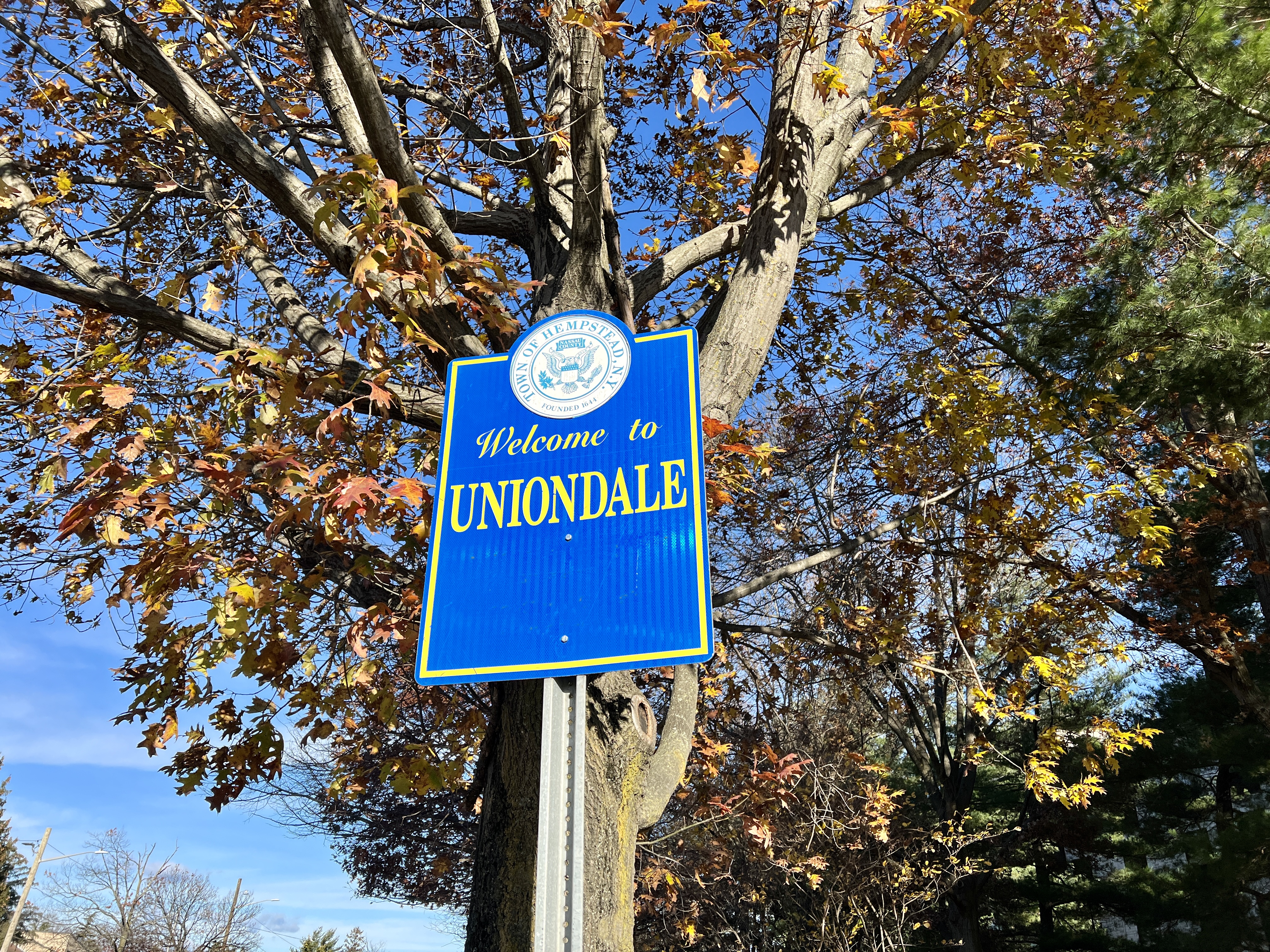
- A Uniondale welcome sign in 2021
- Nickname: Nassau Hub
- Motto: A global community for a global economy
- Location in Nassau County and the state of New York

- Location on Long Island Location within the state of New York
- Coordinates: 40°42′11″N 73°35′28″W
- Country: United States
- State: New York
- County: Nassau
- Town: Hempstead

Area
  - Total: 5.71 sq mi (14.79 km^{2})
  - Land: 5.71 sq mi (14.79 km^{2})
  - Water: 0 sq mi (0.00 km^{2})
- Elevation: 52 ft (16 m)

Population (2020)
  - Total: 32,473
  - Density: 5,686/sq mi (2,195.3/km^{2})
- Time zone: UTC−5 (Eastern (EST))
  - Summer (DST): UTC−4 (EDT)
- ZIP Codes: 11553, 11555, 11556 (Uniondale); 11530 (Garden City); 11549 (Hempstead); 11590 (Westbury)
- Area codes: 516, 363
- FIPS code: 36-76089
- GNIS feature ID: 0968229
- Website: uniondalechamber.com

Uniondale is a hamlet and census-designated place (CDP) in central Nassau County, New York, on Long Island, in the Town of Hempstead, within the New York metropolitan area. The population was 32,473 at the time of the 2020 United States census.

The CDP is home to Nassau Community College, Hofstra University's north campus and a portion of its southern campus, as well as the Nassau Veterans Memorial Coliseum.

== History ==
A one-room schoolhouse was built in 1830, which is the current site of the Uniondale Public Library. Hofstra University was established in the estate of William S. Hofstra (now Netherlands Hall) in 1935.

In the early 1970s, several Uniondale residents attempted to incorporate their hamlet as a village, citing dissatisfaction with the way their community was being represented on the board of the committee for redeveloping Mitchel Field, regarding matters like policies and the plans. Their incorporation plans were unsuccessful, and Uniondale remains an unincorporated hamlet governed by the Town of Hempstead.

Until 2015, the area of Uniondale north of the Hempstead Turnpike was a separate census-designated place called East Garden City.

== Geography ==
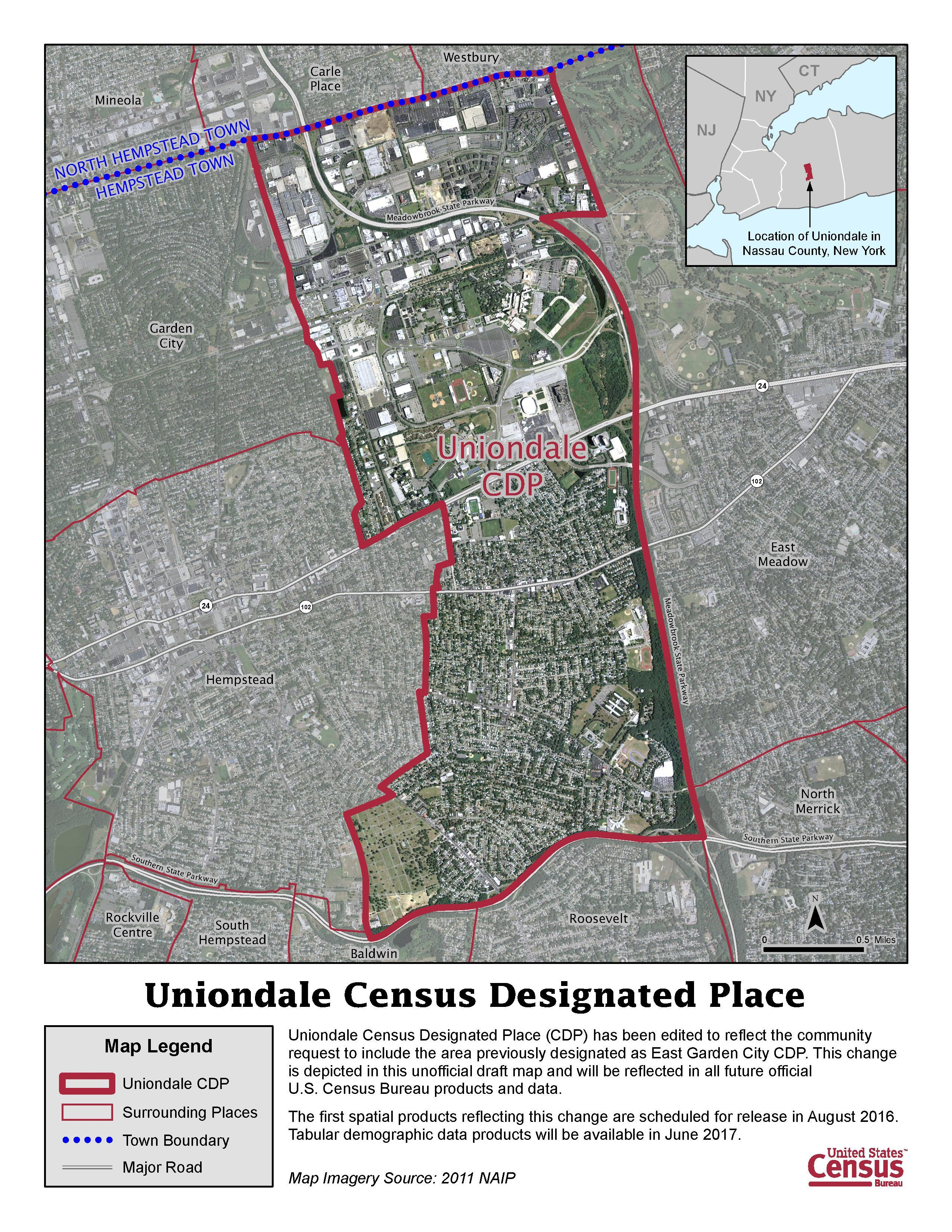
U.S. Census map of Uniondale

According to the United States Census Bureau, the CDP had a total area of 2.7 square miles (7.0 km^{2}), all land.

The Uniondale CDP gained territory between the 2010 census and the 2020 census, due to the hamlet and former CDP of East Garden City being absorbed by the CDP of Uniondale.

=== Climate ===
According to the Köppen climate classification, Uniondale has a Humid subtropical climate (type Cfa) with cool, wet winters and hot, humid summers. Precipitation is uniform throughout the year, with slight spring and fall peaks.

Climate data for Uniondale, New York, 1991–2020 normals, extremes 1999–present
Month	Jan	Feb	Mar	Apr	May	Jun	Jul	Aug	Sep	Oct	Nov	Dec	Year
Record high °F (°C)	71 (22)	73 (23)	85 (29)	94 (34)	97 (36)	103 (39)	105 (41)	104 (40)	100 (38)	90 (32)	83 (28)	76 (24)	105 (41)
Mean daily maximum °F (°C)	39 (4)	43 (6)	50 (10)	61 (16)	70 (21)	80 (27)	85 (29)	83 (28)	76 (24)	65 (18)	55 (13)	45 (7)	63 (17)
Mean daily minimum °F (°C)	26 (−3)	28 (−2)	34 (1)	42 (6)	51 (11)	61 (16)	66 (19)	65 (18)	58 (14)	48 (9)	40 (4)	31 (−1)	46 (8)
Record low °F (°C)	−10 (−23)	−7 (−22)	3 (−16)	13 (−11)	32 (0)	43 (6)	50 (10)	48 (9)	38 (3)	27 (−3)	10 (−12)	−1 (−18)	−10 (−23)
Average precipitation inches (mm)	3.62 (92)	3.17 (81)	4.35 (110)	4.15 (105)	3.90 (99)	3.85 (98)	4.40 (112)	3.72 (94)	3.91 (99)	4.08 (104)	3.73 (95)	3.82 (97)	46.7 (1,186)
Source: The Weather Channel

==== Plant zone ====
According to the United States Department of Agriculture (USDA), Garden City is located within hardiness zone 7b.

== Economy ==
Lufthansa United States has its headquarters in Uniondale, moving to the hamlet from adjacent East Meadow in 2019.

At one point, Swiss International Air Lines operated its United States office at 776 RexCorp Plaza in the EAB Plaza in Uniondale. The airline moved its offices from 41 Pinelawn Road in Melville, New York, around 2002.

== Demographics ==
Historical population
Census	Pop.	Note	%±
2000	23,011		—
2010	24,759		7.6%
2020	32,473		31.2%
U.S. Decennial Census

=== Racial and ethnic composition ===
Uniondale CDP, New York – Racial and ethnic composition Note: the US Census treats Hispanic/Latino as an ethnic category. This table excludes Latinos from the racial categories and assigns them to a separate category. Hispanics/Latinos may be of any race.
Race / Ethnicity (NH = Non-Hispanic)	Pop 2000	Pop 2010	Pop 2020	% 2000	% 2010	% 2020
White alone (NH)	4,056	2,497	5,644	17.63%	10.09%	17.38%
Black or African American alone (NH)	12,384	11,581	11,543	53.82%	46.77%	35.55%
Native American or Alaska Native alone (NH)	63	60	76	0.27%	0.24%	0.23%
Asian alone (NH)	472	499	1,119	2.05%	2.02%	3.45%
Native Hawaiian or Pacific Islander alone (NH)	18	13	12	0.08%	0.05%	0.04%
Other race alone (NH)	95	122	288	0.41%	0.49%	0.89%
Mixed race or Multiracial (NH)	662	371	857	2.88%	1.50%	2.64%
Hispanic or Latino (any race)	5,261	9,616	12,934	22.86%	38.84%	39.83%
Total	23,011	24,759	32,473	100.00%	100.00%	100.00%

=== 2020 census ===
As of the 2020 census, Uniondale had a population of 32,473. The median age was 35.3 years. 19.2% of residents were under the age of 18 and 16.4% of residents were 65 years of age or older. For every 100 females there were 90.0 males, and for every 100 females age 18 and over there were 87.5 males age 18 and over.

100.0% of residents lived in urban areas, while 0.0% lived in rural areas.

There were 7,850 households in Uniondale, of which 36.5% had children under the age of 18 living in them. Of all households, 45.7% were married-couple households, 17.0% were households with a male householder and no spouse or partner present, and 32.2% were households with a female householder and no spouse or partner present. About 20.7% of all households were made up of individuals and 11.8% had someone living alone who was 65 years of age or older.

There were 8,255 housing units, of which 4.9% were vacant. The homeowner vacancy rate was 0.6% and the rental vacancy rate was 7.1%.

Racial composition as of the 2020 census
Race	Number	Percent
White	6,657	20.5%
Black or African American	11,885	36.6%
American Indian and Alaska Native	352	1.1%
Asian	1,142	3.5%
Native Hawaiian and Other Pacific Islander	16	0.0%
Some other race	8,876	27.3%
Two or more races	3,545	10.9%
Hispanic or Latino (of any race)	12,934	39.8%

=== 2000 census ===
As of the 2000 census, there were 23,011 people, 6,026 households, and 4,826 families living in the CDP. The population density was 8,676.5 inhabitants per square mile (3,350.0/km^{2}). There were 6,201 housing units at an average density of 2,338.1 per square mile (902.7/km^{2}). The racial makeup of the CDP was 26.97% White, 55.53% Black, 0.35% Native American, 2.10% Asian, 0.08% Pacific Islander, 9.95% from other races, and 5.01% from two or more races. Hispanic or Latino of any race were 22.86% of the population.

Of the 6,026 households 39.3% had children under the age of 18 living with them, 52.9% were married couples living together, 20.9% had a female householder with no husband present, and 19.9% were non-families. Of all households 16.0% were one person and 8.5% were one person aged 65 or older. The average household size was 3.66 and the average family size was 3.95.

The age distribution was 26.5% under the age of 18, 9.7% from 18 to 24, 29.3% from 25 to 44, 21.9% from 45 to 64, and 12.6% 65 or older. The median age was 35 years. For every 100 females, there were 90.0 males. For every 100 females age 18 and over, there were 85.5 males.

The median household income was $61,410 and the median family income was $67,264. Males had a median income of $32,417 versus $31,169 for females. The per capita income was $19,069. About 6.0% of families and 8.8% of the population were below the poverty line, including 9.0% of those under age 18 and 12.9% of those age 65 or over.

== Sports ==
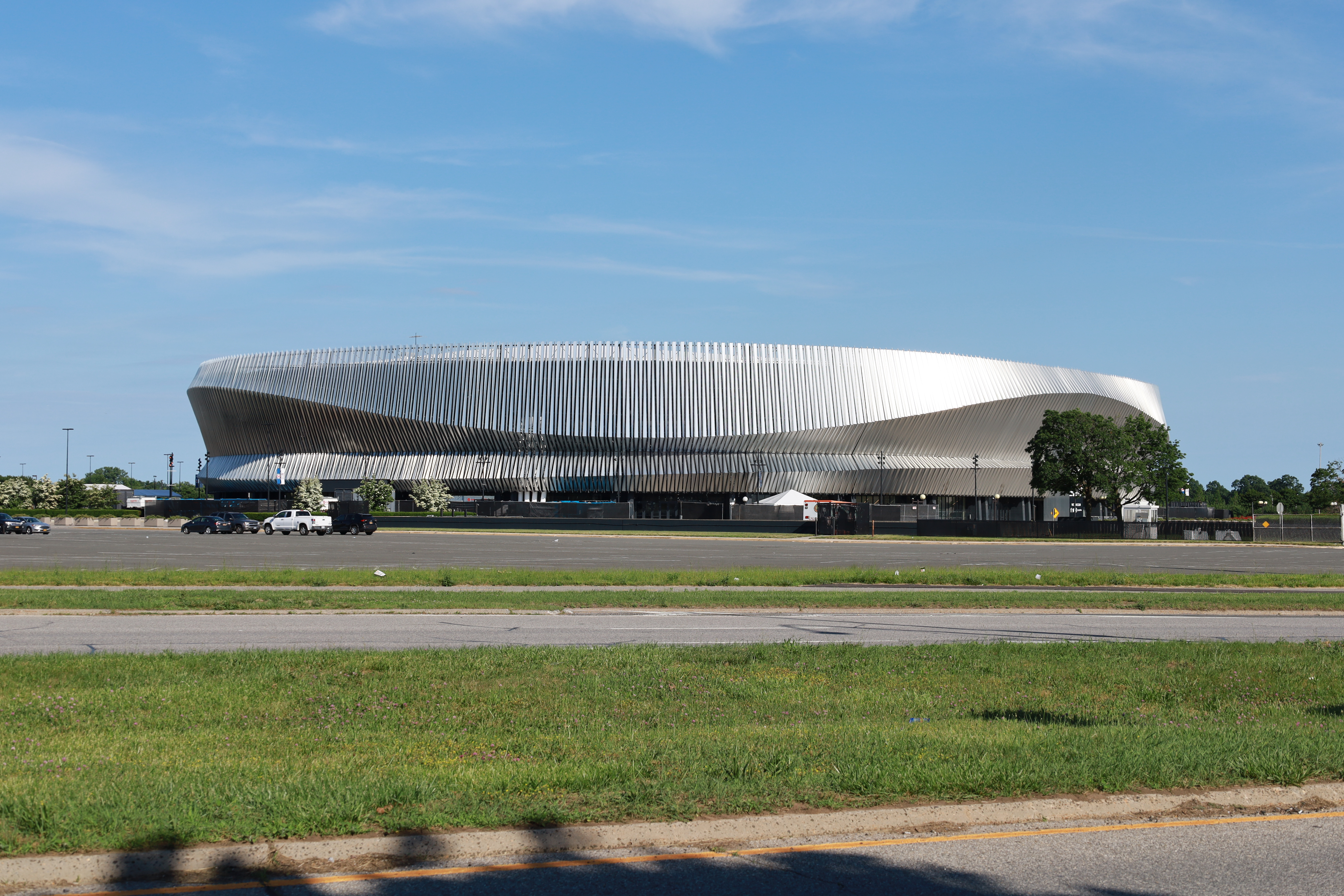
The Nassau Veterans Memorial Coliseum in 2021

Uniondale was formerly the home of the NHL's New York Islanders, who played at the Nassau Veterans Memorial Coliseum from 1972 until 2015, and again from 2018 until 2021. The 2014–15 NHL season was originally their final year at the Coliseum before the team moved to the Barclays Center in Brooklyn, New York City. Beginning in 2018, home games were split between Barclays and the Coliseum, and beginning in 2020, the Coliseum once again became the sole home arena for the Islanders until UBS Arena opened in 2021.

== Notable people ==
- Richard Blais, chef, reality show contestant, restaurateur and author.
- Gary Dell'Abate, longtime producer of The Howard Stern Show, grew up in Uniondale.
- Edward Goljan, pathologist, professor, and USMLE/COMLEX Board Review Teacher, grew up in Uniondale.
- Sheryl Lee Ralph, Broadway and film actor and singer, attended Uniondale High School.
- John Moschitta Jr., American spokesperson and actor, grew up in Uniondale.
- Aljamain Sterling, mixed martial artist and former UFC Bantamweight Champion, was born and raised in Uniondale.
- Busta Rhymes, rapper, graduated from Uniondale High School

== In popular culture ==
Uniondale has been the filming location for – or otherwise been the setting for scenes in – various films. Some of the scenes in The Spirit of St. Louis (1957) were set at Roosevelt Field, located within the East Garden City section of the CDP. Additionally, scenes for The Godfather (1972) were filmed on the present campus of Nassau Community Colleges, on the Mitchel Air Force Base's former runways.

== See also ==
- List of Census-designated places in New York
- Nassau Community College
- Hofstra University
- Uniondale High School
