= PowerNation =

Television series

PowerNation is a programming block of automotive how-to enthusiast television programs that began originally as the PowerBlock. It is currently produced by Gray Media, which purchased the assets of PowerNation's former owner Raycom Media in 2019. PowerNation consists of a block of automotive enthusiast shows including Engine Power, XOR (Xtreme Off Road), Truck Tech, and Detroit Muscle. PowerNation airs on the History Channel, and also features content on its own through a digital media player app available on the Amazon Fire TV, Apple TV and Roku platforms.

== History ==
PowerNation first began airing on The Nashville Network (commonly referred to as TNN, now the Paramount Network, which shifted to a general entertainment model in 2018 and stopped carrying PowerNation programming) in 1999 as PowerBlock. PowerBlock rebranded to PowerNation in 2014 and began airing on NBCSN and CBS Sports Network in addition to the Paramount Network. PowerBlock was originally hosted by Michelle Spaziano, followed by Danica Patrick. PowerNation was originally hosted by Courtney Hansen, then later by Katie Osborne. PowerNation is produced by RTM Studios in Franklin, TN.

== Programming ==
=== Engine Power ===
Engine Power (previously known as HorsePower, and originally Hot Rod TV) began airing in 1999 on The Nashville Network (now Paramount Network), hosted by Joe Elmore and Chuck Hanson, and later added Mike Galley. In later years, engine builders Buddy Hendricks then John Bouchard were added and shared co-hosting duties. Engine Power is currently hosted by Pat Topolinski and Frankie Forman. Engine Power follows a how-to show format that focuses on assembling and tuning everything from mild performance street engines to full-race monster engines.

=== Detroit Muscle ===
Detroit Muscle (previously known as MuscleCar) began airing in 2006 on Spike TV (now Paramount Network). MuscleCar was originally hosted by Lou Santiago and Jared Zimmerman, then later by Rick Bacon, Brent Buttrey, Tommy Boshers, Joe Elmore, Steve Mank, Marc Christ, Daniel Boshears and others throughout the years. Detroit Muscle is currently hosted by Boshers and Joel McMillan. Detroit Muscle follows a how-to show format restoring and modifying classic and late model muscle cars.

=== Truck Tech ===
Truck Tech (previously known as Trucks!) began airing in 1999 on The Nashville Network (now Paramount Network). Trucks! was originally hosted by Mel Fair and Stacey David. After David left in 2005, Trucks! was hosted by Kevin Tetz and Paul Vinson, then Ryan Shand, Jeremy Bumpus and others since then. Truck Tech was finally hosted by Lawrence "LT" Tolman and Austin LeFort. Truck Tech followed a how-to show format that showed viewers how to restore, modify, customize and paint classic and late model trucks.

Truck Tech has since been rebranded as Music City Trucks, hosted by Marc Christ and Brandon Burke, then by Christ and Eric Smart.

=== XOR ===
XOR (previously known as Xtreme 4x4 and Xtreme Off Road) began airing in 2005 on Spike TV (now Paramount Network). Xtreme 4x4 was originally hosted by Jessi Combs and Ian Johnson. Following the departure of Combs in 2008, Johnson hosted Xtreme Off Road for many years before departing in 2017. XOR was then hosted by Jeremy Weckman and Eliza Leon. XOR is a how-to show format where regular vehicles get turned into off road rigs.

XOR was replaced in the PowerNation lineup by Carcass, a show no longer focused solely on trucks and off-road vehicles, hosted by Weckman and Jimmy King.

=== Other programming ===
Over the years, RTM Studios has produced a variety of enthusiast programs for television and digital outlets including:

- PowerNation Daily (2015 - Current)
- PowerNation Garage (2016 - Current)
- PowerNation On The Road (2016 - Current)
- American Shooter
- The Gold Prospector
- Motor Trend
- Hot Rod
- Car and Driver Television
- RV Today
- Everything Outdoors
- Top Dead Center
- Search and Restore

==== PowerNation Daily ====
PowerNation Daily is a digital automotive news show featuring car and truck news and viral videos. PowerNation Daily is hosted by Gannon Pritchard.

==== PowerNation Garage ====
PowerNation Garage is a digital how to show hosted by the various hosts of PowerNation.

==== American Shooter ====
American Shooter was an American half-hour sports program which ran from 1993 to 2003, first on ESPN, and then on TNN (now Paramount Network), and finally, on OLN (now NBCSN). Hosted by Jim Scoutten. The show featured competitions, classic firearms, gun tech, and exhibition shooting. Each episode featured a segment called "Great Guns", featuring a look back at the classic firearms that shaped American history. The segments were originally narrated by Marc Stengel during the first two seasons. Beginning in Season 3 (1995), Scoutten narrated the segments, rather than Stengel. Another segment featured on American Shooter was Gun Tech, featuring the latest in guns, and shooting gear. This segment debuted in Season 5 (1997), and ran until the end of the series. The final segment of each episode called "Shot of the Week" featuring exhibition shooters demonstrating some shooting tips and techniques. The segments were originally hosted by Michael Blackburn and Byron Ferguson during the first two seasons. Beginning in Season 3 (1995), Bob Munden and John Satterwhite hosted the segments. But Satterwhite departed in Season 4 (1996), leaving Byron Ferguson, and Bob Munden. Byron Ferguson left the show at the end of Season 7 (1999), and was replaced by exhibition shooter Tom Knapp, who joined the show in Season 8 (2000), and stayed until the end of the series. American Shooter was produced by RTM Productions (now RTM Studios).

For the first four seasons, American Shooter was broadcast on ESPN, as part of their ESPN Outdoors block. In 1996, Guns & Ammo magazine bought the show from ESPN, and became Guns & Ammo presents American Shooter. In 1997, TNN picked up American Shooter as part of their TNN Outdoors block. In 2003, OLN picked up American Shooter, where they aired new episodes.
