= 2023 Birthday Honours =

Appointments made by King Charles III

The 2023 King's Birthday Honours are appointments by some of the 15 Commonwealth realms of King Charles III to various orders and honours to reward and highlight good works by citizens of those countries. The Birthday Honours are awarded as part of the King's Official Birthday celebrations during the month of June. They were announced on 17 June 2023.

The King appoints members to the orders upon the advice of his ministers. However, the Order of the Garter, the Order of the Thistle, the Order of Merit and the Royal Victorian Order are bestowed solely by the Sovereign.

== United Kingdom ==
Below are the individuals appointed by Charles III in his right as King of the United Kingdom with honours within his own gift, and with the advice of the Government for other honours.

=== Order of the Companions of Honour ===
Order of the Companions of Honour ribbon

==== Member of the Order of Companions of Honour (CH) ====
- Professor Sir John Irving Bell GBE FRS FREng. Regius Professor of Medicine, University of Oxford. For services to Medicine, Medical Research, the Life Science Industry and to Public Health.
- Ian Russell McEwan CBE. Novelist and Screenwriter. For services to Literature.
- Dame Anna Wintour DBE. Editor in Chief, Vogue, Global Editorial Director, Vogue and Global Content Officer, Condé Nast. For services to Fashion.

=== Knight Bachelor ===
Knight Bachelor ribbon

- Martin Louis Amis FRSL. Author. For services to Literature. (Officially he was awarded 18 May 2023, just one day before his death.)
- Professor Peter John Barnes FRS. Professor of Thoracic Medicine, Imperial College London. For services to Respiratory Science.
- The Right Honourable Benjamin Peter James Bradshaw MP. Member of Parliament for Exeter. For Political and Public Service.
- Robin Francis Budenberg CBE. Chair, The Crown Estate. For services to the Economy.
- David Jeremy Darroch. Lately Executive Chair, Sky. For services to Business, to Charity and to Sustainability.
- Stephen Arthur Frears. Director and Producer. For services to Film and Television.
- Rupert Alexander Gavin. For services to Drama, the Arts, to Heritage and to the Economy.
- Professor Iain Gilmour Gray CBE FRSE FREng. Director of Aerospace, Cranfield University. For services to the Aerospace Industry.
- Professor Ian Andrew Greer DL. Vice-chancellor, Queen's University Belfast. For services to Education and to the Economy.
- Professor Stephen Philip Jackson FRS. University of Cambridge Frederick James Quick Professor of Biology and Senior Group Leader, Cancer Research UK Cambridge Institute. For services to Innovation and Research.
- Dr. Richard John Mantle OBE DL. General Director, Opera North. For services to Opera.
- Ben Golden Emuobowho Okri OBE. Poet and Novelist. For services to Literature.
- The Honourable William Hartley Hume Shawcross CVO. For Public Service.
- Mark Thompson. Media Executive. For services to Media.
- Nicholas John Varney. Chief Executive, Merlin Entertainments. For services to the Visitor Economy.
- Professor Steven George West CBE DL. President, Universities UK and Vice-chancellor, University of the West of England. For services to Health and to Education.
- Professor Nairn Hutchison Fulton Wilson CBE. Honorary Founding President, College of General Dentistry. For services to dentistry.

Overseas and International

- Professor Oliver Simon D'Arcy Hart. Lewis P. and Linda L. Geyser University Professor, Harvard University, United States of America. For services to Economic Theory.

Guernsey

- Richard James McMahon. For services to the Crown and to the community in the Bailiwick of Guernsey

=== Most Honourable Order of the Bath ===
Order of the Bath ribbon

==== Knight Grand Cross of the Order of the Bath (GCB) ====
Military

- General Sir Mark Alexander Popham Carleton-Smith, KCB, CBE

==== Knight Commander of the Order of the Bath (KCB) ====
Military

- Vice Admiral Richard Charles Thompson, CBE
- Lieutenant General Nicholas Robert Macrae Borton, DSO, MBE

Civil

- Alex Chisholm. Permanent Secretary, Cabinet Office and Chief Operating Officer, Civil Service. For Public Service.

==== Companion of the Order of the Bath (CB) ====
Military

- Rear Admiral James Godfrey Higham, OBE
- Major General Paul Raymond Griffiths
- Major General Timothy John Hodgetts, CBE, KHS
- Major General Colin Richard James Weir, DSO, MBE
- Air Vice-Marshal Ranald Torquil Ian Munro, CBE, TD, VR, DL

Civil

- Adrian Duncan Baguley. Deputy Chief Executive and Director General Strategic Enablers, Defence Equipment and Support. For services to Defence.
- Martin Gerald Clarke. Government Actuary. For Public Service.
- Philip Duffy, CBE. Director General, Growth and Productivity, HM Treasury. For Public Service.
- Shona Hunter Dunn. Second Permanent Secretary, Department for Health and Social Care. For Public Service.
- Clive Andrew Maxwell, CBE. Lately Director General, High Speed Rail Group, Department for Transport. For services to Rail Transport.
- Emran Mian, OBE. Director General, Regeneration, Department for Levelling Up, Housing and Communities. For services to Regeneration.
- Shona Elizabeth Riach. UK Executive Director to the International Monetary Fund. For Public Service.

=== Most Distinguished Order of St Michael and St George ===
Order of St Michael and St George ribbon

==== Knight Grand Cross of the Order of St Michael and St George (GCMG) ====
- Sir Simon Gass KCMG, CVO, Chair, Joint Intelligence Committee, Cabinet Office. For services to National Security and British Foreign Policy.

==== Knight Commander of the Order of St Michael and St George (KCMG) ====
- Dr John Chipman CMG, Director-General and Chief Executive, The International Institute for Strategic Studies. For services to International Peace and Security.
- Peter Lewis CB, lately Registrar, International Criminal Court, The Hague, the Netherlands. For services to the International Criminal Court and to International Criminal Justice.
- Richard Moore CMG, Chief, Secret Intelligence Service. For services to National Security and British Foreign Policy.
- Terry Waite CBE, Co-Founder and President, Hostage International. For services to Charity and to Humanitarian Work.

==== Companion of the Order of St Michael and St George (CMG) ====
- Marcus Bleasdale, Photojournalist and Human Rights Activist. For services to International Photojournalism and to Human Rights.
- Vicky Bowman, Director, Myanmar Centre for Responsible Business. For services to Responsible Business and to Human Rights in Myanmar.
- Mark Cutts, lately United Nations Deputy Regional Humanitarian Coordinator for the Syria Crisis. For services to Humanitarian Assistance.
- Rob Harrison OBE, lately Director General, Russia/Ukraine and Director General, Analysis, COVID-19 Taskforce, Cabinet Office. For services to National Security and British Foreign Policy.
- Dr Michelle Haslem, Director General, Foreign, Commonwealth and Development Office. For services to British Foreign Policy.
- Kumar Iyer, Director General, Economics, Science and Technology, Foreign, Commonwealth and Development Office. For services to British Foreign Policy.
- Geoffrey Charles Knupfer, MBE. Lately Lead Forensic Scientist and Head of Investigation Team, Independent Commission for the Location of Victims' Remains. For Public Service.
- Ian Levy OBE, Director, Foreign, Commonwealth and Development Office. For services to British Foreign Policy.
- Jane Marriott OBE, lately High Commissioner, British High Commission Nairobi, Kenya. For services to British Foreign Policy.

=== Royal Victorian Order ===
Royal Victorian Order ribbon

==== Commander of the Royal Victorian Order (CVO) ====
- Nicholas Vincent John Barrett, lately Surgeon-Dentist to Her Majesty Queen Elizabeth II.
- Paul Christian Bell, lately Trustee, The Duke of Edinburgh’s International Award.
- Satyajit Bhattacharya, L.V.O., lately Serjeant-Surgeon to the Royal Household.
- The Right Honourable Paul Yaw, Baron Boateng, D.L. P.C., lately Trustee, The Duke of Edinburgh’s International Award.
- Alan John Farthing, lately Surgeon-Gynaecologist to the Royal Household.
- Dr. Angela Josepha Garvey, lately Lord-Lieutenant of the County Borough of Londonderry.
- Sarah Elizabeth Healey, C.B., lately Permanent Secretary, Department for Culture, Media and Sport, for services to the Royal Household.
- Robert Walter Hunter, Lord-Lieutenant of the Shetland Islands.
- John Guy Elmhirst Monson, Financial Advisor to the Household of The Prince and Princess of Wales, and former Trustee, The Royal Foundation of The Prince and Princess of Wales.
- Sir John Wilfred Peace, Lord-Lieutenant of Nottinghamshire.
- Andrew Jonathan Smith, lately Trustee, The Duke of Edinburgh’s International Award.
- Tracy Annette Watkins, L.V.O., Personal Assistant to the Lord Chamberlain, Royal Household.
- Garth John Weston, lately Trustee, The Duke of Edinburgh’s International Award.

==== Lieutenant of the Royal Victorian Order (LVO) ====
- Joanne Burcher, M.V.O., Visitor Services Manager, Palace of Holyroodhouse.
- Caroline Louise Creer, M.V.O., Secretariat Director, Private Secretary’s Office, Royal Household.
- Colonel Peter Robert Cowley Flach, M.B.E., lately Lieutenant, The King’s Body Guard of the Honourable Corps of Gentlemen-at-Arms.
- Gemma Catherine Teresa Kaza, M.V.O., lately Head of Collections and Inventory, former Household of The Prince of Wales and The Duchess of Cornwall.
- Belinda Margaret Georgiana Kim, Deputy Private Secretary to Her Majesty The Queen.
- Matthew Magee, Deputy Private Secretary to His Majesty The King.
- Timothy Peter Maynard, Head of Property Projects, Royal Household.
- Linda Susan Savides, M.V.O., lately Senior HR Manager, former Household of The Prince of Wales and The Duchess of Cornwall.
- Claudia Catherine Spens, M.V.O., lately Project Co-ordinator, former Household of The Prince of Wales and The Duchess of Cornwall.
- Commander Anne Gillian Sullivan, M.V.O., R.N., Deputy Private Secretary to The Princess Royal.
- Mark Ian Tentori, Member, Duchy of Lancaster Finance Committee.
- Susan Elizabeth Theobald, M.V.O., lately Personal Assistant to the Principal Private Secretary to The former Prince of Wales and The Duchess of Cornwall.

==== Member of the Royal Victorian Order (MVO) ====
- Timothy John Connery, Operations Engineer, Property Section, Windsor Castle.
- Sharon Jennifer Ann Gislingham. For services to the Royal Household.
- William John Graham, Learning Manager, Royal Collection, Buckingham Palace.
- Anna Margaret Greenleaf (Anna Henderson) lately HR Manager, former Household of The Prince of Wales and The Duchess of Cornwall.
- Ruth Hatley, lately Receptionist, former Household of The Prince of Wales and The Duchess of Cornwall.
- Darren Terence Haynes, Accountant, Sandringham Estate.
- Natalie Elise Hegarty, lately Assistant Communications Secretary, former Household of The Prince of Wales and The Duchess of Cornwall.
- Timothy Charles Hewitt, Detective Inspector, Metropolitan Police Service. For services to Royalty Protection.
- Janice Annette Hook, lately Head of General Correspondence, former Household of The Prince of Wales and The Duchess of Cornwall.
- Laura Louise King, Assistant Communications Secretary, Royal Household.
- Simon King, Sergeant, Metropolitan Police Service. For services to Royalty Protection.
- Elaine Olive MacLean, Administrative Assistant, Superintendent’s Office, Palace of Holyroodhouse.
- Emily Charlotte Louise Martin, Assistant Private Secretary to The Duke and Duchess of Gloucester.
- Jo-Anne Louise Mead, lately Events Co-ordinator and Administrator, former Household of The Prince of Wales and The Duchess of Cornwall.
- Sally Ann O’Neill, lately Deputy Treasurer to Her Majesty Queen Elizabeth II.
- Shila Patel, Payroll Officer, Privy Purse and Treasurer’s Office, Royal Household.
- Iain Petrie, Sergeant, Metropolitan Police Service. For services to Royalty Protection.
- Julian Charles Phillips. For services to the Royal Household.
- Joanne Sarah Purcell, lately General Correspondence Secretary, former Household of The Prince of Wales and The Duchess of Cornwall.
- Anna Maria Rischitelli, Functions Co-ordinator, Government House, Victoria, Australia.
- Jennifer Helen Wideson, Operations Manager, Superintendent’s Office, Windsor Castle.
- Sophia Katharine Wills, Senior Metalwork Conservator, Royal Collection, Royal Household.
- Paula Wilson, lately Financial Controller and Deputy Treasurer, former Household of The Prince of Wales and The Duchess of Cornwall.
- Andrew John Wright, lately Head Wandsman, Royal Maundy Services.
- Paul Leddington Wright, lately Secretary, Royal Almonry, Royal Household.

=== Royal Victorian Medal (RVM) ===
Royal Victorian Medal ribbon

Bar to the Silver

- Peter Thomas Charles Clayton, R.V.M., Head Gamekeeper, Crown Estate, Windsor.
- Huw Gordon Jones, R.V.M., Tractor Driver/Stockman, Royal Farms, Windsor.
- Nicholas Simon Matthews, R.V.M., Mobile Warden, Windsor Great Park, Crown Estate.
- Robert James McGee, R.V.M., Carpenter, Crown Estate, Windsor.
- Gordon Raymond John Robinson, R.V.M., Mobile Warden, Windsor Great Park, Crown Estate.

Silver

- Stuart Neil Crossan, Head Gardener, Government House, Jersey.
- Terry Alan Humphries, Yeoman Warder, H.M. Tower of London.
- Brian Francis Lees, Foreman, Balmoral Castle.
- Stella June McLaren, lately Hat Maker to Her Majesty Queen Elizabeth II.
- Stephen John Shand, lately Chauffeur, Royal Mews, Royal Household.
- Anne Theresa Stevens, Daily Cleaner, Bagshot Park.
- Estrellita Mateo Talbot, Dresser to Princess Alexandra, the Honourable Lady Ogilvy.
- Carol Margaret Leslie Turpie, Warden, Palace of Holyroodhouse.
- Peter Whyte, Warden, Palace of Holyroodhouse.

=== Most Excellent Order of the British Empire ===
Civil division ribbon

Military division ribbon

==== Dame Commander of the Order of the British Empire (DBE) ====
Civil

- Jacqueline Marie Baillie. Deputy Leader of the Scottish Labour Party. For Political and Public Service.
- Professor Averil Olive Bradley (Averil Mansfield), CBE. For services to Surgery and to Equality in Medicine.
- Professor Diane Coyle, CBE. Bennett Professor of Public Policy, University of Cambridge. For services to Economics.
- Annette King. Chief Executive Officer, Publicis Groupe UK. For services to Advertising and to the Creative Industries.
- Susan Carol Langley, OBE. Non-Executive Chair, Gallagher UK and lately Lead Non-Executive Director, Home Office. For Public Service and to the Financial Services Industry.
- Kathryn Alexandra McDowell, CBE, DL. Managing Director, London Symphony Orchestra. For services to Music.
- Professor Eleanor Jane Milner-Gulland. Tasso Leventis Chair in Biodiversity, Department of Biology, Oxford University. For services to International Conservation.
- Elizabeth Mary Nicholl, CBE. President, World Netball. For services to Sport.
- Dr. Neslyn Eugenie Watson-Druée, CBE. Voluntary Chair, Birmingham and Midlands Women Economic Forum. For services to Women and to Ethnic Minorities.
- Professor Melanie Joanne Welham. Executive Chair, Biotechnology and Biological Sciences Research Council. For services to Bioscience.

==== Commander of the Order of the British Empire (CBE) ====
Military

- Rear Admiral Timothy Christopher Woods
- Commodore James Robert Dean, OBE
- Brigadier Andrew Stuart Garner, OBE
- Brigadier Anna Clare Luedicke, OBE
- Brigadier Toby Lloyd Rowland
- Colonel (now Acting Brigadier) Nicholas Thomas
- Air Commodore Anthony John Beasent
- Air Commodore Emily Jane Flynn, OBE
- Group Captain Sara Bridget Mackmin

Civil

- Professor David Samuel Harvard Abulafia, FBA. Emeritus Professor of Mediterranean History, University of Cambridge. For services to Scholarship.
- Professor Derek Alderson. Chair, Centre for Perioperative Care and lately President, Royal College of Surgeons of England. For services to Surgery.
- Zahra Shiva Bahrololoumi. Chief Executive Officer, Salesforce UKI. For services to the Information Technology Sector.
- John Charles Baron, MP. Member of Parliament for Basildon and Billericay. For Political and Public Service.
- Professor Paliarkarakadu Assen Muhammed Basheer, FREng. Chair in Structural Engineering, University of Leeds. For services to Civil Engineering.
- Brigadier Neil Alexander Crerar Baverstock, OBE. Yeoman Usher, House of Lords. For services to Parliament and to the State Funeral of Her Majesty Queen Elizabeth II.
- Donna Bell. Director, Social Care and National Care Service Development, Scottish Government. For Public Service.
- David John Bellamy. Chief of Staff to the Mayor of London, Greater London Authority. For services to the State Funeral of Her Majesty Queen Elizabeth II.
- Ann Elizabeth Bentley. Global Board Member, Rider Levett Bucknall. For services to Construction.
- Robert John Blackman, MP. Member of Parliament for Harrow East. For Political and Public Service.
- Ivor Bolton. Conductor. For services to Music.
- Roy Brannen. Interim Director General, Net Zero, Energy and Transport, Scottish Government. For services to Transport in Scotland on the Demise of Her Majesty Queen Elizabeth II.
- Major General Nicholas John Caplin, CB. Chief Executive Officer, Blind Veterans UK. For services to Veterans and to the Vision Impaired.
- Anthony John Valerian Cheetham. Publisher. For services to Literature.
- Michael Hugh Cherry, OBE. Lately Chair, Federation of Small Businesses. For services to Business and to International Trade.
- Kenneth Cranham. Actor. For services to Drama.
- Peter Anthony Davies, OBE. Chair, Smart Energy Code Panel. For services to the Energy Industry and Net Zero Emissions.
- Cynthia Verna Davis. Founder, Diversifying Group Ltd. For services to Equality, Diversity, and Inclusion.
- Barrie Chisholm Deas, OBE. Lately Chief Executive, National Federation of Fishermen's Organisations. For services to the Fishing Industry.
- Mark David Ducker, OBE. Lately Chief Executive Officer, STEP Academy Trust, Thornton Heath, London Borough of Croydon. For services to Education.
- Professor Thomas John Evans. Professor of Molecular Microbiology, University of Glasgow. For services to Healthcare during Covid-19.
- Clenton Anthony Farquharson, MBE. Associate and lately Chair, Think Local Act Personal. For services to Disability Personalisation, to Social Care and to Health Policy.
- Professor Anne Carla Ferguson-Smith, FRS, FMedSci. Pro-vice-chancellor for Research and International Partnerships, and the Arthur Balfour Professor of Genetics, University of Cambridge. For services to Medical Research.
- Dr. Peta Jane Dunckley Foxall. Lately Chair, The Wildlife Trusts. For services to Nature Conservation.
- Professor Vincent Francis Fusco, FREng. Professor, High Frequency Electronic Engineering, School of Electronics, Electrical Engineering and Computer Science, Queen's University Belfast. For services to Science and to Engineering.
- Rev. Canon Nigel Mark Genders. Chief Education Officer, Church of England. For services to Education.
- Alan George Gibb. Head of Sea Fisheries, Marine Scotland. For services to Marine Resources in Scotland.
- John Greig, MBE. For services to Association Football and to the community in Scotland.
- Derek Grieve. Deputy Director, Head of Vaccinations Division, Scottish Government. For services to Public Health during Covid-19.
- Andrew George Haldane, FRS. Chief Executive, Royal Society of Arts. For services to the Economy and to Public Policy.
- William Benedict Hamilton-Dalrymple. Historian, Author and Art Curator. For services to Literature and to the Arts.
- Christopher Hampson. Chief Executive Officer and Artistic Director, Scottish Ballet. For services to Dance.
- Edward Harley, OBE. Chair, Acceptance in Lieu Panel. For services to Heritage, to Charity and to the community in Herefordshire.
- Angela Yvette Hillery. Chief Executive, Northamptonshire Healthcare NHS Foundation Trust and Leicestershire Partnership NHS Trust. For services to the NHS.
- Damian Andrew Hopkins. Founder, The Radius Group. For services to the Retail Industry.
- Professor Medwin Hughes, DL. Vice-chancellor, University of Wales and University of Wales Trinity St David Group. For services to Education and to the Welsh Language.
- Professor Debra Jean Humphris. Vice-chancellor, University of Brighton. For services to Education and to the NHS.
- Sarah Alice Hunter, MBE. Captain, England Women's Rugby Union Team. For services to Rugby Union.
- Jane Elizabeth Hutt, MS. Minister for Social Justice, Welsh Government and Senedd Member for Vale of Glamorgan. For Political and Public Service.
- Dr. Susan Louise Ibbotson. Lately Regional Director of Public Health, Midlands and Regional Director, Office for Health Improvement and Disparities, Department of Health and Social Care. For services to Public Health.
- Celia Diana Savile Imrie. Actress. For services to Drama.
- John Brian Hansen Johnson. Lately Chief Executive Officer, Maritime and Coastguard Agency. For services to the Maritime Industry.
- Professor Christopher John Hugh Jones. Deputy Chief Medical Officer, Welsh Government. For services to Healthcare.
- Vincent Thomas Keaveny. Lately Lord Mayor of London. For services to Socio-Economic Advancement, to British-Irish relations and to the City of London.
- Professor Peter James Kelly. Regional Director of Public Health, Office for Health Improvements and Disparities, Department of Health and Social Care. For services to Public Health.
- Ian Peter Kenyon. Director, Finance and Programmes, Defence Nuclear Organisation, Ministry of Defence. For services to Public Finance and to Volunteering.
- David Richard Kilburn. Founder, MKM Building Supplies. For services to the Construction Industry and to Charity.
- Michael King, OBE. Local Government and Social Care Ombudsman. For services to Local Government.
- Nicholas David Gordon Knight, OBE. Photographer. For services to Fashion and to Photography.
- Barbara Anne Laithwaite. Managing Director, Laithwaites. For services to the Wine Industry.
- Peter John Lawson. Chair, Scottish Opera. For services to the Arts in Scotland.
- Simon David Lebus. Interim Chief Regulator, Ofqual. For services to Educational Assessment.
- David John Lewis. Co-Founder and Co-Chair, Commission for Looted Art in Europe. For services to the Return of Looted Art.
- Dr. Paul Gregory Kieran Little. Principal and Chief Executive, City of Glasgow College. For services to Education.
- Tasmin Elizabeth Little, OBE. Violinist. For services to Music.
- Laura Elizabeth Marks, OBE. Social Activist and Broadcaster. For services to Interfaith Relations, to Holocaust Education and Commemoration and to Women's Empowerment.
- Therese Lynn Miller, OBE. Non-Executive Director, Galliford Try plc, Stelrad Group plc, Goldman Sachs International, Rothesay Life, and Goldman Sachs International Bank. For services to the Financial Sector.
- Ceri Ann Morgan. Director, EU and International Trade, Department for Environment, Food and Rural Affairs. For services to Capability and Inclusion in International Trade.
- Dr. Edward Patrick Morris. Lately President, Royal College of Obstetricians and Gynaecologists and Consultant Gynaecologist, Norfolk and Norwich University NHS Foundation Trust. For services to the Improvement of Women's Healthcare and to Patient Safety.
- Paul Noble Wilson Morrison. Director, Ukraine Humanitarian Taskforce and Refugee Resettlement and Asylum Support, Department for Levelling Up, Housing and Communities. For services to Refugees.
- Elizabeth Margaret Murray (Elma Murray), OBE. Deputy Chair, Developing the Young Workforce, Employers' Forum. For services to Young People in Scotland.
- Professor Paul Michael Newman, FREng. BP Professor in Information Engineering, University of Oxford. For services to Technology and Engineering.
- Professor Julia Alison Noble, OBE, FRS, FREng. Technikos Professor of Biomedical Engineering, University of Oxford. For services to Engineering and Biomedical Imaging.
- Phillip Mark Hayes O'Dell. Lately Director of Flight Operations and Chief Test Pilot, Rolls-Royce. For services to UK Aviation.
- Olivia Clare Pinkney, QPM. Chief Constable, Hampshire and Isle of Wight Constabulary. For services to Policing.
- Judith Ragan, OBE. Trustee, The Queensmill Trust. For services to Children and Young People with Special Educational Needs.
- Carolyn Ann Regan. Chief Executive, West London NHS Trust. For Public Service.
- Dr. Sheila Baillie Mackenzie Reith. Lately Consultant Physician. For services to People with Diabetes.
- Professor Eleanor Mary Riley, FRSE, FMedSci. Professor of Immunology and Infectious Disease, University of Edinburgh. For services to Immunology.
- David James Ring. Independent Chair, National Shipbuilding Projects. For services to Shipbuilding.
- Clifford Mark Robson. Group Managing Director, BAE Systems. For services to the Defence Industry.
- Stephen Edward Rogers. Lately District Judge County and Family Court, Chair of Mental Health Tribunal and Recorder of the Crown Court. For services to the Administration of Justice.
- Mary Patricia Ryan. Founder and Director, Cyber Girls First. For services to STEM Education for Girls and to the Provision of IT Equipment for Children in Hospital.
- Eve Caroline Samson. Clerk of the Journals, House of Commons. For services to Parliament and to the State Funeral of Her Majesty Queen Elizabeth II.
- Charles Adam Laurie Sebag-Montefiore. Trustee, National Gallery. For services to the Arts and to Culture.
- Professor Caroline Mary Series, FRS. Emeritus Professor of Mathematics, University of Warwick. For services to Mathematics.
- Gary Paul John Shaughnessy. Chair, Z Zurich Foundation and Parkinson's UK. For services to Business and to Charity.
- Peter Francis Sheridan, OBE, DL. Chief Executive, Co-Operation Ireland. For services to Peacebuilding.
- Professor Giuliana Silvestri. Clinical Director, Ophthalmology, Belfast Health and Social Care Trust and Clinical Lead, NI Eyecare Network. For services to Ophthalmology and Eyecare in Northern Ireland.
- James Roland Sinker. Chief Executive, Cambridge University Hospitals NHS Foundation Trust. For services to Healthcare.
- Elizabeth Ann Sloan. Director, Annie Sloan Interiors Ltd. For services to Interior Design.
- Professor Deborah Anne Swallow. Märit Rausing Director, Courtauld Institute of Art. For services to Art and to Education.
- María Silvana Tenreyro. For services to the Economy.
- Ann Elizabeth Underwood. Deputy Finance Director, Defence Equipment and Support, Ministry of Defence. For services to Defence.
- Simon Robert Vincent, OBE. Executive Vice President, Hilton Group Europe, Middle East and Africa. For services to the Tourism Industry.
- Anthony Watson. Chief Executive Officer and Founder, The Bank of London, and Advocate for LGBT Equality. For services to the LGBT Community, to Equality and to Diversity.
- Anne Rachel Webber. Co-Founder and Co-Chair, Commission for Looted Art in Europe. For services to the Return of Looted Art.
- Gordon George Welsh. Lately Head of Business Group, UK Export Finance. For services to Business.
- Stephen Frank Welton. Founder and Chair, BGF. For services to Small Businesses and Entrepreneurship.
- Mark Steven White, OBE, DL. Lately Chair, Education Training Collective. For services to Further Education.
- Charles Alexander Wilson. Lately President, Grocery Aid. For services to Business and Philanthropy.
- Duncan Henry Wilson, OBE. Chief Executive, Historic England. For services to Heritage.
- Dr. Janet Young. Lately Government Head of Property Profession, Cabinet Office. For Public Service.

==== Officer of the Order of the British Empire (OBE) ====
Military

- Commander Charles Michael Barrow, Royal Navy, C039605X.
- Commander Ian Gerald Danbury, Royal Navy, C030050R.
- Colonel Jonathan Wyn Dowd, Royal Marines, N028417W.
- Captain Francis Durham Hirons, Royal Navy, C038755J.
- Captain Stephen Andrew Large, Royal Navy, C036104F.
- Lieutenant Colonel Michael John Scanlon, Royal Marines, N029361M.
- Commander Fergus Steven Walker, Royal Navy, C042079H.
- Colonel Richard David Hadley Ball, 551241.
- Colonel Sharon Mary Beatty, AARC, 551953.
- Lieutenant Colonel James Campbell, The Royal Regiment of Scotland, Army Reserve, 533586.
- Colonel David Roland Cockwell, MBE, 531430.
- Lieutenant Colonel Belinda Lorraine Forsyth, MBE, Adjutant General’s Corps (Royal Military Police), 536565.
- Lieutenant Colonel (now Acting Colonel) Rebecca Sarah Jacques-Grey, Royal Corps of Signals, 554306.
- Colonel (now Acting Brigadier) Tobias Lambert, 555493.
- Lieutenant Colonel Philip Robert Nathan, The Duke of Lancaster’s Regiment, 544377.
- Warrant Officer Class 1 Andrew John Stokes, MVO, Coldstream Guards, 24830026.
- Colonel Tim John Symonds, 551380.
- Colonel Andrew Derrick Watson, 553473.
- Wing Commander Tracey Louise Affleck, Royal Air Force, 306472U.
- Group Captain Leonie Boyd, Royal Air Force, 2659122P.
- Group Captain James Matthew Calvert, Royal Air Force, 8700017V.
- Wing Commander Victoria Ann Fulton, Royal Air Force, 2659486K.
- Wing Commander Craig Robert Ledieu, MBE, Royal Air Force, T8600144.
- Wing Commander Anthony John Lett, Royal Air Force, 8260973E.
- Wing Commander Victoria Tuesday Williams, Royal Air Force, 8302849T.
- Wing Commander Jonathan Robert Gibson Young, Royal Air Force, 8701571C.

Civil

- Katherine Ruth Abbott. Capability and Performance Management Lead, Department for Levelling Up, Housing and Communities. For services to Human Resources and Mental Health.
- Khurshid Alam. Chair, Academy for Advanced Studies and Training UK International. For services to BAME Healthcare and the Professional Development of BAME Doctors.
- Professor Dario Renato Alessi, FRS, FRSE. Professor of Signal Transduction, University of Dundee. For services to Biomedical Research and Translation.
- Dr. Parvinder Kaur Aley. Director of Global Operations, Oxford Vaccine Group, University of Oxford. For services to Vaccination during Covid-19.
- Leanne Almond. Lately Deputy Director, National Crime Agency. For services to Law Enforcement.
- Luke Anthony. Senior Officer, National Crime Agency. For services to Law Enforcement.
- Dr. Elaine Arnold. Founder, Separation and Reunion Forum. For services to Children of African Descent and to Charity.
- Christopher Paul Ashworth. Head of Social Impact, Nominet. For services to Social Equality, Inclusion and to the Voluntary Sector.
- Anthony Keith Atherton. For services to Disability Sport and to Inclusion.
- James Keith Babbington. Vice Chair, National Association of Civic Officers. For services to the State Funeral of Her Majesty Queen Elizabeth II.
- Mark Jonathan Bailey. Executive Director, UK Centre for Ecology and Hydrology. For services to Microbial Ecology and Scientific Leadership.
- Vincent James Bailey. Lately Leader, Conservative Group, Vale of Glamorgan Council. For Political, Voluntary and Charitable services.
- Rhona Margaret Baillie. Chief Executive, The Prince and Princess of Wales Hospice, Glasgow. For services to Palliative Care and to the Hospice Movement.
- Antony Ellis Baines. Executive Director for Services, The Royal British Legion. For services to the Armed Forces Community.
- John Nigel Barnes. Chief Executive Officer, Historic Royal Palaces. For services to Heritage.
- Nicholas Guy Baveystock, DL. Director General and Secretary, Institution of Civil Engineers. For services to Engineering.
- Dr. Timothy David Bestwick. Chair, Harwell Science and Innovation Campus. For services to the Commercialisation of Science, Technology and Innovation.
- Ceinwen Blake. Deputy Director, Corporate Information Technology and Services, Office for National Statistics. For Public Service.
- Patricia Margaret Brennan-Barrett. Chief Executive Officer and Principal, Northampton College, Northamptonshire. For services to Further Education.
- James William John Brereton. Lately Deputy Director, Transport Security Operations Centre, Department for Transport. For services to the State Funeral of Her Majesty Queen Elizabeth II.
- Elizabeth Jane Brewin. Lately Chief Executive, Tommy's. For services to Women's Health.
- Pippa Britton. Lately Vice-Chair, UK Anti-Doping and Vice-Chair Sport Wales. For services to Sport.
- Clare Parry Brunton, MBE. Deputy Director, Major Events Directorate, Cabinet Office. For services to the State Funeral of Her Majesty Queen Elizabeth II.
- Chantal Louise Bryan. Founding Trustee and Campaigner, Teach Us Too. For services to Children and Young People with Special Educational Needs.
- Gareth Richard Bullock. For services to the Welsh Financial Economy.
- David Colleton Buxton. Chief Executive Officer, Action on Disability and lately Chair, British Deaf Association. For services to the Deaf and British Sign Language Communities.
- Alison Byrne. Interim Director for Equality, Inclusion and Human Rights, Scottish Government. For services to the Ukraine Crisis.
- Kevin Byrne. Founder, Checkatrade.com. For services to Industry and to Consumer Protection.
- Dr. Audrey Cameron. Chair, British Sign Language Plan Working Group, University of Edinburgh. For services to Chemical Sciences and to Inclusion in Science Communications.
- John Raymond Camp. Chief Executive Officer, The Compass Partnership of Schools, Royal Borough of Greenwich and Essex. For services to Education.
- Michele Louise Campbell-Louden. Assistant Director, Immigration Prison Team, Home Office. For services to Immigration and to National Security.
- Dr. Gail Lindsay Carson. Director of Network Development, International Severe Acute Respiratory and Emerging Infections Consortium. For services to Global Health.
- Anuj Jayantilal Chande. Partner, Grant Thornton. For services to International Trade and Investment.
- Professor Ian Charles. Director, Quadram Institute and Professor, Norwich Medical School, University of East Anglia. For services to Science and Clinical Research.
- Professor Carolyn Anne Chew-Graham. Professor of General Practice Research, Keele University and Lately Chair, Society of Academic Primary Care. For services to General Practice and Patient Care, and to Primary Care Research, particularly into Long Covid.
- Andrew James Churchill, FREng. Executive Chairman, JJ Churchill Ltd. For services to Engineering.
- Trevor Clare. Team Leader, Ministry of Defence. For services to Defence.
- Michael Kenneth Claridge. Operations and Customer Interface Team Leader, Defence Equipment and Support, Ministry of Defence. For services to Defence.
- David Philip Clarke. Chief Executive Officer, British Paralympic Association. For services to Paralympic Sport.
- Linda Jayne Cobb. Principle Manager, Decent and Safe Homes Services (DASH), Derby City Council. For services to Housing.
- Damian Collins, MP. Member of Parliament for Folkestone and Hythe. For Political and Public Service.
- Anthony Cook. Senior Officer, National Crime Agency. For services to Law Enforcement.
- Philip Michael Cook. Lately Chief Executive and Group Principal of Education Training Collective, Stockton-on-Tees, County Durham. For services to Further Education.
- Professor Aravinthan Coomarasamy. Professor of Gynaecology and Reproductive Medicine, University of Birmingham. For services to Maternal Health.
- Richard Devereux Burcombe Cooper. Lately Chair of Trustees, Rambert School of Ballet and Contemporary Dance. For services to Dance.
- Jonathan Simon Cox. Deputy Director, Citizens UK. For services to Community Organising and Refugee Resettlement.
- Susan Christine Cox. Founder and Director of SMART-UK. For services to Addicts in Prison.
- Lisa Anne Crausby. Executive Director, Star Academies, Blackburn, Lancashire. For services to Education.
- Lucy Mary Elizabeth Crowe. Soprano. For services to Music.
- Jo-Ann D'Costa-Manuel. Autism Ambassador and Parent Advocate. For services to Children and Young People with Autism.
- Simon Daglish. Co-Founder, Walking With The Wounded and Fundraiser, Tommy's. For Charitable Services.
- Dr. Kevin John Daly. Co-Head of Central and Eastern Europe, Middle East and Africa Economics, Goldman Sachs' Global Macro Research. For services to Economics.
- Professor Prokar Dasgupta. Foundation Professor of Surgery, King's Health Partners and Chair in Robotic Surgery and Urological Innovation, King's College London. For services to Surgery and Science.
- Janet Davies. For services to Healthcare in Wales.
- Roy Allan Steven Devon. Head of Events and Exhibitions, Scottish Parliament. For services in Scotland on the Demise of Her Majesty Queen Elizabeth II.
- Frances Anne Dickens. Founder and Chair, Astus Group. For services to Media Trading.
- Keith Michael Donnelly. Fire and Rescue Service Adviser UK. For services to Fire and Rescue.
- Jonathan Michael Dutton. Chief Executive Officer, Rugby League World Cup. For services to Rugby.
- Michael John Edgar. Director, Mike Edgar Production Ltd. For services to the State Funeral of Her Majesty Queen Elizabeth II.
- Bianca Jutta Effemey. Co-Founder and Chief Executive Officer, Momentum Children's Charity. For services to Young People with Life Challenging Conditions.
- Oluwafemi Elufowoju, Jr. Director and Actor. For services to Drama.
- Tina Louise Emery. Co-Chair, National Network of Parent Carer Forums. For services to Children and Young People with Special Educational Needs and Disabilities.
- Lawrence James English. Lately Senior District Crown Prosecutor, West Midlands. For services to Law and Order.
- Anthony John Plowden Eyton. Artist. For services to Painting and to the Art Community.
- Peter Alan Farr. Head of Civil Law Policy, Ministry of Justice. For services to Civil Justice.
- Mark Alexander Fawcett. Chief Executive Officer, Nest Invest. For services to Pension Saving.
- Robert Francis Fellows. Lately Head of Education, College of Paramedics. For services to Paramedic Education.
- Yvonne Anita Field. Founder and Chief Executive Officer, The Ubele Initiative. For services to the Voluntary, Community and Social Enterprise Sector and to Social Justice.
- Xenia Mary Fletcher (Xenia Carr-Griffiths). For services to the Public Sector and to the British Retail Industry.
- Simon McLean Flowers. Executive Principal, Carr Manor Community School, Leeds, and Chief Executive Officer, Leeds Learning Alliance. For services to Education.
- Dr. Susan Rosemary Foister. Director of Public Programmes and Partnerships, The National Gallery. For services to Art.
- Laura Frances Fretwell. Head of Ceremonial Team, Northern Ireland Office. For services to the State Funeral of Her Majesty Queen Elizabeth II.
- Neil Frow. Managing Director, NHS Wales Shared Services Partnership. For services to NHS Wales.
- Zoe Jane Fry. Director, The Outstanding Society. For services to Social Care and Nursing.
- William Fullen. Lately Chief Executive, Believe Housing. For services to Housing.
- Martino Gamper. Product Designer. For services to Design.
- Dr. Edmund Ross Garratt. Chief Executive, NHS Suffolk and North East Essex. For services to the Integrated Care System.
- Hugh Dunlop Gillies. For services to Transport in Scotland on the Demise of Her Majesty Queen Elizabeth II.
- Victoria Gradden. Head, Royal Navy's Domestic Engagement. For services to the State Funeral of Her Majesty Queen Elizabeth II.
- Brigadier John Thomas Graham, DL. For services to the Military and to the community in Northern Ireland.
- Lydia Greenway. Founder, Cricket for Girls and lately Cricket Player. For services to Cricket.
- Suzanne Lisa Griffin. Deputy Director, DWP Digital, Department for Work and Pensions. For Public Service.
- David Roger Griffiths. For services to Association Football in Wales.
- Freya Rose Grimwood. Lately Principal Private Secretary to the Law Officers, Attorney General's Office. For Public Service.
- Dr. Claire Marie Guest. Co-Founder, Chief Executive and Chief Scientific Officer, Medical Detection Dogs. For services to Medical Knowledge, Public Health and Wellbeing.
- Camilla Anne, Countess of Halifax. Lately President, Macmillan Cancer Support. For voluntary services to People Affected by Cancer.
- Beverley Ann Halligan. Principal Social Worker, Children and Families, London Borough of Newham. For services to Social Care.
- Thomas Edward Halliwell. Captain, England Wheelchair Rugby League. For services to Wheelchair Rugby League.
- Julie Harmsworth. Lately Deputy Chief Executive, Unlock, National Association of Ex-Offenders. For services to Ex-Offenders.
- Professor Jennifer Margaret Hartley. Co-Founder, Prison Reading Groups. For services to Prisoners.
- Paul Ragle Harvey. Fundraiser. For services to Charity and to People Living with Alzheimer's and Dementia.
- Tina Harvey. Executive Headteacher, Perseid School, London Borough of Merton. For services to Special Education.
- Elizabeth Noël Harwerth. Chair, UK Export Finance. For services to International Trade.
- Jeffrey Christopher Hayes. Trustee, St John's Foundation, Trustee, West Ham United Foundation and lately Trustee and Chair, Trust for London. For services to Charity and to the Voluntary Sector.
- Paula Maria Hay-Plumb. Independent Non-Executive Board Member, The Crown Estate. For services to the Public Sector.
- Varinder Hayre. District Crown Prosecutor, Crown Prosecution Service, London. For services to Law and Order.
- Steven Hemsley. Senior Officer, National Crime Agency. For services to Law Enforcement.
- Colin James Herring. Head of Employee Policy Team, Department for Work and Pensions. For services to the State Funeral of Her Majesty Queen Elizabeth II.
- Alfie Thomas Hewett. Wheelchair Tennis Player. For services to Tennis.
- Charlotte Heyes. Chief Negotiator and Deputy Director, Trade Negotiations Group, Department for Business and Trade. For services to International Trade.
- Rebecca Joanne Hickey. Assistant Director, Harris Federation and Principal, Harris Academy Beckenham, London Borough of Bromley. For services to Education.
- Professor Jane Katharine Hill, Hon. FRES. Professor of Ecology, University of York. For services to Conservation Ecology.
- Georgina Gay Hood. Founder and Principal, Paint Pots Montessori Schools Ltd. For services to Early Years Education and to the community in London.
- Clare Howard. Chief Executive Officer, Natspec. For services to Children and Young People with Special Educational Needs and Disabilities.
- Professor Louise Michele Howard. Professor Emerita of Women's Mental Health, King's College London. For services to Women's Mental Health.
- Stephen Glyn Hughes. Chief Executive Officer, Education Impact Academy Trust, Birmingham, West Midlands. For services to Children and Young People with Special Educational Needs and Disabilities.
- Juliet Hughes-Hallett. Founder and Honorary President, Smart Works Charity. For services to Unemployed Women.
- Michael Hulls. Lighting Designer. For services to Dance and to the Arts.
- Dr. Garry Edward Hunt. Professor and Research Scientist. For services to Space Science and Business.
- Jacqueline Leigh Hunt. Member, Culture Recovery Board and Trustee, British Film Institute. For services to the Arts.
- Ishtiaq Hussain. Assistant Director, Department for Levelling Up, Housing and Communities. For Public Service.
- Janine Mireille Irons, MBE. Co-Founder and Chief Executive, Tomorrow's Warriors. For services to the Music Industry.
- Thomas Neill Jackson. Head of Executive Services, The Executive Office, Northern Ireland Executive. For services to the State Funeral of Her Majesty Queen Elizabeth II.
- Lisa Juliet James. Community Outreach, Ukraine Humanitarian Taskforce, Department for Levelling Up, Housing and Communities. For services to the Ukrainian Community.
- Christopher John Jenkins. Lately Chief Executive Officer, Commonwealth Games Wales. For services to the Commonwealth Games and to Sport in Wales.
- Alexandra Claire Johnson. Co-Founder, Duchenne UK, Co-Founder, Joining Jack and lately Board Member, World Duchenne Organisation. For services to Charity and to People with Duchenne Muscular Dystrophy.
- Shirley Jones. Inspector, Department of Education Northern Ireland. For services to Education, Training and Safeguarding Young People and Adults at Risk.
- Neil Arthur Kermode. Managing Director, European Marine Energy Centre. For services to Renewable Energy and to the community in Orkney.
- Derek Irwin Keys. Founder, Euro Auctions. For services to the Economy.
- Dr. Kavitha Kishen. Deputy Director, Security, Resilience and Strategy, Government Office for Science. For services to National Resilience and Diversity in Government Science and Engineering.
- Dr. Sarah Elizabeth Knight. Behavioural Scientist, Defence Science and Technology Laboratory, Ministry of Defence. For services to the State Funeral of Her Majesty Queen Elizabeth II.
- Anju Kumar. Consultant Obstetrician and Gynaecologist. For services to Women's Health and Welfare in Wales.
- Amar Latif. Founder and Chief Executive Officer, Traveleyes. For services to the Visually Impaired and to Entrepreneurship.
- Dr. Zoë Elena Leach. Lately Chief Executive Officer, National Pig Association. For services to the Pig Industry.
- Andrew Fraser Ledgerton-Lynch. Editor, Fire Magazine. For services to The Fire Fighters Charity and Fire Safety.
- Roy Andrew Ledgister. For services to Social Mobility.
- Janet Carole Lewis, MBE. Founder and Director, English Youth Ballet. For services to Dance.
- Dr. Peter Hammond Liddle. Founder, Liddle Collection, The University of Leeds, Patron, Halifax Great War Heritage Society and Life President, The Second World War Experience Centre. For services to Heritage and to Public Understanding of the World Wars.
- Debra Mary Livingstone, MVO. Head of Protocol and Honours, Scottish Government. For services in Scotland on the Demise of Her Majesty Queen Elizabeth II.
- Martin Lawrence Loat. Lately Chair, Equal Civil Partnerships Campaign. For services to Civil Partnerships.
- Hew Donald Joseph Locke. Artist. For services to Art.
- Matthew John Lodge. Director, Rail Infrastructure, Department for Transport. For services to the Rail Industry.
- Robert William Henderson Macgeachy. Chair, PEAK Scientific. For services to Manufacturing and Philanthropy.
- Dr. Miles Bradley Mack. Lately Chair, Academy of Medical Royal Colleges and Faculties in Scotland. For services to General Practice.
- Joan Ishbel Mackay. Head of Curriculum Innovation at Education Scotland. For services to Education in Scotland.
- Russell Scott Maliphant. Choreographer. For services to Dance.
- Professor Helen Jane Marshall. Vice-chancellor and Chief Executive Officer, University of Salford, Greater Manchester. For services to Higher Education.
- Roisin Theresa Marshall. Chief Executive Officer, Northern Ireland Council for Integrated Education. For services to Education and Community Reconciliation in Northern Ireland.
- Dr. Giles Francis Maskell. Consultant Clinical Radiologist, Royal Cornwall Hospitals NHS Trust. For services to Diagnostic Radiology.
- Georgina Alison May Masters. Assistant Director, HISP Multi-Academy Trust, Eastleigh, Hampshire. For services to Education.
- Chloe Kate Sevgi Kilcoyne Mawson. Clerk Assistant, House of Lords. For services to Parliament and to the State Funeral of Her Majesty Queen Elizabeth II.
- Anthony James May, DL. Lately Chief Executive, Nottinghamshire County Council. For services to Local Government.
- Elizabeth Anne McCleary. Lately Director, Social Security Policy and Legislation, Department for Communities, Northern Ireland Executive. For services to Social Security Policy and Legislation in Northern Ireland.
- Fiona Teresa McDonald. Principal, Drumnamoe Nursery School, Lurgan, County Armagh. For services to Education and voluntary and charitable service in Northern Ireland and Abroad.
- Fiona Mary McKenzie. Founder, Centrestage, Kilmarnock. For services to the community in East Ayrshire.
- Jennifer Gail McKibbin. Lately Director of EU Exit Operational Readiness, The Executive Office, Northern Ireland Executive. For services to EU Exit and Covid-19 Contingency Planning.
- Gavin Marcus McKinnon. Chief Officer, Kent Special Constabulary. For services to Policing.
- Professor Donald Campbell McMillan. Professor of Surgical Science, University of Glasgow. For services to Cancer Research.
- Claire Louise Merron. Deputy Head, Safety, Security and Business Resilience, Ministry of Defence. For services to the State Funeral of Her Majesty Queen Elizabeth II.
- Alan Keith Meyrick. Deputy Director, Teaching Regulation Agency. For services to Education.
- John Joseph Millward. Head, Inspections and Enforcement Division, Veterinary Medicines Directorate. For services to Animal Health and Welfare.
- Professor Nicola Jane Milner, FBA. Professor of Archaeology, University of York. For services to Archaeology.
- Alyson Mitchell. Lately Head of Ethical Digital National Team, Scottish Government. For services to Digital Inclusion.
- William Montgomery. Board Member, Agri-Food and Biosciences Institute and Belfast Metropolitan College. For services to the Northern Ireland Economy.
- Timothy Michael Morfin. Chief Executive Officer, Transforming Lives for Good. For services to Disadvantaged Children and Young People.
- Geoffrey Owen Morris. Director, Eden Campus, University of St. Andrews. For services to Charity and to the Environment.
- Colin Michael Morrow. Director, Procurement Operations, Crown Commercial Service, Cabinet Office. For Public Service.
- Paul Richard Mott. Head of Joint Extremism Unit, Home Office and HM Prison and Probation Service. For services to National Security.
- Sheila Murphy, MBE. Liverpool Officer, Labour Party. For Political and Voluntary Services.
- Barry Neilson. Chief Executive, Construction Industry Training Board Northern Ireland. For services to Economic Development.
- Professor John Norman Newton. Director of Public Health Analysis, Office for Health Improvement and Disparities, Department of Health and Social Care. For services to Public Health.
- Julia Elizabeth Nolan. Lately Deputy Director, International Climate Strategy, Department for Business, Energy and Industrial Strategy. For services to International Climate Diplomacy.
- Professor Joanne Victoria Elizabeth Norton (Jo Smith). Professor of Early Intervention and Psychosis, University of Worcester. For services to Higher Education and to Student Suicide Prevention and Response.
- Sean Joseph O'Callaghan. Police Leader, British Transport Police. For services to Policing and the State Funeral of Her Majesty Queen Elizabeth II.
- Jacqueline O'Donovan. Managing Director, O'Donovan Waste Disposal. For services to Recycling, to Safety and to Industry.
- Christopher Oglesby. Chief Executive Officer, Bruntwood. For services to Charity and to Regeneration in the North West of England.
- Peter Daniel Oliver. Trustee and Chair, Strategy and Delivery, UK Scouts. For services to Young People.
- Roland Alan Owers. Chief Executive, World Horse Welfare. For charitable services to Equine Welfare in the UK and Abroad.
- Christian William Papaleontiou. Head of Tackling Child Sexual Abuse Unit, Home Office. For services to Tackling Child Sexual Abuse and Exploitation.
- Dr. Navaratnam Partheeban. Co-Founder, British Veterinary Ethnicity and Diversity Society. For services to Inclusion.
- Richard Jeremy Paxman. Chief Executive Officer, Paxman Coolers Limited. For services to International Trade.
- Dr. Simon Robert Pender. Deputy Director, Cabinet Office. For services to National Security.
- Dr. Mark Antony Pilgrim. Lately Chief Executive, North of England Zoological Society (Chester Zoo). For services to Zoos and to Wildlife Conservation.
- Dr. Susan Pope. Forensic Scientist, Principal Forensic Services. For services to Forensic Science and to the Criminal Justice System.
- Gareth William Powell. Lately Chief Customer and Strategy Officer, Transport for London. For services to Transport and to the State Funeral of Her Majesty Queen Elizabeth II.
- Sunand Prasad, MBE. Chair, UK Green Building Council. For services to Regeneration.
- Patricia Pritchard. Chair, Fenland and East Cambridgeshire Opportunity Area. For services to Education and to Social Mobility in Fenland and East Cambridgeshire.
- Stuart Graham Proffitt. Editor and Publisher, Penguin. For services to Literature.
- Graham Quinn. Chief Executive Officer, New Bridge Multi Academy Trust, Oldham, Greater Manchester. For services to Children and Young People with Special Educational Needs and Disabilities.
- Dr. Amarjit Raju. Chief Executive, Disability Direct. For services to People with Disabilities, to Carers and to Mental Health.
- Charles Mottram Ramsden. Deputy Director, Government Equalities Office. For Public Service.
- Dr. Norma Victoria Raynes. Director, From Generation 2 Generation and Chair, Caldecott Festival Group. For services to Tackling Loneliness in Older People and to the community in Shropshire.
- Neil Andrew Redit. Senior Principal Engineer, Defence Science and Technology Laboratory, Ministry of Defence. For services to Defence.
- Gordon James Reid, MBE. Wheelchair Tennis Player. For services to Tennis.
- Emily Elisheva Renee Reuben. Co-Founder and Chief Executive, Duchenne UK. For services to Charity and to People with Duchenne Muscular Dystrophy.
- Professor Stuart Ian Rogers. Lately Marine Scientist, Cefas. For services to Marine Fisheries and Environmental Science.
- Michael Peter Rose. Joint Managing Director, Magic Light Pictures. For services to Animation.
- Dr. Edward Rowland. Lately Medical Director, St Bartholomew's Hospital, Barts Health NHS Trust. For services to Cardiology.
- Judith Rosemary Salinson. Lately President, Women in Advertising Communications London. For services to Advertising.
- Robert David Sanders. Director of Digital Customer Services, Houses of Parliament. For services to Parliament and to the State Funeral of Her Majesty Queen Elizabeth II.
- Jonathon Hugh Christopher Saxton (Joe Saxton). Founder, nfpSynergy, Founder, CharityComms and Chair, PTA UK/Parentkind. For services to the Charitable Sector.
- Douglas William Scarfe. Chief Executive Officer, Bournemouth Symphony Orchestra. For services to the Arts.
- Duncan Clinton Sharkey. Lately Chief Executive. Royal Borough of Windsor and Maidenhead. For services to the State Funeral of Her Majesty Queen Elizabeth II.
- Anne Catherine Shaw. Executive Director, Transport for West Midlands. For services to the Commonwealth Games 2022.
- Mark Thomas Sheridan. Deputy Director, HM Revenue and Customs Fraud Investigation Service. For services to Combatting Fiscal Fraud and to Staff Mentoring.
- Ryan Daniel Sinclair. Assistant Head, Department for Business and Trade. For services to Defence and Security Exports to Ukraine.
- Michelle Prudencear Skeer, QPM. Chief Constable, Cumbria Police. For services to Policing.
- David William Smith. Founder, Women in Games and Founder, BAME in Games. For services to the Video Game Industry and to Diversity.
- Howard Geoffrey Smith. Director of the Elizabeth Line, Transport for London. For services to Rail Transport in London.
- Dr. Jenifer Ann Evelyn Smith. Lately Deputy Medical Director, Public Health England. For services to Sport during Covid-19.
- Nicola Jayne Smith. Governor, HM Prison Risley. For services to HM Prison and Probation Service.
- Susan Catherine Soroczan. Group Director, Department for Work and Pensions. For Public Service.
- Ingrid Marika Sarah Southworth. Lately Director, International Affairs, Cabinet Office. For Public Service, particularly for services to British Foreign Policy.
- Nicky Spence. Operatic Tenor. For services to Music.
- Philip Spence. Chief Operating Officer, The British Library. For services to Libraries.
- Jennifer Naomi Spencer-Plews. Chief Executive Officer, Northern Star Academies Trust, Yorkshire. For services to Education.
- Professor Stephen George Spiro. Vice-President and lately Chair, Rennie Grove Hospice Care. For services to Hospice Care.
- Stuart James Sterling. Deputy Director, Major Events Directorate, Cabinet Office. For services to the State Funeral of Her Majesty Queen Elizabeth II.
- Philippa Ruth Stobbs. Lately Assistant Director, Council for Disabled Children. For services to Disabled Children.
- Andrew John Stokes. Director, Visit England. For services to Tourism.
- Sarah Louise Strangleman. Liaison Officer, Defence Science and Technology Laboratory, Ministry of Defence. For Public Service.
- Michael Straughan. For services to the British Automotive Industry.
- Dr. Rex Strong. Head of Regulatory Integration, Sellafield Ltd. For services to the Civil Nuclear Industry.
- Thomas Richard Stephen Peregrine Stuart-Smith. Garden and Landscape Designer. For services to Landscape Design.
- Reverend Dr. Richard John Sudworth. Secretary, Inter Religious Affairs and National Inter Religious Affairs Adviser, Church of England. For services to Interfaith and Cohesion.
- Jane Susan Sweeney. Head of Programme Management, Delivery and Challenge, HM Treasury. For Public Service.
- Kevin Brendan Taylor. Chair, Industrial Development Advisory Board. For services to Business and to the Economy.
- Sharon Jane Tennant. Lately Principal, Sandelford Special School, Coleraine. For services to Education in Northern Ireland.
- Professor Rama Thirunamachandran, DL. Vice-chancellor, Canterbury Christ Church University, Canterbury, Kent. For services to Higher Education.
- Dr. Carol Lee Tozer. Lately Director, Adult Social Services, Isle of Wight Council and Trustee, Association of Directors of Adult Social Services. For services to Social Care.
- Anne Margaret Turner. Director of Children's Safeguarding and Social Work, London Borough of Camden. For services to Children's Social Work.
- Sarah Catherine Turvey. Co-Founder, Prisons Reading Groups. For services to Prisoners.
- Christian Cyril van Der Nest. Resilience and Partnership Lead, Transport for London. For services to the State Funeral of Her Majesty Queen Elizabeth II.
- Linda Ventress. Lately Cluster Manager North East and Regional Estates and Strategy Manager, HM Courts and Tribunals Service. For services to the Administration of Justice.
- John Stanley Vice. Lately Editor of Debates, House of Lords. For services to Parliament.
- Dr. Martin Austin Walsh. Deputy Director of Life Sciences, Diamond Light Source. For services to Science during Covid-19.
- Mohammad Amjid Wazir. Member and Deputy Leader, Stoke-on-Trent City Council. For Political Service and to the community in Stoke-on-Trent.
- Caron Melina Wheeler. Singer, Songwriter, Record Producer and Musician. For services to Music.
- Heather Kay Wheeler, MP. Member of Parliament for South Derbyshire. For Political and Public Service.
- Professor Timothy John Whitley. Managing Director, Applied Research, BT. For services to Communications Technologies and Scientific Policy.
- Reverend Dr. George James Whyte. Lately Principal Clerk, General Assembly of the Church of Scotland. For services to Faith Communities.
- Professor Graham Richard Williams. President, European Thyroid Association. For services to Endocrinology.
- Simon Richard Williams. Director, National Care and Health Improvement Programme. For services to Care.
- Denis Edmond Woulfe, MBE. Co-Chair, Leaders as Change Agent Board. For services to Business and to Equality.
- Ian Edward Wright, MBE. Broadcaster and Author. For services to Association Football and Charity.
- Mohammed Younis. Owner, Star Day Nurseries, Peterborough, Cambridgeshire. For services to Early Years Education and to the community in Peterborough.

==== Member of the Order of the British Empire (MBE) ====
Military

- Lieutenant Zachariah Thomas Sidney Blow, Royal Navy, 30073650.
- Warrant Officer Class 1 Andrew Charles Cornish, Royal Marines, P037162T.
- Petty Officer (Diver) Andrew Robert Coulson, Royal Navy, D227346K.
- Warrant Officer Class 1 (Mine Warfare) John Cowan, Royal Navy, D240448Q.
- Sub Lieutenant Adaiah Jekamiah Pelailiah Providence Culzac, Royal Naval Reserve, 30282217.
- Warrant Officer Class 2 Engineering Technician (Marine Engineering) Jamie Paul Dougal, Royal Navy, D239732L.
- Sergeant James Dunlop, Royal Marines, P066009C.
- Chief Petty Officer (Royal Navy Welfare) Victoria Glassey, Royal Navy, W148727N.
- Lieutenant Commander Amy Glover, Royal Navy, 30008841.
- Lieutenant Commander Anthony James Rodney Lofts, Royal Navy, 30017213.
- Petty Officer Engineering Technician (Weapon Engineering Submarines) Barry John Turner MacDonald, Royal Navy, D252123D.
- Captain Richard Ian Watson, Royal Marines, N029185A.
- Major Christopher Alan Webber, Royal Marines, 30064654.
- Captain Steven John Adamson, Royal Corps of Signals, 25106171.
- Lieutenant Colonel (now Acting Colonel) Stuart Richard Allen, Adjutant General’s Corps (Educational and Training Service Branch), 555343.
- Major Daniel Robert Austin, Royal Army Medical Corps, 25041196.
- Sergeant Liam James Bamford, Royal Corps of Signals, 30144379.
- Warrant Officer Class 1 Robbie George Beech, Queen Alexandra’s Royal Army Nursing Corps, 25105667.
- Lieutenant Colonel James Leonard Brown, The Royal Logistic Corps, 549475.
- Lieutenant Colonel Rosanne Kathleen Buckley, Intelligence Corps, 552156.
- Major (now Acting Lieutenant Colonel) Christopher Paul Carter, The Duke of Lancaster’s Regiment, 555097.
- Major Peter James Cornish, The Royal Logistic Corps, 565695.
- Sergeant Thomas Couper, The Royal Regiment of Scotland, 30107952.
- Colonel Peter Michael John Cowell, The Yorkshire Regiment, 545525.
- Major Hamish Lawson Davison, Royal Tank Regiment, 25232059.
- Lance Corporal Natasha Maria Linda Day, Royal Army Medical Corps, 30208522.
- Major Steven George Day, The Yorkshire Regiment, 25185379.
- Warrant Officer Class 1 Deborah Anne Fairclough, Adjutant General’s Corps (Staff and Personnel Support Branch), W0807155.
- Lieutenant Colonel Wendy Faux, V.R., Royal Regiment of Artillery, Army Reserve, 538806.
- Major Paul John Ganuszko, Royal Regiment of Artillery, 556359.
- Lieutenant Colonel Benjamin Gareth Russel Hall, Royal Army Medical Corps, 30047573.
- Captain Melissa Jane Henley, Adjutant General’s Corps (Royal Military Police), W1034319.
- Major Craig Hutton, Scots Guards, 24797517.
- Captain Helen Jasper, V.R., Royal Regiment of Artillery, Army Reserve, 555195.
- Lieutenant Colonel (now Acting Colonel) Iain Lamont, Corps of Royal Engineers, 553017.
- Lieutenant Colonel Danny Scott Alan Leslie, Corps of Royal Electrical and Mechanical Engineers, 558180.
- Captain (now Acting Major) George Wayne Long, The Mercian Regiment, 25039762.
- Lieutenant (now Acting Captain) Bartholomew Philip Lucas, Army Cadet Force, 528432.
- Major Robert Marshall, The Royal Logistic Corps, 24688268.
- Major Iain Veitch McDavid, Corps of Royal Electrical and Mechanical Engineers, 24815221.
- Captain (now Acting Major) Matthew Speirs McNairn, The Royal Logistic Corps, Army Reserve, 553968.
- Major Robert Edward Morford, The Royal Gurkha Rifles, 25229107.
- Major Harry Anthony Noble, Intelligence Corps, 25214760.
- Major William James Devine Patrick, The Royal Gurkha Rifles, 30105693.
- Warrant Officer Class 2 Deborah Christine Penny, The Royal Logistic Corps, Army Reserve, 30118277.
- Warrant Officer Class 2 James Stephen Christopher Rochester, Corps of Royal Engineers, 25135103.
- Corporal William James Ross, The Royal Logistic Corps, 30154278.
- Warrant Officer Class 1 Abbas Salihu, The Royal Logistic Corps, 25164948.
- Major Keith William Scott, Adjutant General’s Corps (Royal Military Police), 548005.
- Major Helen Mary Morrell Stamp, Corps of Royal Engineers, 565371.
- Warrant Officer Class 2 Johannes Jakobus Du Toit, The Royal Logistic Corps, 25168501.
- Major Anthony Russell Viny, The Yorkshire Regiment, 556825. Major Edward Charles Watts, The Yorkshire Regiment, 30143965.
- Major (now Acting Lieutenant Colonel) Joseph Francis Caven Wood, Corps of Royal Engineers, 563713.
- Sergeant (now Acting Flight Sergeant) Robyn Caroline Muscroft-Bloomfield, Royal Air Force, 30004078.
- Sergeant Matthew James Breese, Royal Air Force, R8506760.
- Squadron Leader David Gary Cooper, Royal Air Force, 8028812B.
- Warrant Officer Andrea Jane Culley, Royal Air Force, R8241331.
- Chief Technician Martin Richard Darbon, Royal Air Force, S8446978.
- Squadron Leader Elizabeth Margaret Dawson, Royal Air Force, 8307855Q.
- Squadron Leader Brendan Christopher Dunne, Royal Air Force, 30003837.
- Squadron Leader Robyn Elizabeth Hackwell, Royal Air Force, F8704197.
- Wing Commander Lorna Jayne Hoban, Royal Air Force, 306439V.
- Air Specialist 1 (now Acting Corporal) Prem Dorje Lama, Royal Air Force, 30246584.
- Squadron Leader William Anthony Leather, Royal Air Force, D211099C.
- Sergeant Paul David Mitchell, Royal Air Force, H8436973.
- Squadron Leader Gary Montgomery, Royal Air Force, 8703385B.
- Squadron Leader Andrew Spour, Royal Air Force, 30000035.
- Flight Lieutenant David Alexander Taylor, Royal Air Force, 30039977.
- Squadron Leader Princejit Singh Uubhi, Royal Air Force, X8703821.

Civil

- Julia Elizabeth Adamson. Managing Director, Education and Public Benefit, BCS, The Chartered Institute for IT. For services to Education.
- Professor Pascale Veronique Aebischer. Professor, Shakespeare and Early Modern Performance Studies, University of Exeter. For services to Economic and Societal Resilience during Covid-19.
- George Gray Alexander. Lately Member, Moray Council. For services to the community in Forres, Moray.
- Peter Frank Allam. Lately Chief Executive, Weymouth and Portland National Sailing Academy. For services to Sailing.
- Eniola Aluko. For services to Association Football and Charity.
- Darnish Amraz. Youth Worker, Birmingham City Youth Service. For services to Young People in Birmingham.
- Carol Ann Anderson. Director, Trustee Savings Bank. For services to the Banking and Financial Services Sector.
- Ewan David Anderson. Superintendent, Police Service of Northern Ireland. For services to Law and Order.
- Muhammad Arif Anis. Co-Founder, One Million Meals. For services to Frontline Workers during Covid-19.
- Lisa Karen Ashford. Director and Chief Executive Officer, Ethex. For services to Impact Investment.
- Rachael Joanna Atkins. Deputy Head, Strategy and Protocol Team, Constitution and Major Events Directorate, and lately Deputy Head, Venue Security and Transport, COP26, Cabinet Office. For services to COP26 and to the State Funeral of Her Majesty Queen Elizabeth II.
- Richard Norman Auty. Lately Inspector, Metropolitan Police Service. For services to Forensic Collision Investigation.
- Hilda Bailey. Team Leader, Ministry of Defence. For services to Defence.
- Norma Baillie. Founder and Operations Manager, PrioritEyes Ltd. For services to Blind and Partially Sighted People.
- David Alfred Baker. Foster Carer, Plymouth City Council. For services to Children.
- Susannah Jane Baker. Co-Founder, The Pickwell Foundation. For services to Ukrainian Refugees.
- Vivienne Patricia Baker. Foster Carer, Plymouth City Council. For services to Children.
- Euan Andrew Barker. Royal and Ceremonial Planning Manager, Scottish Government. For services in Scotland on the Demise of Her Majesty Queen Elizabeth II.
- Jane Margaret Barker. Founder, Perry Riding for the Disabled Group and the Cavalier Centre. For services to Charity and to People with Disabilities.
- Dr. Jessica Lucy Barker. Co-Founder and Joint Chief Executive Officer, Cygenta. For services to Cyber Security.
- Richard Barley. Director of Gardens, Royal Botanic Gardens Kew. For services to Horticulture.
- William Barnes. Governor, St Cuthbert's Catholic Primary School, Newcastle-upon-Tyne. For services to Education and to the community in Newcastle-Upon-Tyne.
- Dr. Richard Maxwell Barrett. Founder, Daventry Contact and Spencer Contact. For services to the Environment and to the community in Northamptonshire.
- John Livesey Hender Bate. For services to the Talyllyn Railway, Wales.
- Marjorie Elaine Baylis. Deputy Regional Chair, Membership, Conservative Party South West. For Political Service.
- Sebastien Joseph Bechara. For services to Wheelchair Rugby League.
- John Charles Bennett. Group Scout Leader, Wistaston Scout Group. For services to Young People in Cheshire.
- Matteo Giulio Livio Bergamini. Founder and Chief Executive Officer, Shout Out UK. For services to Charity, to Social Enterprise and to Education.
- David Lambert Berry. Volunteer, The Duke of Edinburgh's Award. For services to Young People and to the community in the Wirral.
- Claire Joanne Bessant. Lately Chief Executive Officer, International Cat Care. For services to Cat Welfare.
- Roma Bhopal. Physiotherapist and Specialist Hand Therapist. For services to Physiotherapy.
- Deborah Jayne Blackburn. Assistant Principal, Finance, Aquinas College, Stockport, Greater Manchester. For services to Further Education.
- Nicholas John Blackburn. Chief Executive Officer, Lingfield Education Trust, Darlington, County Durham. For services to Education.
- Colin Francis Bland. Chief Executive Officer, Sporting Chance. For services to Sport.
- Fiona Elizabeth Blyth. Lately Deputy Head, Russia Ukraine Team, Cabinet Office. For Public Service.
- Deborah Jane Boden. World Heritage Site Coordinator, Cornwall and West Devon Mining Landscape World Heritage Site. For services to Heritage.
- James Robert Bolton. For services to Charity in Rutland.
- Jean Frances Bonnick, JP. Magistrate, Supplemental List and Vice President, Norfolk Magistrates' Association. For services to the Administration of Justice.
- Marie Boyce. Customer Services Manager, Department for Work and Pensions. For services to Business Transformation.
- Iain Patrick Wentworth Boyd. Lately Chair and Trustee, Society for the Protection of Ancient Buildings. For services to Heritage.
- Paul Boyd. Founder and Director, Morningside School of Music, Edinburgh. For services to Entrepreneurship and to the Music Industry.
- Prudence Bray. Chair, Association of Liberal Democrat Councillors and Campaigners. For Political Service.
- Mark Julian Bretton, TD. For services to Business, the Economy and to Charity, particularly during Covid-19.
- Caroline Sandra Brewster. Programme Management Office Lead, HM Revenue and Customs. For Public and Charitable Services.
- Rosemarie Brim. Manager, Prime Minister's Office. For Public Service.
- Simon Andrew Broadhurst. Detective Inspector, Police Service of Scotland. For services to Policing.
- James Reginald Brockman. For services to Bookbinding.
- Erika Elaine Brodnock. Entrepreneur. For services to Diversity in the Technology Sector.
- Vanita Brookes. Fellow, Faculty of Dental Surgery, Royal College of Surgeons of England. For services to the Oral Health of People with Disabilities.
- Geoffrey Brown. Managing Director, Ripon Farm Services. For services to the Rural Economy.
- William Eric Brown. Lately Museums National Security Adviser. For services to Museums and to the Arts.
- Gareth Boswell Browning. Beat Forester, Forestry England. For services to Forestry and Nature Recovery.
- Kenneth Robertson Bruce. Broadcaster. For services to Radio, Autism Awareness and Charity.
- Michael Buckland. Lifeboat Operations Manager and Helm, Weston-Super-Mare Lifeboat Station, Royal National Lifeboat Institution. For services to Maritime Safety.
- Margaret Mary Bull. Governor, Mandeville School, Aylesbury, Buckinghamshire. For services to Education.
- Christopher Robert Burghes. Trustee, NHS Charities Together. For services to the NHS.
- Malcolm Roger Burnell. Founder, It's My Shout Productions. For services to the Creative Industries in Bridgend, Mid Glamorgan.
- Nicola Anne Butler. Chief Executive Officer, Young K&C, Royal Borough of Kensington and Chelsea. For services to the Play Sector.
- Delia Alexandra Button. For services to the community in Leamington Spa, Warwickshire.
- Carroll Carson Buxton. Deputy Chief Executive, Highlands and Islands Enterprise. For services to Economic Development in the Highlands and Islands of Scotland.
- Mary Elizabeth Byatt, DL. For services to Education, to the Arts and to Charity in Moray.
- Lorna Lynn Canning. Senior Policy Adviser, Home Office. For Public Service.
- Emma Rose Cantrell. Founder and Chief Executive Officer, First Days Children's Charity. For services to Children and Vulnerable People in Wokingham, Berkshire.
- Angela Devonte Caroo. Head, Physical Security Compliance, Barclays UK. For services to the community in the London Borough of Newham.
- Raymond Stephen Carroll, BEM. Transport Manager, Northern Ireland Office. For services in Northern Ireland on the Demise of Her Majesty Queen Elizabeth II.
- Gillian Karen Carver. Headteacher, St Ann's School, Hanwell, London Borough of Ealing. For services to Education.
- Philip Julian Castang. Chair, UK Music Education Council. For services to Music Education.
- Siena Castellon. Neurodiversity Advocate. For services to Neurodiversity Acceptance, Equality and Inclusion.
- Ann Chalmers. Chief Executive, Child Bereavement UK. For services to Bereaved Children, Young People, Parents and Families.
- Rosalyn Carol Chalmers. For services to the Arts and to People with Sensory Impairments.
- Yui Chit Daniel Chan. Honorary Treasurer and Trustee, UK Youth. For services to Charity and to Young People.
- Nicola Jane Chance Thompson, DL. Chief Executive, Piece Hall Trust. For services to Culture and to Heritage.
- Fiona Susan Channon. Deputy Yeoman Usher, House of Lords. For services to Parliament and to the State Funeral of Her Majesty Queen Elizabeth II.
- Teresa Chaytor. Artistic Director, TIN Arts. For services to the Performing Arts for People with Learning Disabilities.
- John Child. Lately Managing Director, Sandcastle Waterpark. For services to Tourism, to People with Disabilities and to the community in Blackpool, Lancashire.
- Margaret Jean Christensen. Commercial Adviser, Department for Culture, Media and Sport. For Public Service.
- Hayley Karen Citrine. Lately Chief Nurse North West, NHS England. For services to Nursing.
- Lorna Shireen Paterson Clayton. Founder, ACTS Educational Charity and Academic Families. For services to Young People.
- Tania Natasha Cohen. Chief Executive, 360Giving. For services to Charity and Social Justice.
- Dr. Razvan Ungureanu Constantinescu. Founder, From Bristol with Love for Ukraine. For voluntary services to the People of Ukraine.
- Monica Mary Cooney. Head of Control Centre Operations, Transport for London. For services to Transport and to the State Funeral of Her Majesty Queen Elizabeth II.
- Anthony Philip Cooper. Volunteer, The Royal British Legion. For voluntary services to Veterans.
- Professor David Alan Cooper. For services to Lift and Escalator Engineering.
- Susan Margaret Copeland. Regional Chair and Trustee, East of England National Garden Scheme. For services to Heritage and to Charity.
- Peter Andrew Corry. For services to Music and to the Arts in Northern Ireland.
- Catherine Diana Courtney. Project Director, Artists' Lives, British Library. For services to Oral History.
- Sara Louise Cox. Referee. For services to Rugby Union.
- Thomas Dillon Coyd. Coach, England Wheelchair Rugby League Team. For services to Wheelchair Rugby League.
- Ronan Gerard Cregan. For services to Local Government and to Regeneration in Belfast.
- Helena June Rachel Croft. Founder and Chief Executive Officer, Streetlight UK. For services to the Eradication of Modern Day Slavery.
- Sara Joanne Crookdake. Assistant Chief Executive, Disability Stockport. For services to Disabled People in North West England.
- Jennifer Anne Cross, JP. Lately Member, Mental Health and Care Standards Tribunals. For services to the Administration of Justice and to the community in Tunbridge Wells, Kent.
- Tara Jane Cullen. Operations Lead, Members Services Team, House of Commons. For services to Parliament and to the State Funeral of Her Majesty Queen Elizabeth II.
- Pauline Culley. Association Chair, Darlington and Sedgefield Conservatives. For Political Service.
- Samuel Matthew Curran. For services to Cricket.
- Catherine Daley. Lately Constable, British Transport Police. For services to Law and Order.
- Nizamuddin Noordin Damani. Consultant Microbiologist, Southern Health and Social Care Trust. For services to Infection Prevention and Control in Northern Ireland and to the World Health Organisation.
- Andrew James Daniels. Foster Carer, Credo Care. For services to Children with Disabilities.
- Frances Elizabeth Davies. Manager, Totally Different Playscheme, Bushey, Hertfordshire. For services to Children and Young People with Special Educational Needs.
- Rhiannon Louise Davies. Campaigner, Maternity Services, Shrewsbury and Telford Hospital NHS Trust. For services to Maternity Healthcare.
- Michel Jean Dearman. Honorary Vice President, Wooden Spoon Yorkshire Region. For charitable services to Young People.
- Brenda Rivera Agon Deocampo. Ward Manager, Acute Medicine, Imperial College Healthcare NHS Trust. For services to Nursing.
- Anna Marta Dezyk (Hanya Dezky). Deputy Chair, Association of Ukrainians in Great Britain. For services to Ukrainian Refugees.
- Bawa Singh Dhallu. Lately Councillor and Mayor, Sandwell Metropolitan Borough Council, West Midlands. For Political and Voluntary Service.
- Professor Philip Michael Dickens. Founder, Added Scientific. For services to the Additive Manufacturing Sector.
- Séan Joseph Dillon. Principal, Primate Dixon Primary School, Coalisland, County Tyrone. For services to Education in Northern Ireland.
- Delyth Eirian Done. Head of School, School of Materials and Design, Hereford College of Arts. For services to Blacksmithing and to Heritage Crafts.
- Sandeep Dwesar. Chief Operating and Financial Officer, Barbican Centre. For Public Service in the City of London.
- Susan Dzendzera. Lately Chief Executive Officer, Gingerbread Corner. For services to Children and to the community in the London Borough of Croydon.
- Gillian Pearl Eaton. Director, Sporting Futures Training, Stevenage, Hertfordshire. For services to Further Education and Skills.
- Mary Edmiston. Payment Services Operations Manager, Student Loans Company. For services to Education and to Charity.
- Inua Muhammed Ellams. Poet, Playwright and Performer. For services to the Arts.
- Theresa Mary Ellerby. Director, The Children's House, Stallingborough, North East Lincolnshire. For services to Education.
- Dr. Niall William Andrew Elliott. Head of Sports Medicine, sportscotland Institute of Sport and Chief Medical Officer, British Olympic Association. For services to Sports and Exercise Medicine.
- Winston George Ellis. Ambassador, BAME Health Collaborative. For charitable services to Ethnic Minority communities.
- Paul Stuart Ethell. HR Director, BAE Systems Submarines. For services to the Defence Industry and to the community in Barrow-in-Furness, Cumbria.
- Caroline Evans. Headteacher, Parks Primary School, Leicester. For services to Education.
- Jonathan Grant Evans. For services to Association Football in Northern Ireland.
- David Anthony Eyre. Manager, Building Services and Ceremonial Works, House of Commons. For services to Parliament and to the State Funeral of Her Majesty Queen Elizabeth II.
- Mohammed Fahim. For services to the community in Walsall, West Midlands, particularly during Covid-19.
- Aqil Farooq. Police Sergeant and Chair, Staff Association, Avon and Somerset Police. For services to Policing and to Diversity and Inclusion.
- Karen Jane Farr. Children and Young Persons Manager, Hampshire and the Isle of Wight Fire and Rescue Service. For services to Young People and to Public Safety.
- Amy Elizabeth Fearn. Referee. For services to Association Football.
- Professor Ruth Fee. Professor, Public Services Education, Ulster University. For Public Service and to Higher Education in Northern Ireland.
- Lynn Marie Fell. Senior Operations Manager, Work and Health, Department for Work and Pensions. For Public Service.
- Lynn Fidler. Ceremonials Team, Department for Culture, Media and Sport. For Public Service.
- Kate Fisher-Stevens. Deputy Director, National Crime Agency. For services to Law Enforcement.
- Nicola Jean Fleury. Managing Director, Kidzrus Nursery Group, Salford, Greater Manchester. For services to Early Years Education and to the community in Salford, Greater Manchester.
- Wendy Jacqueline Forrester. Philanthropist and Founder, Forrester Family Trust. For services to Charity.
- Stephen William Franey. Technical Staff Development Manager, King's College London. For services to Technical Staff in Research and Education.
- Angela Maddalyna Frazer-Wicks. Chair, Family Rights Group. For services to Children and Families.
- Eileen Mary French. Founder Trustee, Essex Council of Voluntary Youth Organisations. For services to Young People in Essex.
- Emma Elizabeth Fry (Emma Bristow). For services to Motor Sports and Women in Sport.
- John Fyffe. For services to Education and to Young People in Scotland.
- Pauline Marie Gamester. Founder, Connector Media Community Interest Company and Co-Founder and Director, The Sewing Room. For services to Social Enterprise and to the community in Lancashire.
- Janice Rosanne Gault. Chief Executive, Northern Ireland Hotels Federation. For services to Tourism and Hospitality.
- Rosamund Jane Gentle. For voluntary service to Children with Special Needs and their Families in West Sussex.
- Diana Judith Gerald. Chief Executive Officer, Book Trust. For services to Reading and Children's Literature.
- Michael Frederick Gibbons. Commissioner Operations, St John Ambulance. For Voluntary Service.
- Mary Gillespie. People and Capability Team, HM Treasury. For services to People with Disabilities.
- Sarah Na-Lamle Godwin Lamptey. Founder, ShowerBox. For services to Homeless People.
- Dr. Alice Karen Good. Founder, Sunflower Sisters. For services to Ukrainian Refugees.
- Mark Andrew Goodway. Founder and Chief Executive, The Matthew Tree Project Charity. For services to Charity and to Disadvantaged People.
- Jon-Paul Graham. Head of City Operations, Greater London Authority. For services to the State Funeral of Her Majesty Queen Elizabeth II.
- William Gerald Gray. Chairman, Royal Highland and Agricultural Society of Scotland. For services to Agriculture, to Charity and to the community in Scotland.
- Sarah Greenhalgh (Sarah Smith). Chair, Tobacco Factory Theatres. For services to Theatre and to the community in Bristol and Cornwall.
- Luke Peter Grenfell-Shaw. Cancer Activist and Cyclist, Founder, Bristol2Beijing. For services to Charitable Fundraising for People with Cancer.
- Colin James Griffiths. Campaigner, Maternity Services, Shrewsbury and Telford Hospital NHS Trust. For services to Maternity Healthcare.
- Jacqueline Amanda Griffiths. Senior Policy Adviser, Department for Business and Trade. For Public Service.
- John Parry Griffiths. Coach, British Canoeing. For services to Canoeing and Paddlesport.
- Kayleigh Rhianon Griffiths. Campaigner, Maternity Services, Shrewsbury and Telford Hospital NHS Trust. For services to Maternity Healthcare.
- Rhiannon Mair Griffiths. Co-Founder and Managing Director, Comics Youth. For services to Young People.
- Nigel Sylvester Guy. Director, Windrush Generations UK. For services to the Windrush Generation.
- Lynne Haines. Headteacher, Greenvale School, London Borough of Lewisham. For services to Children and Young People with Special Educational Needs.
- Lindsey Victoria Hall. Chief Executive Officer, Real Ideas Organisation. For services to Social Enterprise and to the community in Cornwall and Plymouth.
- Thomas Kingsley Hall. Welfare Support Officer, BLESMA. For services to Veterans in Wales.
- William Andrew Hall, MC. Head of Testing, Exercising and Activation Team, Cabinet Office. For services to the State Funeral of Her Majesty Queen Elizabeth II.
- Stephen Philip Hallam. Lately Managing Director, Ye Olde Pork Pie Shoppe, Melton Mowbray. For services to the Baking Industry and to the community in Leicestershire and Lincolnshire.
- Caroline Marie Hamilton. Chief Executive, Safety Assessment Federation. For services to Business and to Engineering.
- Elaine Hammans. Lately Head of Early Years, Southend City Council, Essex. For services to Education.
- Dr. Stewart John Harding. Lately Co-Founder, Parks Agency and Director, GreenSpace. For services to Heritage and Park Conservation.
- Jennifer Anne Hardy. Campaigner and Founder, Cancer Card. For services to Cancer Support.
- Andrea Harford. Lately Work Coach Team Leader, Department for Work and Pensions. For services to People with Autism.
- Robert Harper. Volunteer, Belfast Lough Sailability. For services to Sailing for People with Disabilities in Northern Ireland.
- Kathryn Ann Harper-Quinn. Headteacher, Hounslow Heath Infant and Nursery School, London Borough of Hounslow. For services to Education.
- Dr. Victoria Louise Harrington. Lately Assistant Chief Officer, Essex Police. For services to Policing.
- Mary Rosaleen Harrison. Headteacher, St Francis Catholic Primary School, Morley, Leeds. For services to Education.
- Dr. Tanya Olivia Harrod. Art Historian. For services to the Crafts.
- Emma Louise Hart. Deputy Head, Engagement and Protocol and lately Chief Media Operations and Events Officer, COP26 Unit, Cabinet Office. For services to COP26 and to the State Funeral of Her Majesty Queen Elizabeth II.
- Peter Hart. District Executive Committee Member, Wigan and District Scout Council. For services to Young People in Greater Manchester.
- Nigel Alan Hartley. Chief Executive Officer, Mountbatten Hospice Group, Isle of Wight and Hampshire. For services to Hospice Care.
- Valerie Margaret Hawkins. Chief Executive Officer, Mid Wales Tourism. For services to Tourism and to the Economy in Wales.
- Dr. Andrew Paul Haynes. Lately Specialist Adviser to the Board, Sherwood Forest NHS Foundation Trust and Non-Executive Director, University Hospitals Leicester NHS Trust. For services to Health and to the NHS in Nottinghamshire and Leicestershire.
- Aaron Lee Hearne. Fundraiser, Childline. For services to Children.
- David Ian Heaton. Facilities Manager, Prime Minister's Office. For Public and Voluntary Service.
- Diane Gillian Heighes. Government Banking Industry Lead, HM Revenue and Customs. For services to the State Funeral of Her Majesty Queen Elizabeth II.
- Claude Livingston Hendrickson. For services to Community Self-Build Housing.
- Ian Scott Henry. Group Director, Henry Brothers Ltd. For services to the Economy and to Charity in Northern Ireland.
- Robin Matthew Herringshaw. Head of Resilience, National Highways. For services to the State Funeral of Her Majesty Queen Elizabeth II.
- Kevin Hewlett. Managing Director and Registered Manager, Hale Place Care Homes Ltd. For services to People with Dementia.
- Susan Penelope Hewson-Lowe. Founder and Director, Bodywise UK. For services to Women's Health and to the Environment.
- David William Heyburn. Head of Operations Microbiology and Health Protection, Public Health Wales. For services to the NHS.
- Keith Robert Hill. For services to Education and to Disadvantaged Children.
- Professor Jane Elizabeth Hillston, FRS. Professor, Quantitative Modelling, University of Edinburgh. For services to Computer Science and to Women in Science.
- Ronald Hines. Lately Non-Executive Director, Scottish Government. For Public Service.
- Fiona Jane Hoban. Assistant Remembrancer (Ceremonial), Guildhall, City of London. For services to the City of London and to the State Funeral of HM Queen Elizabeth II.
- Zoe Branka Holland. For Charitable Service, particularly during Covid-19.
- Michaela Anne Hollywood. For services to People with Disabilities.
- Dr. Arlene Victoria Holmes Henderson. Associate Professor of Classics and Ancient History, Durham University. For services to Education.
- Jonathan Holt. Lately Head, Customs Process Owner Project Management Office, HM Revenue and Customs. For Public Service and services to Neurodiversity Awareness.
- Lawrence George Langford Honeysett. Head of Financial Scrutiny, Committee Office, House of Commons. For services to Parliament.
- Edward Hosking. Team Leader, Ministry of Defence. For services to Defence.
- Professor Rachid Hourizi. Director, Institute of Coding. For services to the Digital Sector.
- Robert Ian Houston. Founder and Chair of Trustees, Boost Charitable Trust. For services to People with Disabilities and to Disadvantaged Communities through Sport.
- Ian Philip Howard. Vice President, World Triathlon. For services to Triathlon.
- Inna Hryhorovych. Head Teacher, St Mary's Ukrainian School, Royal Borough of Kensington and Chelsea. For services to Education and to the Ukrainian Community in the UK.
- Professor Francis John Hughes. Lately Professor of Periodontology, King's College London. For services to Dentistry.
- Katherine Alexandra Hui. Founder, Laces Community Club. For services to Community Football and to Young Women in East London.
- Catherine Elizabeth Humphrey. Principal, Groggan Primary School, Randalstown, County Antrim. For services to Education in Northern Ireland.
- Suzanne Elizabeth Hutchinson. Chief Executive, Little Hearts Matter. For services to Children, Adults and their Families with Congenital Heart Disease.
- Dr. Corinne Hutton. Founder, Finding Your Feet. For services to Sepsis Awareness and to Amputees.
- Roksanda Ilinčić. For services to Fashion Design.
- George Imafidon. Chief Executive Officer, Motivez. For services to Engineering, to Technology and to Young People.
- Dr. John Lea Ivens. Executive Headteacher, Maudsley and Bethlem Hospital School, London Borough of Southwark. For services to Education.
- William Hugh Jack. Proprietor, Duke of York Public House. For services to the Arts and to Tourism in Belfast.
- Faye Elizabeth Alice Jackson. Chief Communications Officer, Ceremonials and Culture, Department for Culture, Media and Sport. For services to the State Funeral of Her Majesty Queen Elizabeth II.
- Dr. Desmond Jaddoo. Bishop, The Village Fellowship Church and Chairman, Windrush National Organisation. For services to the Windrush Generation.
- Sarah Mary James. Director, Craft Festival. For services to Craft.
- Sarah Helen Atkinson Javaid. Founder, Cycle Sisters. For services to Cycling and to the community in London.
- Thomas Jeffers. For services to Local Government and to the community in Dundonald, County Down.
- Archibald Ian Jenkins. For services to Charity and to the community in Peebles, Scotland.
- Kapaljit Singh Jhuti. Head of Services, Transport and Passenger Logistics, Heathrow Airport, London. For services to the State Funeral of Her Majesty Queen Elizabeth II.
- Joysy John. Adviser, EdTech. For services to the Technology Sector.
- Barbara Ann Johnson. Director of Nursing, Risedale Estates Ltd. For services to Social Care.
- Clare Louise Johnson. Deputy Head, Property Profession, Valuation Office Agency. For services to the Surveying Profession and to Diversity.
- Alan Edward Jones. Lately Chairman and Consultant, The Village Bakery. For services to the Food Industry and to the Economy in Wales.
- Dr. Gareth Lloyd Jones. For services to Sport and Exercise Medicine in Wales.
- Keith Jones. Chairman, EAST. For services to Marginalised People in Peterborough, Cambridgeshire.
- Pauline Jones. Employer and Partnership Manager, Department for Work and Pensions. For services to the community in Birmingham, particularly during the 2022 Commonwealth Games.
- Sonya Jones. For services to Tackling Child Exploitation.
- Nadine McKenzie Judge. Choreographer and Honorary Patron, Big Bad Wolf Children's Theatre Company. For services to Dance in Scotland.
- Natalia Kaliada. Co-Founding Artistic Director, Belarus Free Theatre. For services to Theatre.
- Sardarni Navleen Kaur. Founder, Sahara Sisterhood. For services to Women and to Interfaith Relations.
- Dr. Michael Olatunde Kehinde. Equality, Diversity and Inclusion Champion, Environment Agency. For Public Service.
- Kenneth Keld. Secretary, North of England Branch, British Korean Veterans Association. For services to Veterans.
- Ellen Dorothy Kemp. Member, Boleyn Trust. For services to Education in the London Borough of Newham.
- Dr. Rosalind Penelope Kennedy. For services to Charity and to the community in Bristol.
- Penelope Jane Kenway. Director of Early Intervention and Prevention, London Borough of Islington. For services to Early Years Children and Families.
- Nicolai Khalezin. Co-Founding Artistic Director, Belarus Free Theatre. For services to Theatre.
- Ritu Khurana. Disc Jockey and Broadcaster. For services to Music and to Broadcasting.
- Heather Mary Kidd. Councillor, Shropshire Council. For services to Rural Communities.
- Carly Teresa Nyst Kind. Director, Ada Lovelace Institute. For services to Data and Artificial Intelligence Ethics.
- Andrew Michael Blair Knox. Director of Population Health and Engagement, Bay Health and Care Partners, Morecambe Bay. For services to General Practice.
- Dr. Nihara Sonali Krause. Founder and Chief Executive, Stem4. For services to the Mental Health of Young People.
- Charlotte Kume-Holland. Head of Policy, Major Events, Cabinet Office and lately Head of Strategy Covid-19 Vaccine Deployment, Department of Health and Social Care. For Public Service, Mental Health and Wellbeing Leadership, and to the State Funeral of Her Majesty Queen Elizabeth II.
- Elizabeth Angela Lalley. Director of Risk, Resilience and Community Safety, Welsh Government. For services to the State Funeral of Her Majesty Queen Elizabeth II.
- Frances Emma Lane. Chief Executive Officer, Northwick Park Trust, Canvey Island. For services to Education in Essex.
- Professor Helen Eileen Langton. Vice-chancellor, University of Suffolk. For services to Education.
- Elizabeth Delia Larkin. Founder and President, Friends of Rosie. For services to Charity, especially Childhood Cancer Research.
- Andrew James Laver. For services to Education in Bradford, West Yorkshire.
- Anne-Marie Lavery. Head of Facilities Management, Prime Minister's Office. For Public Service.
- Julie Lawrence. Lately Director, National Executive Committee and General Secretary of Office Staff, Labour Party. For Political Service.
- Mark Maurice Leach. Founder and Editor, Wonkhe. For services to Higher Education.
- Paul Jeffrey Leach. Paediatric and Special Care Dentist. For services to Children with Special Educational Needs and Disabilities in North West Wales.
- Judith Elizabeth Alison Ledger. Founder and Chief Executive, Baby Lifeline. For services to Pregnant Women and Newborn Babies.
- Stewart Andrew Leggett. Interim Director for Roads, Transport Scotland. For services in Scotland on the Demise of Her Majesty Queen Elizabeth II.
- Hearl Roger Lenton. Chair of Trustees, Wellspring Academy Trust, Barnsley, West Yorkshire. For services to Education.
- Marcella Leonard. For services to Social Work in Northern Ireland and Internationally.
- Rabbi Stanley Levin (Shlomo Levin). For services to Interfaith and to the Jewish Community in the London Borough of Camden.
- Robin Lipscombe. Learning Facilitator, Marshall Skills Academy, Cambridge. For services to Further Education and Skills.
- Helen Mary Lloyd. For services to Cultural Heritage Conservation.
- Patricia Joyce Longdon. Chair, Strategic Lay Forum, Imperial College Healthcare NHS Trust. For services to Health and Social Care.
- Rachel Anne Lopata. Co-Founder, Sea-Changers. For services to Marine Nature Conservation.
- David Thomas Lowbridge-Ellis. Director of School Improvement, Matrix Academy Trust, Walsall, West Midlands. For services to Education.
- Adrian Lucas, DL. For services to Charity and Veterans in Scotland.
- Karen Jane Lynch. For services to Social Enterprise and to Charity.
- Steven Machin. Lately Head of Counter Terrorism, HM Prison Whitemoor. For services to HM Prison and Probation Service.
- Ronald John Maclean. Manager, Grimsay Boat Shed. For services to Boat Building and to Heritage Crafts in the Western Isles.
- Annie Macsween, DL. Honorary President, Comunn Eachdraidh Nis (Ness Historical Society). For services to the Scots Gaelic Language.
- Barbara Mary Maddison. Honorary Vice-President, National Council of Women of Great Britain. For services to Young Women.
- Sally Magnusson. Broadcaster and Author. For services to People with Dementia and their Carers.
- Rizwana Mahmood-Ahmed. Headteacher, Carlton Junior and Infants School, Dewsbury, West Yorkshire. For services to Education.
- Andrew Malcolm. Chief Executive Officer, W H Malcolm Ltd. For services to the Transport Industry.
- Anthony Kevin Male. For services to Charity and to the community in Portsmouth, Hampshire.
- Dennis John Mardon. Chair, Citizens' Advice Exeter. For services to Vulnerable People in Exeter, Devon.
- John Michael Marren, DL. Founder, Company Shop Group. For services to Alleviating Food Poverty.
- Camilla Marshall. Deputy Head of News, Prime Minister's Office. For services to the State Funeral of Her Majesty Queen Elizabeth II.
- Hannah McGarry McLachlan Marshall (Anna Marshall). For services to Lawn Bowls.
- Andrew Clive Martin. Head of Access and Services, House of Commons. For services to Parliament and to the State Funeral of Her Majesty Queen Elizabeth II.
- Roy Martin. Volunteer Engineering Co-ordinator, RAF Museum and Chair, The Aerospace Museum Society. For services to Heritage.
- Julia Margaret Maskery. Highly Specialist Paediatric Occupational Therapist, Belfast Trust. For services to Children.
- Andrew Mason. Officer, National Crime Agency. For services to Law Enforcement.
- Sonia Maulson. General Manager (North), Southeastern Trains. For services to Rail Transport and to the State Funeral of Her Majesty Queen Elizabeth II.
- William Jonathan McArthur. Emergency Planning Officer, Northern Ireland Ambulance Service. For services to Emergency Planning Preparedness, Resilience and Response.
- Thomas Mcauley. Acting Head, Sign Language Policy Team, Department for Communities, Northern Ireland Executive. For services to Deaf People in Northern Ireland.
- Dr. Mark McBride-Wright. Founder and Chief Executive Officer, EqualEngineers. For services to Diversity, Equity and Inclusion in Engineering.
- David Alexander Mervyn McCall. For services to Business and to the community in Northern Ireland.
- Davina Lucy Pascale McCall. For services to Broadcasting.
- Gerard Joseph McCann. For services to Victims of Historical Institutional Abuse in Northern Ireland.
- Michael Phillip Anthony McCann. Head of Maintenance Operations, House of Commons. For services to Parliament and to the State Funeral of Her Majesty Queen Elizabeth II.
- Dr. Rosemary McCarthy. Head of Global Workforce, Education and Research, Health Education England. For services to Midwifery and Maternity Healthcare.
- Mark Richard McClennon. Chair, Institute for Apprenticeships and Technical Education. For services to Further Education and Apprenticeships.
- Professor Wilson Glenn McCluggage. Professor, Queen's University, Belfast. For services to People with Gynaecological Cancer.
- Vicky Lee McClure. Actor. For services to Drama and to Charity.
- Laura Ann McCorry. Head of Hillsborough Castle, Historic Royal Palaces. For services in Northern Ireland on the Demise of Her Majesty Queen Elizabeth II.
- Dr. Hazel McFarlane. Development Officer, Royal National Institute of Blind People. For charitable services to People with Sight Loss.
- Mary Katherine McGee. Business Engagement Officer, Mid Ulster Council. For services to Tourism in Northern Ireland.
- Michael Albert Paul McGrath, DL. Founder and Chief Executive Officer, The Muscle Help Foundation. For charitable services to People with Muscular Dystrophy.
- Margaret McGuckin. For services to Survivors and Victims of Historical Institutional Abuse in Northern Ireland.
- Professor Lynne McKenna. Dean, Education and Society, University of Sunderland, Tyne and Wear. For services to Education.
- Martina Elizabeth McKenzie. Chief Executive, Staffline Ireland and Chair, Policy and Advocacy, Federation of Small Businesses. For services to the Economy in Northern Ireland.
- Ian McLaughlan. Lately Chief Executive, Youth Scotland. For services to Charity and to Youth Work.
- Maria Teresa McLoughlin. Chair, Women's Artistic Gymnastics Technical Committee, British Gymnastics. For services to Gymnastics.
- Joan Elizabeth McParland. For services to People with Myalgic Encephalomyelitis and to their Families and Carers in Northern Ireland.
- Reverend Tracey Elaine McRoberts. Rector, Saint Matthew's Parish and Rural Dean of Mid-Belfast. For services to the community in Belfast.
- Robb Merchant. Owner, White Castle Vineyard. For services to Viticulture.
- Heather Patricia Miller. Lately Head of Quality, Excellence and Development, South Eastern Regional College. For services to Education in Northern Ireland.
- Lorna Marie Millington. Future Networks Manager, Cadent Gas. For services to Business and to the Environment.
- Dr. Gary George Ernest Mitchell. Senior Lecturer, School of Nursing and Midwifery, Queen's University Belfast. For services to Nursing and Dementia Care.
- Professor Terrie Edith Moffitt, FBA. Chair, Social Behaviour and Development, King's College London. For services to Social Science.
- Rizwan Wali Mohammed. For services to the community in Glasgow.
- Professor Mark John Monaghan. Consultant Clinical Scientist in Echocardiography and Director of Non-invasive Cardiology, King's College Hospital NHS Foundation Trust. For services to Cardiology.
- Derek Moore. Community Development Worker, North West Cultural Partnership. For services to the community in Londonderry.
- Janice Kathleen Moore. Senior Psychosocial Practitioner, British Red Cross. For services to Mental Health.
- William Morgan. Patron and Fundraiser, NSPCC. For services to Charity.
- Selwyn Arthur Leslie Morgans. Lately Manager, Aycliffe Secure Children's Home, Durham. For services to Children's Social Care.
- Michelle Sharon Morris. Early Years Language and Communication Pathway Lead, Greater Manchester Combined Authority. For services to Speech and Language Therapy.
- Reverend John Irvine Morrow. Chaplain, Northern Ireland Prison Service. For services to Prisoners and their Families.
- Professor Raja Anindya Sekhar Mukherjee. Consultant Psychiatrist, Surrey and Borders Partnership NHS Foundation Trust. For services to People with Fetal Alcohol Spectrum Disorders.
- Jennie Muskett. Composer. For services to Music.
- Christine Elizabeth Myhill. Libraries and Heritage Manager, Gateshead and Chair, Association of Senior Children's and Education Librarians. For services to Public Libraries during Covid-19.
- Robert Malcolm Naish. Lately Protector, Canal and River Trust. For services to the Canal Network.
- Lennox Floyd Nembhard. Chief Immigration Officer, Home Office. For Public Service and to Diversity.
- Shiva Chandra Niraula. Pandit, Brigade of Gurkhas, Ministry of Defence. For pastoral services to Military Personnel.
- Alan Stephen Noake. Assistant County Commissioner, Global Projects and Community Impact (Kent Scouts) and Deal, Walmer, Sandwich and District. For services to Young People in Kent.
- Barry Joseph Nolan. Chair of Trustees, Eden Academy Trust. For services to Education.
- Damian Benedict Nolan. Divisional Manager, Adult Social Care Services, Halton Borough Council. For services to Adult Social Care.
- Professor Christine Susan Norton. Professor of Clinical Nursing Research, Florence Nightingale Faculty of Nursing, Midwifery and Palliative Care, King's College London. For services to Nursing Research.
- Peter Cairns O'Hara. Chief Executive, OLM Systems. For services to Social Care.
- Sally Angela O'Sullivan. Board Member, Turn2Us. For services to Charity and to Families Affected by Poverty during Covid-19.
- Sally Jane Orange. Fundraiser. For services to Charity and to Mental Health.
- Rhiannon Catherine Page. Ceremonials Team, Department for Culture, Media and Sport. For Public Service.
- Asitha Panditharatna. Director of Employment Services, The Forward Trust. For services to Further Education and Skills.
- Professor Catherine Rebecca Parker. Chair, Institute of Place Management, Manchester Metropolitan University. For services to Education and to Place Management.
- Anita Parmar. Head, Lessons from Auschwitz Project, Holocaust Educational Trust. For services to Holocaust Education and Remembrance.
- Professor Kanwal John Pasi. Lately Centre Director, Royal London Haemophilia Centre, Barts Health NHS Trust. For services to the NHS.
- Jay Prakash Patel. Qualified Person Assessor, AstraZeneca. For services to Public Health during Covid-19.
- Jeeta Patel. Lately Senior Policy Adviser, Cabinet Office. For Public Service.
- Christine Grace Payne. Lately General Secretary, Equity. For services to the Trade Union Movement.
- Hilary Jasmine Erica Paynter. Exhibitions Secretary, Society of Wood Engravers. For services to the Arts.
- Professor Robert Charles Pearson. Lately Chair, Clinical Ethics Committee, Manchester University NHS Foundation Trust. For services to Medicine, Medical Education and to Health Research and Innovation.
- Deborah Evelyn Pecover. Commission Director, Arcadis. For services to the State Funeral of Her Majesty Queen Elizabeth II.
- Leanne Jummai Pero. Founder, Leanne Pero Foundation. For services to Charity, particularly to Minority Ethnic People with Cancer.
- Emma Louise Petrucci. Co-Founder, Red Sky Foundation. For services to Health and to the community in North East England.
- Sergio Petrucci. Co-Founder, Red Sky Foundation. For services to Health and to the community in North East England.
- Margaret Patricia Pieroni. Lately Head of Employment Policy, Pay and Reward, House of Lords. For services to Parliament and to the State Funeral of Her Majesty Queen Elizabeth II.
- Gail Fiona Pirkis. Co-Founder and Editor, Slightly Foxed. For services to Literature.
- Rabbi Alan Plancey. Councillor, Hertsmere Borough Council and Emeritus Rabbi, Borehamwood and Elstree Synagogue. For Political and Public Service.
- Dr. Shubha Platt (Shubha Sathyendranath). Merit Scientist, Remote Sensing, Plymouth Marine Laboratory. For services to Oceanography.
- David William Pond. Lately Chief Executive, Great Britain Wheelchair Rugby. For services to Wheelchair Rugby.
- David John Poole. Clockmaker. For services to Horology and Heritage Crafts.
- Andrew Kenneth Portersmith. Chief Executive, Music Stuff. For services to Young People and to the community in Manchester.
- Dr. Sandrasekeram Premachandran. Advisor, Care Quality Commission and Emergency Medicine Consultant, Frimley Health NHS Foundation Trust. For services to Health and Care.
- Colin John Preston. Lately Chief Executive, Shropshire Wildlife Trust. For services to Wildlife Conservation in Shropshire and the Marches.
- Jenny Halpern Prince. Founder and Chair, Access Aspiration. For services to Charity, to Young People and to Social Mobility.
- Maxine Hannah Pritchard. Head, Financial Inclusion and Vulnerability, HSBC UK. For services to Vulnerable People.
- Dr. Jennifer Elizabeth Pugh. Chief Medical Officer, Irish Horse Racing Regulatory Board. For services to Horse Racing in Northern Ireland.
- Caroline Thomson Rae. Libraries and Community Assets Manager, London Borough of Newham. For services to Public Libraries.
- Aftabur Rahman. Chief Executive Officer, Legacy West Midlands. For services to Heritage and to the community in Birmingham.
- Nimisha Raja. Founder, Nim's Fruit Crisps. For services to Small and Medium Enterprises.
- Adil Rashid. For services to Cricket.
- Adam Ernest Reid. Senior Security Strategic Communications Manager, Northern Ireland Office. For services to the State Funeral of Her Majesty Queen Elizabeth II.
- Dr. John Henderson Reid. Chair of Trustees, Trimontium Museum. For services to Culture and Heritage in Scotland.
- Norman Victor Reid. Staff Officer, Department for Communities, Northern Ireland Executive. For services to Social Housing.
- Petro Rewko. Board Chairman, Association of Ukrainians in Great Britain. For services to the Ukrainian Community.
- Dr. Martin Richard Finch Reynolds. Volunteers Coordinator, MissionAssist Charity. For services to Indigenous Languages.
- Suzanne Jacqueline Richards. Campaigner, Smile For Joel. For services to People Bereaved by Homicide.
- Elizabeth Anne Rix. Chief Nurse, Portsmouth Hospitals University NHS Trust. For services to Nursing Leadership.
- Paul Anthony Roach. Town Manager, Windsor, Eton and Ascot and Deputy Chair, Ceremonial Events Planning Group, Royal Borough of Windsor and Maidenhead. For services to the State Funeral of Her Majesty Queen Elizabeth II.
- Sonia Heather Roberts. For services to the community in Shropshire.
- Dr. Claire Elisabeth Robinson. Consultant Radiographer in Forensic Imaging, University Hospitals of Leicester NHS Trust. For services to Forensic Investigations.
- Graham Robinson. Policy Manager, Scottish Government. For services to Equality in Scotland.
- Suzann Marie Robinson (Suzann McLean). Chief Executive Officer and Artistic Director, Theatre Peckham. For services to the Arts and to Marginalised Young People in London.
- Lieutenant Colonel (Rtd.) Paul Damian Rodgers. Staff Officer, Headquarters Infantry, Ministry of Defence. For services to the Army and to Veterans.
- Ian Malcolm Rogers. Athletics Official. For services to Athletics.
- Helen Margaret Rooker (Helen Hughes). Lately Voluntary Chief Executive Officer, Ludlow Assembly Rooms. For services to Charity, to the Arts and to the community in Ludlow, Shropshire.
- Alison Ross. Operations and Culture Director, Auto Trader. For services to the Digital and Technology Industry.
- Erika Ann Rushton. Co-Founder, Kindred Liverpool City Region Community Interest Company. For services to Civil Society and to Social Enterprise.
- Alison Ryland. Lately Head of Healthcare, HM Prisons Usk and Prescoed, Aneurin Bevan University Health Board. For services to Prison Healthcare in Monmouthshire.
- Narinder Singh Sagoo. For services to Charity.
- Reverend Fiona Jean Sample. Founder and Chief Executive Officer, The Oswin Project. For services to the Rehabilitation of Offenders.
- Bilal Bin Saqib. Co-Founder, One Million Meals. For services to the NHS and to the community in Stanmore, London Borough of Harrow.
- Prodaman Kumar Sarwal. Lately Trustee, Chatham Historic Dockyard Trust and Chair, Master Ropemakers Ltd. For services to Heritage and to the Charitable Sector.
- Jacqueline Ann Sawdon. Co-Founder, The Exodus Project. For services to Young People and to Charity in Barnsley, South Yorkshire.
- Martin Harold Sawdon. Co-Founder, The Exodus Project. For services to Young People and to Charity in Barnsley, South Yorkshire.
- Clare Elizabeth Scherer. Chief Executive Officer, The Naval Children's Charity. For services to Royal Navy Families.
- Kendra Amelia Schneller. Homeless and Inclusion Health Programme Lead, Queen's Nursing Institute and Nurse Practitioner, Guy's and St Thomas' NHS Foundation Trust. For services to Homeless and Inclusion Health Nursing.
- Susannah Ruth Schofield. For services to Journalism and to Diversity in the Broadcasting Industry.
- Joe Scotland. Director, Studio Voltaire. For services to Art.
- Jane Elizabeth Scott. Divisional Bereavement Project Lead Midwife, West Hertfordshire Teaching Hospitals NHS Trust, and Lead and Founder, National Bereavement Midwives' Forum. For services to Bereaved Parents.
- Sophie Elizabeth Scowen. Major Ceremonials Manager, Greater London Authority. For services to the State Funeral of Her Majesty Queen Elizabeth II.
- Richard Anthony Selby, DL. Managing Director Pro Steel Engineering and National Chair, Institute of Directors. For services to the Economy and to Charity in Wales.
- John Alexander Charles Sennett. Police Staff, Metropolitan Police Service. For services to Policing.
- Dr. Farrukh Tasnim Shah. Consultant Haematologist, Whittington Health NHS Trust. For services to Thalassaemia and Sickle Cell Patients.
- Sarah Isobel Sharpe. Lately Support Staff Member, National Assembly for Wales. For Political and Public Service.
- Catherine Annette Shaw. Lead Advanced Nurse Practitioner, NHS Highland. For services to Nursing in Rural Scotland.
- Dr. Natalie Susannah Shenker. Co-Founder, Human Milk Foundation. For services to Charity and to Human Milk Banking.
- Fallon Suzanne Michelle Sherrock. For services to Darts.
- Mercy Lusungu Shibemba. Speaker and Campaigner. For services to People with HIV.
- Colin Shields. For services to Ice Hockey.
- Samuel Shouksmith. Team Leader, Ministry of Defence. For services to Defence.
- David Arthur Shreeve. Co-founder and Director, Conservation Foundation, and Environmental Adviser, Archbishops' Council, Church of England. For services to the Environment.
- Andrew Paul Simpson. Head of Digital Communications, Department for Culture, Media and Sport. For services to Government Communications.
- James Simpson. For services to Wheelchair Rugby League.
- Michelle Gabriel Anita Simpson. Project Coordinator, St Columbs Park House. For services to Young People in Northern Ireland.
- Dr. Inderjit Singh. For voluntary and charitable services to the community in Scotland.
- Harvinder Singh Rai. Sergeant, West Midlands Police. For services to Policing and to the Sikh Community.
- Rosalind Margaret Slinger. Chair, Centre Membership Committee, Pony Club. For services to Equestrianism and to Charity.
- David Mark Smith. Lately Chief Executive, Energy Networks Association. For services to the Energy Industry.
- James Smith. Team Leader, Ministry of Defence. For services to Defence.
- Janine Faye Smith. Commercial and Digital Resilience Manager, Department for Work and Pensions. For Public Service.
- Stephen Robert Smith. Lately Chief Engineer, BAE Systems Digital Intelligence. For services to Defence.
- Hina Solanki. Founder, Sol Cosmedics. For services to Business and to Charity.
- Professor Eva Sorensen. Professor, Chemical Engineering, University College London. For services to Education and Chemical Engineering.
- Glenda Stephanie Spencer. Chair, Trinity School, Dagenham, London Borough of Barking and Dagenham. For services to Children with Disabilities and Special Educational Needs.
- Patricia Clare Spruce (Patricia Murphy). Associate Director, People Services and Recruitment, Yeovil District Hospital and Somerset NHS Foundation Trusts. For services to the NHS.
- Jyotsna Srikanth. Violinist. For services to Music.
- Patricia Mary Stafford. Vice Chair, Battersea. For services to Charity and to Visually Impaired People.
- Non Rhiannydd Stanford. For services to Triathlon in Wales.
- Jane Elizabeth Stanford-Beale. Volunteer and Chief Executive Officer, Autism Berkshire. For services to Young People with Autism and their Families.
- Richard Antony Stanton. Campaigner, Maternity Services, Shrewsbury and Telford Hospital NHS Trust. For services to Maternity Healthcare.
- Jadwiga Lisa Stepanovic. Founder and Chief Executive Officer, Social Ark. For services to Young People and to Social Enterprise.
- Sandra Stephenson. Head of Personnel Security, Department for International Trade. For Public Service.
- John Benedict Stepney. Chair, Nationwide Association of Blood Bikes. For services to the NHS and to Charity.
- John Alexander Eadie Stevenson. Volunteer, Tennis Scotland. For services to Lawn Tennis.
- James Brown Stewart. Lately Chair, Hamilton Sound Talking Newspaper. For services to Visually Impaired People in Hamilton, Lanarkshire.
- James Wilson Stockan. Leader, Orkney Isles Council. For services to Local Government.
- Reverend Robert Stevenson Stockman. Minister, Fitzroy Presbyterian Church, Belfast. For services to Peace and Reconciliation.
- Karen Stone. Team Leader, Ministry of Defence. For services to Defence.
- Kelly Stone. Head of Airport Operations, Heathrow Airport, London. For services to Women in Aviation Engineering.
- Sandra Strong. Chair, Customs and Export Licensing Committee, British Exporters Association. For services to British Exporters.
- Alan Edward Stubbs. Vice-President, Buglife. For services to Invertebrate Conservation.
- Donna Marie Swan. Founder, Calmer Therapy. For services to Children with Special Educational Needs and their Families in North East England.
- Robin Keiji Kingston Sykes. Lately Head of Import Controls, Department for International Trade. For Public Service.
- Richard James Symonds. Security Incident Policy and Investigation Team Leader, Ministry of Defence. For services to Defence.
- Penelope Jane Taylor. Head, Newark College and Air and Space Institute. For services to Skills and Employment in Newark and Sherwood, Nottinghamshire.
- Susan Taylor. Chair, British Amateur Rugby League Association and Vice-President, Rugby Football League. For services to Rugby League Football.
- Iryna Terlecky. Chair, Association of Ukrainian Women in Great Britain. For services to Ukrainian Refugees.
- Karel Victoria Thomas. Executive Director, British Universities Finance Directors Group. For services to Higher Education.
- Lloyd Justin Thomas. Lead, Apprenticeships and Funded Skills, The Co-Operative Group. For services to Food Retail.
- Robert Thompson. Chef. For services to Hospitality, to Tourism and to Charity.
- Terri Thomson. Deputy Head, Protocol and Honours Team, Scottish Government. For services in Scotland on the Demise of Her Majesty Queen Elizabeth II.
- Paul Nigel Todd. Manager, Green Flag Award Scheme and Keep Britain Tidy. For services to Public Parks and to the community in Liverpool.
- Iain Douglas Tolhurst. Organic Farmer. For services to Agriculture.
- Dr. Yuliana Topazly. Founder, Buddy With. For services to Business and Female Entrepreneurship.
- Rachel Tranter-Needham. Director, Group for Education in Museums. For services to Museums, Heritage and to the Arts.
- Jean Verona Trewick. Business Management Lead, Department for Work and Pensions. For services to Voluntary Organisations.
- Terence David Alan Tricker. For services to the community in Staffordshire.
- Katharine Jane Turnpenney. Chief Executive Officer, Children First Academy Trust, Edmonton, London Borough of Enfield. For services to Education.
- Ian Robert Twinley, DL. Chair, East Anglia Reserve Forces and Cadets Association. For voluntary service to Defence and to the community in the East of England.
- William Peter Upham. Executive Director, Growing Space. For services to Mental Health in Newport, Wales.
- David Upjohn. Foster Carer, Credo Care. For services to Children with Disabilities.
- Elliot David Vaughn. Founder, GiveOut. For services to Charity and to the LGBTQ+ Community.
- Lisa Serafina Ventura. For services to Cyber Security and to Diversity and Inclusion.
- Dr. Arturo Vilches-Moraga. Consultant Geriatrician and Physician, Northern Care Alliance NHS Group. For services to Geriatric Patients.
- Dr. Shivani Anika Walia. Founder, Anika Food Charity. For services to the Alleviation of Food Poverty.
- David Kenneth Walker, JP. For services to the Hospitality Industry and to Charity.
- Rhoda Jean Walker. Volunteer, Northern Ireland Rare Diseases Partnership. For services to People with Rare Diseases in Northern Ireland.
- Kingsley Cyril Ward. Founder, Rockfield Studios. For services to Music.
- Jamie Antoney Ward-Smith. Chair, Co-Op Foundation and lately Chief Executive Officer, Do-It Foundation. For services to Young People and Charity.
- David Timothy Warner. Chair, Local Trust. For services to the Community and Voluntary Sector.
- Derek Alexander Watson. Quaestor and Factor, University of St Andrews. For services to Entrepreneurship and Sustainability.
- Gillian Anne Weaver. Co-Founder, Human Milk Foundation. For services to Charity and to Human Milk Banking.
- Helen Catherine Webb. Co-Founder, Sea-Changers. For services to Marine Nature Conservation.
- Susan Mary Wilkinson. Lately County Co-ordinator, Farm Community Network. For services to the Farming Community in Somerset.
- John Beresford Willett. Police Staff, Office of the Sussex Police and Crime Commissioner. For services to Policing and to Community Cohesion in Sussex.
- Charles Emmanuel Williams (Charlie Dark). Founder, Run Dem Crew. For services to Running and to Young People.
- David Henry Williams, DL. Vice Chair, D2N2 Local Enterprise Partnership and Chairman, Geldards LLP. For services to Business and to the Economy in Derbyshire and Nottinghamshire.
- Lynn Willis. Operations Manager, Sellafield Ltd. For services to Business.
- Barbara Wilson. Programme Adviser, Childcare Works. For services to Education.
- Professor Bencie Woll. Professor of Sign Language, University College London. For services to Higher Education and Deaf People.
- Hazel Verena Constance Wood. Co-Founder and Editor, Slightly Foxed. For services to Literature.
- Katherine Wooder. Executive Headteacher, The Bridges Federation, London Borough of Southwark. For services to Education.
- Robert Woodland. Wood Grainer and Decorative Artist. For services to Art and to Heritage Crafts.
- Claire Elizabeth Woods. Head Gardener, Hillsborough Castle. For services to Horticulture and to the community in Northern Ireland on the Demise of Her Majesty Queen Elizabeth II.
- Colin Richard Woolford. Strategic Security Director and Counter Terrorism Adviser, City of London Corporation. For services to the State Funeral of Her Majesty Queen Elizabeth II.
- Dr. Margaret Wright. For services to the Third Sector in Scotland.
- Graham Philip Yandell. Chief Executive, Yandell Media Group. For services to the Media and to the Food Industry.
- Sharon Young. Principal, Project Engineering, Elizabeth Line, Transport for London. For services to Rail Transport in London.
- Susan Jane Young (Susan Alder). People Policy Leader, HM Revenue and Customs. For services to the State Funeral of Her Majesty Queen Elizabeth II.
- Janet Sally Zmroczek. Lately Head, European and Americas Collections, British Library. For services to Literature and to Heritage.

=== British Empire Medal (BEM) ===
British Empire Medal ribbon

- Anthony John Adkins. Fundraiser. For services to Charity.
- Brian Alcock. Hand Grinder. For services to Heritage Crafts.
- Idris Ali. Provision Contracts Manager, Department for Work and Pensions. For voluntary service to the community in Oldham, Greater Manchester.
- Icek Jankel Alterman. For services to Holocaust Remembrance and Education.
- Gill Andrew. Manager, Department for Work and Pensions Job Centre. For Public and Charitable Services in Fleetwood, Lancashire.
- Ezekiel Abiodun Awoyomi. Inspector, British Transport Police. For services to Policing and to Young People.
- Paul Maurice Axford. Royal Ceremonial and Honours Officer, Scottish Government. For services in Scotland on the Demise of Her Majesty Queen Elizabeth II.
- Preston Thomas Ayres. Trustee, YMCA Milton Keynes. For services to Young People in Buckinghamshire.
- Rahima Do Nascimento Aziz. Trustee, Aziz Foundation. For services to Young People.
- Catherine Bailey. Lately Nurse Director for Musculoskeletal Services, Sheffield Teaching Hospitals NHS Foundation Trust. For services to Nursing.
- Elizabeth Susan Baitson. Founder, High Net Connect. For services to Business and to Entrepreneurs.
- Perminderjeet Kaur Banwait. Founder and Managing Director, Banwait Group Holdings. For services to Social Care.
- Joan Linda Barnett. For services to the community in Hampton, London Borough of Richmond upon Thames.
- Zoe Bennett. Entrepreneur and Motivational Speaker. For services to Charity and Inspiring Disadvantaged People.
- Graham Michael Benson. For services to Young People and to the community in Goole, East Riding of Yorkshire.
- Carol Antonio Bent. Senior Youth Worker, The Avenues Youth Project, Queen's Park, London. For services to Young People in the City of Westminster.
- Cheryl Bertschi. Tutor, Southend Adult Community College, Southend-on-Sea, Essex. For services to Education.
- Balvir Mohan Bhalla. Founder, Super Cool Friends Charity. For services to the community in Ilford, London Borough of Redbridge, particularly during Covid-19.
- Nighat Bhola. Director, Humdum UK. For services to Food Provision and to the community in the London Borough of Barking and Dagenham, particularly during Covid-19.
- Jennifer Susan Blackwell. Founder, DanceSyndrome. For services to Disabled People.
- Margaret Francis Dorothy Boadella. Lately Association Chair, Plymouth Moorview, Conservative Party South West. For Political Service.
- Claire Marie Bond. Constable, Staffordshire Police. For services to Women in Policing and to the community in Staffordshire.
- Robert Frank Bonner. Curator, Greater Manchester Fire Service Museum Trust. For services to Fire and Rescue Heritage.
- Nigel Thomas Bowers. Chair, Chatterley Whitfield Friends. For services to Heritage.
- Linda Bowley. Volunteer. For services to Charity and to the community in the London Borough of Redbridge.
- Gail Ann Boyd. For voluntary services to the community in the Clogher Valley, County Tyrone.
- Margaret Kathleen Bracey. Chair, South Gloucestershire Branch, The Royal British Legion. For voluntary service to Veterans and to the community in South Gloucestershire.
- Anthony Brooke. Founder, Bumble Bee Barbarians Mixed Ability Contact Rugby Union Team. For services to People with Disabilities.
- Norman Brown. Group Scout Leader, 3rd Hindley Scout Group. For services to Young People in Greater Manchester.
- William Austin Brown. For services to the community in Coalville, Leicestershire.
- Sheila Margaret Bruce. Musical Director, Cancer Fund for Children, Inverness. For services to the community in Inverness and the Highlands.
- Kimberly Bryans. For services to Community Managed Libraries in the London Borough of Bexley.
- Karen Bullock. Founder, Snydale Riding for the Disabled Association. For services to Charity and Disabled People in Snydale, West Yorkshire.
- Juliet Victoria Burgess-Ray. Community Access Defibrillator Co-ordinator. For services to the community in Rutland.
- Gary Burks. Superintendent and Registrar, City of London Cemetery and Crematorium. For services to the Bereaved and to the community in East London.
- Jack David George Burt. Runnymede District Vice President, 1st Egham Hythe Scout Group. For services to Young People and to the community in Egham Hythe, Surrey.
- Lydia Monica Burton. Chair, British Wheel of Yoga. For services to Yoga.
- Francis Michael Callaghan. For voluntary services to the community in County Tyrone and County Fermanagh.
- Margaret Patricia Calver. Treasurer, Norwich Table Tennis League and Committee Member, Norfolk County Table Tennis Association. For services to Table Tennis.
- David Euan Campbell. Founder, Strathearn Artspace. For services to Culture in Perthshire.
- Richard Menzies Campbell. Manager, Arbroath Football Club. For services to Association Football and to the community in Angus.
- Margaret Carey. Service Delivery Coach, Department for Work and Pensions. For services to the community in Hull, East Riding of Yorkshire.
- Glyn Caron. For services to the community in Llanyravon, Cwmbran.
- Tarpe Catford. Co-ordinator, Powerhouse. For services to Charity and Women with Learning Disabilities.
- Anndeloris Marina Chacon. Chief Executive Officer, Bristol Black Carers. For services to Charity and to the community in Bristol.
- Caroline Ann Joan Chadwick. Director, Biomedical Services Unit, University of Birmingham. For services to Humane Animal Research.
- Edna May Chapple. For services to the community in Sedgley, West Midlands.
- Jeanne Catherine Chattoe. Lately Chair, Board of Trustees, Against Breast Cancer. For charitable services to People with Cancer.
- Rekesh Chauhan. Pianist and Composer. For services to Music, to Charity and to Mental Health in the British Asian Community, particularly during Covid-19.
- Deborah Chestnutt. Project Coordinator, Good Morning Ballymena. For services to Older People in County Antrim.
- Ehsan Shahid Choudhry. Co-Founder, MH The Open Kitchen. For services to the community in the London Borough of Hounslow.
- Graham Charles Clarke, QPM. President, Frome Collegians Youth Team. For services to Association Football and to Young People in South West England.
- Julia Clarke. Lately Deputy Headteacher, Prince of Wales Primary School, London Borough of Enfield. For services to Education.
- Richard John Clarke. Crew Manager, Suffolk Fire and Rescue Service. For services to the Fire Fighters Charity and to the community in Suffolk.
- Kathryn Cleland. Interim Ward Sister, Paediatric Outpatient Department and Short Stay Paediatric Assessment Unit, South Eastern Health and Social Care Trust. For services to Health and Social Care.
- Sarah Louise Clibbens. Participation Business Support Manager, UK Parliament. For services to the State Funeral of Her Majesty Queen Elizabeth II.
- Agnes Black Close. Chair, Baby Haven. For services to the community in Belfast.
- Geoffrey Cole. Chairman, Birmingham Trees for Life. For services to Horticulture and the Environment.
- Denzil Connick. Co-Founder and Life Vice President, South Atlantic Medal Association. For voluntary service to Falklands War Veterans.
- Paul Stuart Cording. Sergeant, North Yorkshire Police. For services to Policing and to Charity.
- Jonathan David Covey. Tree Nursery Manager, Trustee and Treasurer, Moors Trees Charity. For services to the Environment.
- Patricia Joyce Covington. For services to the community in Steeple Morden, Cambridgeshire.
- Thomas Stephen Coyle. War Pension and Armed Forces Compensation Scheme Advocate, RMA - The Royal Marines Charity. For services to Veterans and Serving Members of HM Armed Forces.
- Russell William Crispin. Firefighter, London Fire Brigade. For services to the Fire and Rescue Service and to the community in East London.
- Ian Jeffrey Cross. Customer Service Adviser, HM Revenue and Customs. For services to the Welsh Ambulance Service Trust.
  - The Honourable Harriet Mary Margaret Cullen. Trustee, Keats-Shelley Memorial Association. For services to Literature.
- Christine Ann Culleton. Lately Community Nurse, Aneurin Bevan Health Board. For services to the NHS in South East Wales.
- Mary Catherine Daly. For services to Young People and to the community in the Clogher Valley, County Tyrone.
- Jessica Davey. Youth Participant and Volunteer, Second Wave Centre for Youth Arts. For services to Young People in Deptford, London Borough of Lewisham.
- Jane De Groot. School Nurse, Woldingham School, Caterham, Surrey. For services to Nursing.
- Malcolm John Leslie Dent. For services to the community in Gosport, Hampshire.
- Dorothy Dentith. For services to Girlguiding and to the community in Congleton, Cheshire.
- Mary Jean Devon. For services to the community in Glasgow and in Argyll and Bute.
- Balbir Dhillon. Postmaster. For services to the community in Birchwood, Cheshire.
- Kuldeep Singh Dhillon. Postmaster. For services to the community in Birchwood, Cheshire.
- Judith Mary Dickins. Coach Developer and Volunteer, Riding for the Disabled Association. For services to Charity and People with Disabilities.
- Jennifer Rose Ann Didcote. Postmaster. For services to the community in Bishop's Cleeve, Gloucestershire.
- Kim Diver. Castle Steward, Hillsborough Castle, County Down. For services in Northern Ireland on the Demise of Her Majesty Queen Elizabeth II.
- Lawrence Patrick Doherty. Project Manager, Department for Work and Pensions. For services to the community in Gateshead, Tyne and Wear.
- Philippa Jade Donegan. For services to People with Disabilities and to the community in Middlesbrough, North Yorkshire, particularly during Covid-19.
- Sylvia Douglas. Founder, MsMissMrs. For services to Women in Glasgow.
- Albert Duffus. For services to Boxing, Veterans and to Charity in Inverness-shire, Aberdeenshire and Moray.
- Graeme George Duncan. Risk and Resilience Officer, Aberdeenshire Council. For services in Scotland on the Demise of Her Majesty Queen Elizabeth II.
- Richard William Wakerley Easom. For services to the community in Melton Mowbray, Leicestershire.
- Steven Paul Edney. Fundraiser, Brittle Bone Society. For services to Charity.
- Rebecca Elizabeth Sarah Edwards. For services to Rowing.
- Kenneth Eliot. Volunteer. For services to Table Tennis.
- Gareth John Elliott. For services to Lowland Rescue and to the community in Aylesbury, Buckinghamshire.
- Anthony Robert Ellis. Co-Founder, Kings Lynn Literature Festivals. For services to Literature.
- Christine Evans. Area Organiser, Dunfermline, Poppyscotland. For charitable services to Veterans.
- David Evans. Work Coach, Department for Work and Pensions. For services to the community in Scarborough, North Yorkshire.
- Kathleen Margaret Evans. Chair, Leeds Lieder. For services to the Arts.
- Barbara Ann Ewart. Lately Public Health Nurse. For services to the community in Northern Ireland.
- Vikki Ewen. For services to the community in Coquetdale, Morpeth, Northumberland.
- Sherree Fagge. Head of Nursing Palliative and End of Life Care, NHS England. For services to Healthcare.
- Marigold Jacqueline Louise Farnell-Watson. Creator and Ward Co-ordinator, Neighbourhood Watch South Richmond. For services to the Community.
- Henry Finney. Voluntary Boxing Coach. For services to Boxing and to Young People in Hyde, Greater Manchester.
- Julie Flaherty. For services to the Northern Ireland Child Funeral Fund.
- Daniel Leslie Ford. Founder, Capel Comets Youth Football Club. For services to Youth Football in Dorking, Surrey.
- Elizabeth Anne Forde. For services to Community Development in Mid-Ulster.
- Julie Ann Forrest. Honours and Protocol Manager, Scottish Government. For services in Scotland on the Demise of Her Majesty Queen Elizabeth II.
- Dr. Naomi Forrester-Soto. Reader in Vector Biology, Keele University. For services to Public Communication during Covid-19.
- Pauline Jane Franklin. Cleaning Supervisor, St Brendan's Sixth Form College, Bristol. For services to Further Education.
- Junior Jay Frood. Fundraiser and Anti-Bullying Ambassador. For services to Vulnerable Children.
- Jeffery Edward Fry. Meet and Greet Host, Waterloo Station, London, South Western Railway. For services to the Railway Industry.
- Caroline Susan Galloway. Freelance Angling Coach. For services to Young People and to Disadvantaged Communities.
- Paul Anthony Gardner. For services to the community in Hinckley, Leicestershire.
- Colin Noel Garrett. For services to Violin Making.
- Emma Justine Garrett. Head of Visitor Experience, Tate. For services to the State Funeral of Her Majesty Queen Elizabeth II.
- Christine Garrity. Founding Director and Director, Pollok Credit Union. For services to the community in Pollok, Glasgow.
- John Gault. For services to the Horticultural Industry in Northern Ireland.
- Krishna Ghosh. For services to Education and to the community in London.
- Alexander Gibson. Founder, Challenging Motor Neurone Disease. For services to Charity, particularly to People with Motor Neurone Disease.
- Susan Giles. Senior Curator, World Cultures Collection, Bristol Museum and Art Gallery. For services to UK Heritage and Museums.
- Linda Anne Gillies. Health and Wellbeing Caseworker, Decorum NI. For services to the Veterans Community in Northern Ireland.
- Deborah Mary Louise Girvan. For services to the community in County Down.
- Pamela Vanessa Glasgow Baxter. Founder AUsome Kids. For services to Children with Autism in Cookstown, County Tyrone.
- Carol Janice Veronica Godby. Drama Workshop Leader and Agent. For services to Drama and to the community in North West England.
- Jacqueline Goddard. Leader in Girlguiding, Essex South-East. For services to Young People in Essex.
- Peter William Godden. For services to Disadvantaged People and to the community in Bristol, particularly during Covid-19.
- Victoria Golding. Wildlife Rehabilitator, Kent Wildlife Trust. For services to Education, to Charity and to Animal Welfare.
- Trevor Gomes. For services to the community in the Royal Borough of Greenwich, during Covid-19.
- Gwynne Dudley Goodfield. Tax Specialist Programme Recruitment Lead, HM Revenue and Customs. For services to Graduate Recruitment and to Sport.
- Gillian Margaret Gough. For services to Education in County Armagh.
- Caroline Helen Grasmeder. Deputy Head, Operations and Assurance, Cabinet Office. For services to the State Funeral of Her Majesty Queen Elizabeth II.
- Edwin John Gray. For services to Choral Music in Northern Ireland.
- Andrew Michael Green. Physical Education Teacher, New College Pontefract, West Yorkshire. For services to Sport and to Education.
- John Leslie Stuart Griffiths. Coach, Swansea Harriers Athletics Club. For services to Athletics in Wales.
- Kay Lois Grimshaw. Swimming Coach. For services to Swimming and to the community in the London Borough of Lewisham.
- Ronald George Groves. For services to the community in Chale, Isle of Wight.
- Gillian Hagen. For services to the community in Blidworth, Nottinghamshire.
- Patrick Joseph Halpin. District Events Lead, St John Ambulance. For services to the State Funeral of Her Majesty Queen Elizabeth II.
- Veronica Hammersley. School Crossing Patrol Officer. For services to the community in Glengormley, County Antrim.
- Caroline Handley. For services to Refugees and to the community in Ledbury, Herefordshire.
- Mark Andrew Hanna. For voluntary services to the community in County Londonderry.
- Alison Marie Hanscomb. Station Manager, Slough, Great Western Railway. For services to the State Funeral of Her Majesty Queen Elizabeth II.
- Kathryn Elizabeth Harley. Specialist in Paediatric Dentistry. For services to Paediatric Dentistry and Dental Education.
- David Harling. Deputy Director, Learning Disability Nursing, NHS England. For services to the NHS, People with Learning Disabilities, and to Autistic People and their Families.
- Dr. Colin Norman Harris. For services to the community in Solihull, West Midlands.
- Karen Anne Harris. Police Staff, Citizens in Policing, East Regional Coordinator and Suffolk Manager, Suffolk Constabulary. For services to Policing.
- Dominic Peter Harrison. Lately Director, Public Health, Blackburn with Darwen Borough Council. For+ services to Vulnerable People in Lancashire.
- Patricia Mary Harrison. For services to the community in Chipperfield, Hertfordshire, particularly during Covid-19.
- Reginald David Harrison. For services to Disadvantaged Young People and to the community in Merseyside.
- Karolynne Anne Hart. Cultural and Arts Programme Manager, Gateshead Libraries. For services to Public Libraries and to the Arts.
- Magdalena Harvey. Director, Polish White Eagle Appeal. For services to Ukrainian Refugees and the Provision of Humanitarian Aid to the People of Ukraine.
- Carole Angela Hayes. School Crossing Patrol Officer, Cambridgeshire County Council. For voluntary and charitable services in St Neots, Cambridgeshire.
- Lindsay Martin Hedmann. Trampolining Coach. For services to Trampolining.
- Alan Christopher Henshaw. Team Leader, Environment Agency National Coarse Fish Farm. For services to the Environment and to Freshwater Fisheries.
- James Austin Hetherington. For voluntary services to Police Officers in Northern Ireland.
- Georgina Hewes. Volunteer and Fundraiser, The Children's Society. For charitable services to Children and Young People.
- Angela Eugenie Hewitt. Founder Trustee, Naturezones. For services to Nature Conservation and Education.
- Katrina Louise Susannah Hicks Beach. Director of Volunteer-led Services, Mindsong and Trustee, Summerfield Charitable Trust. For services to Charity, to Music and to the community in Coln St Aldwyns, Gloucestershire.
- Christopher David Hingley. Lately Head of Visitor Experience, Tate. For services to the State Funeral of Her Majesty Queen Elizabeth II.
- Peter John Hollely. Regional Event Operations Lead, St John Ambulance. For services to the State Funeral of Her Majesty Queen Elizabeth II.
- Louie Carullo Horne. Deputy Associate Director of Nursing, East Suffolk and North Essex NHS Foundation Trust and NHS Workforce Race Equality Standard Clinical Research Fellow. For services to Nursing.
- Christine Horton. Controller and Housekeeper, Bryngwyn Hall. For services to Heritage and to Charity in Wales.
- Gary Raymond Howes. For services to Table Tennis, Young People and to the community in Tunbridge Wells, Kent.
- Amber Kate Hughes. Military Transport Road Safety and Assurance Manager, Ministry of Defence. For services to the community in Oxfordshire.
- Winsome Andrea Hull. Senior Business Strategy Manager, Transport for London. For services to Transport in London and to Diversity and Inclusion.
- Lilian Hunter. For services to the community in Ingatestone, Essex.
- Guy Melvin Hurst. President, Basingstoke Astronomical Society. For services to Amateur Astronomy.
- Simon Kenneth Hylands. Founder, Building Bridges Community Arts Theatre, Lurgan. For services to the Arts and to the community in County Armagh.
- Joan Helen Ikel. Coach. For services to Archery in Essex and the London Borough of Redbridge.
- Genevieve Ann Irvine. Founder, SWELL - Supported We Live Life. For services to People Affected by Cancer in County Fermanagh.
- Patricia Jeal. For services to the community in Higham, Kent.
- Sally Jane Johnson. Founder, The Harry Johnson Trust. For charitable services to People with Cancer.
- Sian Margaret Johnson. For services to Squash in Wales.
- Archibald Buchanan Johnston. For services to the community in Cockenzie and Port Seton, East Lothian.
- Julia Frances Jones. Co-Founder, John's Campaign. For services to People with Dementia.
- Sandra Margaret Jones. Badminton Coach. For services to Badminton and to the community in Dorset.
- Imogen Melissa Joss. For services to the community in Gloucestershire.
- Stephen Lionel Judd. Police Constable and Leader, Essex Volunteer Police Cadets, Essex Police. For services to Policing and to Young People.
- Dr. Martin Kapel. For services to Holocaust Education and Remembrance.
- Dorothy Joyce Kay. Volunteer, Citizens' Advice, Elmbridge West. For services to Employment Advice.
- Sister Nuala Kelly. For services to the community in Belfast.
- Lynette Kennedy. Nurse Consultant, Learning Disability, Camden Learning Disability Service, London Borough of Camden. For services to People with Learning Disabilities.
- Aaron William Kerr. For services to Disability Awareness and to Assisted Running in the United Kingdom.
- Oyovwe Sagbodje Kigho. Founder and Chief Executive Officer, Widows Empowerment Trust. For services to Bereaved People in Manchester.
- Kay Christian King. Principal, Young England Kindergarten, Pimlico, City of Westminster. For services to Early Years Education.
- Anthony Charles Kingston. Scorer. For services to Cricket.
- Paul Colin Kirby. Quality Improvement Adviser, Care Quality Commission. For services to Health and Social Care.
- Barry Albert Kitchener. For services to Railway Heritage.
- Dr. Priya Kumar. General Practitioner, Kumar Medical Centre, Slough. For services to Health Improvement in South East England.
- Ernest Randolf Langford. Fundraiser, St Michael's Hospice, Herefordshire. For services to Charity.
- Lawrence Langton. Forest Craftsperson, Forestry England. For services to Forestry.
- Stuart James Langworthy. Manager, England Over 60s Walking Football Team. For services to Association Football and Walking Football.
- Gillian Lauder. Hairdresser. For services to the community in Grangemouth, Stirlingshire.
- Sandra Lawrence. Founder and Director, Cornwall Accessible Activities Programme. For services to Families with Disabled Children and Young People.
- Robert Lewis. Special Inspector, South Wales Police Special Constabulary. For services to Policing.
- Colette Elizabeth Lock. For services to the community in Warrenpoint, County Down.
- Jeanne Louise Long. Founder, Happy Handbag. For charitable services to Disadvantaged People in Bristol, Gloucestershire and Swindon.
- Elaine Lowe. For services to the community in Marske-on-Sea, North Yorkshire.
- Tara Mackings. For services to the community in Tyne and Wear, particularly during Covid-19.
- Helen Elaine Maguire. For services to the community in Claygate, Surrey.
- Kailash Malhotra. Peer Educator Volunteer, Kidney Research UK. For services to Kidney Organ Donation for Minority Ethnic Groups.
- Linda Frances Matthews. Lately Director, Yateley Industries for the Disabled Ltd and Chief Executive Officer, Careers Development Group, WISE Ability. For services to Charity and to People with Disabilities.
- Anthony McAllister. Football Coach. For services to Association Football and to Young People in Manchester.
- Paul William McBride. For services to the community in Lisburn, County Antrim.
- Angela Teresa McCann. Head of Community Services, Lisburn and Castlereagh City Council. For services in Northern Ireland on the Demise of Her Majesty Queen Elizabeth II.
- Dawn McConnell. For services to Cancer Patients in Northern Ireland.
- Anne McCormack. Chair, Broke not Broken. For services to Disadvantaged People in Kinross, particularly during Covid-19.
- Anne McCreadie. For services to the community in Merkinch, Inverness.
- Patrick Gerald McCullough. Campus Food and Drink, Queen's University Belfast. For services to Higher Education in Northern Ireland.
- Catherine Frances McCully. Trustee, Cobbes Meadow Group, Riding for the Disabled Association. For services to Charity and to People with Disabilities in Canterbury, Kent.
- John Mark McDowell. For services to the community in Slough, Berkshire.
- Lynnette McElheron. For services to Vulnerable People and to the community in Newton Abbot, Devon.
- Jean Patricia McGrogan. For services to Young Women in Northern Ireland.
- Catriona Marcia McLuckie. Chair, Original Richmond Business and Tourism Association. For services to the Environment and to the community in Richmond, North Yorkshire.
- Alexander Blackburn McMenemy. For voluntary service to the Scottish Schools Football Association and to the Scottish Football Association.
- Roberta Ann McMullan. Leader and Treasurer, 2nd Benburb Boys' Brigade. For services to Young People in County Tyrone and County Armagh.
- Tracey Elizabeth McNickle. Project Coordinator, Carrick Connect. For services to Young People and to the community in Carrickfergus, County Antrim.
- Frank Meakin. Scout Leader, 59th Newchapel Scouts. For services to Young People in Stoke-on-Trent.
- Ina Lesley Melville. Unit Leader, Smithton Girlguides. For services to Young People and to the community in Smithton, Inverness-shire.
- Andrew Chisholm Melvin. Lately Pipe Major, Williamwood Pipe Band and Founder, Piping Services Scotland. For services to Traditional Music and to the community in Glasgow.
- Dr. Aruna Mene. Artist. For services to Fabric Art, to Charity and to Sustainability.
- Katy Anne Merrington. Cultural Gardener, The Hepworth Wakefield. For services to the Arts and to the community in Wakefield, West Yorkshire.
- Marion Lynn Micklewright. Founder and Manager, Shropshire Cat Rescue. For services to Feline Welfare.
- Claire Miller. Senior Public Safety Officer, City of Edinburgh Council. For services in Scotland on the Demise of Her Majesty Queen Elizabeth II.
- Jonathan Cartmell Miller. For services to Charity in Scotland.
- Mohammad Mirza. Caseworker, HM Revenue and Customs. For services to Mental Health.
- Dr. Wendy Patricia Mitchell. Member, York Minds and Voices, Dementia Engagement and Empowerment Project. For services to People Living with Dementia.
- Judith Monk. Chair, The Hastings and Rother YMCA. For services to Disadvantaged Young People in East Sussex.
- Dorothy Ann Moore. School Secretary, Crumlin Integrated Primary School. For services to Education in County Antrim.
- Lynne Morgan. President, Ashford Middlesex Hockey Club. For services to Hockey.
- Maureen Morrison. President, Arbroath Fundraising Guild. For voluntary services to the Royal National Lifeboat Institution in Arbroath, Angus.
- Emma Muldoon. Founder and Chief Executive, Simply Emma. For services to Disabled People.
- Martin Francis Mulholland. Head Concierge, Europa Hotel, Belfast. For services to Tourism and to Hospitality in Northern Ireland.
- Kenneth Edgar Munday. For services to Charity and to the community in Westfield, East Sussex.
- Alan Victor Naylor. Group Scout Leader, 10th North Leeds (Grammar School At Leeds) Scout Group. For services to Young People.
- John Anthony Newbould. For voluntary services to Ecological Surveying and Data Collection.
- Heather Elizabeth Newton. For services to the community in Crewe and Nantwich, Cheshire.
- Laura Jane Newton-Harris. For services to the community in Ellesmere Port, Cheshire.
- Terasa Newton-Harris. For services to the community in Ellesmere Port, Cheshire.
- Denis Nicholl. For services to the Boys' Brigade in Northern Ireland.
- Jane-Elizabeth Nolan. Trustee, Anfield Sports and Community Centre. For services to Young People and to the community in Liverpool.
- Ann Elizabeth Norman. Lately Professional Lead for Criminal Justice and Learning Disabilities, Royal College of Nursing. For services to Healthcare Access.
- Joan Mary Norman. Scout Leader, 1st Eye Scout Group. For services to Young People and to the community in Suffolk.
- Suzanne Jayne Oldnall. Domestic Abuse Advocate. For services to the Victims of Domestic Abuse.
- Simon Timothy Graham Otter. For services to the community in Wimbledon, London Borough of Merton, particularly during Covid-19.
- Rebecca Oyeyemi Oyelami. Senior Programme Manager, Policy and Programme Management, Cabinet Office. For services to the State Funeral of Her Majesty Queen Elizabeth II.
- Dr. Andrew Paul Padmore. Artistic Director and Conductor, Yorkshire Philharmonic Choir. For services to Music.
- Barry Arnold Palmer. Head of Safety and Security, Tate. For services to the State Funeral of Her Majesty Queen Elizabeth II.
- Hetalban Mayank Patel. Compliance and Investigation Officer, HM Revenue and Customs. For services to Homeless People in Newcastle upon Tyne.
- Virendra Mahendrakumar Patel. Technical Support Partner, John Lewis and Partners. For services to the community in Hampshire.
- Dr. Ian Pattison. Lately Chair, NHS Sunderland Clinical Commissioning Group. For services to the NHS.
- Corina Antonette Pearce. Programme and Policy Manager, Land Transport National Security, Department for Transport. For services to the State Funeral of Her Majesty Queen Elizabeth II.
- Teresa Maryann Pearson. Station Manager, Staines and Windsor and Eton Riverside, South Western Railway. For services to the State Funeral of Her Majesty Queen Elizabeth II.
- Rolf Penzias. For services to Holocaust Remembrance and Education.
- Reginald Roy Pierce. Lately Chair, Business Radio Council, Federation of Communication Services. For services to Business and Radio Communications.
- Dr. Lewis Thomas Potter. Founder, Geeky Medics and GP Registrar. For services to Higher Education and to Medicine.
- Peter Solomon Quigley. For voluntary services to the community in Belfast.
- Sally Ann Ralston. Community Engagement Manager, Merseyrail. For services to the Rail Industry and to Charity in the Liverpool City Region.
- Paul Martin Reeves. Head of Nursing for Education and New Roles, NHS England. For services to Nursing.
- Ronald Thomas Richards. Secretary, South West Volleyball Association. For services to Volleyball and to the community in South West England
- Judith Ann Richardson. Lifeboat Press Officer, Dungeness Lifeboat Station, Royal National Lifeboat Institution. For services to Maritime Safety.
- Lydia Catherine Riding. Deputy Head of Programme Management, Cabinet Office. For services to the State Funeral of Her Majesty Queen Elizabeth II.
- Suzanne Ripton. For services to Holocaust Education and Remembrance.
- Victoria Robertson. Founder and Chief Executive, Kaleidoscopic UK. For services to Victims of Domestic Violence and to Refugees.
- Julia Robinson. For services to Public Libraries and to the community in North East England.
- Margaret Elizabeth Robinson. For services to the Girlguiding Movement in Northern Ireland.
- Thomas Pringle Robson. Fundraiser. For charitable services to the community in Newcastle upon Tyne.
- Hilary Rodgers. For services to Homeless People and the community in Kettering, Northamptonshire, particularly during Covid-19.
- Dr. Paul Francis Rodgers. For services to Homeless People and the community in Kettering, Northamptonshire, particularly during Covid-19.
- Margaret Mary Rooney. Business Support Officer, Patient and Client Support Services, Belfast Health and Social Care Trust. For services to Health and Social Care.
- Mandy Rowlatt. Head of Prosecutions, Northamptonshire Police. For services to Policing.
- Sandra Louise Ruddock. Co-Founder and Owner, Scarlett & Mustard Ltd. For services to Business and to the Voluntary Sector in Norfolk and Suffolk.
- Louise Russell. Founder and Chief Executive, Give a Dog a Bone....and an Animal a Home. For services to Charity and to Tackling Loneliness and Isolation in Older People in Scotland.
- Lynva Jane Russell. For services to the Environment in West Yorkshire.
- Christopher Robin Rutt. For services to the community in Kilve, Somerset.
- Sunethie Salig. For services to Law Enforcement and to Diversity.
- Jonathan Paul Sanderson. For services to Athletics and to the community in Telford and The Wrekin, Shropshire.
- Michael Frederick Arnold Sayer. For services to the community in Bodham, Norfolk.
- Joe Seddon. Founder, Zero Gravity. For services to Social Mobility.
- Nanar Setrakian. Strategy and Protocol Project Manager, Cabinet Office. For services to the State Funeral of Her Majesty Queen Elizabeth II.
- Elaine Shallcross. Pickleball Player, Coach, Administrator and International Federation of Pickleball Ambassador. For services to Pickleball.
- Maurice Grahme Shearer. For services to the community through the YMCA in Carrickfergus, County Antrim.
- Lucy Jessica Shuker. Paralympic Wheelchair Tennis Player. For services to Sport.
- Yasmin Sidhwa. Founder and Director, Mandala Theatre Company. For services to Drama.
- Mark Simpson. Lately Head of Public Enquiry Service, House of Lords. For services to Parliament.
- Jeanette Anita Sloan. For services to Knitwear Design and to Diversity in the Fine Arts.
- Bryan Frederick Smith. Coach. For services to Athletics.
- Eric Smith. For services to Radio and to the community in Shropshire.
- James Leslie Smith. Researcher. For voluntary service to Veterans of the Cyprus Emergency and their Families.
- John Desmond Smith. For services to Music and to Charity.
- Kim Lorraine Smith. For services to the community in Winshill, Staffordshire, particularly during Covid-19.
- George Stables. Boxing Coach and Official. For services to Amateur Boxing in Devon.
- David John Stallard. For services to Mental Health in the Scottish Highlands.
- Royston Esler Starkey. For services to Mineralogy.
- Paul Stead. Leader, 9th Doncaster Scout Group. For services to Young People in Doncaster, South Yorkshire.
- Frank Dermott Stevens. For voluntary services to Swimming in Northern Ireland.
- Gordon Brodie Stewart. Organist, Teacher and Conductor. For services to Music.
- Susan Stone. For services to Education.
- Charles Edwin Summers. Director, Volunteer and Project Manager, Lynton and Barnstaple Railway Trust. For services to Heritage.
- Geoffrey Bruce Sword. Lately Chair, Summerseat Players. For services to Drama and to the community in Greater Manchester and East Lancashire.
- Elizabeth Tait. Emergency Response Volunteer, British Red Cross. For services to the State Funeral of Her Majesty Queen Elizabeth II.
- Shula Anita Joan Tajima. Director, Windsor and Maidenhead Youth and Community Counselling Service. For services to the community in Berkshire.
- David William Tarr. For services to Ashton Keynes Primary School and to the community in Ashton Keynes, Wiltshire.
- Jane Tattam. Founder and Lately Chair, Needed Urgent Remedial and Surgical Equipment Charity. For services to Fundraising for the NHS and to the community in Beverley, East Riding of Yorkshire.
- Tracey Sandra Tatum. Lately Manager, Mill View Care Home, Bradford, West Yorkshire. For services to People with Dementia.
- Ernest Reginald Telford. For services to the Somme Nursing Home, Belfast during Covid-19.
- Jaime Terese Eastham Thurston. Founder and Chief Executive Officer, 52 Lives. For services to Charity.
- Trudi Elin Togneri. Lately Senior Technician, Stirling High School. For services to Young People and to the community in Stirling.
- Katy Turner. Lately Senior Carer, Caring Connections. For services to Social Care during Covid-19.
- Dr. Trevor Charles Tween. Ecologist, Luton Borough Council. For services to Conservation and Wildlife.
- Roy Tyzack. For services to the community in Brentwood, Essex.
- Dr. Rosemary Stacy Waddy. District Logistics Officer, St John Ambulance. For services to the State Funeral of Her Majesty Queen Elizabeth II.
- Claudia Helen Walker. Member, Group Executive Committee, 1st Keswick Scout Group. For services to Young People in Cumbria.
- Jane Elizabeth Walker. President, Edinburgh, Lothian and Fife, British Red Cross. For voluntary service to the Red Cross.
- Kendal Walker. Team Leader, Ministry of Defence. For services to Defence.
- Selwyn Richard Sykes Walker. For services to the community in Preston Candover, Hampshire.
- Eleanor Walsh. Swimming Coach. For services to Swimming and to the community in Cockermouth, Cumbria.
- Clive Edward Frank Waterman. For services to the Reading Male Voice Choir and to Charity.
- Ernest Anthony Watson. Chair, Saffron Walden Museum Society. For services to Heritage and to the community in Saffron Walden, Essex.
- Hilary Maude Weedon. For services to Movement, Dance and Exercise.
- Salomon Jacques Weisser. For services to the Jewish Community and to Holocaust Remembrance.
- Leslie Roy Welling. For services to the community in Devizes, Wiltshire.
- Emma Wells. Founder, Riverside Rebels Running Club. For services to Fitness and to the community in Walton-on-Thames, Surrey.
- Matthew Wennington. Security Operations Manager, Prime Minister's Office. For services to the State Funeral of Her Majesty Queen Elizabeth II.
- Michael Graham Wheeler. Dental Hygienist and Dental Workforce Lead Tutor, Health Education England. For services to Oral Health in South West England.
- Steven Wilcock. For services to the community in Trawden, Lancashire.
- Joan Isobel Dean Willett. Fundraiser. For services to Charity, particularly during Covid-19.
- Jonathan Mark Williams. Senior Engagement and Protocol Manager, Cabinet Office. For services to the State Funeral of Her Majesty Queen Elizabeth II.
- Jacqueline Wilson. Founder, Save Our Hedgehogs. For services to Wildlife Rehabilitation.
- Mildred Wiltshire. Chief Marshall Coordinator, British Motorsport. For services to Motorsport.
- Andrew Wing. For services to the community in Gosport, Hampshire.
- Anne Wingate. For services to Beekeeping.
- Reverend Stephen Paul Wood. Minister, Newport Pagnell Baptist Church. For services to Refugees in Milton Keynes, Buckinghamshire.
- George Sydney Wright. President, Stafford Branch, Royal British Legion. For voluntary services to Veterans in Staffordshire.
- Dr. Duncan Alan Wynn. For services to the community in Worcestershire.
- Catherine Margaret Wynne. Volunteer International Technical Official, International Canoe Federation and European Canoe Association. For services to Sport.
- Mark Peter Younger. For services to the community in Parsons Green, London Borough of Hammersmith and Fulham.
- Salma Bano Zulfiqar. For services to Art and to Education

=== Royal Red Cross ===
Royal Red Cross ribbon

==== Members of the Royal Red Cross (RRC) ====
- Commander Karen McCullough, Queen Alexandra’s Royal Naval Nursing Service, X027033B.

==== Associates of the Royal Red Cross (ARRC) ====
- Staff Sergeant Lindsey Anne Collinson, Queen Alexandra’s Royal Army Nursing Corps, Q1050931.
- Flight Sergeant Anita Rosemary Wiejak, Royal Air Force, F8506557

=== King's Police Medal (KPM) ===
King's Police Medal ribbon

England and Wales

- Amanda Jane Blakeman. Chief Constable, North Wales Police.
- Adrian Charles Cafe. Constable, Thames Valley Police.
- Susannah Clarke. Lately Detective Chief Superintendent, Lancashire Constabulary.
- Paul Jonathon Denaro. Lately Detective Inspector, West Midlands Police.
- Joanna Edwards. Lately Superintendent, Metropolitan Police Service.
- Nicholas Brian Elton. Lately Chief Inspector, Hampshire & Isle of Wight Constabulary.
- Daniel Fleming. Constable, Humberside Police.
- Garry Mark Forsyth. Lately Chief Constable, Bedfordshire Police.
- Redouane Haddouch. Constable, Metropolitan Police Service.
- Emily-Jane Higham. Chief Superintendent, Greater Manchester Police.
- Stephen Michael Jupp. Chief Constable, National Police Chiefs' Council.
- Wendy Keepin. Lately Inspector, Gwent Police.
- Serena Margaret Kennedy. Chief Constable, Merseyside Police.
- Andrew Nimmo. Detective Sergeant, Metropolitan Police Service.
- Bernard Declan O'Reilly. Deputy Chief Constable, Sussex Police and College of Policing.
- Mark Graham Porter. Constable, Metropolitan Police Service.
- Emanuel Nathaniel Samuel. Constable, Devon and Cornwall Police.
- David Sturman. Lately Chief Superintendent, West Midlands Police.

Northern Ireland

- Darrin Jones. Chief Superintendent, Police Service of Northern Ireland.
- Kellie Janine McMillan. Superintendent, Police Service of Northern Ireland.
- Valarie Elizabeth Robinson. Constable, Police Service of Northern Ireland.

=== King's Fire Service Medal (KFSM) ===
King's Fire Service Medal ribbon

- Donna Joanne Bentley, MBE. Head of Strategic Safeguarding, Essex County Fire and Rescue Service.
- Roderic Andrew Hammerton. Lately Chief Fire Officer, Shropshire Fire and Rescue Service.
- Peter Patrick Heath. Deputy Chief Fire Officer, Tyne and Wear Fire and Rescue Service.
- Gavin Andrew Tomlinson. Chief Fire Officer, Derbyshire Fire and Rescue Service.

=== King's Ambulance Service Medal (KAM) ===
King's Ambulance Service Medal ribbon

England and Wales

- Jason Christian Graham Killens. Chief Executive Officer, Welsh Ambulance Service.
- Professor John William Martin. Chief Paramedic and Quality Officer, London Ambulance Service.

Northern Ireland

- Brian Joseph Maguire. Paramedic, Northern Ireland Ambulance Service.

Crown Dependencies

- Jason Charles Hamon. Head of Emergency Planning, Resilience and Operational Support, States of Jersey Ambulance Service.

=== King's Volunteer Reserves Medal (KVRM) ===
King's Volunteer Reserves Medal ribbon

- Warrant Officer Class 2 Craig Blaney, V.R., Royal Regiment of Artillery, Army Reserve, 24761035.
- Captain David Gary Burgess, V.R., The Royal Logistic Corps, Army Reserve, 560517.
- Colonel David Ronald McNeil, T.D., V.R., Army Reserve, 522184.
- Warrant Officer Class 2 Lee Jay Shaw, V.R., Corps of Royal Engineers, Army Reserve, 24562013.
- Flight Lieutenant Graham John Blackburn, Royal Air Force, 5205740P.
- Air Specialist Class 1 Westley Whyte, Royal Air Force, D2641852.

== Crown Dependencies ==
Guernsey

- Richard McMahon Knight Bachelor
- David Warr OBE
- Alan Gough MBE
- Kevin Adams BEM

Jersey

- Jason Hamon MBE
- Jennifer Bridge MBE
- William Harris MBE
- Stuart Crossan silver Royal Victorian Medal

Isle of Man

- David McLean MBE
- Stuart McKenzie MBE
- Wendy McDowell BEM

== Australia ==
The 2023 King's Birthday Honours for Australia was announced on 11 June 2023 by the Governor-General, David Hurley.

== New Zealand ==
The 2023 Birthday and Coronation Honours for New Zealand were announced on 5 June 2023 by the Governor-General, Dame Cindy Kiro.

== Cook Islands ==
Below are the individuals appointed by Charles III in his right as King of the Realm of New Zealand, on the advice of His Majesty's Cook Islands Ministers.

=== Most Excellent Order of the British Empire ===
Civil division ribbon

==== Officer of the Order of the British Empire (OBE) ====
civil

- Dr. Teariki Noovao. For services to Health, to the Public and to the Community in the Cook Islands.

==== Member of the Order of the British Empire (MBE) ====
Civil

- Tearea. For services to the Public and the Community.

=== British Empire Medal ===
British Empire Medal ribbon

- William George Doherty. For services to Business and to the community.
- Christopher Earle Vaile. For services to Business and to the community.

== The Bahamas ==
Below are the individuals appointed by Charles III in his right as King of the Bahamas, on the advice of His Majesty's Bahamas Ministers.

=== Most Distinguished Order of St Michael and St George ===
Order of St Michael and St George ribbon

==== Companion of St Michael and St George (CMG) ====
- Warren Logan Rolle. For services to the Public.

=== Most Excellent Order of the British Empire ===
Civil division ribbon

==== Commander of the Order of the British Empire (CBE) ====
Civil

- Neko Grant. For services to Politics.

==== Officer of the Order of the British Empire (OBE) ====
Civil

- Austin Bernard Davis. For services to the Community.
- Periciles Maillis. For services to the Environment.

==== Member of the Order of the British Empire (MBE) ====
Civil

- Andrea Elizabeth Eyvonne Archer. For services to the Public.
- Thomas Maitland Cates. For services to the Community.
- Colin Higgs. For services to the Public.

=== British Empire Medal ===
British Empire Medal ribbon

- Bonnie Basden. For services to Sport.
- Clayton Curtis. For services to Culture.
- Edison Alric Dames. For services to Culture.
- Frederick Kendal Taylor. For services to Sport.

=== King's Police Medal (KPM) ===
King's Police Medal ribbon

- Leamond Deleveaux, Deputy Commissioner, The Royal Bahamas Police Force.

== Grenada ==
Below are the individuals appointed by Charles III in his right as King of Grenada, on the advice of His Majesty's Grenada Ministers.

=== Most Excellent Order of the British Empire ===
Civil division ribbon

==== Commander of the Order of the British Empire (CBE) ====
Civil

- Tillman Thomas. For services to Grenada.

==== Officer of the Order of the British Empire (OBE) ====
Civil

- Augustine Jeffrey. For services to Culture.
- Paul Phillip. For services to Sport.

==== Member of the Order of the British Empire (MBE) ====
Civil

- Pasupuleti Gita Kishore Kumar. For services to Business.
- Kimberlain Mills. For services to Culture.

== Papua New Guinea ==
Below are the individuals appointed by Charles III in his right as King of Papua New Guinea, on the advice of His Majesty's Papua New Guinea Ministers.

=== Knight Bachelor ===
Knight Bachelor ribbon

- Paul Kurai. For services to the Catholic Church and to the community in Enga.

=== Most Distinguished Order of St Michael and St George ===
Order of St Michael and St George ribbon

==== Knight Commander of St Michael and St George (KCMG) ====
- The Honourable Christopher Sevese Haiveta, C.M.G., For Political and Public Service.

==== Companion of St Michael and St George (CMG) ====
- The Honourable Kerenga Kua, M.P., For services to the Legal Sector.
- David Ruma Wereh. For public service in Road Construction and Rehabilitation.

=== Most Excellent Order of the British Empire ===
Civil division ribbon

==== Knight/Dame Commander of the Order of the British Empire (KBE/DBE) ====
Civil

- Monica Esther Salter. For services to Business and to the Community.
- Robin Gerard Fleming. For services to the Community and to the Banking Sector.

==== Commander of the Order of the British Empire (CBE) ====
Civil

- David John Ellery. For services to Business and to the Community.
- Augustine Sanga Mano. For services to the Public, to the Energy Industry and to Mining.
- Anthony James Seeto. For services to Business and to the Community.
- Kanankege Hemasiri Wickramaratne, O.B.E., For public service in Road Construction and Rehabilitation.

==== Officer of the Order of the British Empire (OBE) ====
Civil

- Isu Aluvula, B.E.M., For services to the Community and to Religion.
- Colin James Calvert. For services to the Community through Rural Health.
- David Stuart Doig. For services to the Printing Industry.
- Dr. Uke Nintepa Wikai Kombra. For public service in Education.
- Billy Huaan Lin. For services to Business and to the Community.

==== Member of the Order of the British Empire (MBE) ====
Civil

- Pastor John Avawangi Apami. For services to Religion and to the Community.
- Darius Bobo. For services to Education.
- Gari Dogodo. For services to the people of Central Province and National Capital District.
- Leong Chye Ho. For services to Business, to the Community and to Public Service.
- Waso Ipopi. For services to the Community and to Health.
- Harry Jacob, Bishop, The United Church in Papua New Guinea. For services to Religion and to the Community.
- Konga John. For services to Business.
- Jon Stuart Macindoe. For services to Business and to the Community.
- Alphonse Kapi Malipu. For services to Teaching.
- Issac Nopura Meya. For public service in the Southern Highlands Provincial Administration.
- The Reverend Joseph Porel Pandukwasi. For services to Religion and to the Community.
- Kevin Pullen. For public service, especially on Bougainville matters.
- Kongo Roke. For public service in the Southern Highlands Provincial Administration.
- Nirmal Singh. For Public Service.
- Philip Charles Stace. For services to Business and to the Insurance Industry.
- Andrew Michael Watson. For Public Service.
- Kikila Yavase. For Public Service.

=== British Empire Medal (BEM) ===
British Empire Medal ribbon

- Sister Anna Anda. For services to Rural Health.
- Pamenda Emba. For Public Service.
- Alphonse Kanowi. For services to Education.
- Takuna Mapi. For Public Service.
- Topa Mata. For services to the Community.
- Yoanes Olesu. Ward Councillor and Village Elder. For services to the Community.
- Sale Poporo. For Public Service.
- Henry Purel. For services to Education in the Southern Highlands Province.
- Mary Rema. For services to Education.
- George Rombo A. For services to Religion and to the Community.
- Augustine Tipale. For services to the Community.
- George Wali. For Public Service.

== Solomon Islands ==
Below are the individuals appointed by Charles III in his right as King of Solomon Islands, on the advice of His Majesty's Solomon Islands Ministers.

=== Most Excellent Order of the British Empire ===
==== Officer of the Order of the British Empire (OBE) ====
- Joseph Hutaiwairaha. For services to the Public and to the community in the field of Education.

=== British Empire Medal (BEM) ===
- Stephen Henguaiku Malie. For services to the community in the field of Education and Health.

=== King's Police Medal (KPM) ===
- John Wesley Matamaru. For services to the Public and to the community in the field of Policing.
- Ian Harara Vaevaso, Deputy Commissioner, The Royal Solomon Islands Police Force. For services to the Public and to the community in the field of Policing.

== Saint Lucia ==
Below are the individuals appointed by Charles III in his right as King of Saint Lucia, on the advice of His Majesty's Saint Lucia Ministers.

=== Most Distinguished Order of St Michael and St George ===
Order of St Michael and St George ribbon

==== Companion of St Michael and St George (CMG) ====
- Gabriel Malzaire, The Most Reverend the Archbishop of Castries. For services to Community Development.

=== Most Excellent Order of the British Empire ===
Civil division ribbon

==== Officer of the Order of the British Empire (OBE) ====
Civil

- Gabriel Barry Prospere. For services to Business Enterprise and Development.
- Bonnie Lawrence Zephirin. For services to Community Development.

==== Member of the Order of the British Empire (MBE) ====
Civil

- Samuel Decaille. For humanitarian service in the field of Sport.
- Paul Raymond Vaughn Louis-Fernand. For humanitarian service in Education and Commerce.
- Dr. Linda Patricia Lucombe. For Humanitarian Service.
- Amalraj Thomas Penigilapadi. For Humanitarian Service.

=== British Empire Medal ===
British Empire Medal ribbon

- Stephen Augustin. For services to Music and the Arts.
- Carola Henry. For Humanitarian Service.
- Cuthbert Walter James. For services to the Community, to Music and the Arts.
- Gregor Graff Philgence. For Humanitarian Service

== Belize ==
Below are the individuals appointed by Charles III in his right as King of Belize, on the advice of His Majesty's Belize Ministers.

=== Most Excellent Order of the British Empire ===
Civil division ribbon

==== Member of the Order of the British Empire (MBE) ====
Civil

- Tseng Hoei Ying. For services to the Community.

== See also ==
- Australian honours system
- New Zealand royal honours system
- Orders, decorations, and medals of the United Kingdom
- 2023 Canadian honours
