= Mr Whoppit =

Donald Campbell's Teddy Bear

- Mr Whoppit in the cockpit with Campbell at Lake Eyre in 1964
- Team: BP
- Description: Teddy bear

Mr Whoppit was the teddy bear mascot of Donald Campbell, the land and water speed record holder. Writing in his 2011 book, Donald Campbell: The Man Behind The Mask, journalist David Tremayne described Whoppit as Campbell's "magic talisman".

As was his father Sir Malcolm Campbell, Donald Campbell was highly superstitious. Both consulted spiritualist mediums and fortune tellers, Donald also placed his faith in a lucky mascot, Mr Whoppit. He refused to drive unless Whoppit was with him. One of his wife Tonia Bern-Campbell's tasks was to hand Whoppit to him on entering the cockpit. Whoppit was noted in 2003 by reporter Frank Bennett as being part of the "threesome" arriving for the 1964 record run – the others being Campbell himself, and his wife. Bennett remarked that the mascot was in the cockpit each time, along with other memorabilia.

Whoppit was with Campbell at the time of his serious crash during a land-speed record attempt at the Bonneville Salt Flats in 1960, driving the Proteus Bluebird. After the crash, Mr.Whoppit was given to Campbell in the hospital. "Great comfort, old Whoppit" he said before falling asleep.

Campbell died as a result of a crash while driving his jet hydroplane Bluebird K7 in a record attempt on Coniston in 1967. Immediately following the crash, his body was not recovered, although Mr Whoppit floated free and was found by Leo Villa. Campbell's body was finally located and recovered in 2001.

Campbell also named one of his dogs 'Whoppit'. Another teddy bear mascot was found as a 'wife' for Whoppit, named 'Mrs Whacko', who did not ride with Whoppit but stayed with Tonia and the pit crew.

== Mr Whoppit's origins ==
'Woppit' first appeared as a cartoon strip 'The story of Woppit' about a toy teddy bear, from the first issue of the comic Robin in 1953. In 1956, Merrythought manufactured a 9-inch tall Woppit bear wearing a red felt jacket and one of these was given to Donald by his close friend and manager Peter Barker.

I used to be on the edge of the toy trade when I was at Hulton's because we used to do what was called licensed merchandise for children's comics. Whoppit was a sample from a firm called Merrythought. I had it for a long time on my desk and in 1956, I think, I said, "Don, you ought to have a mascot. I think this one is very appropriate." And he said, "Oh, fine, fine." After that, Whoppit was always there.

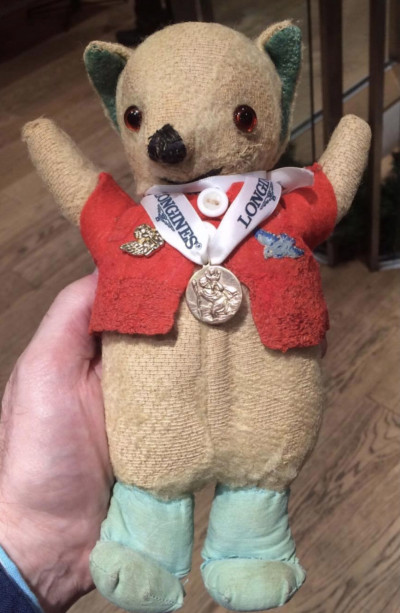
Mr. Whoppit in 2024 wearing the medallion gifted to Donald Campbell by his father.

On joining the Bluebird team, Woppit acquired a miniature of their "Bluebird" patch sewn to his jacket, later followed by a one-piece flight suit. His name also changed slightly to 'Mr Whoppit'. In 1959, both Campbell and Mr Whoppit were photographed together in Robin.

In the late 1990s, Merrythought re-issued a limited production of 5,000 replicas of Mr Whoppit, with the original red jacket now sporting the Bluebird motif.

== With Gina Campbell ==
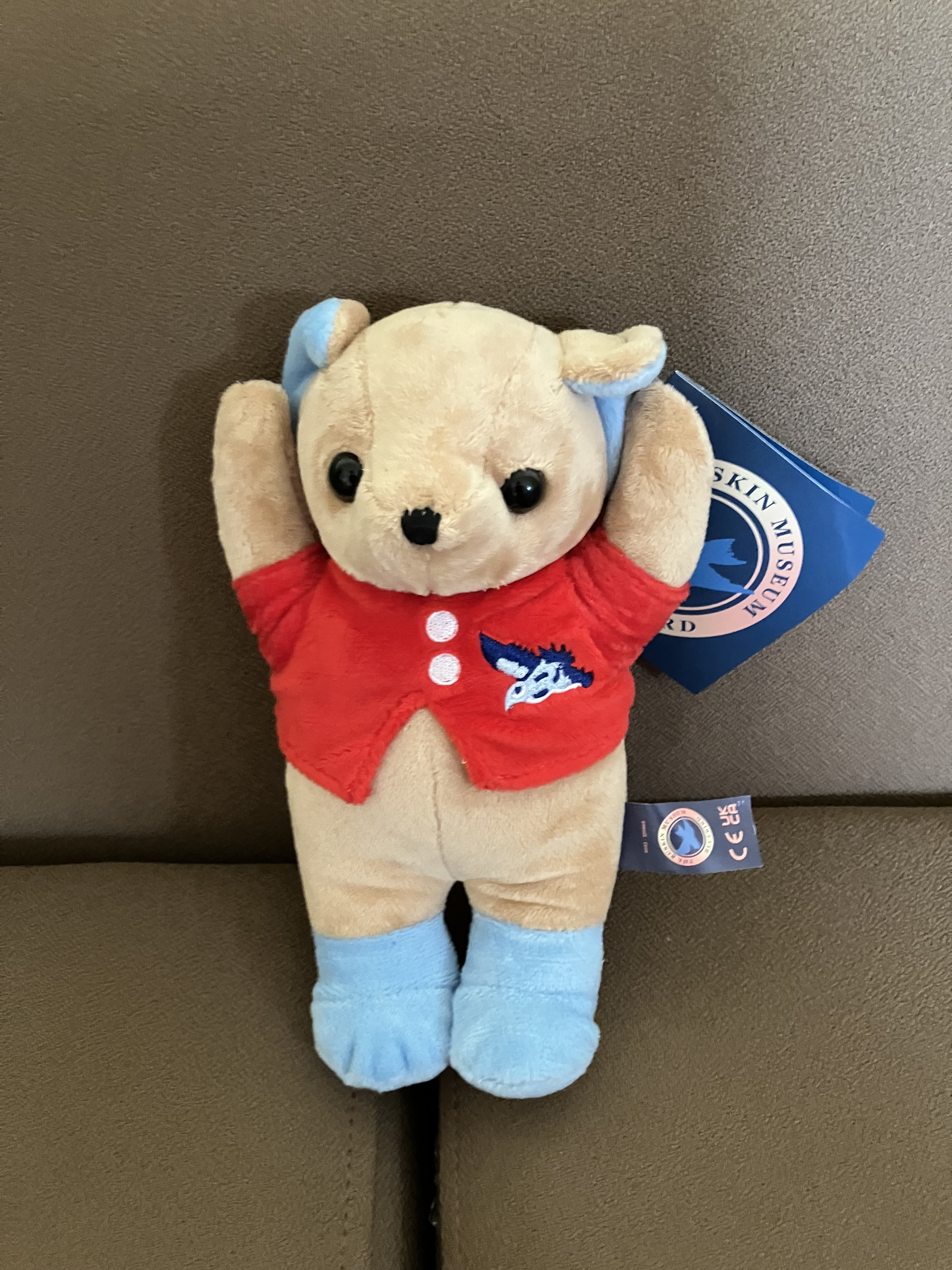
Mr Whoppit sold at the Ruskin Museum in 2024.

In later years, Donald's daughter Gina Campbell also adopted Whoppit as a mascot for her own water record-breaking attempts. These led to Whoppit's third high-speed crash. In 1995 she offered him for auction, together with other Campbell memorabilia. He was to sell for about £60,000 but failed to reach the reserve price of $76,720 to $92,060, and remains in her possession today. The decision to auction off Mr Whoppit was a cause of acrimony between Gina Campbell and Donald's widow Tonia Bern-Campbell, which re-surfaced again during the recovery of Bluebird in 2001. Gina describes Mr. Whoppit as “a very special little bear” and today keeps him safe under lock and key, only being taken out on special occasions and never leaving her side. On 15 May 2026 he was carried in the cockpit of Bluebird K7 by pilot Dave Warby as he took K7 up onto its planes for the first time on Coniston Water since the fatal crash in January 1967. Mr. Whoppit also now wears a medallion gifted to Donald Campbell by Malcolm Campbell. Reproduction collectibles of Mr. Whoppit went on sale in January 2024 at the Ruskin museum.
