= Tate Mantripp =

British powerboat racer (born 2014)

Personal information
- Nationality: British
- Born: 10 April 2014 (age 11) Carlton Colville, Lowestoft, Suffolk, England

Sport
- Sport: Powerboat racing
- Club: Lowestoft and Oulton Broad Motor Boat Club

Tate Mantripp (born 10 April 2014) is a British powerboat racer who competes in the GT15 class. He is notable for being the youngest competitor to set a speed record at Coniston Records Week and for winning the 2025 GT15 UK Masters Championship.

== Early life and family ==
Mantripp is from Carlton Colville, Lowestoft, Suffolk, and attended Carlton Colville Primary School. He comes from a family with extensive involvement in powerboat racing through the Lowestoft and Oulton Broad Motor Boat Club, which was founded in 1933. His father Simon and cousin Jason previously raced as an OSY team. His cousin Peter is the club commodore, while Peter's son Thomas continues to compete. His mother, Nikki, works as a senior accountant.

== Racing career ==
=== 2023: Debut season ===
Mantripp began racing in 2023 at age nine in the GT15 class, a monohull powerboat class open to competitors aged 9 to 16. He achieved a second-place finish in only his third competitive race.

In November 2023, Mantripp competed at Coniston Records Week on Coniston Water in the Lake District. The event is held annually to honour the memory of Donald Campbell, who broke eight world speed records on water and land during the 1950s and 1960s. Mantripp set a GT15 class speed record of 39.16 mph (63.00 km/h), breaking his own earlier record of 38.13 mph (61.37 km/h) from the same week. He became the youngest competitor in the 51-year history of Records Week to set and break a speed record. For this achievement, he received the K7 Silver Star, named after Campbell's iconic Bluebird K7 boat, and was awarded The English Lakes Hotel Trophy as the week's youngest record breaker.

=== 2025: UK Masters Champion ===
On 7–8 June 2025, Mantripp won the GT15 UK Masters Championship at Stewartby Lake, Bedfordshire. He won four consecutive heats in windy and challenging conditions to claim his first major title at age 11. The victory was particularly notable as Mantripp had overcome a difficult start to the season, including a fourth-place finish at Oulton Broad in May after a collision damaged his Povvat hull.

Mantripp continued to compete in the British Powerboat Championships throughout 2025.
