= Ruskin Museum =

Museum in Cumbria, England

Coordinates: 54.3702°N 3.0761°W

The Ruskin Museum
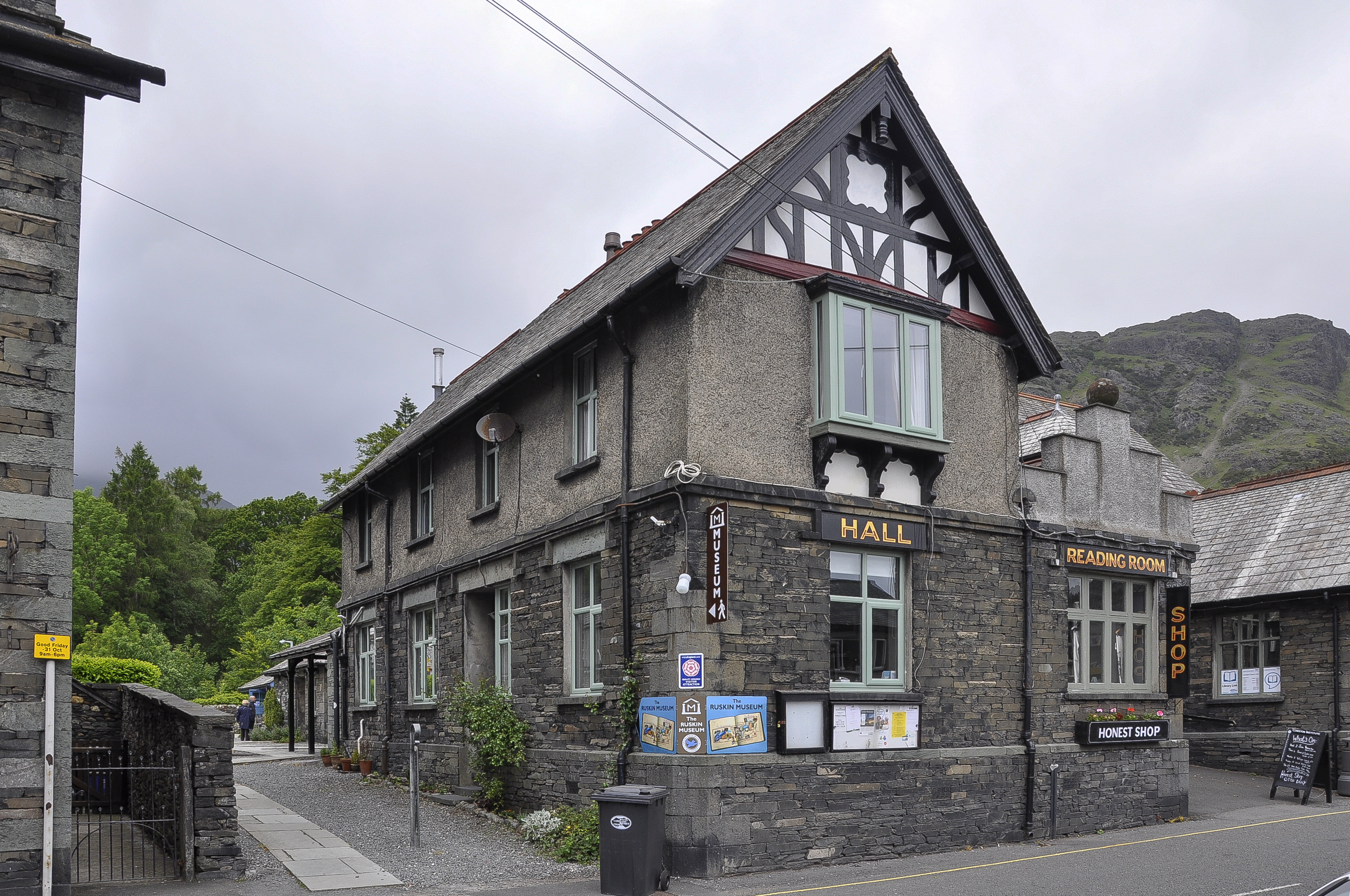
- Established: 31 August 1901
- Website: www.ruskinmuseum.com

The Ruskin Museum is a small local museum in Coniston, Cumbria, northern England.

It was established in 1901 by W. G. Collingwood, an artist and antiquarian who had worked as secretary to art critic John Ruskin. The museum is both a memorial to Ruskin and a local museum covering the history and heritage of Coniston Water and the Lake District.

The museum is a registered charity in England & Wales, constituted as The Coniston Institute and Ruskin Museum.

== Collections and exhibits ==
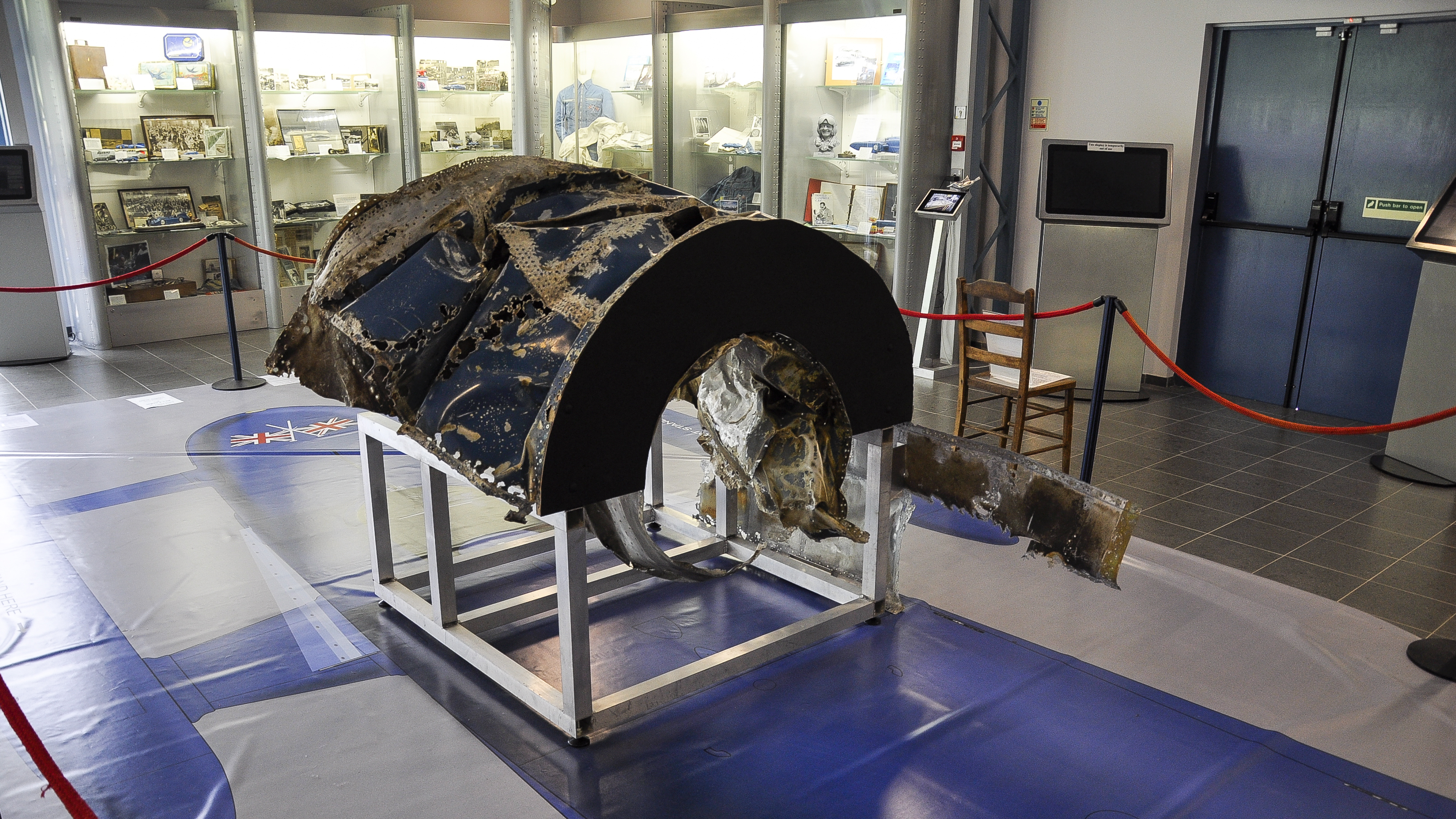
Fragment of Bluebird K7 at the Ruskin Museum

Its collections include material on the copper and slate mines of the region, geology, lace making, farming, and writer Arthur Ransome.

A larger collection is devoted to the life and work of John Ruskin.

In the grounds of the museum stands "Riverdale", an extensive collection of over sixty miniature structures including houses, bridges and farm buildings which were hand-made by local builder John Usher (1940-1993). Based on local vernacular architecture, the slate and stone structures were removed from Usher's former home Brow Head after his death, with the largest collection being re-homed at the museum in 1999.

=== Bluebird ===
A specialist collection covers the achievements of Donald Campbell, who died while attempting a new water speed record on Coniston Water in his hydroplane, Bluebird K7. The restored Bluebird is now part of the collection. A new wing was built to house Bluebird and an associated exhibition, which was completed in 2010. On 7 December 2006, Gina Campbell, Donald's daughter, formally donated Bluebird as recovered from Coniston Water in or around 2001, the associated parts of the vessel both recovered and unrecovered, and all other associated items and objects, recovered and unrecovered, including clothing and overalls of Donald Campbell to the Museum, on behalf of the Campbell Family Heritage Trust. In agreement with the Trust and the museum, Bill Smith offered to organise the restoration of the boat free of charge. Gina Campbell commented: "I've decided to secure the future of Bluebird for the people of Coniston, the Ruskin Museum and the people of the world". Museum Director Vicky Slowe said: "Bill Smith has assured us he can get Bluebird fully conserved and reconfigured at no cost to the museum."

On 3 September 2021, it was announced that relations between the Ruskin Museum and Bill Smith had broken down to the point where the remaining option was for the restored boat to be broken down, with new components removed from original, restored material, in order to resolve the parties' dispute. However, as of February 2023 this had not been carried out, even though the BBC had earlier filmed the Bluebird project team commencing disassembly.

On 24 February 2023, The Ruskin Museum served legal papers on Bill Smith and Bluebird Project Ltd to ensure that the rebuilt Bluebird was handed to its owners.

There was, in 2023, uncertainty about the future of the boat due to competing claims of ownership between the Ruskin Museum and Bluebird Project Ltd. The original recovered material is the property of the museum while Bluebird Project Ltd falsely claimed it owned the newly fabricated parts of the boat, a matter that was eventually settled via a court order after The Ruskin Museum served legal papers on Bill Smith and The Bluebird Project Ltd on 24 February 2023. The museum strongly disputed The Bluebird Project Ltd's ownership claims, as they agreed to restore K7 "at no cost to the museum", funded by "public donations and raising money through sales of merchandise." K7 was to be put on permanent display for public and educational benefit as per the Deed of Gift agreed in 2006.

On 9 March 2024, Bluebird arrived back in Coniston after collection by the Ruskin museum from Bill Smiths' North Shields industrial unit/ workshop, where, excluding its visit to Bute in 2018, it had been held during the craft's restoration since 8 March 2001 - a period of 23 years plus a day. A court order, which settled matters of ownership of K7, ownership of associated parts & equipment, and an agreed proportion of the costs (£25,000) to be paid to the museum, ensured that K7 would, from the date of the order on, be housed in the purpose-built Bluebird wing of the Ruskin museum. Bill Smith and The Bluebird Project agreed to cover their own legal costs in full. The museum announced plans to run K7 on Coniston Water in 2026. As of April 2024, just one month since her return to Coniston, there have been over 6,000 visits to see K7 at the Ruskin Museum, and that to date, is more public views than at any time since the 1960’s.

== Developments ==
In the 1980s, the museum was identified as one of the collections in the North West of England most at risk and a project was launched to secure its long-term future. An £850,000 development scheme (funded by the Heritage Lottery Fund, European Regional Development Fund, Foundation for Sport and the Arts, the Rural Development Commission and others) was started. The interpretive design for the Ruskin Museum received an Association for Heritage Interpretation Interpret Britain Award in 1999. The restored museum with its new extension re-opened to the public in May 1999 and was officially opened by the then Culture Secretary, the Rt. Honourable Chris Smith on 23 May 2000.

In 2017/18, architect Takeshi Hayatsu worked with tutors and students from Central Saint Martins in London and Grizedale Arts to design and install a kiosk adjacent to the museum, with surface copper tiles decorated by local people. The kiosk provides information on the area's copper mining history. The museum grounds also include a community bread oven by Hayatsu and students, a project that was shortlisted for the Architects' Journal Small Projects Awards 2018.

== See also ==
- Armitt Library
- Brantwood
- Ruskin Library
