= Peel Island, Cumbria =

Island in Lake District, England

Coordinates: 54.3177°N 3.0851°W

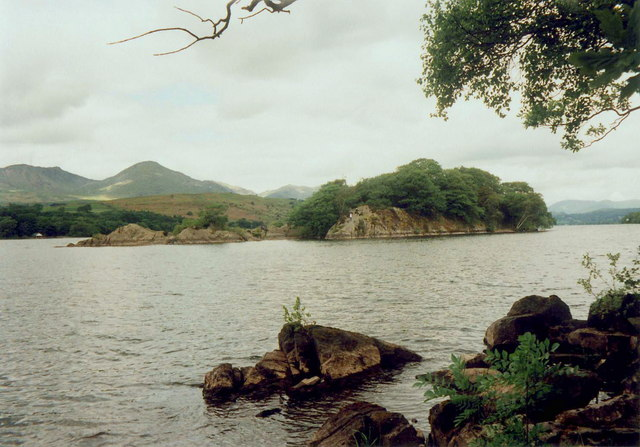
Peel Island

Peel Island (formerly known as Montague Island or the Gridiron) is one of the three islands of Coniston Water in the English Lake District, Cumbria. The two others are Fir Island (which is connected to the shore unless the water is particularly high) and Oak Island. It is most famous for being one of the inspirations for Arthur Ransome's Wild Cat Island. Today, it is a popular tourist destination, and belongs to the National Trust.

== History ==
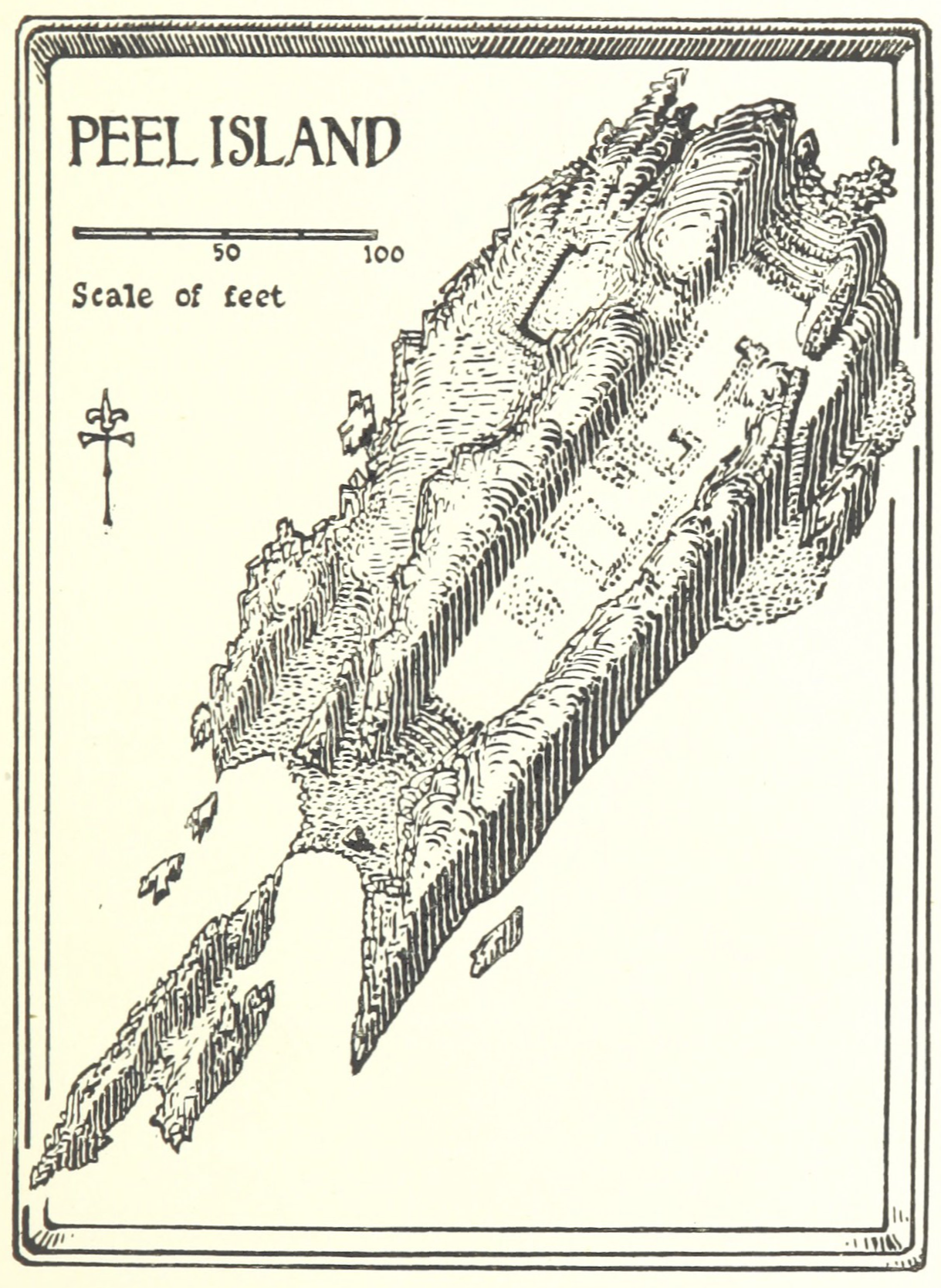
Collingwood's archaeological excavation, 1896, showing remains of walls and fortifications

The name Peel means a fortified site. In 1896 the antiquarian W. G. Collingwood conducted excavations on the island and discovered: the remains of fortifications and other stone buildings, chambers cut into rock, metal-working slag, a fragment of a domestic mortar, and pottery. These he dated to the mediaeval period. There is no record that this was ever a conventional castle, and the antiquarian Henry Swainson Cowper conjectures that it was a short-lived stronghold of a petty outlaw. The local name Gridiron derives from the parallel rock ridges running the length of the island. The name Montague Island derives from Elizabeth Montague (1743–1827), a descendent of George Monck, 1st Duke of Albemarle, who was gifted the local manor by King Charles II.

Peel Island has belonged to the National Trust since it was given to them by John Montagu-Douglas-Scott, 7th Duke of Buccleuch, along with 11 acres (4.5 ha) of woodland, in 1932.

== Wild Cat Island ==
Peel Island is considered to be one of the origins of the fictional Wild Cat Island in the 1930 book Swallows and Amazons and its sequels, by Arthur Ransome. Taqui Altounyan, sister of Roger Altounyan and inspiration for one of the characters in Swallows and Amazons, described Peel Island in her autobiography In Aleppo Once as "like a green tuffet, sitting in the water, the trees covering the rocks". The island also features in W. G. Collingwood's novel Thorstein of the Mere, A Saga of the Northmen in Lakeland. Ransome, at the age of eight, first met the Collingwoods at a family picnic on Peel Island: a chance meeting that would prove to have important consequences in Ransome's later life, with Collingwood's grandchildren providing a model for significant characters in Swallows and Amazons.

== Accident ==
In 1967, Donald Campbell died near Peel Island while trying to set a world water speed record with a speed in excess of 300 miles per hour (480 km/h).
