= Canbury School =

School in Kingston upon Thames, London

Location
- Kingston Hill; Kingston upon Thames, Surrey, KT2 7LN; England; 51.42391°N 0.2758°W

Information
- Type: Other Independent School
- Motto: An individual approach to success
- Established: 1982
- Founder: John Wyatt
- Local authority: Kingston upon Thames
- Department for Education URN: 102620 Tables
- Gender: Coeducational
- Age: 11 to 18
- Houses: Campbell, Johnson and Noble
- Colours: Blue, Red and Yellow
- Website: www.canburyschool.co.uk

Canbury School is a small specialist independent day school in Kingston upon Thames, Greater London with a maximum of 80 pupils on roll.

== History ==
Canbury School was founded by John Wyatt in 1982. He had previously taught in several large schools with high academic standards and had come to believe that such standards could be applied to children with a broader range of ability. A smaller school would allow children to be more involved in their progress and in the community and to be more motivated and happier.

In 1997, Wyatt retired and the school became an educational charity administered by a Board of Governors, thus assuming its long-term stability. Cedric Harben was appointed Headmaster. Further developments took place and, following a rigorous inspection, the school gained full accreditation from the Independent Schools Council and joined the Independent Schools Association.

The school building was once a domestic residence owned by Malcolm Campbell. His son Donald was born there in 1921.

== Facilities ==
The school is on Kingston Hill at the corner of Warboys Approach. It has a science laboratory and prep room, an art studio equipped with a pottery area and kiln, and access to local facilities for a wide range of sporting activities including athletics, cricket, netball, softball, and watersports.
