= Bluebird K7 =

World record-setting British hydroplane

General information
- Type: Water speed record
- Manufacturer: Samlesbury Engineering (hull); Metropolitan-Vickers (Beryl engine 1955-1966); Bristol Siddeley (Orpheus engine 1966-1967)
- Designer: Norris Brothers
- Primary user: Donald Campbell
- Number built: 1

History
- Introduction date: January 1955
- Retired: January 1967

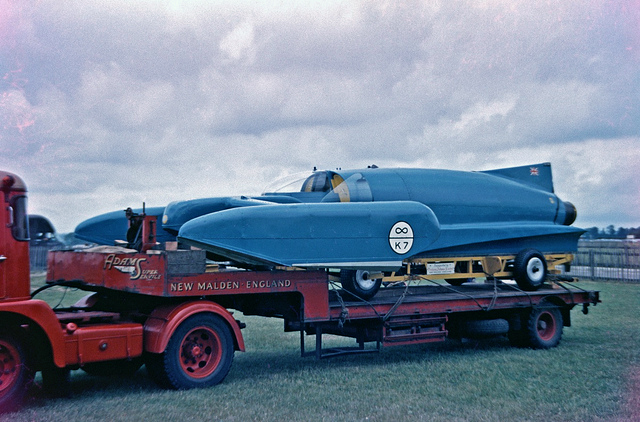
Bluebird K7, in its most successful guise, on display at the Goodwood Motor Racing circuit in July 1960.

Bluebird K7 is a jet engined hydroplane in which Britain's Donald Campbell set seven world water speed records between 1955 and 1967. K7 was the first successful jet-powered hydroplane, and was considered revolutionary when launched in January 1955. Campbell and K7 were responsible for adding almost 100 miles per hour (160 km/h) to the water speed record, taking it from existing mark of 178 miles per hour (286 km/h) to just over 276 miles per hour (444 km/h). Donald Campbell was killed in an accident with a much modified K7, on 4 January 1967, whilst making a bid for his eighth water speed record, with his aim to raise the record to over 300 miles per hour (480 km/h) on Coniston Water.

In 1996, a diving team using sonar equipment started an underwater survey, locating anew the K7 wreckage. Subsequently, it was recovered between 2000 and 2007, while Campbell's body was recovered in 2001.

== Design and engineering ==
Donald Campbell began his record-breaking career in 1949 following the death of his father, Sir Malcolm Campbell. Initially, he had been using his father's 1939-built Rolls-Royce 'R' type powered propeller-driven hydroplane Blue Bird K4 for his attempts, but he met with little success and suffered a number of frustrating setbacks. In 1951, K4, which had been modified to a prop-rider configuration to increase its performance potential, was destroyed after suffering a structural failure, when its V-drive gearbox sheared its mountings which were punched through the floor of the hull.

Following rival record breaker John Cobb's death in his jet boat Crusader, which broke up at over 200 miles per hour (320 km/h) during a record attempt in September 1952, Campbell began development of his own advanced all-metal jet-powered Bluebird K7 hydroplane to challenge the record, by then held by the American prop rider hydroplane Slo-Mo-Shun IV.

Designed by Norris Brothers, Ken and Lew, the K7 was a steel-framed, aluminium-bodied, three-point hydroplane, built at Samlesbury by Samlesbury Engineering, powered by a Metropolitan-Vickers Beryl axial-flow turbojet engine using electric start with external battery pack, producing 3500 pound-force (16 kN) of thrust. Like Slo-Mo-Shun, but unlike Cobb's tricycle Crusader, the three planing points were arranged with two forward and one aft, in a "pickle-fork" layout, prompting Bluebird's early comparison to a blue lobster.

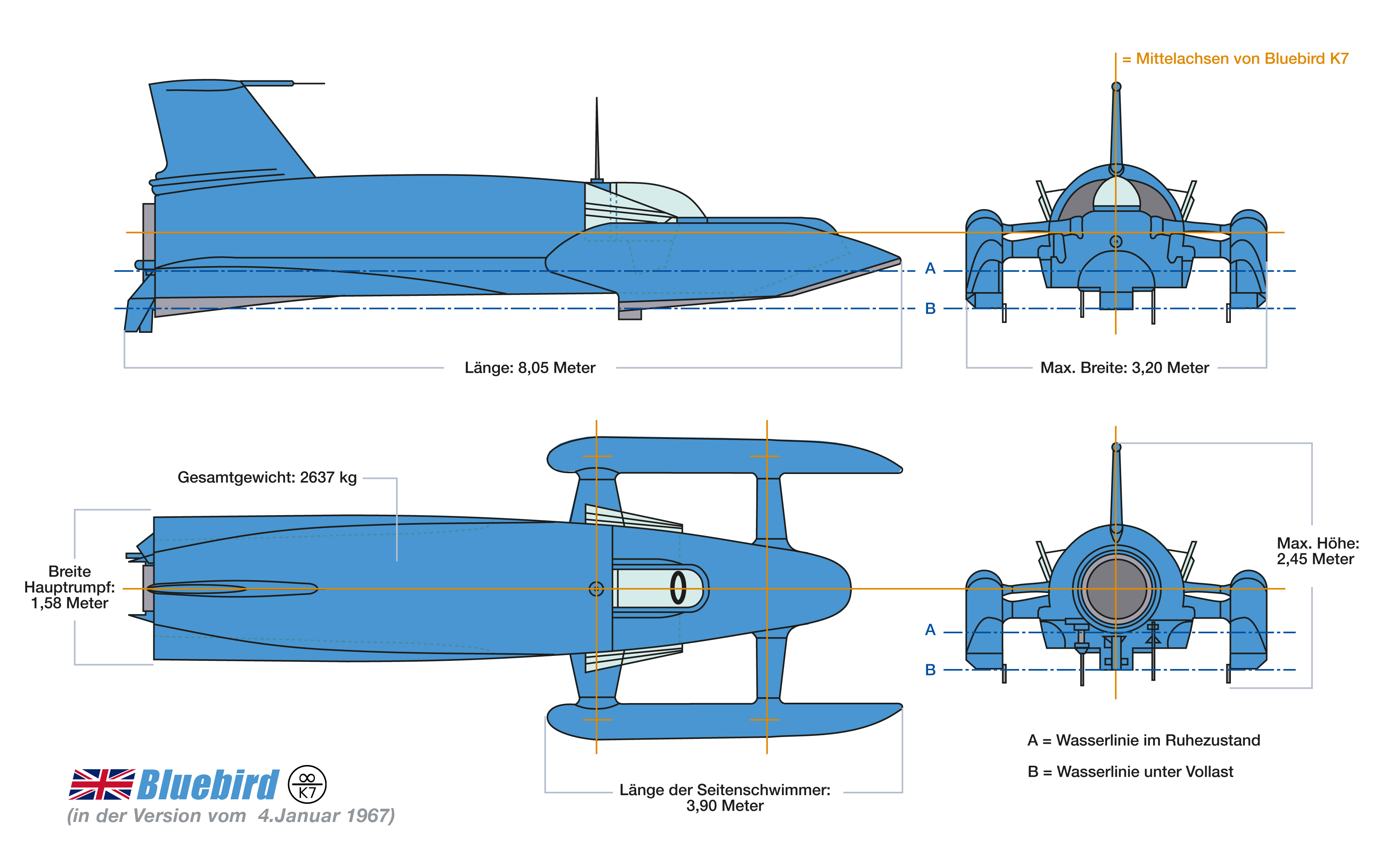
General Arrangement of Bluebird K7

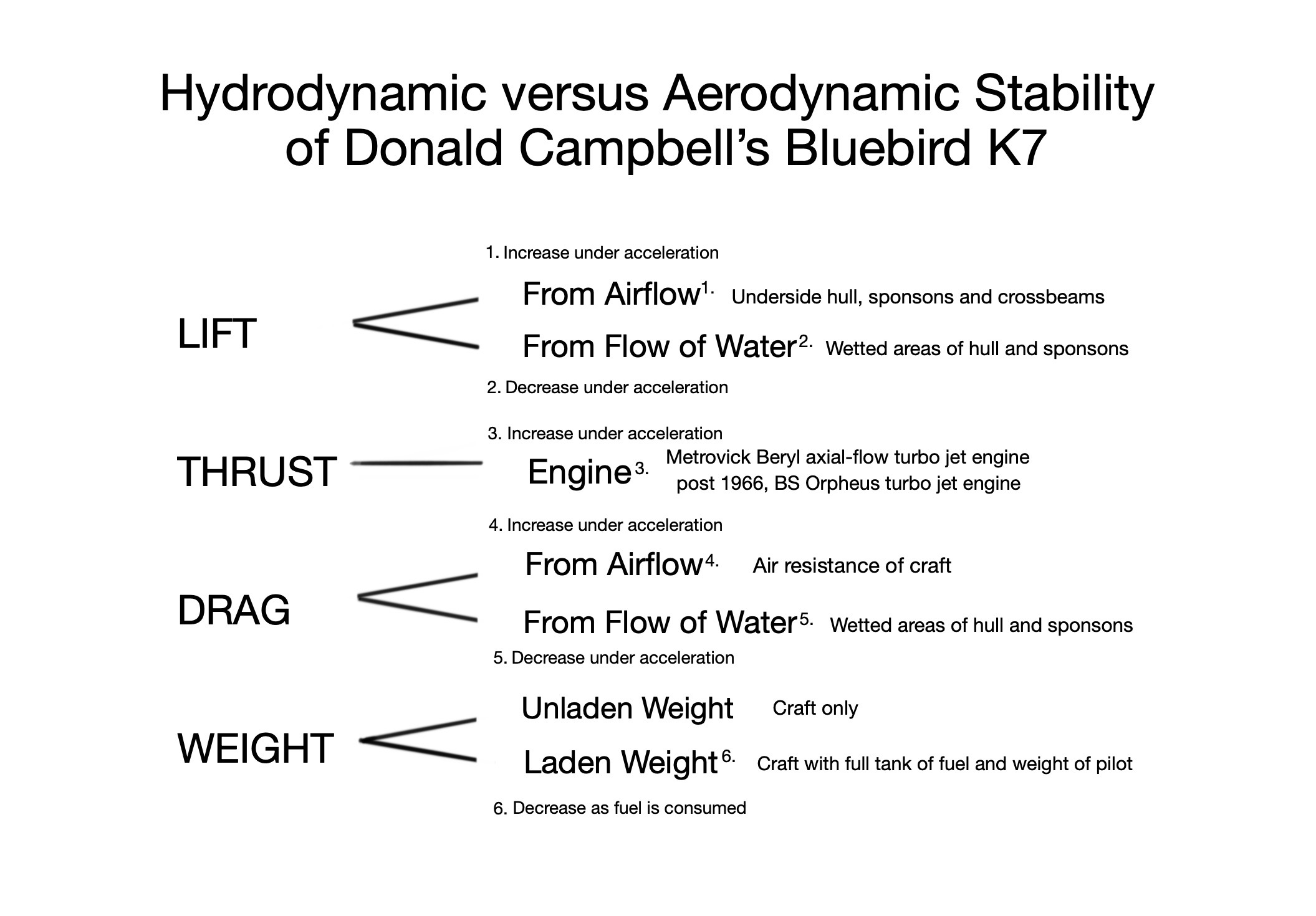
Design parameters of Bluebird K7 Hydroplane

K7 was of very advanced design and construction, and its load-bearing steel space frame ultra rigid. It had a design speed of 250 miles per hour (400 km/h) and remained the only successful jet-boat in the world until the late 1960s.

From the brief of the mid 1950s, Bluebird K7 was designed to:

- To attain a speed of 250 mph commensurate with an adequate margin of static and dynamic stability in yaw, pitch and roll.
- Very high structural strength and stiffness; the 'g' loadings were to be '. . . some three times that of "Crusader" and five times that of the old Bluebird.
- Low frontal profile area to minimise aerodynamic drag.
- Every attempt to minimise aerodynamic lifting moments forward of the Centre of Gravity (CG).
- Paired forward sponsons mounted on outriggers to reduce loadings at the front planes.
- Planes to have high lift and low drag with good anti-porpoising capability, sponson under-surfaces to permit good transition from the displacement to the planing condition, and good anti-dive characteristics.
- Low CG to minimise potential pitching oscillations at the natural frequency of the craft.
- Turbojet propulsion with low thrust line to minimise thrust on/off moment effects.
- Fuel tank at or near the CG to minimise effects on trim due to fuel state.

The designation "K7" was derived from its RYA unlimited rating registration. It was carried on a prominent white roundel on its sponsons, underneath an infinity symbol. Bluebird K7 was the seventh boat registered with the RYA in the 'Unlimited' hydroplane series.

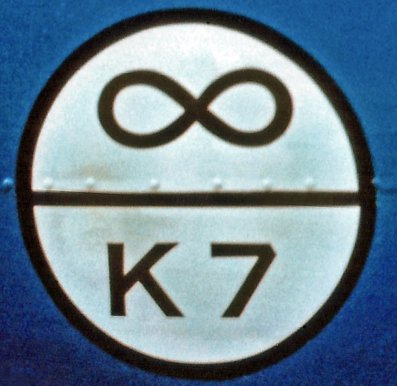
K7's RYA Unlimited Hydroplane registration

== Bluebird K7 records ==
Campbell set seven world water speed records in K7 between July 1955 and December 1964. The first of these marks was set at Ullswater on 23 July 1955, where he achieved a speed of 202.15 mph (324 km/h) but only after many months of trials, changes to the inlet splash guards, and a major redesign of Bluebird's forward sponson attachments points by the raising of her front spar. Campbell achieved a steady series of subsequent speed-record increases with the boat during the rest of the decade, beginning with a mark of 216 mph (348 km/h) in 1955 on Lake Mead in Nevada. Subsequently, four new marks were registered on Coniston Water, where Campbell and Bluebird became an annual fixture in the later half of the fifties, enjoying significant sponsorship from the Mobil oil company and then BP. Campbell made an unsuccessful attempt in 1957 at Canandaigua in New York state in the summer of 1957, which failed due to lack of suitable calm water conditions. It was reported in the New York Times of 17 August 1957 that "Bluebird Leaves Water for 200 Feet When It Strikes Swell at 240 M.P.H." Bluebird K7 became a well known attraction, and as well as her annual Coniston appearances, K7 was displayed extensively in the UK, USA, Canada and Europe, and then subsequently in Australia during Campbell's prolonged attempt on the land speed record in 1963–64.

In order to extract more speed, and endow the boat with greater high speed stability, in both pitch and yaw, K7 was subtly modified in the second half of the 1950s to incorporate more effective streamlining with a blown Perspex cockpit canopy and fluting to the lower part of the main hull. In 1958 a small wedge shaped tail fin housing an arrester parachute, modified sponson fairings that gave a significant reduction in forward aerodynamic lift, and a fixed hydrodynamic stabilising fin attached to the transom to aid directional stability and exert a marginal down-force on the nose were incorporated into the design to increase the safe operating envelope of the hydroplane. Thus she reached 225 mph (362 km/h) in 1956, where an unprecedented peak speed of 286.78 mph (461.53 km/h) was achieved on the first run, 239 mph (385 km/h) in 1957, 248 mph (399 km/h) in 1958 and 260 mph (420 km/h) in 1959.

In 1958, Donald Campbell with his team took Bluebird K7 to the Brussels World's Fair. K7 became a centrepiece to the British stand. The publicity event continued to Lake Bourget close to Aix-les-Bains, where in June 1958 K7 was shown at the annual festival.

Campbell then turned his attention to the land speed record, with the aim of establishing a land speed record of 450 mph (720 km/h) plus. He also planned to set a seventh water speed record in the same year, and so become the first person to establish the land speed record and water speed record in the same year. He set out for the Bonneville Salt Flats in August 1960 and was lucky to survive a 360 mph (580 km/h) crash in his Norris Brothers designed Bluebird CN7 turbine powered car later that September. Bluebird CN7 was rebuilt in 1961–62 and Campbell subsequently spent a frustrating two years in the Australian desert, battling adverse track conditions. Finally, after Campbell exceeded the land speed record on Lake Eyre on 17 July 1964, at 403.10 mph (648.73 km/h) in Bluebird CN7, he snared his seventh water speed record on 31 December 1964 at Dumbleyung Lake, Western Australia, when he reached 276.33 mph (444.71 km/h), with two runs at 283.3 mph (455.9 km/h) and 269.3 mph (433.4 km/h) completed with only hours to spare on New Year's Eve 1964.

This latest success made Campbell and K7 the world's most prolific holders of the water speed record, and in addition Campbell realised his 'double' when he became the first, and so far only, person to break both the land speed record and the water speed record in the same year. Following on from this success, Campbell stated that K7 would be most likely retired and become a museum exhibit. Her hull was ten years old, her engine fourteen, and her design speed of 250 mph (400 km/h) had been exceeded by over 30 mph (48 km/h) on a number of occasions.

=== Donald Campbell's water speed records ===
Speed	Craft	Location	Date
202.32 mph (325.60 km/h)	Bluebird K7	Ullswater	23 July 1955
216.20 mph (347.94 km/h)	Bluebird K7	Lake Mead	16 November 1955
225.63 mph (363.12 km/h)	Bluebird K7	Coniston Water	19 September 1956
239.07 mph (384.75 km/h)	Bluebird K7	Coniston Water	7 November 1957
248.62 mph (400.12 km/h)	Bluebird K7	Coniston Water	10 November 1958
260.35 mph (418.99 km/h)	Bluebird K7	Coniston Water	14 May 1959
276.33 mph (444.71 km/h)	Bluebird K7	Lake Dumbleyung	31 December 1964

Donald Campbell had two Metrovick Beryl engines that were interchangeable during K7's life. These were used in achieving all of his seven K7 records. The Beryl engines were used from 1955 until 1966.

== Final record attempt and death of Donald Campbell ==
In June 1966, Campbell decided to once more try for a water speed record with K7: his target, 300 mph (480 km/h).

To add more power, Campbell received a 4,500 pound-force (20 kN) Bristol Siddeley Orpheus engine on loan from the Ministry of Defence. This was both lighter and more powerful than the original engine. Campbell also purchased a crash-damaged Folland Gnat, which used the Orpheus engine, as a source of spare parts. The vertical stabiliser from the Gnat was also used on the rebuilt K7, and a new hydraulic water brake designed to slow the boat down on the five-mile Coniston course. Also changed in the 1966 redesign, was the start system: "The compressed air starting system, designed and manufactured by Rotax Ltd for the Orpheus engine in the Hunting H.126 and Folland Gnat aircraft, was adapted for use in Bluebird. The system comprised two spherical air bottles containing 39lbs of dehumidified air, compressed to over 3,000psi. The bottles... were charged by means of a high-pressure, three-stage compressor, complete with air-drying and cleaning facility, housed in a specially adapted Land Rover vehicle."

The boat returned to Coniston for trials in November 1966. These did not go well; the weather was appalling and K7 destroyed her engine when the air intakes collapsed under the demands of the more powerful engine, and debris was drawn into the compressor blades. The engine was replaced, using the engine from the Gnat aircraft that he had purchased at the project's start. The original Orpheus remained outside the team's lakeside workshop for the rest of the project, shrouded in a tarpaulin.

By the end of November, after further modifications to alter K7's weight distribution, some high-speed runs were made, but these were timed at well below the existing record. Problems with the fuel system meant that the engine could not develop maximum power. By the middle of December, Campbell had made a number of timed attempts, but the highest speed achieved was 264 mph, and therefore still shy of the existing record. Eventually, further modifications to K7's fuel system (involving the fitting of a booster pump) fixed the fuel-starvation problem. It was now the end of December and Campbell was all set to proceed, pending only the arrival of suitable weather conditions.

=== Final runs ===
On 4 January 1967, Campbell mounted his record attempt. Bluebird had completed an initial north–south run at an average of 297.6 mph (478.9 km/h), and Campbell used the new water brake to slow K7 from a peak speed of 311 mph (501 km/h) when he left the measured kilometre. Instead of coming to a stop and opting to refuel, he decided to perform a quick turnaround and immediately head back up the course before the wash of his first run had time to be reflected back towards the centre of the lake. Both options had been discussed in the pre attempt briefing.

The second run was even faster; as K7 passed the start of the measured kilometre, she was travelling at over 320 mph (510 km/h). However her stability had begun to break down as she travelled at a speed she had never achieved before, and the front of the boat started to bounce out of the water on the starboard side. 150 yards (135 metres) from the end of the measured kilometre, K7 lifted from the surface and after about 1.5 seconds, gradually lifted from the water at an ever-increasing angle, then took off at a 90-degree angle to the water surface. She somersaulted and plunged back into the lake, nose first, then cartwheeled across the water before coming to rest. The impact broke K7 forward of the air intakes (where Campbell was sitting) and the main hull sank shortly afterwards.

Campbell had been killed instantly. Mr Whoppit, his teddy bear mascot, was found among the floating debris and his helmet was recovered. Royal Navy divers were able to locate the wreck of K7, but called off the search for Campbell's body after two weeks.

Campbell's last words, recorded from the radio intercom, were:

Pitching a bit down here ... Probably from my own wash ... Straightening up now on track ... Rather closer to Peel Island ... Tramping like mad ... and er ... Full power ... Tramping like hell here ... I can't see much ... and the water's very bad indeed ... I can't get over the top/I'm galloping over the top ... I'm getting a lot of bloody row in here ... I can't see anything ... I've got the bows out ... I'm going! ....ugh"

=== Accident analysis ===
There are varying theories about the cause of the crash. Not waiting to refuel meant the boat was lighter. The wash from the first run would have been made worse by use of the water brake; however, the wash had not had time to reflect back to the centre of the course, and Campbell had used the water brake well to the south. The still photographs taken of the latter part of the final run clearly show that the water brake was not deployed then, and also that when K7 became airborne, the jet engine was no longer functioning; the exhaust would have very noticeably disturbed the water. The engine had therefore flamed out. It is impossible to be certain why; fuel starvation, damage to a structural element during the bouncing, disturbance of the airstream into the intakes during pitching, or a combination of causes are all possible. The most likely ultimate cause is that Bluebird exceeded its aerodynamic static stability limit, with loss of engine thrust, damage to the port spar fairing, and the then little understood ground-effect lift enhancement all adding to the instability.

As a result of meticulous frame by frame study of high quality colour footage filmed on that day, and by examining all available photographs, Keith Mitchell & Neil Sheppard reported that they had identified aerodynamic instability partially due to earlier damage to the port-side forward spar, which gave rise to the starboard sponson lifting off the surface of the water for some 0.8 seconds: "The front spar that had been dented in collision with the duck the previous day was examined by Norris, but as it was only the fairing and not the load-bearing structure beneath, it was decided to leave it alone." This instability was evident in the north–south outward run, but only in the light of retrospective viewing of the film obtained from a camera position at the southern end of the lake, and therefore looking up the lake to the measured km. The team out on the lake were not in a position to have witnessed what the filming later revealed. The occurrence towards the end of measured km gave cause for concern and Campbell was almost certainly aware of the lift: "Just as he (DMC) left the measured kilometre, the engine flamed-out for some inexplicable reason. DC referred to relighting the engine in his commentary and then said: "relight made normal"". This was as K7 left the measured km, and the loss of engine thrust and asymmetrical damage were undoubtedly contributory factors to the brief airborne episode.

On the final northward run, instability was exacerbated as Donald Campbell pushed the speed of Bluebird K7 above 300 mph. "The starboard sponson bounced free of the water, twice in quick succession lasting 0.5 and 0.3 seconds respectively. Still accelerating ... her speed peaked (later calculated at 328 mph). Her starboard sponson continued to bounce clear of the water ... for a fifth (and final) time ... Bluebird exceeded her safe pitching angle of 5.5 degrees (above horizontal), and slowly took to the air." Mitchell and Sheppard refer to a report in the Express newspaper dated 18 January 1967, telling the reader that Ken Norris was intimately involved with every aspect of the RAF crash investigation: "Norris stated that at 300 mph the take-off angle was calculated at 6 degrees (to horizontal)... No mention was made of the flame-out of the engine on the first of the two runs, or that the engine could have possibly flamed-out on the return run as it was throttled back. The report concluded that Campbell had sensed he was out of control and had lifted his foot from the accelerator, since there was no thrust disturbance from the jet-pipe. The engine had actually flamed out on the return run as it was either throttled back or starved of air by the pitch-up angle / fuel system malfunction. The accident had been caused by a combination of circumstances which Donald and Bluebird were capable of overcoming in isolation, but not together."

== Recovery ==
The wreckage of Bluebird was discovered on the lake bed on 5 January 1967. A 10-man Royal Navy diving team arrived at Coniston late on the day of the accident. They set off for their first attempt to locate Campbell and Bluebird at 12.30pm the next day. Some calculations had been made to guide the dive team to the boat's likely resting point.

The first three dives found small pieces of wreckage. On the fourth dive, the main hull of K7 was found in 142 feet of water, resting in her correct attitude but facing to the south-east. A subsequent and prolonged search located many pieces of wreckage, and various items were brought to the surface including Bluebird's broken steering wheel and column. However, the body of Campbell was not located, and the search was called off on 16 January. The Campbell family and team let it be known that they did not wish to have the hull of K7 recovered in the absence of finding Campbell's body. They also felt they would learn nothing from its recovery.

Using adapted sonar technology, a diving team led by underwater surveyor Bill Smith, was responsible for locating anew the wreckage. Brian Gilgeous and Smith worked together towards K7's subsequent recovery. The wreckage was recovered between October 2000, when the first small sections were raised, May 2001, when Campbell's body was recovered, and March 2007. The largest section, representing approximately two-thirds of the main hull, was salvaged on 8 March 2001. The recovery was witnessed by a small group of onlookers including Ken Norris and Campbell's widow Tonia. In 1998, Mike Rossiter from BBC TV had approached the Bluebird Project team with a view to filming the wreck. He was also there at the time K7 was brought ashore. Smith returned in 2007 to locate and recover more pieces of K7 from Coniston Water.

Campbell's body was retrieved from the lake on 28 May 2001. He was interred in Coniston cemetery on 12 September that year after a funeral service at St Andrews Church in Coniston. Campbell's sister Jean Wales had been against the recovery of the boat and her brother's body out of respect for his stated wish that, in the event of something going wrong: "Skipper and boat stay together."

== Restoration and rebuilding of Bluebird K7 ==
=== Consent for the works to proceed ===
As the work to recover K7 and the body of Donald Campbell from the lakebed was underway, Paul Foulkes-Halbard, a former business associate of Campbell and owner of Filching Manor Motor Museum in Polegate, had claimed he acquired ownership of the boat in the course of business dealings with DMC. His museum already had an extensive collection of Campbell-related exhibits including Bluebird K3. His claim was rejected by a consent order lodged at the High Court in London on 7 September 2001, which declared Tonia Bern-Campbell and the executors of Campbell's will as the rightful owners. On behalf of the Campbell family, Gina Campbell directed that the wreckage raised in March 2001 should be kept at the premises of Smith in Newcastle-upon-Tyne from the March date pending the court's decision on K7's future ownership. The Argus also reported in September 2001: "It is the family's intention that the boat will be displayed at the Ruskin Museum in Coniston, which will now have to be extended to accommodate it".

In November 2001, a few months after the wreck of K7 had been recovered, Gina Campbell, Donald's daughter, in an interview with the BBC's Kevin Bocquet in Cumbria, spoke of her plans to fully restore the Bluebird craft in memory of her father: "It would be my own tribute to my father, who was the bravest man I ever knew... We had two choices," said Gina. "Either we could lock her away, and she would never have been seen again, or we could completely restore her back to her old beauty... We could never display her in the state she is in... I do not want people to see her like this... I would be worried about how children would react to her... I think they would find it too frightening... I want Bluebird to be restored and to go on display in Coniston, so that people will always remember what a fantastic, brave man my father was."

On 7 December 2006, Gina Campbell by deed of gift, and on behalf of the Campbell Family Heritage Trust, formally transferred ownership of Bluebird K7, the associated parts of the vessel both recovered and unrecovered, and all other associated items and objects recovered and/or unrecovered, including clothing and overalls of Donald Campbell, to the Ruskin Museum in Coniston. Bill Smith volunteered to undertake the restoration work at no cost to the owners (the Ruskin Museum), as, at this time there was no officially confirmed written agreement between GC and BBP that BBP should "continue with the proposed work in the knowledge that the project will not be pulled out from under you. We are all operating under a "trust" of word, and I know each party will honour this."

In background information provided to accompany an interview with Gina Campbell in 2018, Leatherhead & District Local History Society published the following: "In May 2009 permission was given for a one off set of proving trials on Coniston Water where it would be tested to a safe speed for demonstration purposes only. K7 was to be housed in its own purpose-built wing at the Ruskin Museum while remaining in the care of the Bluebird Project."

In January 2020, on the occasion of the fifty-third anniversary of Donald Campbell's death, The Guardian reported Gina Campbell "clashed with vessel's restorer over its return to scene of father's death in Lake District".

== Heritage of Bluebird K7 ==
In 2006, the Campbell Family Heritage Trust donated Bluebird K7 to the Ruskin Museum via a Deed of Gift, on the understanding that the boat would be restored on a voluntary basis and displayed in the museum's purpose-built wing.

Gina Campbell later stated that the family’s wish was for Bluebird K7 to be restored and returned to Coniston so that it could be displayed there for the public.

=== Scope of restoration works ===
Gina Campbell described the rebuilding of Bluebird K7 as "nothing short of a miracle". The restoration continued throughout a number of phases, using the Norris Brothers' original drawings together with access to Neil Sheppard's collection of photographs and illustrations.

- Assessment of the dozen or so pieces recovered from the wreck as to which parts could be repaired and reused, and which others would be remade.
- Evaluating the effects of long-term corrosion on the various metals used in the construction of the craft. The steel frame itself was almost inert. The Nimonic Stainless steel jetpipe was inert. Other metals used in the construction of the craft were lead ballast, copper plumbing pipe for the fire extinguishers, various grades of aluminium skins and a magnesium engine casing.
- Decision to proceed with full restoration for running.
- Reinstatement of the central steel space frame to recreate a rigid core structure free from bend, twist or uneven deflection under load. When the frame was stripped down and subjected to X-ray testing for Weld quality assurance, it was found to be in poor condition, not only as a result of crash damage and corrosion, but also due to the inferior welding quality of the 1955 fabrication. 3D scanning of the space-frame indicated anomalies in the alignment which might have predated the 1967 WSR attempt on Coniston Water. Repair and rebuilding of the frame required plating, riveting and welding using tungsten inert gas (TIG) welding sets. It was blasted then wet painted with Interzinc 71, a zinc-rich primer, then polyester powder coat on top. The inside of every tube was opened with a 10mm hole, all dust and rivet stems removed then misted internally with Ardrox AV8 aerospace inhibitor then the holes closed with a rubber grommet. On reassembly every rivet stem entering the frame was wet riveted using Naftoseal polysulphide sealant supplied by Airbus.
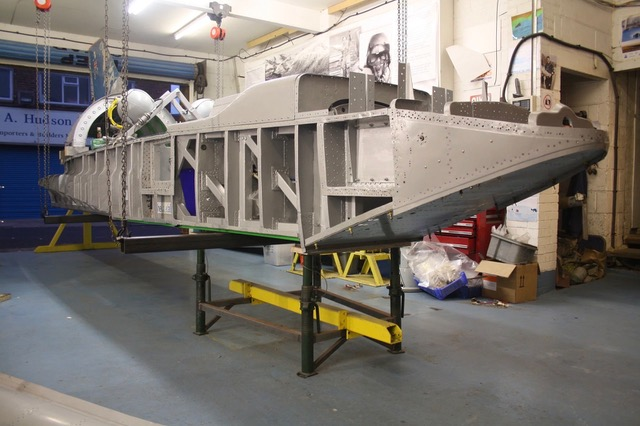
  Bluebird K7's main hull complete and painted internally on an adjustable jig prior to setting up the front end geometry (spars and sponsons). With no outer skins fitting out of the hull was much easier with the skins installed last of all.
- Reinstatement of aluminium body panels, engine cover, hull and sponsons involved time-consuming traditional light engineering skills, including where necessary, machine tools such as guillotine, brake-press, English wheel and power hammer for intricate panel forming repair or for remaking.
- Locate a suitable Bristol Siddeley Orpheus engine, recondition and test it to the same performance level of its counterpart lost when K7 went down in 1967. The replacement engine was donated by De Havilland Aviation in 2007. The Orpheus 101 engine required modification to suit the rebuilt craft.
- Install engine with cockpit controls, fuel delivery systems, inboard fire extinguishing system, fuel tanks pumps and lines, hydraulics including motors valves pumps and lines, rudders and water brake.
- Restoration and installation of K7's air starter including introduction of new seals - by using original drawings and Inspection & test procedure (ITP) sourced from the archives of Rotax Ltd, Willesden, London NW10, the system's manufacturer
- Make ready for crew training and shakedown

By early 2024, K7 had been substantially restored in a workshop at Kiltech Industrial Units on Hudson Street, North Shields, Tyne and Wear, by The Bluebird Project, to a high standard of working condition using a significant proportion of her original fabric, but with a replacement Bristol Siddeley Orpheus engine, loaned to them by Geoff Beck, former CEO of De Havilland Aviation, of a similar type albeit incorporating many original components.

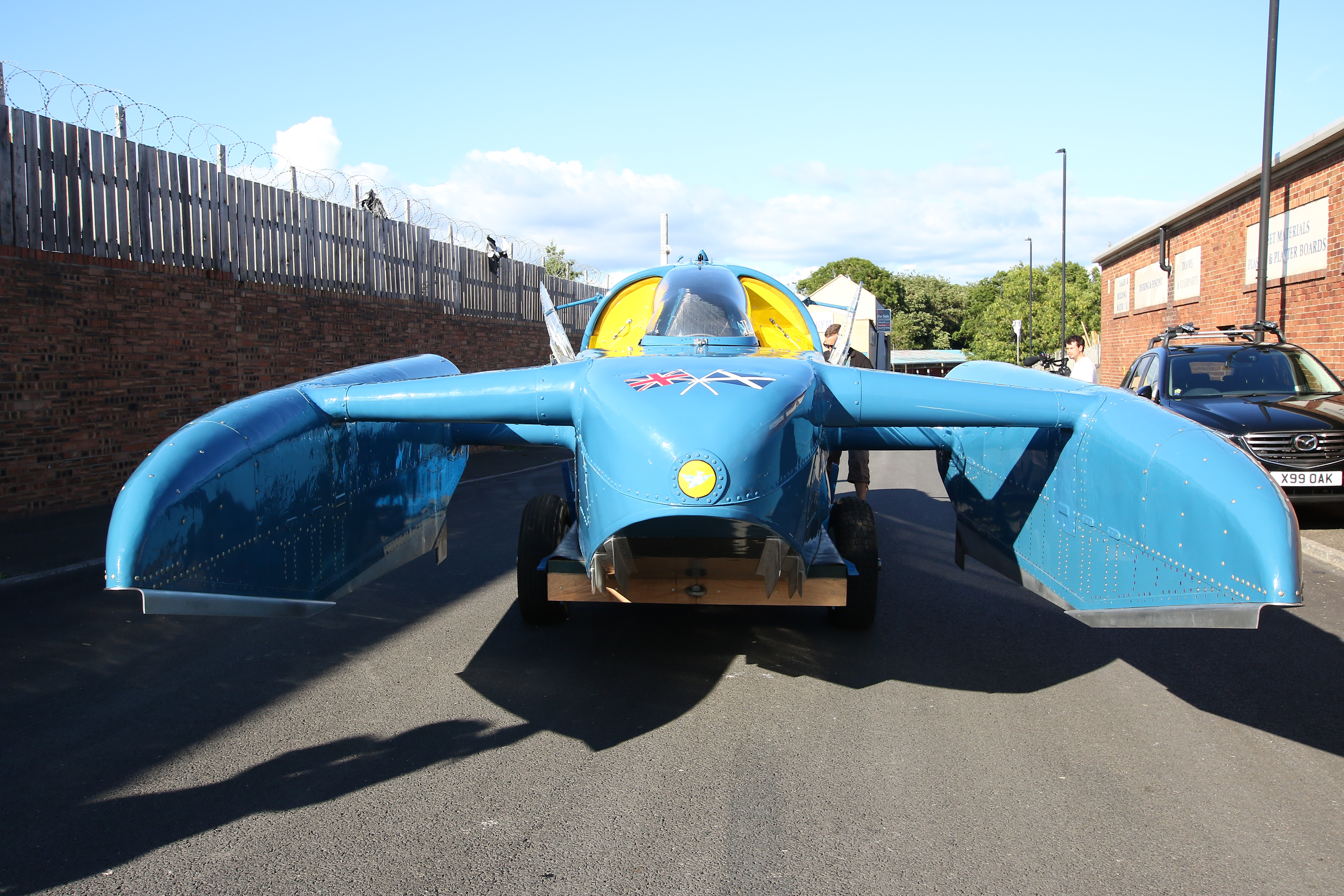
Bluebird K7 outside where she was rebuilt by volunteers. She was transported to the Isle of Bute the next day for a crew training exercise. August 2018

On 9 March 2024, Bluebird K7 arrived back in Coniston after a successful legal ownership campaign, and was collected by the Ruskin Museum from Smith's property in North Tyneside, where, excluding its visit to Bute in 2018, it had been since 8 March 2001.

=== Re-floating ===
On 20 March 2018 the restoration was featured on the BBC's The One Show.

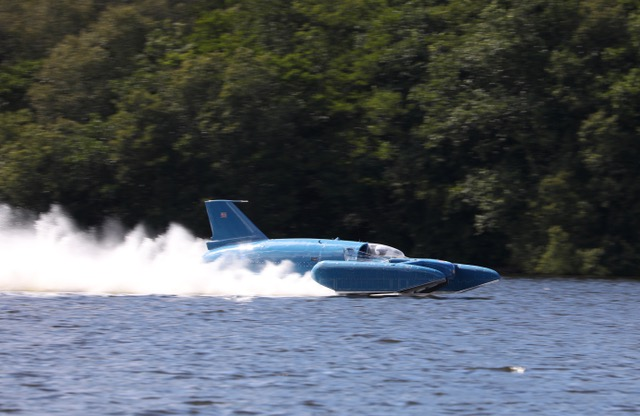
Rebuilt Bluebird K7 running at speed in planing mode on the waters of Loch Fad in 2018

After securing the necessary permissions from John Crichton-Stuart, 7th Marquess of Bute, the land owner, and from Scottish Natural Heritage (Central Lochs, Bute site of special scientific interest (SSSI) which required a Biosecurity statement), it was announced that Bluebird K7 would return to the water on Loch Fad, on the Isle of Bute in Scotland, in August 2018 for handling trials, once the restoration work on Bluebird was sufficiently advanced to be able to do so. She was transported to Loch Fad where she was refloated in the presence of Gina Campbell on 4 August 2018. Following initial engine tests on 5 August, Bluebird completed a series of test runs on the loch, reaching speeds of around 150 mph. The K7 trials were conducted in accordance with National Police Chiefs' Council (NPCC) recommendations.

The team confirmed that K7 conformed to its design standards throughout the trials. The thrust from the BS Orpheus engine initially peaked at some 80% throttle as the craft climbed out of the displacement mode and started to plane. This phenomenon is known as 'Hump Drag' as the craft requires additional power to overcome the turbulence caused by its own ploughing movement. Once in planing mode, the pilot was able to throttle back to some 50% of output allowing the craft to maintain a constant speed of approximately 100 mph. When slowing down, it was noticed that the planing mode was maintained down to speed of 30 mph before returning to displacement mode.

The paramount characteristic of K7's design was the ease and elegance with which it sped across the water, holding firm, once it was in planing mode. The remarkable feature of K7 is its capacity to displace so little water. At record-equalling speed, the wetted areas for each front plane (rear tip of each sponson) was calculated to be "13.2 square inches and 12.6 square inches for the rear (trailing edge of the hull)". Furthermore, "The immersion depth was a tiny 0.072" at the front and even less at the rear, 0.046""

== Civil litigation ==
In a legal case study response to the publication of a 2019 BBC News website article, Richard Skene of Aberdeen University School of Law commented: "... A reading of the report indicates that Smith, perhaps unwittingly, is resting an ownership case on accessio (that is to say, joining corporeal things together, with the old title of any less significant, accessory items being subsumed into the title of the main, principal item), or could it be specificatio (manufacturing an entirely new thing)?

On 24 February 2023, The Ruskin Museum served legal papers on William Hammerton Smith and The Bluebird Project to ensure that the rebuilt Bluebird K7 was handed to its owners, since the deed of gift granted in December 2006. The case was settled prior to a hearing after William Hammerton Smith and The Bluebird Project decided to "walk away" resulting in a Tomlin order, which confirmed that neither William Hammerton Smith or The Bluebird Project had any right, title or interest in the restored (but engineless) Bluebird K7 and all its parts. It also clarified an agreed proportion of the costs (£25,000) to be paid to the Ruskin museum, and ensured that K7 would be housed in the purpose-built Bluebird wing of the museum.

On 8 August 2024 Bill Smith failed in his long standing attempt to register the trademark 'thebluebirdproject' after opposition from Don Wales, nephew of Donald Campbell, Bill Smith was found to have been 'Passing Off' and making his application in 'Bad Faith'. Mr Wales was awarded a contribution towards his legal costs in the sum of £1026.50, which as at April 2025 remains unpaid. The registered company THE BLUEBIRD PROJECT remains unaffected.

== Bluebird K7 at The Ruskin Museum ==
In December 2022, The Ruskin Museum announced Lancashire-based WEC Group Ltd as its chosen engineering partners to maintain Bluebird K7 once she is returned to Coniston. Three Orpheus engines have also been donated to the Museum as The Ruskin Museum plan to run K7 on Coniston Water once it is returned. "The models of Orpheus the Ruskin have been gifted to date are two 803's and a single 101. 803's were made for the Fiat G91 aircraft and the 101's for the Folland Gnat aircraft."

As of April 2024, just one month since her return to Coniston, there had been 10,413 visits to see K7 at the Ruskin Museum, and that to date is more public views than at any time since the 1960s.

On 6 October 2024, Bluebird K7 was transported to Beaulieu Motor Museum where, under the direction of the Campbell family, and for a moment, it stood at the same site as Donald Campbell's Proteus Bluebird CN7, the first car to (officially) set a Land Speed Record in excess of 400 mph. Under the Ruskin Museum's and CFHT's initiative, Bluebird K7 was also taken briefly to the Royal Motor Yacht Club in Poole and displayed in Samlesbury where she was built in the mid 1950s.

The museum announced plans to run K7 on Coniston Water in 2026, and engaged an engineering company in North Weald, Essex to undertake overhaul and preparation of two Orpheus 101 engines. The second 101, purchased by the museum, was described as "in immaculate condition, complete with flight hours remaining and original relevant paperwork", with the other, donated, 101 to be used as a spare.

In February and March 2025, K7's new engine was tested at St. Athan. The boat, with engine inside, was then returned to the Ruskin Museum for display.
