= Leo Villa =

British racing mechanic (1899–1979)

- Born: Leopoldo Alfonso Villa; 30 November 1899; London, England
- Died: 31 January 1979 (aged 79)
- Occupation: Racing mechanic
- Employer(s): Sir Malcolm Campbell, later Donald Campbell.
- Spouse: Joan (m. 1924, d. 1978)

Leopoldo Alfonso Villa OBE (30 November 1899 – 18 January 1979) was the long-serving mechanic of Sir Malcolm Campbell and Donald Campbell. He was born in London, of Italian and Scottish parents.

== Birth and early career ==
Villa was born in London to an Italian father and a Scottish mother. A gifted artist, Villa drew many pictures of an automotive nature, and through his uncle he found employment as a riding mechanic with the Italian racing driver Giulio Foresti who held the British franchise for the Itala automobile. Between 1915 and 1922 Villa and Foresti were lucky to escape serious injury after a number of serious incidents when motor racing, but Villa's luck ran out and he was seriously burnt when a generator exploded during preparations for the French Grand Prix at Strasbourg in which Foresti was to drive a French Ballot. After a period of convalescence in England, Villa found himself on the shelf since Foresti had taken on another mechanic in Villa's absence.

== Record breaking ==
Not so long after, Villa had an offer that would set the path of his career for the rest of his life. The then Captain Malcolm Campbell owned the franchise for Ballot in England and raced one of its models at Brooklands, and was considering buying a new model for a Grand Prix campaign, so Foresti and Villa were despatched with the car that French star Jules Goux had driven in the Grand Prix Villa had missed. Campbell was so impressed with Villa's manner and ability he offered him a job, and though he was very much so Campbell's employee, Villa was to be a key part in Malcolm Campbell's nine land and four water world speed record attempts.

Not long after Sir Malcolm's death on New Year's Eve, 1948, Villa was approached by Sir Malcolm's son Donald Campbell with a proposition: the junior Campbell had heard that the Americans were planning an attempt on his father's world water speed record, and the fiercely patriotic Campbell wanted to push it out of their reach before they even got started. The older and wiser Villa wasn't against such an idea; he did, however, advise that record breaking was not as easy as Campbell thought it was, and once Campbell got started, he would be addicted for life. The headstrong young Campbell was not to be dissuaded, and so Villa found himself again playing chief mechanic to a Campbell's many record attempts.

However, this time round, far from being just an employee, Villa's relationship with the young Campbell was on a much more even keel; having watched Campbell grow up and having covered for him on numerous occasions so as he did not suffer the wrath of Sir Malcolm, he was held in great affection by Donald, who regularly referred to him as Unc.

After a somewhat rocky start to record breaking with Sir Malcolm's old boat Blue Bird K4 and a considerable investment by Campbell and others, they managed to get their first world water speed record as a team on Ullswater in 1955 with a jet-engined hydroplane called Bluebird K7. Campbell proved to be as adept at record breaking as his father, and he went on to set no fewer than 7 world water speed records and 1 world land speed record, with Villa being instrumental in every one.

It was a successful partnership that was only broken upon Campbell's death in 1967, whilst attempting his eighth world water speed record.

== Later life and death ==
After Campbell's death Villa spent his time at home in Reigate in Surrey with his wife Joan, where he took up gardening. He received an OBE in June 1967 (Confirmed in London Gazette 44326, June 1967) for services to land and water speed records. Villa was also granted the Freedom of the City of London and he went on to write three books about his record-breaking career, two of them written with Kevin Desmond. Villa died in January 1979 from lung cancer eight months after the death of his wife Joan.

== Publications ==
- Villa, Leo (1969). The Record Breakers, Sir Malcolm & Donald Campbell, Land and Water-speed kings of the 20th Century. London, UK: Hamlyn.
- Villa, Leo; Desmond, Kevin (1976). The World Water Speed Record. London, UK: Batsford. ISBN 978-0-71343-065-3.
- Villa, Leo; Desmond, Kevin (1979). Life with the Speed King. London, UK: Marshall Harris & Baldwin. ISBN 0-906116-06-6.
- de Lara, David; Desmond, Kevin; Villa, Leo (2007). Leo Villa's 3D album of the Bluebirds. London, UK: Transport Bookman Publications. ISBN 978-0-85184-071-0. Period 3D photographs taken by Leo Villa on a Stereo Realist camera given to him by Donald Campbell.
