= Coniston Water =

Lake in Cumbria, England

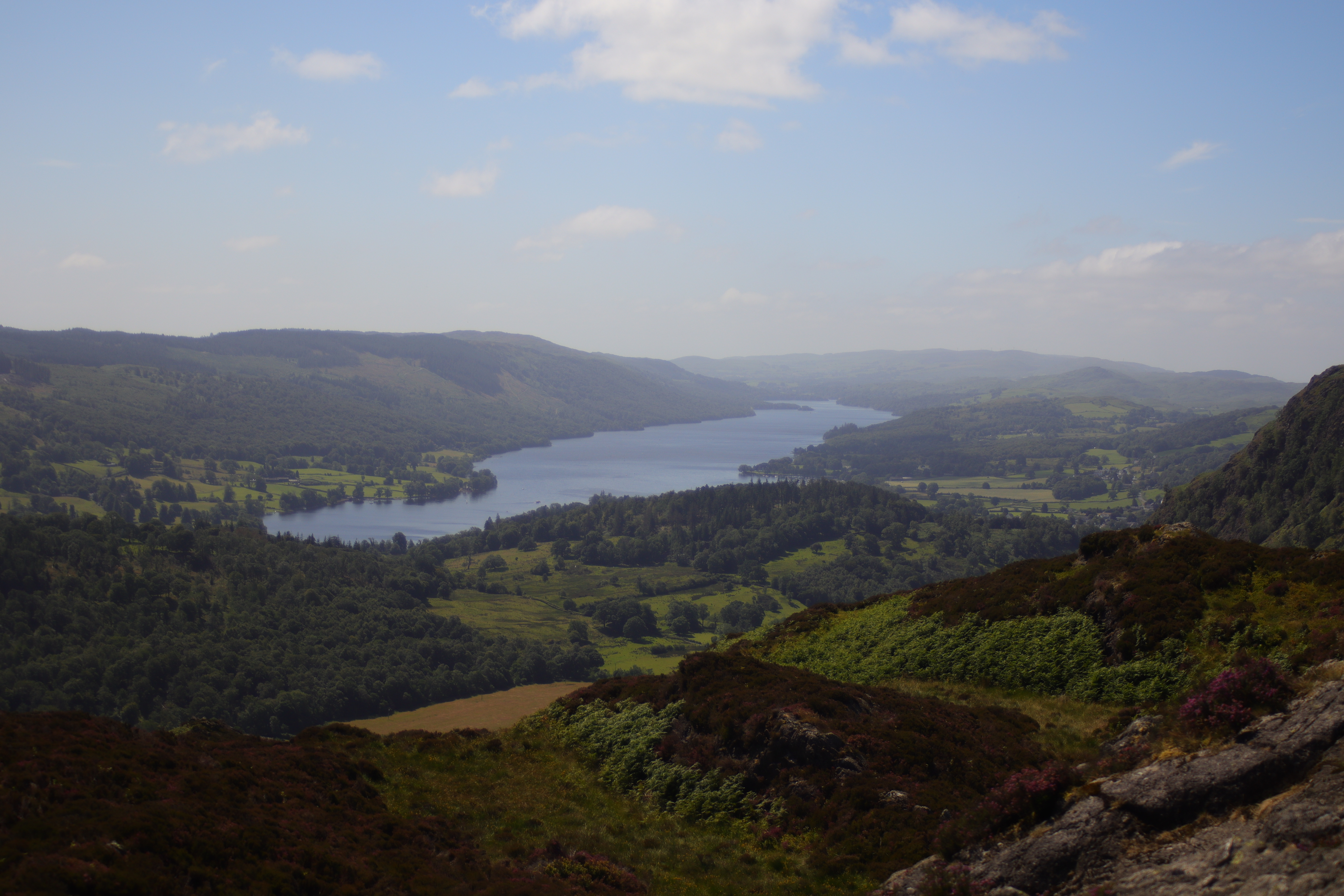
- View from Holme Fell, 1.5 miles (2.4 km) north

- Location in the Lake District National Park Location in South Lakeland, Cumbria
- Location: Lake District, Cumbria
- Coordinates: 54°21′N 3°04′W
- Primary outflows: River Crake
- Basin countries: United Kingdom
- Max. length: 8.8 km (5.5 mi)
- Max. width: 793 m (0.49 mi)
- Surface area: 4.7 km^{2} (1.8 sq mi)
- Average depth: 24.1 m (79.1 ft)
- Max. depth: 56.1 m (184.1 ft)
- Water volume: 1.133×10^{8} m^{3} (4.00×10^{9} cu ft)
- Residence time: 340 days
- Shore length^{1}: 20.2 km (12.6 mi)
- Surface elevation: 43.6 m (143 ft)
- Islands: 2; Peel Island, Oak Island. 1 partial; (at high water) Fir Island
- ^{1} Shore length is not a well-defined measure.

Coniston Water is a lake in the Lake District in North West England. It is the third largest by volume, after Windermere and Ullswater, and the fifth-largest by area. The lake has a length of 8.7 kilometres (5 3/8 mi), a maximum width of 730 metres (800 yd), and a maximum depth of 56.1 m (184 ft 1 in). Its outflow is the River Crake, which drains into Morecambe Bay via the estuary of the River Leven. The lake is in the unitary authority of Westmorland and Furness, and the ceremonial county of Cumbria.

== Geography and administration ==
Coniston Water is situated within Furness, part of the North Lonsdale exclave of the historic county of Lancashire. It has been within the ceremonial county of Cumbria since 1974, and the Westmorland and Furness district since it replaced South Lakeland in 2023.

The lake is an example of a ribbon lake formed by glaciation. The lake sits in a deep U-shaped glaciated valley scoured by a glacier in the surrounding volcanic and limestone rocks during the last ice age.

To the north-west of the lake rises the Old Man of Coniston, the highest fell in the Coniston Fells group and the highest point in the historic county of Lancashire.

== Toponymy ==
" 'The king's estate or village'. The second el.[ement] is OE tūn, and the whole name may, like numerous English Kingstons, be from OE 'cyninges-tūn'. ... Scand[inavian] influence is, meanwhile, shown by the '-o-' of early and modern spellings, and Ekwall speculated that this could have been the centre of a 'small Scandinavian mountain kingdom' ". Plus "OE 'wæter', with the meaning probably influenced by its ON relative 'vatn'." (OE=Old English; ON=Old Norse).

== History ==
Remains of agricultural settlements from the Bronze Age have been found near the shores of Coniston Water. The Romans mined copper from the fells above the lake. A potash kiln and two iron bloomeries show that industrial activity continued in medieval times. In the 13th and 14th centuries, Coniston Water was an important source of fish for the monks of Furness Abbey who owned the lake and much of the surrounding land. Copper mining continued in the area until the 19th century.

The lake was formerly known as "Thurston Water", a name derived from the Old Norse personal name 'Thursteinn' + Old English 'waeter'. This name was used as an alternative to Coniston Water until the late 18th century.

The Victorian artist and philosopher John Ruskin owned Brantwood House on the eastern shore of the lake, and lived in it from 1872 until his death in 1900. Ruskin is buried in the churchyard in the village of Coniston, at the northern end of the lake. His secretary the antiquarian W. G. Collingwood wrote a historical novel Thorstein of the Mere about the Northmen who settled on the island in the lake.

The Victorian and Edwardian artist Henry Robinson Hall settled in Coniston during the Great War and is buried in the parish church graveyard.

Arthur Ransome set his children's novel Swallows and Amazons and the sequels Swallowdale, Winter Holiday, Pigeon Post and The Picts and the Martyrs around a fictional lake derived from a combination of Coniston Water and Windermere. The fictional lake resembles Windermere, but the surrounding hills and fells resemble those of Coniston Water. Some of Coniston Water's islands and other local landmarks can be identified in the novels. In particular the books' Wild Cat Island with its secret harbour is based on Peel Island. The Amazon River is based on the River Crake. The Swallows and Amazons series involve school holiday adventures in the 1930s. The movie adaptation (2016) of these stories was also partly filmed on Peel Island, Coniston Water.

Historically, Coniston was part of Lancashire (North of the Sands), until Local Government reorganisation in 1974 when Cumbria was created.

== Boating ==
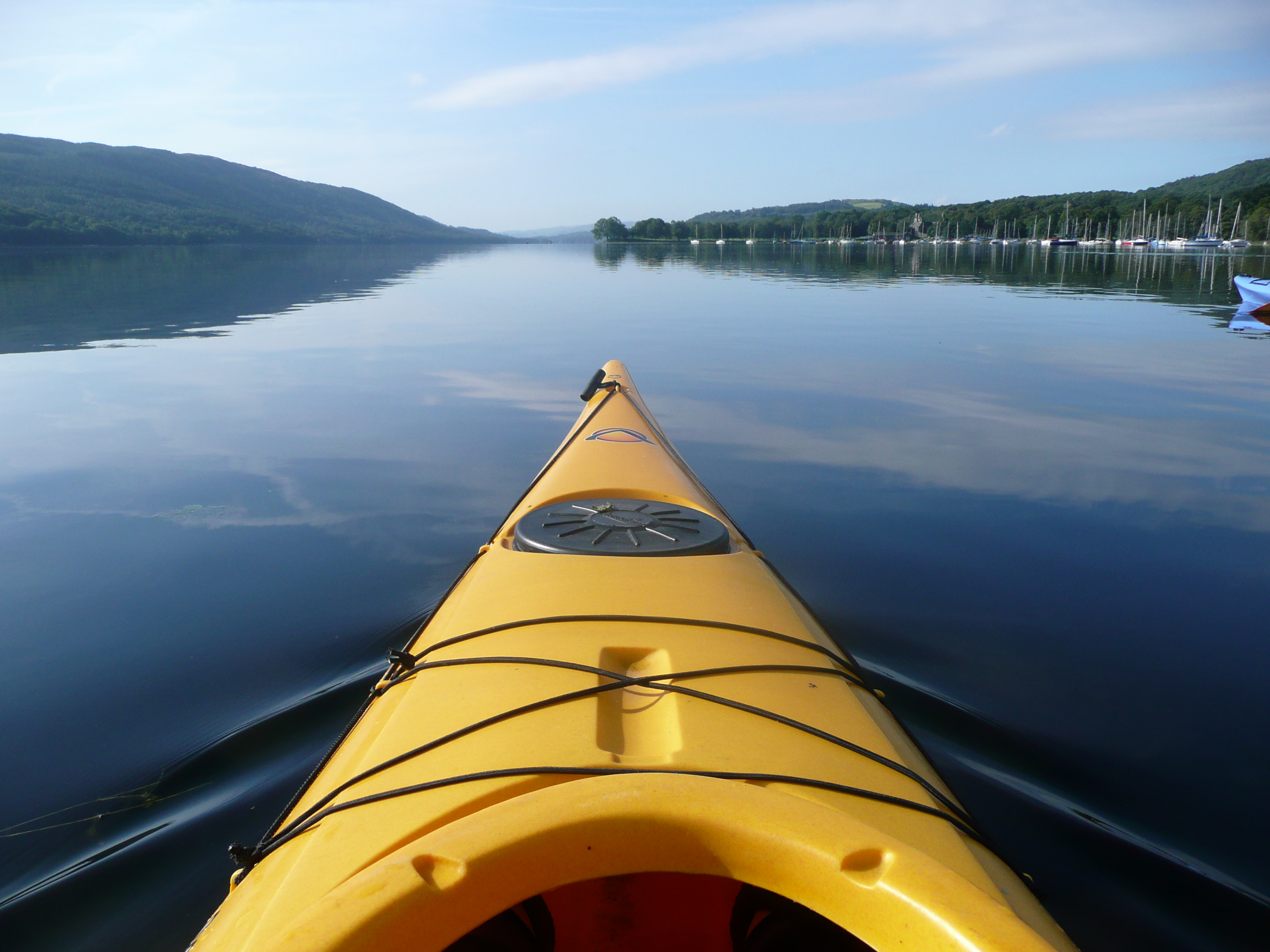
Kayaker's view of the lake

The lake is ideal for kayaking and canoeing and there are a number of good sites for launching and recovery. It is paddled as the second leg of the Three Lakes Challenge. The steam yacht Gondola tours the lake in the summer months, along with two smaller motorised launches (Campbell (previously Exonia and Cygnet).

Boats can be hired from the lakeside near the steam yacht, with various sizes of boat for hire, from small canoes and kayaks to large personal craft. Along with Ullswater and Derwentwater, Coniston Water has a mandatory waterspeed limit of 10 miles per hour (8.7 kn; 16 km/h). This is suspended temporarily for boats attempting new world waterspeed records during Records Week, usually the first week in November.

== Water speed records - the Campbells ==
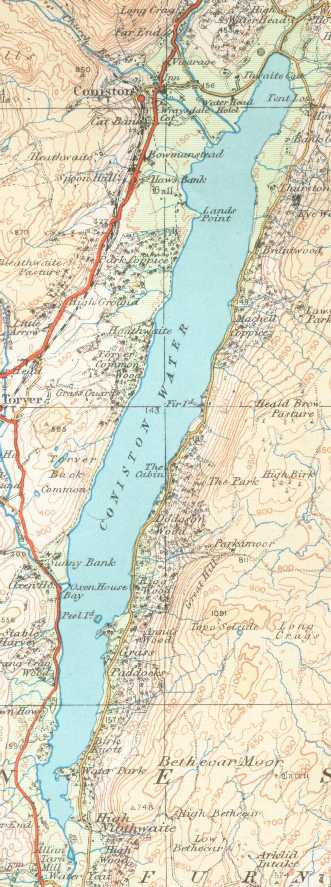
An Ordnance Survey map of Coniston Water from 1925

In the 20th century Coniston Water was the scene of many attempts to break the world water speed record. On 19 August 1939 Sir Malcolm Campbell set the record at 141.74 miles per hour (228.108 km/h or 123.168 kn) in Blue Bird K4. Between 1956 and 1959 Sir Malcolm's son Donald Campbell set four successive records on the lake in Bluebird K7, a hydroplane; in 1967 he was killed just after achieving a speed of over 320 miles per hour (515 km/h or 278 kn) in Bluebird K7 in a record-breaking attempt.

== Coniston Power Boat Records Week ==
Coniston Power Boat Records Week is an annual powerboat speed record event held on Coniston Water each November, organised by the Windermere Motor Boat Racing Club. The event brings together all classes of powerboat to attempt British and world speed records over a measured kilometre course.

The inaugural BP National Powerboat Record Attempts took place on Windermere in October 1970, with Norman Buckley instrumental in establishing the event. Following the introduction of a 10mph speed limit on Windermere in 2005, Records Week relocated to Coniston Water, regarded as the spiritual home of water speed record breaking due to the lake's association with the Campbell family.

The lake's speed limit is temporarily suspended during the event, which is run by approximately 60 volunteers. Successful record holders receive the K7 Silver Star, honouring Donald Campbell's Bluebird K7.

In November 2023, nine-year-old Tate Mantripp from Lowestoft became the youngest competitor in the 51-year history of Records Week to set a speed record, achieving 39.16mph in the GT15 class.

== Lady in the Lake ==
In recent times, Coniston Water has become known for a controversial murder case. Mrs Carol Park was dubbed the "Lady in the Lake" after the Raymond Chandler novel of the same name.

== In art and literature ==
Letitia Elizabeth Landon's escapist poem "Coniston Water" illustrates an engraving of a painting entitled Coniston Water from Nebthwaite, Lancashire by Thomas Allom.

In 1995, the music video for Kadim Al Sahir's "Ha Habibi" ("Hey, My Beloved") was filmed at the Sunny Bank area near Coniston Water.

== Gallery ==
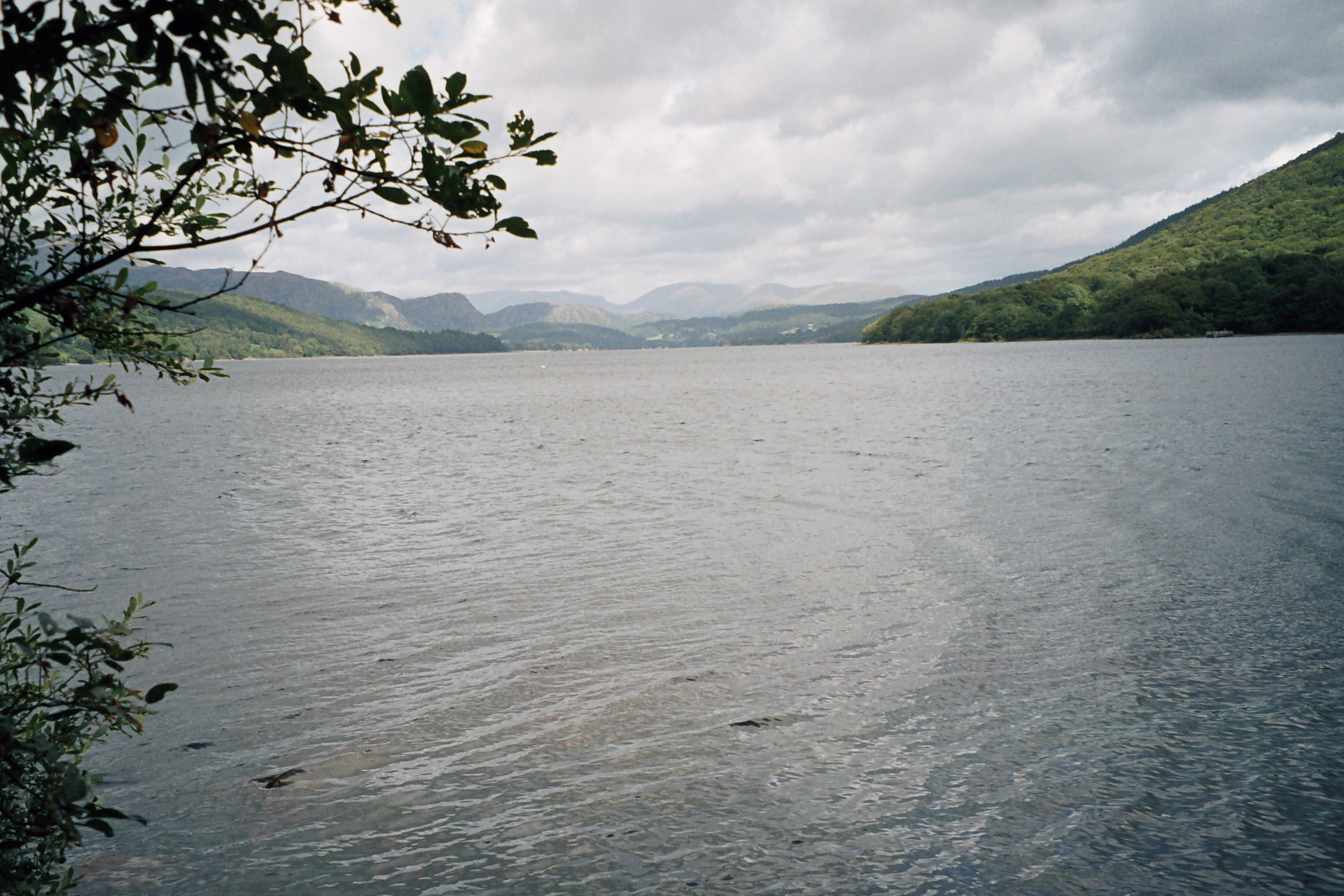
View from Peel Island facing north with Helvellyn in the distant background.

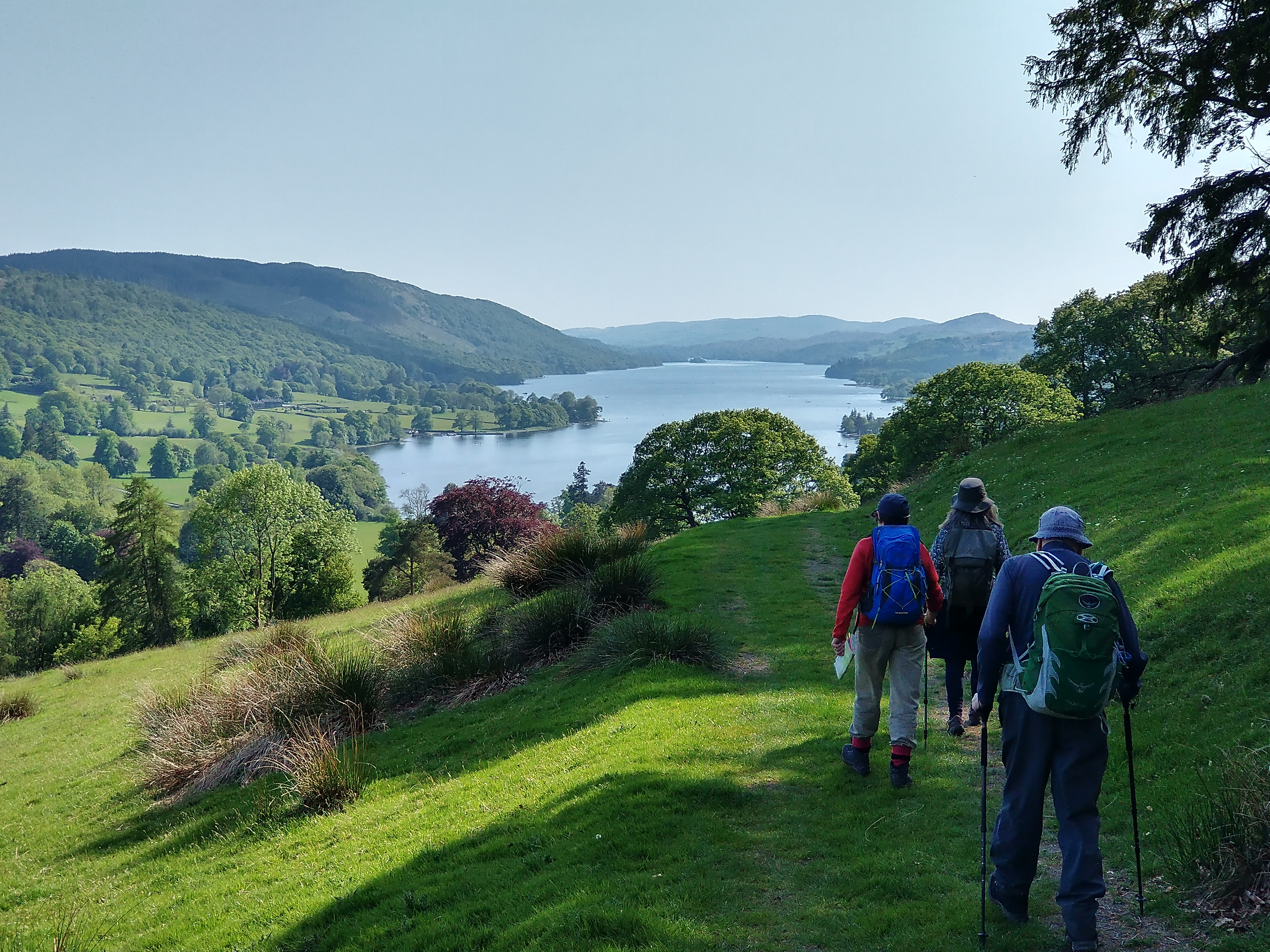
Looking south from fells onto Coniston Water.

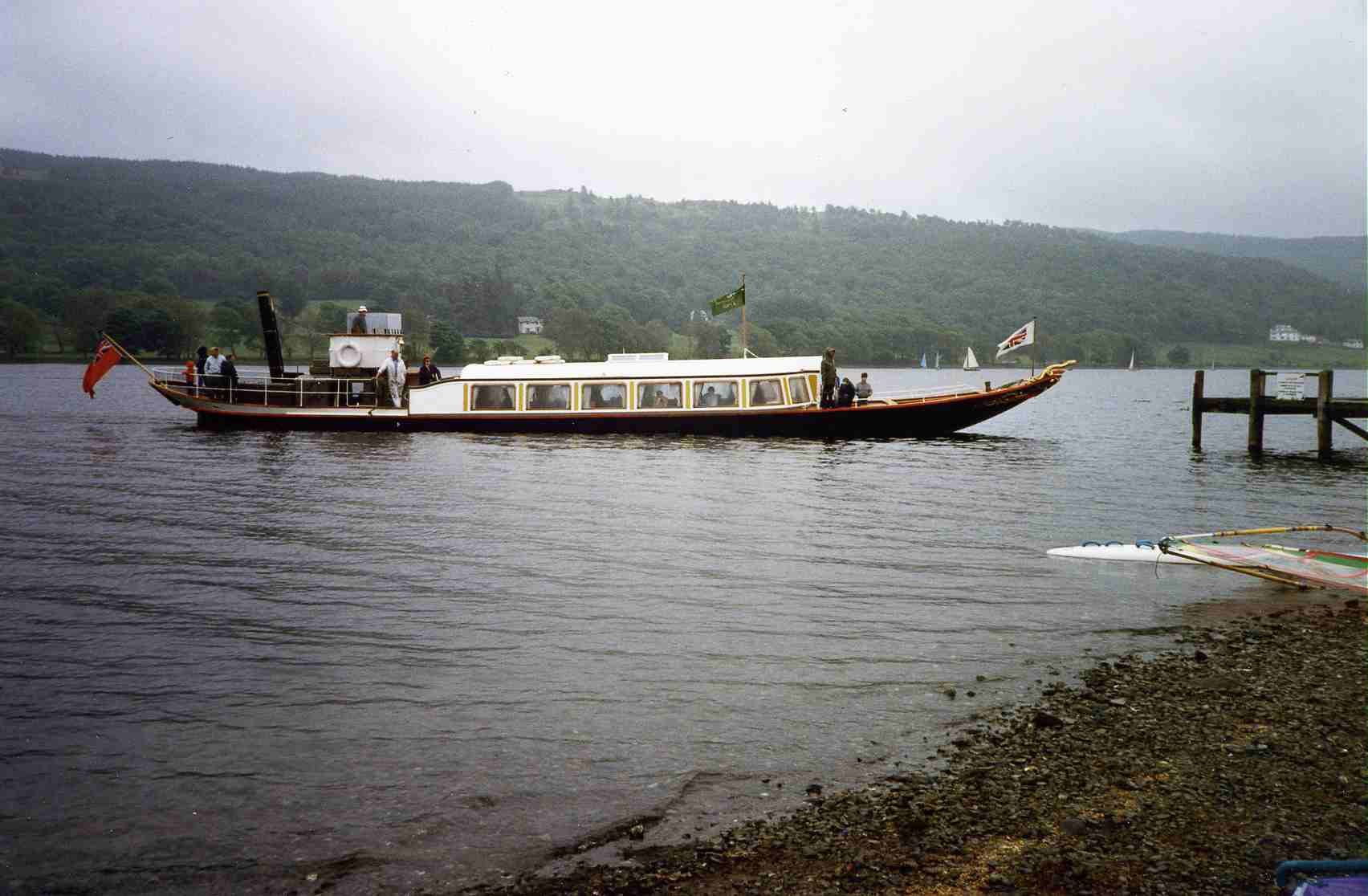
Steam yacht Gondola at Coniston Pier.

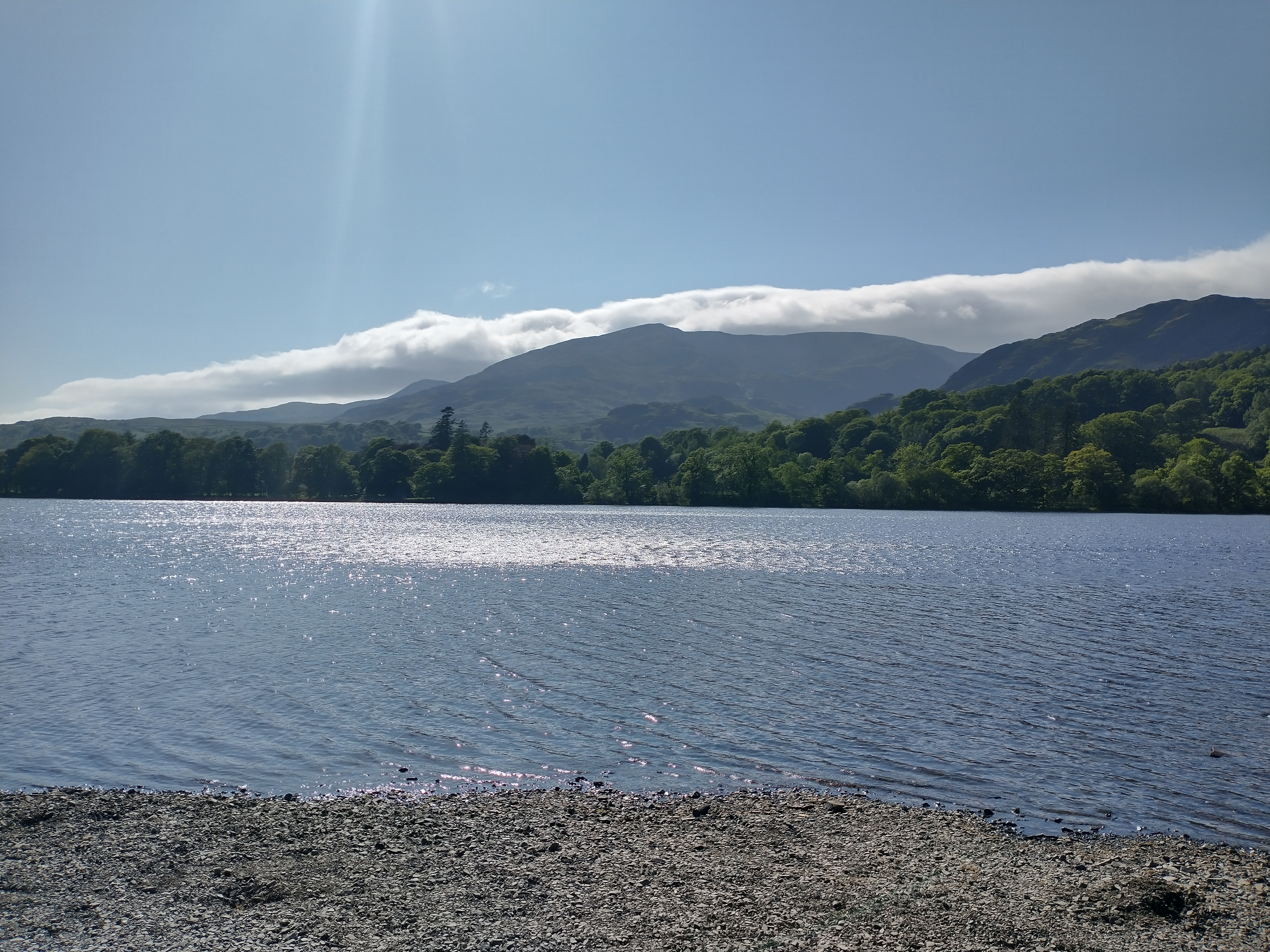
Old Man of Coniston from Coniston Water north.
