= Donald Campbell =

British land and water speed record holder (1921–1967)

Donald Campbell CBE
- Campbell in 1957
- Born: Donald Malcolm Campbell; 23 March 1921; Kingston upon Thames, Surrey, England
- Died: 4 January 1967 (aged 45); Coniston Water, Lancashire, England
- Cause of death: High-speed crash during water speed record attempt
- Body discovered: 28 May 2001
- Resting place: Parish Cemetery, Hawkshead Old Road, Coniston
- Other name: "The Skipper"
- Occupation: Speed record breaker
- Known for: Most prolific water speed record breaker of all time
- Spouses: Daphne Harvey (m. 1945–1951) Dorothy McKegg (m. 1952–1957) Tonia Bern (m. 1958)
- Children: 1
- Parent(s): Malcolm Campbell; Dorothy Evelyn Whittall
- Awards: Segrave Trophy (1955)

Donald Malcolm Campbell (23 March 1921 – 4 January 1967) was a British speed record breaker who broke eight absolute world speed records on water and on land in the 1950s and 1960s. He remains the only person to set both world land and water speed records in the same year (1964). He died during a water speed record attempt at Coniston Water in the Lake District, England.

== Family and personal life ==
Donald Malcolm Campbell was born at Canbury House, Kingston upon Thames, Surrey, the son of Malcolm, later Sir Malcolm Campbell, holder of 13 world speed records in the 1920s and 1930s in the Bluebird cars and boats, and his second wife, Dorothy Evelyn (née Whittall).

Campbell attended St Peter's School, Seaford in East Sussex, and Uppingham School in Rutland. At the outbreak of the Second World War he volunteered for the Royal Air Force, but was unable to serve because of a case of childhood rheumatic fever. He joined Briggs Motor Bodies Ltd in West Thurrock, where he became a maintenance engineer. Subsequently, he was a shareholder in a small engineering company called Kine Engineering, producing machine tools. Following his father's death on 31 December 1948 and aided by Malcolm's chief engineer, Leo Villa, the younger Campbell strove to set speed records first on water and then land.

He married three times – to Daphne Harvey in 1945, producing a daughter Georgina "Gina" Campbell on 19 September 1949; to Dorothy McKegg (1928–2008) in 1952; and to Tonia Bern (1928–2021) in December 1958, a union that lasted until his death in 1967. Campbell was intensely superstitious, hating the colour green, the number thirteen and believing nothing good ever happened on a Friday. He also had some interest in the paranormal, which he nurtured as a member of the Ghost Club.

== Water speed records ==
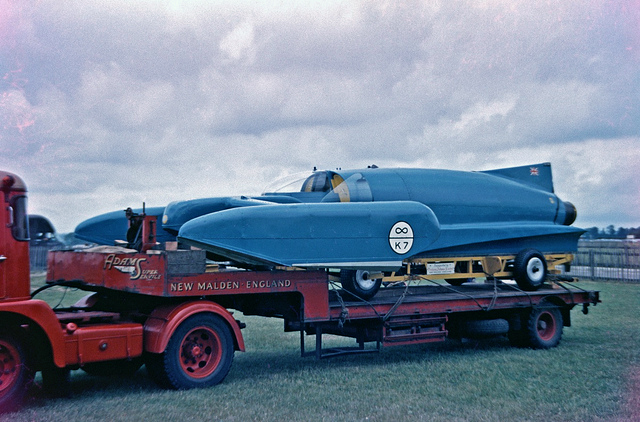
Bluebird K7 on display at Goodwood Motor Racing circuit in 1960

Campbell began his speed record attempts in the summer of 1949, using his father's old boat, Blue Bird K4, which he renamed Bluebird K4. His initial attempts that summer were unsuccessful, although he did come close to raising his father's existing record. The team returned to Coniston Water, Lancashire in 1950 for further trials. While there, they heard that an American, Stanley Sayres, had raised the record from 141 to 160 mph (227 to 257 km/h), beyond K4's capabilities without substantial modification.

In late 1950 and 1951, Bluebird K4 was modified to make it a "prop-rider" as opposed to her original immersed propeller configuration. This greatly reduced hydrodynamic drag: The third planing point would now be the propeller hub, meaning one of the two propeller blades was always out of the water at high speed. She now sported two cockpits, the second one being for Leo Villa.

Bluebird K4 now had a chance of exceeding Sayres' record and also enjoyed success as a circuit racer, winning the Oltranza Cup in Italy in the spring of that year. Returning to Coniston in September, they finally got Bluebird up to 170 mph (270 km/h) after further trials, only to suffer a structural failure at 170 mph (270 km/h) which wrecked the boat. Sayres raised the record the following year to 178 mph (286 km/h) in Slo-Mo-Shun IV.

Along with Campbell, Britain had another potential contender for water speed record honours – John Cobb. He had commissioned the world's first purpose-built turbojet Hydroplane, Crusader, with a target speed of over 200 mph (320 km/h), and began trials on Loch Ness in autumn 1952. Cobb was killed later that year, when Crusader broke up, during an attempt on the record. Campbell was devastated at Cobb's loss, but he resolved to build a new Bluebird boat to bring the water speed record back to Britain.

In early 1953, Campbell began development of his own advanced all-metal jet-powered Bluebird K7 hydroplane to challenge the record, by now held by the American prop rider hydroplane Slo-Mo-Shun IV.[1] Designed by Ken and Lew Norris, the K7 was a steel-framed, aluminium-bodied, three-point hydroplane with a Metropolitan-Vickers Beryl axial-flow turbojet engine, producing 3,500-pound-force (16 kN) of thrust.

Like Slo-Mo-Shun, but unlike Cobb's tricycle Crusader, the three planing points were arranged with two forward, on outrigged sponsons and one aft, in a "pickle-fork" layout, prompting Bluebird's early comparison to a blue lobster. K7 was of very advanced design and construction, and its load bearing steel space frame ultra rigid and stressed to 25 times the force of gravity (exceeding contemporary military jet aircraft). It had a design speed of 250 mph (400 km/h) and remained the only successful jet-boat in the world until the late 1960s.

The designation "K7" was derived from its Lloyd's unlimited rating registration. It was carried on a prominent white roundel on each sponson, underneath an infinity symbol. Bluebird K7 was the seventh boat registered at Lloyds in the "Unlimited" series.

Campbell set seven world water speed records in K7 between July 1955 and December 1964. The first of these marks was set at Ullswater on 23 July 1955, where he achieved a speed of 202.32 mph (325.60 km/h) but only after many months of trials and a major redesign of Bluebird's forward sponson attachments points. Campbell achieved a steady series of subsequent speed-record increases with the boat during the rest of the decade, beginning with a mark of 216 mph (348 km/h) in 1955 on Lake Mead in Nevada. Subsequently, four new marks were registered on Coniston Water, where Campbell and Bluebird became an annual fixture in the latter half of the 1950s, enjoying significant sponsorship from the Mobil oil company and then subsequently BP.

Campbell also made an attempt in the summer of 1957 at Canandaigua, New York, which failed due to lack of suitable calm water conditions. Bluebird K7 became a well known and popular attraction, and as well as her annual Coniston appearances, K7 was displayed extensively in the UK, United States, Canada and Europe, and then subsequently in Australia during Campbell's prolonged attempt on the land speed record in 1963–1964.

To extract more speed, and endow the boat with greater high-speed stability, in both pitch and yaw, K7 was subtly modified in the second half of the 1950s to incorporate more effective streamlining with a blown Perspex cockpit canopy and fluting to the lower part of the main hull. In 1958, a small wedge shaped tail fin, housing an arrester parachute, modified sponson fairings, that gave a significant reduction in forward aerodynamic lift, and a fixed hydrodynamic stabilising fin, attached to the transom to aid directional stability, and exert a marginal down-force on the nose were incorporated into the design to increase the safe operating envelope of the hydroplane. Thus she reached 225 mph (362 km/h) in 1956, where an unprecedented peak speed of 286.78 mph (461.53 km/h) was achieved on one run, 239 mph (385 km/h) in 1957, 248 mph (399 km/h) in 1958 and 260 mph (420 km/h) in 1959.

Campbell was appointed Commander of the British Empire (CBE) in January 1957 for his water speed record breaking, and in particular his record at Lake Mead in the United States which earned him and Britain very positive acclaim.

On 23 November 1964, Campbell achieved the Australian water speed record of 216 miles per hour (348 km/h) on Lake Bonney Riverland in South Australia, although he was unable to break the world record on that attempt.

== Land speed record attempt ==
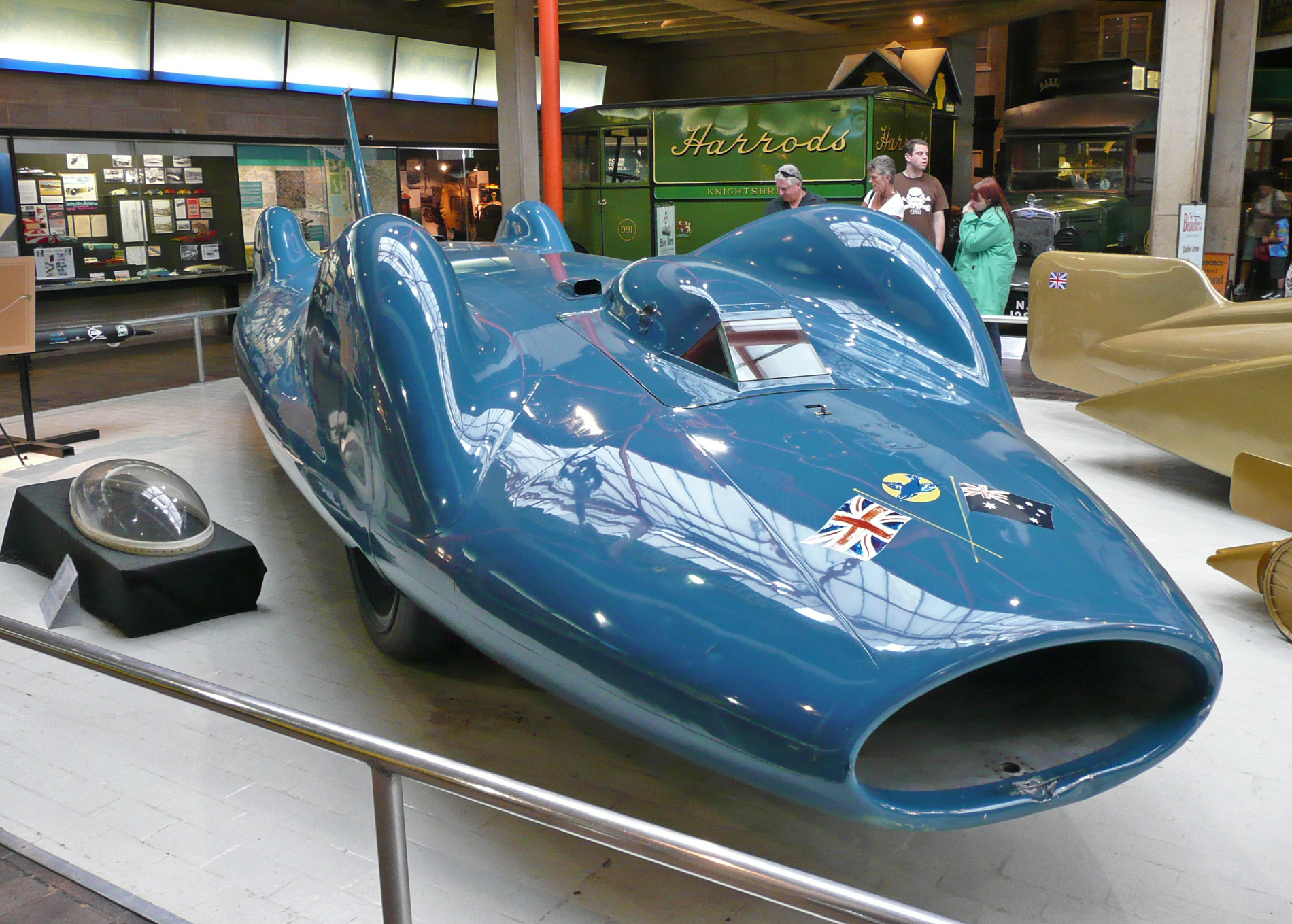
Bluebird CN7 on display at the National Motor Museum in Beaulieu.

It was after the Lake Mead water speed record success in 1955 that the seeds of Campbell's ambition to hold the land speed record as well were planted. The following year, the serious planning was under way – to build a car to break the land speed record, which then stood at 394 mph (634 km/h) set by John Cobb in 1947. The Norris brothers designed Bluebird-Proteus CN7 with 500 mph (800 km/h) in mind.

The British motor industry, in the guise of Dunlop, BP, Smiths Industries, Lucas Automotive, Rubery Owen as well as many others, became heavily involved in the project to build the most advanced car the world had yet seen. CN7 was powered by a specially modified Bristol-Siddeley Proteus free-turbine engine of 4,450 shp (3.32 MW) driving all four wheels. Bluebird CN7 was designed to achieve 475–500 mph (760–800 km/h) and was completed by the spring of 1960.

Following low-speed tests conducted at the Goodwood motor racing circuit in Sussex, in July, the CN7 was taken to the Bonneville Salt Flats in Utah, United States, scene of his father's last land speed record triumph, some 25 years earlier in September 1935. The trials initially went well, and various adjustments were made to the car. On the sixth run in CN7, Campbell lost control at over 360 mph (580 km/h) and crashed. It was the car's tremendous structural integrity that saved his life. He was hospitalised with a fractured skull and a burst eardrum, as well as minor cuts and bruises, but CN7 was a write-off. Almost immediately, Campbell announced he was determined to have another go. Sir Alfred Owen, whose Rubery Owen industrial group had built CN7, offered to rebuild it for him. That single decision was to have a profound influence on the rest of Campbell's life. His original plan had been to break the land speed record at over 400 mph (640 km/h) in 1960, return to Bonneville the following year to really bump up the speed to something near to 500 mph (800 km/h), get his seventh water speed record with K7 and then retire.

Campbell decided not to go back to Utah for the new trials. He felt the Bonneville course was too short at 11-mile (18 km) and the salt surface was in poor condition. BP offered to find another venue and eventually after a long search, Lake Eyre, in South Australia, was chosen. It hadn't rained there for nine years and the vast dry bed of the salt lake offered a course of up to 20-mile (32 km). By the summer of 1962, Bluebird CN7 was rebuilt, some nine months later than Campbell had hoped. It was essentially the same car, but with the addition of a large stabilising tail fin and a reinforced fibreglass cockpit cover. At the end of 1962, CN7 was shipped out to Australia ready for the new attempt. Low-speed runs had just started when the rains came. The course was compromised and further rain meant, that by May 1963, Lake Eyre was flooded to a depth of 3 in (80 mm), causing the attempt to be abandoned. Campbell was heavily criticised in the press for alleged time wasting and mismanagement of the project, despite the fact that he could hardly be held responsible for the unprecedented weather.

To make matters worse for Campbell, American Craig Breedlove drove his pure thrust jet car "Spirit of America" to a speed of 407.45 miles per hour (655.73 km/h) at Bonneville in July 1963. Although the "car" did not conform to FIA (Federation Internationale de L'Automobile) regulations, that stipulated it had to be wheel-driven and have a minimum of four wheels, in the eyes of the world, Breedlove was now the fastest man on Earth.

Campbell returned to Australia in March 1964, but the Lake Eyre course failed to fulfil the early promise it had shown in 1962 and there were further spells of rain. BP pulled out as his main sponsor after a dispute, but he was able to secure backing from Australian oil company Ampol.

The track never properly dried out and Campbell was forced to make the best of the conditions. Finally, in July 1964, he was able to post some speeds that approached the record. On the 17th of that month, he took advantage of a break in the weather and made two courageous runs along the shortened and still damp track, posting a new land speed record of 403.10 mph (648.73 km/h). The surreal moment was captured in a number of well-known images by photographers, including Australia's Jeff Carter.

Campbell was bitterly disappointed with the record as the vehicle had been designed for much higher speeds. CN7 covered the final third of the measured mile at an average of 429 mph (690 km/h), peaking as it left the measured distance at over 440 mph (710 km/h). He resented the fact that it had all been so difficult. "We've made it – we got the bastard at last", was his reaction to the success. Campbell's 403.1 mph (648.7 km/h) represented the official land speed record.

In 1969, after Campbell's fatal accident, his widow, Tonia Bern-Campbell negotiated a deal with Lynn Garrison, president of Craig Breedlove and Associates, that would see Craig Breedlove run Bluebird on Bonneville's Salt Flats. This concept was cancelled when the parallel Spirit of America supersonic car project failed to find support.

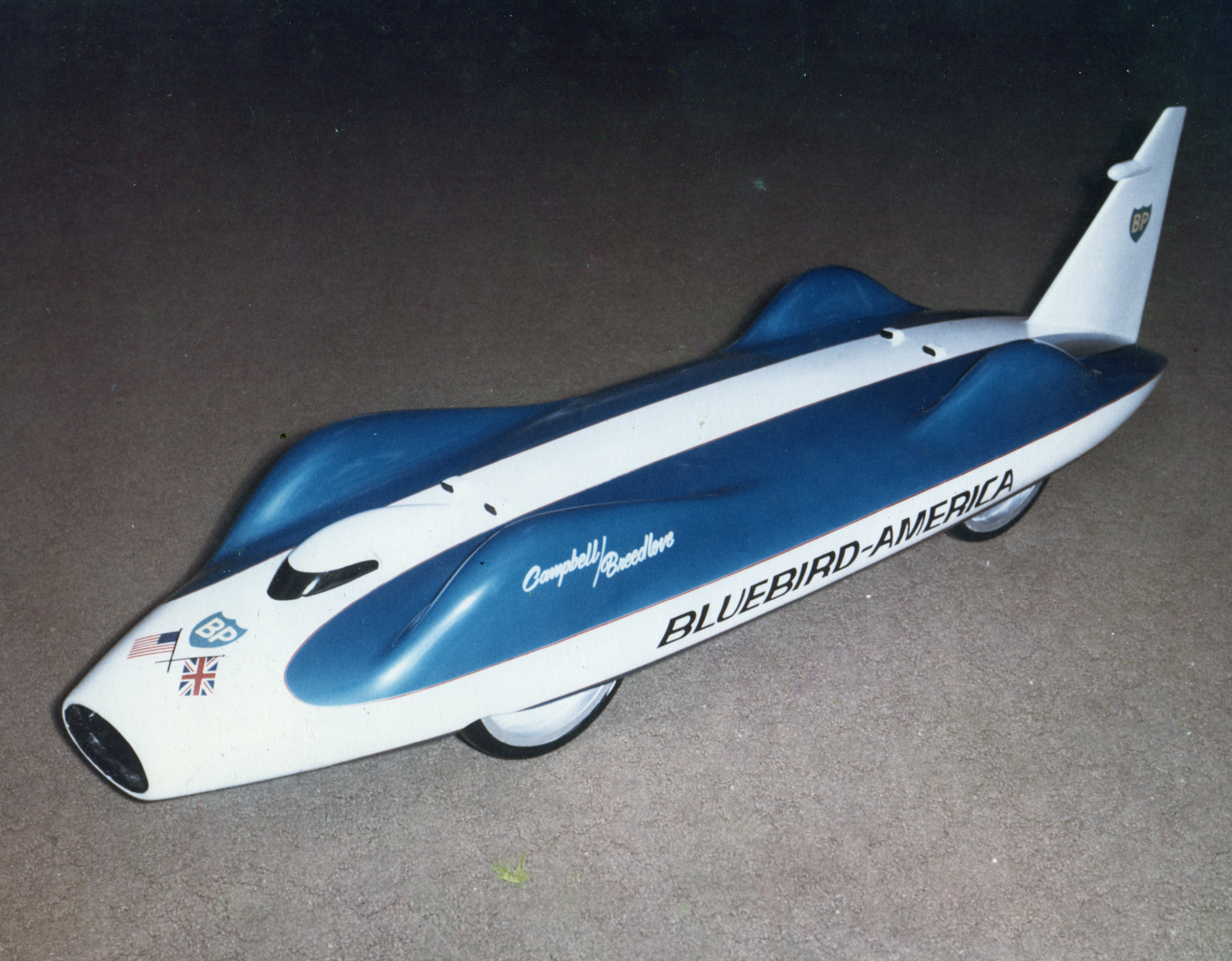
Model of Donald Campbell Bluebird used in Breedlove promotion

== Double records ==
Campbell now planned to go after the water speed record one more time with Bluebird K7 – to do what he had aimed for so many years earlier, during the initial planning stages of CN7 – break both records in the same year. After more delays, he finally achieved his seventh water speed record at Lake Dumbleyung near Perth, Western Australia, on the last day of 1964, at a speed of 276.33 mph (444.71 km/h). He had become the first, and so far only, person to set both land and water speed records in the same year.

Campbell's land speed record was short-lived, because FIA rule changes meant that pure jet cars would be eligible to set records from October 1964. Campbell's 429 mph (690 km/h) speed on his final Lake Eyre run remained the highest speed achieved by a wheel-driven car until 2001; Bluebird CN7 is now on display at the National Motor Museum at Beaulieu in Hampshire, England, its potential only partly realised.

== Rocket car plans and final water speed record attempt ==
=== Bluebird Mach 1.1 ===
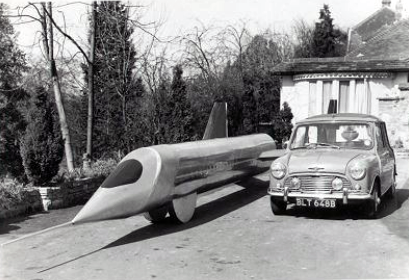
Promotional model of Bluebird Mach 1.1 displayed outside Campbell's house in spring 1966.

Campbell decided a massive jump in speed was called for following his successful 1964 land speed record attempt in Bluebird CN7. His vision was of a supersonic rocket car with a potential maximum speed of 840 mph (1,350 km/h). Norris Brothers were requested to undertake a design study. Bluebird Mach 1.1 was a design for a rocket-powered supersonic land speed record car. Campbell chose a lucky date to hold a press conference at the Charing Cross Hotel on 7 July 1965 to announce his future record breaking plans:

In terms of speed on the Earth's surface, my next logical step must be to construct a Bluebird car that can reach Mach 1.1. The Americans are already making plans for such a vehicle and it would be tragic for the world image of British technology if we did not compete in this great contest and win. The nation whose technologies are first to seize the 'faster than sound' record on land will be the nation whose industry will be seen to leapfrog into the '70s or '80s. We can have the car on the track within three years.

Bluebird Mach 1.1 was to be rocket-powered. Ken Norris had calculated using rocket motors would result in a vehicle with very low frontal area, greater density, and lighter weight than if he were to employ a jet engine. Bluebird Mach 1.1 would also be a relatively compact and simple design. Norris specified two off-the-shelf Bristol Siddeley BS.605 rocket engines. The 605 had been developed as a rocket-assisted take-off engine for military aircraft and was fuelled with kerosene, using hydrogen peroxide as the oxidiser. Each engine was rated at 8,000 lbf (36 kN) thrust. In Bluebird Mach 1.1 application, the combined 16,000 lbf (71 kN) thrust would be equivalent of 36,000 bhp (27,000 kW; 36,000 PS) at 840 mph (1,350 km/h).

=== Final record attempt ===
To increase publicity for his rocket car venture, in the spring of 1966, Campbell decided to try once more for a water speed record. This time the target was 300 mph (480 km/h). Bluebird K7 was fitted with a lighter and more powerful Bristol Orpheus engine (number 711) with 4,500 pounds-force (20,000 N) of thrust, taken from a Folland Gnat jet aircraft (XM691) from Dunsfold Aerodrome purchased from the Ministry of Defence for £200. The modified boat was taken back to Coniston in the first week of November 1966. The trials did not go well. The weather was very poor, and K7 suffered an engine failure when her air intakes collapsed and debris was drawn into the engine. By the middle of December, some high-speed runs were made, in excess of 250 mph (400 km/h) but still well below Campbell's existing record. Problems with Bluebird's fuel system meant that the engine could not reach full speed, and so would not develop maximum power. Eventually, by the end of December, after further modifications to her fuel system, and the replacement of a fuel pump, the fuel starvation problem was fixed, and Campbell awaited better weather to mount an attempt.

== Death ==
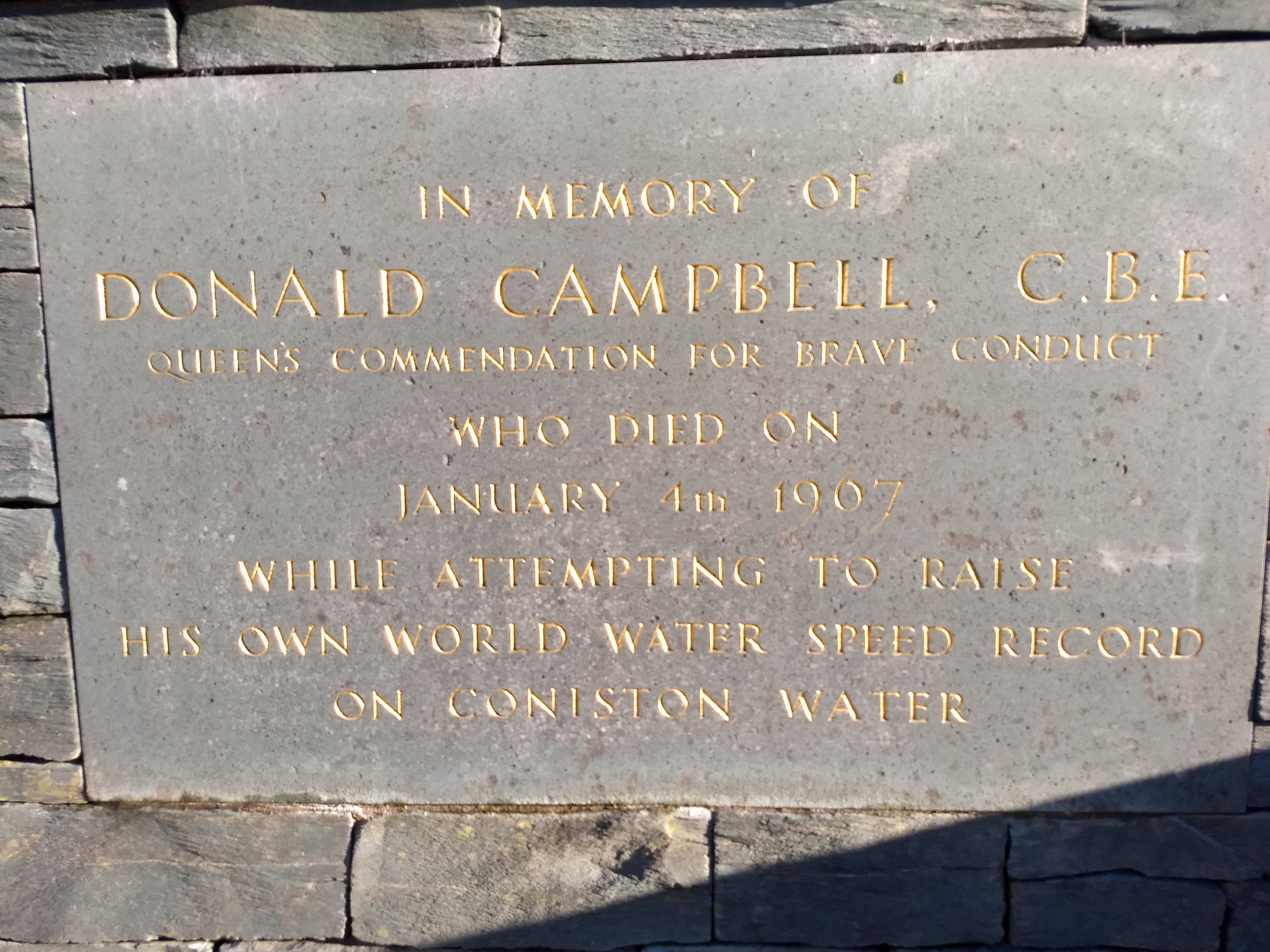
Memorial plaque for Donald Campbell, in Coniston village

On 4 January 1967, weather conditions were finally suitable for an attempt. Campbell commenced the first run of his last record attempt at just after 8:45 am. Bluebird moved slowly out towards the middle of the lake, where she paused briefly as Campbell lined her up. With a deafening blast of power, Campbell now applied full throttle and Bluebird began to surge forward. Clouds of spray issued from the jet-pipe, water poured over the rear spar and after a few hundred yards, at 70 miles per hour (113 km/h), Bluebird unstuck from the surface and rocketed off towards the southern end of the lake, producing her characteristic comet's tail of spray. She entered the measured kilometre at 8:46 am. Leo Villa witnessed her passing the first marker buoy at about 285 mph (459 km/h) in perfect steady planing trim, her nose slightly down, still accelerating. 7.525 seconds later, Keith Harrison saw her leave the measured kilometre at a speed of over 310 mph (500 km/h).

The average speed for the first run was 297.6 mph (478.9 km/h). Campbell lifted his foot from the throttle about 3/10 of a second before passing the southern kilometre marker. As Bluebird left the measured kilometre, Keith Harrison and Eric Shaw in a course boat at the southern end of the measured kilometre both noticed that she was very light around the bows, riding on her front stabilising fins. Her planing trim was no worse than she had exhibited when equipped with the Beryl engine, but it was markedly different from that observed by Leo Villa at the northern end of the kilometre, when she was under full acceleration. Campbell had made his usual commentary throughout the run.

Campbell's words on his first run were, via radio intercom:

I'm under way, all systems normal; brake swept up, er ... air pressure warning light on ... I'm coming onto track now and er ... I'll open up just as soon as I am heading down the lake, er doesn't look too smooth from here, doesn't matter, here we go ... Here we go ... [pause 3 seconds] ... Passing through four ... five coming up ... a lot of water, nose beginning to lift, water all over the front of the engine again ... and the nose is up ... low pressure fuel warning light ... going left ... OK we're up and away ... and passing through er ... tramping very hard at 150 ... very hard indeed ... FULL POWER ... Passing through 2 ... 25 out of the way ... tramping like hell Leo, I don't think I can get over the top, but I'll try, FULL HOUSE ... and I can't see where I am ... FULL HOUSE – FULL HOUSE – FULL HOUSE ... POWER OFF NOW! ... I'M THROUGH! ... power ... (garbled) er passing through 25 vector off Peel Island ... passing through 2 ... I'm lighting like mad ... brake gone down ... er ... engine lighting up now ... relighting ... passing Peel Island ... relight made normal ... and now ... down at Brown Howe ... passing through 100 ... er ... nose hasn't dropped yet ... nose down.

Instead of refuelling and waiting for the wash of this run to subside, Campbell decided to make the return run immediately. Campbell had already restarted the engine and so there was no gas pressure left in the Lucas Rotax air-start tanks for another restart after refuelling. This was not an unprecedented diversion from normal practice, as Campbell had used the advantage presented; i.e., no encroachment of water disturbances on the measured kilometre by the quick turnaround in many previous runs. The second run was even faster once severe tramping subsided on the run-up from Peel Island (caused by the water-brake disturbance). Once smooth water was reached some 700 metres (766 yd) or so from the start of the kilometre, K7 demonstrated cycles of ground effect hovering before accelerating hard at 0.63 g to a peak speed of 328 mph (528 km/h) some 200 metres or so from the southern marker buoy. Bluebird was now experiencing bouncing episodes of the starboard sponson with increasing ferocity.

At the peak speed, the most intense and long-lasting bounce precipitated a severe decelerating episode – 328 miles per hour (528 km/h) to 296 miles per hour (476 km/h), -1.86g – as K7 dropped back onto the water. Engine flame-out then occurred and, shorn of thrust nose-down momentum, K7 experienced a gliding episode in strong ground effect with increasing angle-of-attack, before completely leaving the water at her static stability pitch-up limit of 5.2°. Bluebird then executed an almost complete backflip (~ 320° and slightly off-axis) before plunging into the water (port sponson marginally in advance of the starboard), approximately 230 metres from the end of the measured kilometre. The boat then cartwheeled across the water before coming to rest. The impact killed Campbell instantly and broke K7 forward of the air intakes (where Campbell was sitting), and the main hull sank shortly afterwards.

Mr Whoppit, Campbell's teddy bear mascot, was found among the floating debris and the pilot's helmet was recovered. Royal Navy divers made efforts to find and recover the body but, although the wreck of K7 was found, they called off the search, after two weeks, without locating his body. Campbell's body was finally located in 2001.

Campbell's last words, during a 31-second transmission, on his final run were, via radio intercom:

Full nose up ... Pitching a bit down here ... coming through our own wash ... er getting straightened up now on track ... rather closer to Peel Island ... and we're tramping like mad ... and er ... FULL POWER ... er tramping like hell OVER. I can't see much and the water's very bad indeed ... I'm galloping over the top ... and she's giving a hell of a bloody row in here ... I can't see anything ... I've got the bows out ... I'm going ... U-hh ...

The cause of the crash has been variously attributed to several possible causes (or a combination of these causes):

- Campbell did not wait to refuel after doing a first run of 297.6 mph (478.9 km/h) and hence the boat was lighter and travelled through the wash caused by his first run, a wash made much worse by the use of the water brake. These factors have since been found to be not particularly important: The water brake was used well to the south of the measured distance, and only from approx. 200 mph (320 km/h). The area in the centre of the course where Bluebird was travelling at peak speed on her return run was flat calm, and not disturbed by the wash from the first run, which had not had time to be reflected back on the course. Campbell knew this and, as discussed previously, adopted his well-practised, "quick turn-around" strategy.
- Bluebird may have exceeded its aerodynamic static stability limit, complicated by the additional destabilising influences of loss of engine thrust. There is also evidence to point to the fact that K7's dynamic stability limit had been exceeded. The cause(s) of the engine flame-out cannot be established unequivocally. It could have been due to fuel starvation, damage to some ancillary structural element associated with engine function (following the worst bouncing episode), disturbance of the airstream into the intakes during the pitching episodes, or indeed a combination of all three. Further evidence of lost engine thrust may be seen in both cinematographic and still film recordings of the latter part of the run – as Bluebird left the water, jet exhaust from a functioning engine would have severely disturbed the water surface; no such disturbance or accompanying spray is evident. Also, close examination of such records show no evidence to the effect that the water brake was deployed.
- Analysis of film footage suggests that Bluebird may have hit a duck during test runs, which may have affected the aerodynamic shape of the boat, making it harder to control at extreme speeds.

On 28 January 1967, Campbell was posthumously awarded the Queen's Commendation for Brave Conduct "for courage and determination in attacking the world water speed record."

== Recovery of Bluebird K7 and Campbell's body ==
From 1996 to 2001, Bill Smith, an underwater surveyor and amateur diver, rediscovered the crash site and as a result of discussions with Gina Campbell, the daughter of Donald Campbell, and the wider Campbell family, a decision was taken to raise K7 to the surface. The wreckage of Campbell's craft was recovered by a diving team led by Bill Smith in association with Gilgeous Diving Services (GDS Extreme Engineering, Liverpool). Lifting K7 was run with GDS Extreme Engineering under Smith's team's lead. The main section/hull first raised in March 2001 and later in May 2001, when Campbell's body was recovered. The largest section, comprising approximately two-thirds of the centre hull, was raised on 8 March 2001. The project began when Smith was inspired to look for the wreck after hearing the Marillion song "Out of This World" (from the album Afraid of Sunlight), which was written about Campbell and Bluebird.

The remains of Campbell's body were located just over two months later and recovered from the lake on 28 May 2001, still wearing his blue nylon overalls. On the night before his death, while playing cards he had drawn the queen and the ace of spades. Reflecting upon the fact that Mary, Queen of Scots had drawn the same two cards the night before she was beheaded, he told his mechanics, who were playing cards with him, that he had a fearful premonition that he was going to "get the chop". It was not possible to determine the cause of Campbell's death, though a consultant engineer giving evidence to the inquest said that the force of the impact could have caused him to be decapitated.

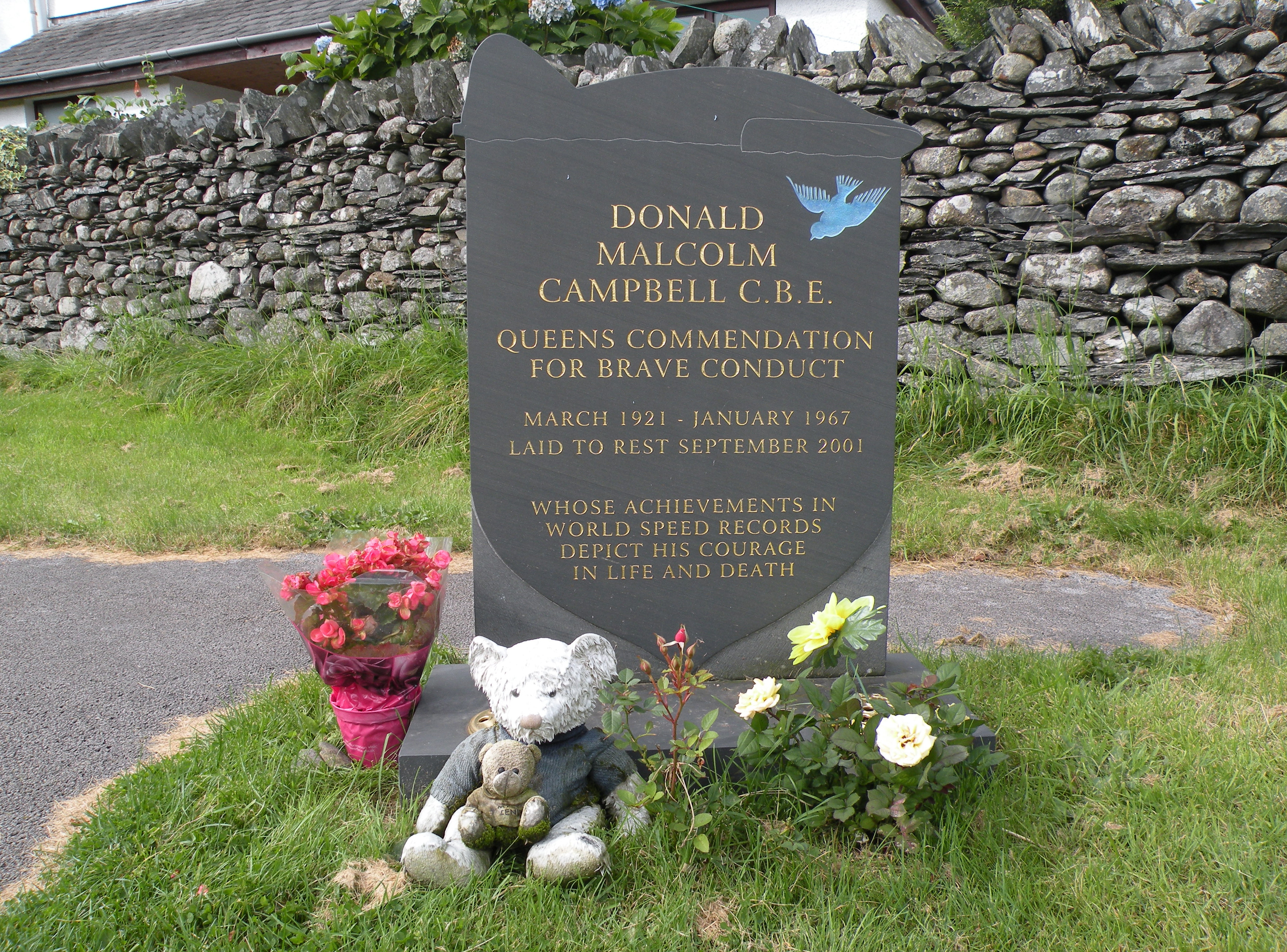
Campbell's gravestone in Coniston

Campbell was buried in Coniston Cemetery on 12 September 2001 after his coffin was carried down the lake, and through the measured kilometre, on a launch, one last time. A funeral service was then held at St Andrew's Church in Coniston, after an earlier, and positive DNA examination had been carried out. The funeral was attended by his widow, Tonia, daughter Gina, other members of his family, members of his former team and admirers. The funeral was overshadowed in the media by coverage of the 9/11 attacks in the United States.

Campbell's sister, Jean Wales, had been against the recovery of her brother's body out of respect for his stated wish that, in the event of something going wrong, "Skipper and boat stay together." Wales did not attend Campbell's burial service at Coniston Cemetery.

Steve Hogarth, lead singer for Marillion, was present at the funeral and performed the song "Out of This World" solo.

== Inquest ==
The inquest into Donald Campbell's death was held on 25 October 2002 more than thirty-five years after Bluebird K7's fatal crash. Held at John Ruskin School in Coniston, the inquest was heard before Ian Smith HM Senior Coroner for South and East Cumbria.

Initially, Julian Happian Smith, an expert in crash dynamics, had suggested that Campbell had caused the accident by easing off the throttle, using the words: "I'm drawing back", words that Gina Campbell was adamant her father never said. The suggestion had originated as a falsehood in Arthur Knowles' book The Bluebird Years. The Coroner agreed with her, saying there was no evidence before the inquest that DMC had uttered these words.

Campbell's death had been reported to the coroner's office in 1967, and by use of a little-used procedure, a death certificate was issued on the basis of clear evidence given in the police's account of DMC's death. The file contained this record, "killed when the speedboat Bluebird, which he was piloting, crashed".

The Coroner was able to confirm that, with DNA evidence now available, the body recovered from the lakebed adjacent to K7 was indeed that of DMC: "I am satisfied beyond any doubt that the remains are that of Donald Malcolm Campbell CBE."

In addition to Gina Campbell, other key witnesses from whom the Coroner heard evidence were Julian Happian Smith, Bill Smith and Tony Foy who, jointly, had set up a display screen so that as witnesses referred to illustrations, they were visible to the courtroom.

In evidence, Bill Smith described how his diving team had recovered some loose change, a cigarette lighter inscribed with facts and figures of DMC's previous world records and a gold St Christopher, a gift from Malcolm Campbell to his son.

The Coroner then dealt with a number of theories that had been put forward to explain what happened leading up to the crash.

- K7 hit a submerged object. This was rejected by evidence from Dr Happian Smith who said that such an object would have had no effect.
- K7 ran out of fuel. Dr Happian Smith estimated that there would have been at least seventeen gallons of fuel left in the tank.
- K7 was starved of fuel due to foaming if aeration was to get into the fuel. The Coroner accepted that foaming did not occur.
- Inlet tract icing where ice forms a shield. This was rejected as it had never happened before and no evidence exists to support that theory.
- Engine mounts failure. Dr Happian Smith said that most of the mounts had failed, but not during the run.
- Three-point contact (in planing mode) was significant because it explained "tamping" or "tramping".
- DCM's instinctive reaction to take his foot off the pedal and activate the water brake came too late.
- DCM's decapitation occurred as an outcome of the forces involved, with the cockpit area taking the brunt.
- Suicide theory was dismissed by the Coroner as "There is not a shred of evidence before me today to support that theory."

The Coroner's verdict was: "Donald Campbell died as a result of an accident."

== Legacy ==
Between them, Campbell and his father had set 11 speed records on water and 10 on land.

The story of Campbell's last attempt at the water speed record on Coniston Water was told in the BBC television film Across the Lake in 1988, with Anthony Hopkins as Campbell. Nine years earlier, Robert Hardy had played Campbell's father, Sir Malcolm Campbell, in the BBC2 Playhouse television drama "Speed King"; both were written by Roger Milner and produced by Innes Lloyd. In 2003, the BBC showed a documentary reconstruction of Campbell's fateful water-speed record attempt in an episode of Days That Shook the World. It featured a mixture of modern reconstruction and original film footage. All of the original colour clips were taken from a film capturing the event, Campbell at Coniston by John Lomax, a local amateur filmmaker from Wallasey, England. Lomax's film won awards worldwide in the late 1960s for recording the final weeks of Campbell's life.

In 1956, Campbell was surprised by Eamonn Andrews for the seventh episode of the new television show This Is Your Life.

An English Heritage blue plaque commemorates Campbell and his father at Canbury School, Kingston Hill, Kingston upon Thames, where they lived.

In the village of Coniston, the Ruskin Museum has a display of Campbell memorabilia, and the Bristol Orpheus engine recovered in 2001 is also displayed. The engine's casing is mostly missing, having acted as a sacrificial anode in its time underwater, but the internals are preserved. Campbell's helmet from the ill-fated run is also on display.

Campbell's restored Bluebird K7 is on display at the Ruskin Museum in Coniston.

== World speed records established by Campbell ==
Speed	Record	Vehicle	Location	Date
202.32 mph (325.60 km/h)	Water	Bluebird K7	Ullswater	23 July 1955
216.20 mph (347.94 km/h)	Water	Bluebird K7	Lake Mead	16 November 1955
225.63 mph (363.12 km/h)	Water	Bluebird K7	Coniston Water	19 September 1956
239.07 mph (384.75 km/h)	Water	Bluebird K7	Coniston Water	7 November 1957
248.62 mph (400.12 km/h)	Water	Bluebird K7	Coniston Water	10 November 1958
260.35 mph (418.99 km/h)	Water	Bluebird K7	Coniston Water	14 May 1959
276.33 mph (444.71 km/h)	Water	Bluebird K7	Lake Dumbleyung	31 December 1964
403.10 mph (648.73 km/h)	Land	Bluebird CN7	Lake Eyre	17 July 1964
