= Oscar Gugen =

Founder of the British Sub-Aqua Club

Norbert Oscar Gugen (20 January 1910 – 19 March 1992) co-founded the British Sub-Aqua Club, "the largest and most successful diving club in the world", and the partnership E. T. Skinner & Co. Ltd., which became Typhoon International, "the world’s largest manufacturer of drysuits". Born Norbert Oscar Gugenbichler in Paris with dual Austrian and French nationality, he was naturalised British as "Manager and Secretary (Toy Manufacturers)" on 29 August 1951.

== Early life ==
Gugen was born in Paris in 1910 to an Austrian father and a French mother. He started as a hotel kitchen hand in Austria, peeling carrots. By the age of 21 he was a hotel director in the south of France. When World War II started, he joined the French Army. After the Germans broke through into France, he destroyed his papers, swam across the mouth of the Loire and boarded the last British destroyer which was evacuating British troops. As he had no papers, he was interned on the Isle of Man, and released at the end of the war. He became a swimming pool attendant, and then managed an American Army Officers' Club. After the Americans left, he became a partner of Eric Skinner, who was selling jigsaw puzzles.

== E. T. Skinner & Company Ltd ==
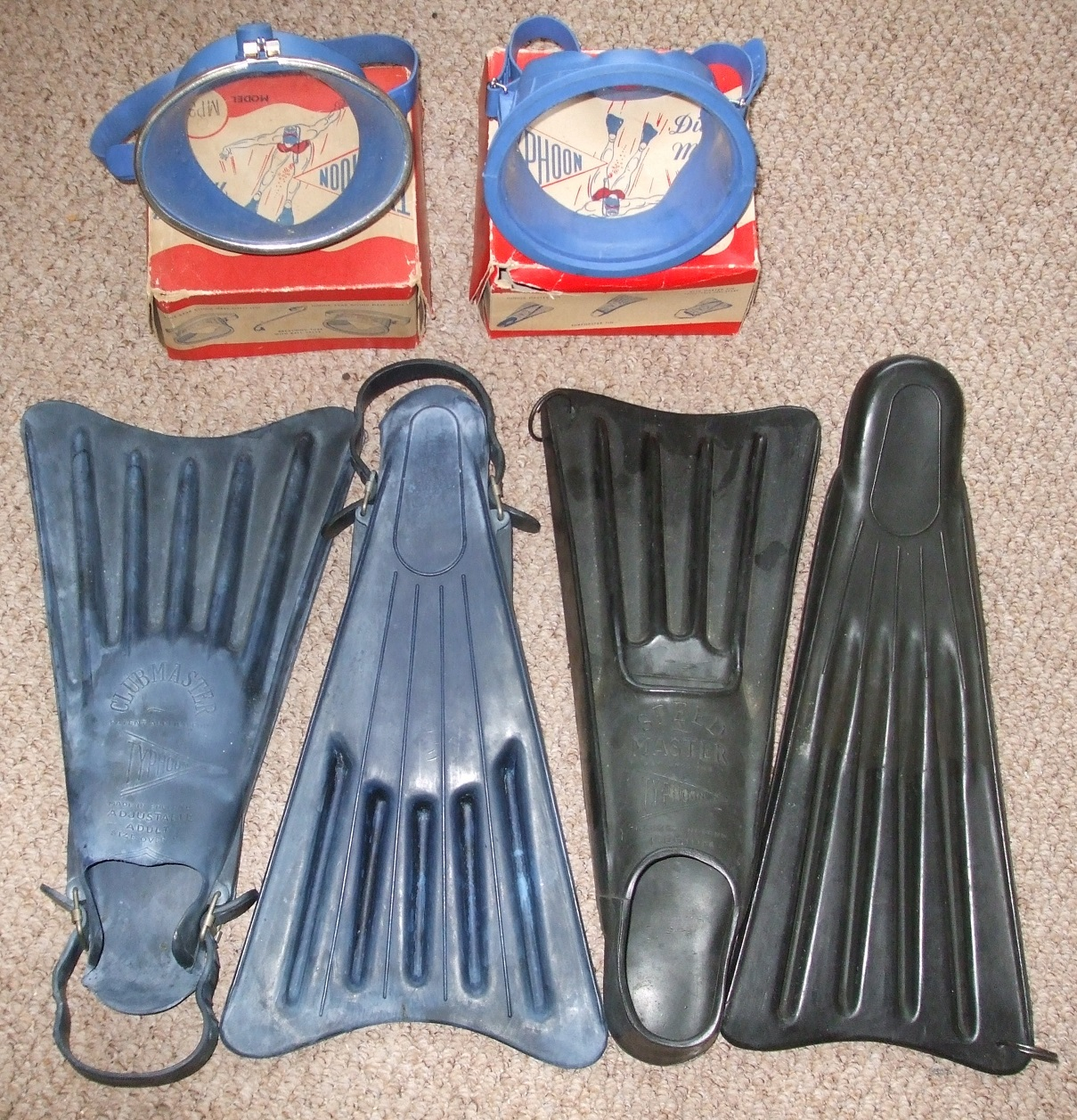
Typhoon Super Star and Blue Star diving masks; Typhoon Clubmaster and Speedmaster swimming fins

Gugen's partnership was named E. T. Skinner & Co. Ltd after Eric Skinner. The firm traced its origins back to 1948. E. T. Skinner & Co. Ltd. traded from premises at 400 Harrow Road, London W9, then from 1955 at 2 Lochaline Street, Hammersmith, London W6. Gugen used his knowledge of languages and business acumen to expand by importing swimming goggles and swimfins from France, as the Dunlop Rubber company, who had made wartime frogmen's fins, had decided that there would be no market for them in peace time. Soon he was selling 300 pairs of fins a week, mainly to Gamages and to Colin McLeod at Lillywhites.

The 1956 and 1966 editions of Skinner's handbook for skin divers served as the company's product catalogues during the 1950s and 1960s. This guide provided basic safety advice and listed the company's full range of underwater swimming products, both imported lines and its own-brand "Typhoon" articles of British design and manufacture. Both editions contained product descriptions of diving masks (the Typhoon Super Star and Blue Star diving masks pictured right appeared in both issues), breathing tubes, swimfins (the Typhoon Clubmaster swimming fins pictured right appeared in both issues, while the Typhoon Speedmaster swimming fins pictured alongside them only appeared in the 1956 edition), dry suits, wetsuits and harpoon guns. The 1966 issue also listed an underwater camera and demand valves.

== Typhoon International ==
In the 1970s, E. T. Skinner & Co. Ltd. was renamed Typhoon and a factory was built in Redcar, where the company continues to operate. Typhoon is a manufacturer of dry suits for diving and other water sport, rescue, commercial and military applications, and lifejackets and buoyancy aids.

== Patents ==
During the 1950s and 1960s, E. T. Skinner & Co. Ltd. filed several successful British patent applications:

- GB746764 (published 21 March 1956): Improvements in and relating to Swim-Fins. The patent drawings show the prototype of the Typhoon open-heel Surfmaster fin, which appears in the 1956 Skinner's handbook with the caption: "The Fluted Typhoon Swimfin is covered by British Patent No. 746764."
- GB781597 (published 21 August 1957): Improvements in or relating to Valves for Underwater Breathing Apparatus. The patent drawings show the prototype of the "Typhoon Automatic Valve Assembly" to be fitted as a snorkel tube to a diving mask and featured in the 1956 Skinner's handbook.
- GB842768 (published 27 July 1960): Improved Sealing Means for an Aperture in an Article Comprised of Flexible Sheet Material. The patent drawings show the prototype of the "Typhoon Watertight Closure" used to seal the Typhoon one-piece dry suit, which appears in the 1966 Skinner's handbook.
- GB932258 (published 24 July 1963): Improved mask for use in underwater swimming and diving. This patent protects a "cushioned face-mask flange" design providing diving mask wearers with a more comfortable fit.

== British Sub-Aqua Club ==
To form a national diving club, Gugen tried to merge with Harold Penman's Underwater Explorers Club, but the attempt failed over policy differences: Penman insisted that either he, or Gugen, should own the club and control the finances, while Gugen was adamant that it should be run by the members and their elected committee.

Gugen determined that he would need a dedicated and persuasive journalist to cover publicity and public relations. He found the journalist he wanted in Peter Small who had already expressed enormous enthusiasm for science and the sea in articles published in Picture Post, the Daily Herald, New Scientist, the Sunday Times and the News Chronicle. Like Gugen, he had used the aqualung, but only briefly. The two obtained scuba diving training from Trevor Hampton at Warfleet Creek. Gugen had two dives, while Small finished the five-lesson course. In the evenings they worked out BSAC's constitution. The "Sub-Aqua" in its name was likeliest Oscar's idea, as Penman and Hampton had used "Underwater" in their organizations' titles. Jack Atkinson, an ex-RAF flight sergeant, joined them as Training Officer; he soon after took Trevor Hampton's diving course.

Gugen retired from chairing the BSAC in 1958. In the club's magazine Triton, Peter Small paid tribute to Oscar Gugen's service as club chairman: "It is impossible to over-estimate what Oscar Gugen has accomplished for the club. He and I started it over a glass of beer, but it was mainly his inspiration (the Club, not the beer) and it was he, rather than any other single person, who has guided the Club from those humble beginnings to its present position of national, even international, authority." According to an article elsewhere in the same issue, Gugen was subsequently elected president of the BSAC London Branch, which is the original branch No.1 of the British Sub-Aqua Club.

== See also ==
History of British Sub-Aqua Club.
