= Millennium yews =

British project to celebrate the millennium

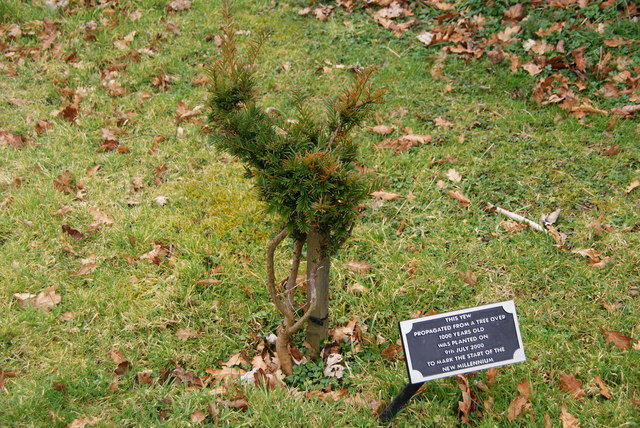
Millennium yew at Ratlinghope, Shropshire in 2009

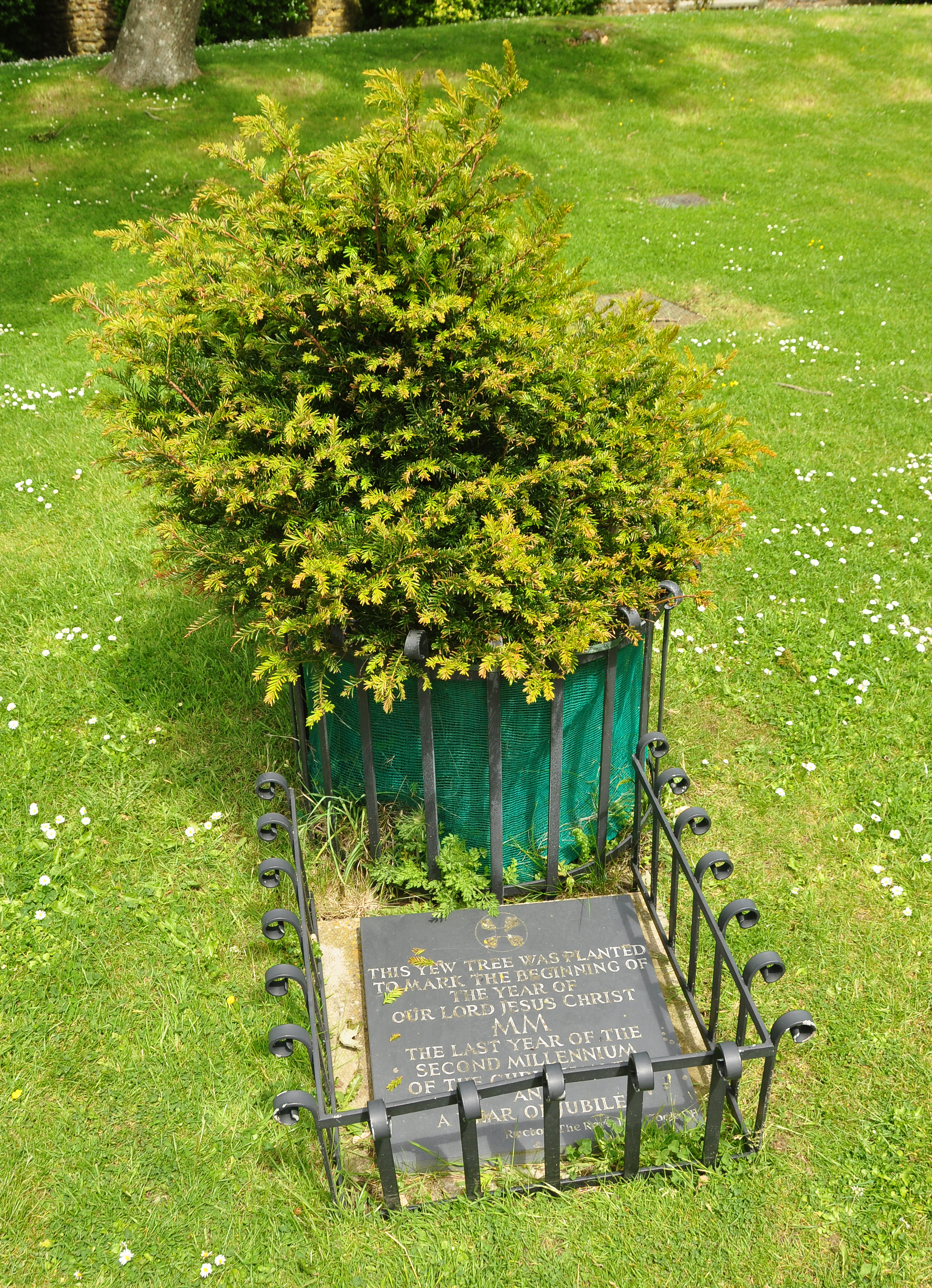
Millennium yew at Dover Castle in 2012

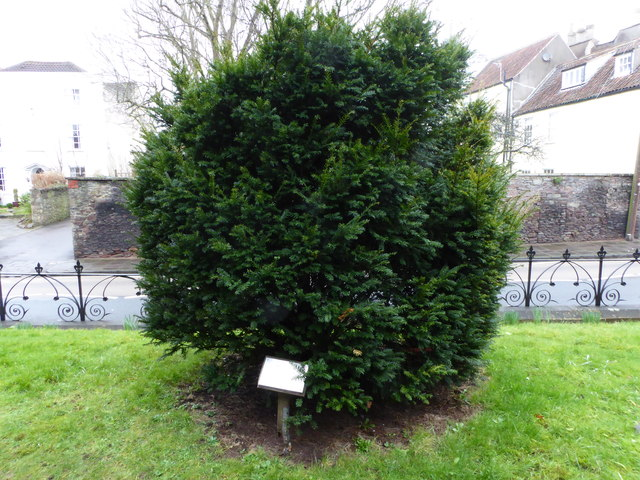
Millennium yew at the Church of Holy Trinity, Stapleton in 2018

Millennium yews were planted in 2000 as part of a joint scheme between the Church of England and the Conservation Foundation, UK to celebrate the end of the 2nd millennium. The church promised a cutting, taken from some of the yews in its churchyards that are more than 2,000 years old, to any parish that wanted one. It expected to distribute a few hundred but by the end of 2000 had distributed 8,000. The project helped raise awareness of environmental issues within the church and provided a large collection of yew trees of known provenance.

== Background ==
The millennium yew project started in November 1996 as a collaboration between the Church of England and the Conservation Foundation, UK to provide yew cuttings for parishes to plant to commemorate the end of the 2nd millennium. Yews in Britain can live for millennia and the country has the largest collection of ancient yews of any in the world. The majority of surviving yews in Britain that are more than 2,000 years old are in Church of England churchyards where they have been protected from development. The project planned to take cuttings from twenty ancient yews and provide them to any parish that wanted one. The idea being that the new cuttings would take provenance from trees that had been alive at the birth of Christ. The project was overseen by the Alliance of Religions and Conservation (ARC) as part of its "Sacred Land" project.

== Cuttings ==
The initial project was run by David Bellamy, David Shreeve and Libby Simon and it was expected that a few hundred cuttings would be needed. The uptake was much bigger than expected and the project soon expanded with a "last-minute" operation to gather the necessary cuttings. Botanist Fergus Kinmonth led a collection team that used climbers to take cuttings at high level from some sixty yews. The cuttings, around 6 inches (15 cm) in height, were packed in newspaper and transported in picnic boxes by motorcycle courier to a nursery in Bedford where they were grown on in greenhouses at Mill House Nurseries, Houghton Conquest, by Martin Day.

The young plants were distributed throughout 2000 in a series of 40 special services held across the country, many in cathedrals. Graham Preskett composed "The Yew Tree Hymn" for the occasion and the supermarket Waitrose provided specially designed carrier bags to transport the cuttings. The Royal Mail issued a commemorative stamp to celebrate the project, as part of its 2000 "Tree and Leaf" series. During one service at St Paul's Cathedral some 136 yew cuttings were distributed at a ceremony attended by 1,000 people. Costs prohibited the sending of a lorry to Truro so private cars were used instead to transport smaller cuttings. One bishop said "This has been amazing—so many people who would not normally have come to a service in my cathedral—but they have come for a tree".

As a result of the project some 8,000 yews were planted in 7,000 Church of England parishes. Those planted included trees at Lambeth Palace, home of the Archbishop of Canterbury, and the National Memorial Arboretum. Often dignitaries were invited to ceremonially plant the trees and these included bishops, vicars, celebrities and members of the Royal Family.

== Impact ==
Shreeve said in 1996 that the tree would become "symbols of community and signs of creation". Some of the trees flourished, by 2019 at least one was 20 feet (6.1 m) in height. Others fared worse, one of those distributed in the St Paul's service was planted at St George's church, Malaga but died in the drier Spanish climate. ARC estimated that one in twenty of the trees will survive into the fourth millennium. The yews provide a significant collection of trees of known provenance, which will be valuable in research in future years.

ARC describes the project as one of the most successful to come out of the British millennium celebrations. Shreeve states that it helped to raise awareness of environmental projects in the church and led to the creation of more environmental officers in diocese teams. A survey was launched in 2019 for parishes to record the condition of their yew trees as part of the 20th anniversary of the project.
