= Warfleet =

Warfleet can mean:

- A fleet of naval craft
- Warfleet Creek in Devon in England
