= Trevor Hampton =

British underwater diver

(Captain) Trevor Hampton AFC (28 November 1912 – 21 February 2002) was one of the United Kingdom's first scuba divers and helped to develop sport diving in the UK.

== Early years ==
Trevor Arthur Hampton was born in Birmingham on 28 November 1912. He was an apprentice at the Austin Motor Company and raced motorcycles on the Isle of Man. He was an avid fan of boating and sailing and at the age of 23 bought a 27-foot (8.2 m) yacht but had to give it up because his wife was chronically seasick. He joined the RAF before the Second World War becoming a pilot on a Wellington bomber. He later became a senior test pilot, raised to the rank of flight lieutenant and received the Air Force Cross. While in the RAF at Lossiemouth in Scotland he started diving, making a crude open-circuit scuba set from a gas mask and ex-RAF aircrew oxygen cylinders.

== Post war ==
After World War II he bought a boat took up sailing again but had to give it up because of a knee injury. He set up business as a marine surveyor and yacht broker at Warfleet Creek in Dartmouth, Devon in England. He read Jacques Cousteau's book The Silent World and bought a Cousteau-type aqualung from Siebe Gorman, which had just started making them. He then took several courses on diving.

In 1948 his first book, "Alone at Sea". about his solo sail to Spain, was privately printed.

== British Underwater Centre ==
In 1953 a young man asked him for aqualung training, and he took £5 for a 3-day training course. This proved to be his next career and as a result, he started the British Underwater Centre, where he trained many people and some of the first members of the British Sub-Aqua Club (BSAC) in aqualung, oxygen rebreather diving and standard diving dress diving. Over the years he trained around 3000 people.

For much of the time, up until the 1960s he used a Siebe Gorman Mark IV Amphibian oxygen rebreather to train divers with in oxygen diving, until in the 1960s he sold it to one of his diving trainees. After that he bought a Cressi-Sub sport diving oxygen rebreather from Italy, but after a year its breathing bag perished, and he replaced it with a Siebe Gorman British naval type breathing bag, which was still as good at 2005. After he sold that to a diving trainee, he used emergency escape rebreathers which he had adapted to give a longer dive duration.

He did various commercial diving jobs down the years, including on building the Avon Dam and the Brixham Breakwater.

At the Brixham Breakwater job he had a narrow escape: He found a small hollow under the breakwater and moved some bags of cement in to fill it. When he tried to swim out again he found that bags of cement carelessly slung from above had blocked his exit. He had to fight his way out with air running low.

He described an incident when a team of trained British naval divers searched for an object lost underwater and did not find it; they then let Captain Hampton have a look, and at once he found it directly under the naval divers' boat, at the center (which had been a blind spot) of their circular search pattern.

He kept yachts and boats in Warfleet Creek, Dartmouth. He assumed the title Captain, although he had not been in the Royal Navy or a large commercial ship, because of his many long voyages in small and middle-sized boats.

He and Johnny Morris made a BBC film "Master Diver".

In 1956 he published "The Master Diver and Underwater Sportsman".

He sold his diving school in 1976, at the age of 63, but the buyers did not have his success and it closed down.

Several times he retired and then drifted back into working.

He died aged 89 on 21 February 2002 evening by bursting of a triple aneurysm, despite emergency surgery in Torbay Hospital.

He was survived by his second wife Gwynn, son Gara, and daughter Jill, and two grandsons, Tom Hammerton and Ross Warne.

== Famous clients ==
Trevor Hampton taught these famous people (and others) to scuba dive:-

- Arthur C Clarke
- Richard Dimbleby
- David Attenborough
- Tony Soper

== Trevor Hampton and the BSAC ==
Oscar Gugen and Peter Small decided to form Britain's first diving club, and were trained to scuba dive by Travor Hampton. Afterwards in 1953 they founded the British Sub-Aqua Club (BSAC). Oscar made only two dives, but Peter and his girlfriend Sylvia Gregg successfully completed the course.

Later, disagreement developed between Trevor Hampton and the BSAC because:-

- Trevor Hampton had also encouraged Harold Penman, who was starting up the rival Underwater Explorers Club.
- The BSAC's "always dive with a buddy" policy clashed with Trevor Hampton's policy of training divers to dive alone confidently, always with a competent seaman in attendance on the surface .
