= Underwater Centre =

The name "Underwater Centre" may mean:-

- The British Underwater Centre near Dartmouth, Devon (now closed down)
- Bovisand Underwater Centre Ltd: was at Fort Bovisand (now closed down)
