= British Sub-Aqua Club =

UK governing body of recreational diving

- Abbreviation: BSAC
- Formation: 15 October 1953; 73 years ago
- Type: NGO
- Legal status: Limited Guarantee Company incorporated in England
- Purpose: Recreational diving services, training and advocacy National governing body
- Headquarters: Telford's Quay, South Pier Road, Ellesmere Port, Cheshire CH65 4FL
- Region served: International
- Members: 23,447 (2023)
- President: The Prince of Wales
- Chair: Andrew Shenstone
- CEO: Mary Tetley
- Main organ: BSAC Council
- Affiliations: EUF
- Staff: 18 (2023)
- Website: www.bsac.com

The British Sub-Aqua Club or BSAC has been recognised since 1954 by UK Sport as the national governing body of recreational diving in the United Kingdom.

The club was founded in 1953 and at its peak in the mid-1990s had over 50,000 members declining to over 30,000 in 2009. It is a diver training organization that operates through its associated network of around 1,100 local, independent diving clubs and around 400 diving schools worldwide. The old logo featured the Roman god Neptune (Greek god Poseidon), god of the sea. The new logo, as of 2017, features a diver with the updated BSAC motto "Dive with us".

BSAC is unusual for a diver training agency in that most BSAC instructors are volunteers, giving up their spare time to train others, unlike many other agencies, in which instructors are paid employees, or self-employed.

Given that UK waters are relatively cold and have restricted visibility, BSAC training is regarded by its members as more comprehensive than some. Specifically it places emphasis on rescue training very early in the programme. BSAC also maintains links with other organisations, such as NACSAC.

Science writer and science fiction author Arthur C. Clarke was a famous member of BSAC.

The current President of BSAC is William, Prince of Wales. His father Charles III, and grandfather Prince Philip, Duke of Edinburgh also held that position and his brother Prince Harry, Duke of Sussex also trained with BSAC.

== Timeline ==
- 1953, 15 October : BSAC was founded by Oscar Gugen, Peter Small, Mary Small, and Trevor Hampton.
- 1953: Jack Atkinson, an aero engineer, was appointed as the club's first national diving officer.
- 1954: First BSAC branch formed, in London.
- 1954: Members of Southsea Sub-Aqua Club (BSAC Branch No.9), invent underwater hockey (originally called "Octopush").
- 1955, March: BSAC is accepted by the Central Council of Physical Recreation.
- 1957, January: BSAC and 14 other national diving federations create Confédération Mondiale des Activités Subaquatiques (CMAS), the world governing body for sub-aqua.
- 1959, January: Jack Atkinson, produced the BSAC Diving Manual.
- 1988: Release of the BS-AC 88 dive table
- 1990: BSAC moved its offices to Ellesmere Port, North West England.
- 1995: BSAC allows Nitrox diving and introduced Nitrox training.
- 1997, 20 May: BSAC was expelled from the Confédération Mondiale des Activités Subaquatiques (CMAS)
- 2002: The introduction of a new Diver Training Scheme (2002 to 2023).
- 2007: BSAC is the first recreational diving agency to introduce Nitrox diving as part of core training.
- 2023: Revision of the 2002 training scheme with a complete overhall of the Dive Leader course.

=== Presidents ===
- The Duke of Edinburgh (1960–1963)
- The 5th Earl Granville (1964–1966)
- The 1st Baron of Kendal (1967–1970)
- Lord Ritchie Calder (1971–1974)
- The Prince of Wales (1974–2014)
- The Duke of Cambridge / Prince of Wales (2014–present)

== Recognition ==
BSAC is the National Governing Body (NGB) for sub-aqua within the United Kingdom, a role it has held since 1954. The body is recognised by Sport England as the NGB for sub-aqua in England, and by Sport Wales as the NGB for sub-aqua in Wales.

=== Regional bodies ===
The Scottish Sub Aqua Club, formed in 1953 (the same year as BSAC) is recognised by sportscotland as the NGB for sub-aqua in Scotland.

The Northern Ireland Federation of Sub-Aqua Clubs is recognised by Sport Northern Ireland as the NGB for sub-aqua in Northern Ireland.

Sport Wales previously recognised the Welsh Association of Sub Aqua Clubs as the NGB for sub-aqua in Wales until January 2016.

=== Competitive sub-aqua ===
While forms of sub-aqua, many competitive forms of sub-aqua are not governed by BSAC, as BSAC is not a member of the Confédération Mondiale des Activités Subaquatiques (CMAS) who is the global governing body for competitive sub-aqua.

Underwater hockey in Great Britain was governed directly by BSAC with the sport being invented by one of its branches in 1954. BSAC remain the NGB until 1977 when they recognised the British Octopush Association (BOA), who formed a year prior, as the new NGB. BSAC remained a governing body for a limited number clubs who didn't switch to BOA governance. In 2013 the BOA affiliated itself to BSAC to legitimaise its safeguarding procedure. The BOA is recognised by CMAS as the NGB for underwater hockey in Great Britain.

BSAC was the first body to govern underwater rugby in the United Kingdom, though only two clubs are affiliated to the body. The British Underwater Rugby Association (BURA) is the UK's governing body affiliated with CMAS.

== Diver Training Programme ==
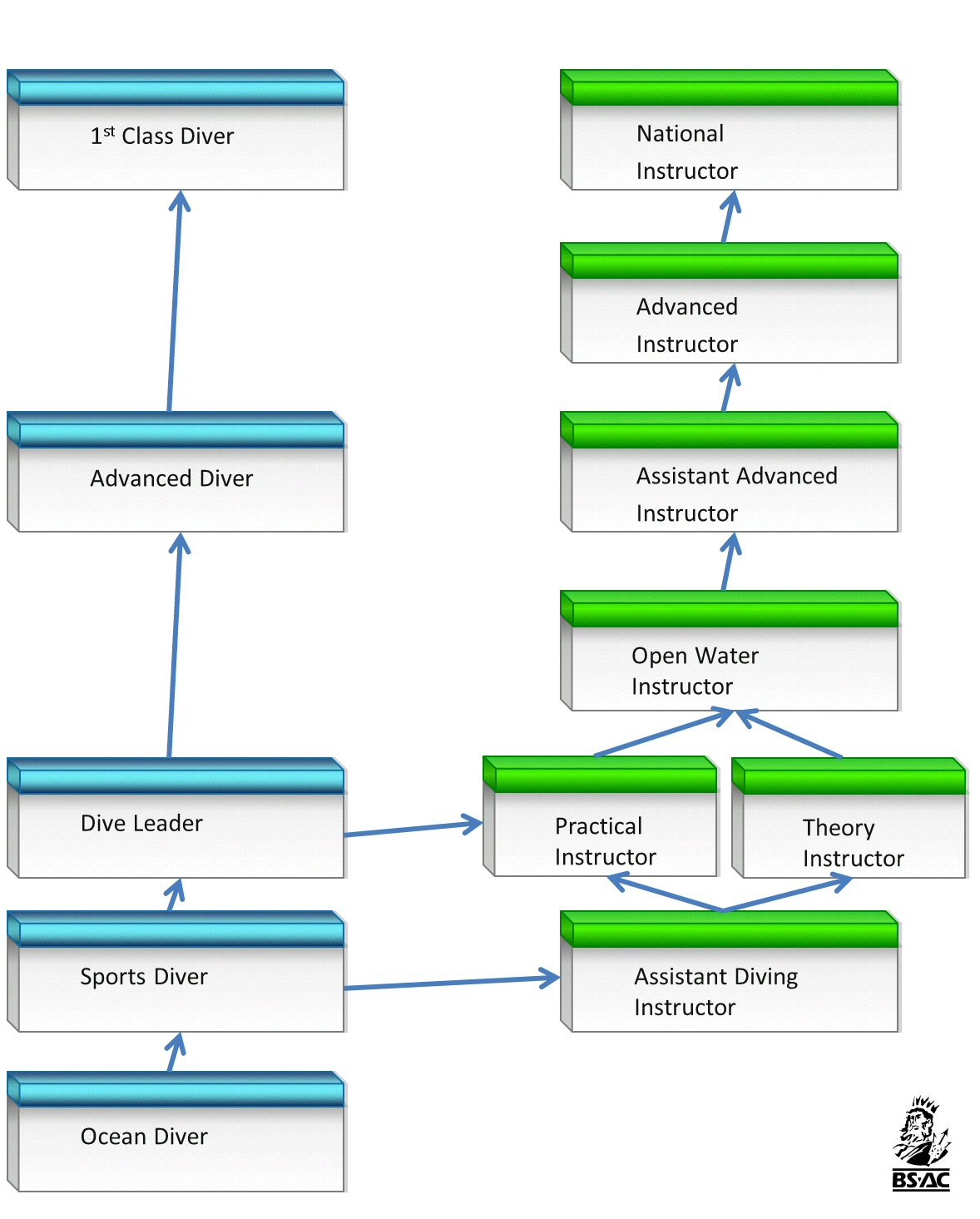
A chart explaining BSAC diving progression (c. 2011)

=== Diving Qualifications ===
BSAC currently has seven diver qualifications (five standard and two intermediary):

- Discovery Diver: Basic skills, supervised diving by a Dive Leader, nitrox diving upto 36%, depth limit 12 m. (Note: Discovery Diver is an intermediary course designed to ease people into diving at a slower pace. There is no requirement to have Discovery Diver before undertaking Ocean Diver.)
- Ocean Diver: Basic skills, autonomous diving, non-decompression diving, nitrox diving upto 36%, depth limit 20 m.
- Advanced Ocean Diver: Further basic skills, non-decompression diving, depth limit increased to 30 m with a series of 5 m progression dives. (Note: Advanced Ocean Diver is an intermediary course designed to bridge the skill gap between Ocean Diver and Sports Diver. There is no requirement to have Advanced Ocean Diver before undertaking Sports Diver. The Advanced Ocean Diver to Sports Diver course exists for those who have taken Advanced Ocean Diver to qualify them as Sports Divers without repeating skills covered in Advanced Ocean Diver not present in Ocean Diver but required for Sports Diver.)
- Sports Diver: Decompression diving, rescue, navigation, additional equipment use (reals, SMBs, DSMBs), depth limit increased to 40 m with a series of 5 m progression dives.
- Dive Leader: Dive leading, dive planning and management, and rescue management, depth limit increased to 50 m by completing a selection of experience dives.
- Advanced Diver: Fully trained diver capable of leading a group of divers in normal club activities.
- First Class Diver: Trained to lead a group of divers carrying out a project. This is nationally examined with a two-day practical test.

=== Instructor Qualifications ===
BSAC has five instructor grades:

- Assistant Instructor: Trained but unqualified. Must be supervised when instructing.
- Theory/Practical Instructor: Qualified to instruct theory/practical elements of diving unsupervised.
- Open Water Instructor: Qualified to supervise other instructors in classroom and open water training. Can sign off courses upto Dive Leader.
- Advanced Instructor: Trained to teach advanced skills, such as boat based skills and group diving techniques. Able to develop skills of other instructors. Can contribute to regional or national development. Can sign off Advanced Divers.
- National Instructor: Leads Instructor Training courses and BSAC National exams. Responsible for course development and instructor training. Can sign off Advanced Instructors and First Class Divers.

=== Progression chart ===
Diving Grades		Instructor Grades
		National Instructor
		⬆️
First Class Diver		Advanced Instructor
⬆️	↗️	⬆️
Advanced Diver		Open Water Instructor
⬆️		↗️		↖️
Dive Leader	➡️	Theory Instructor	↔️	Practical Instructor
⬆️		⬆️		⬆️
Sports Diver	➡️	Assistant Instructor
⬆️
Advanced Ocean Diver
⬆️
Ocean Diver
⬆️
Discovery Diver
⬆️
Trainee
Notes
•Italics indicates an intermediary course •Both "Assistant Instructor" and "Dive Leeder" are needed to progress to "Theory/Practical Instructor" •Both "Theory Instructor" and "Practical Instructor" are needed to progress to "Open Water Instructor"•Both "Open Water Instructor" and "Advanced Diver" are needed to progress to "Advanced Instructor"

=== CMAS equivalencies ===
The following CMAS equivalencies have been agreed with the Sub-Aqua Association.

CMAS	BSAC
CMAS 1 Star Diver	BSAC Ocean Diver
CMAS 1 Star Diver	BSAC Sports Diver
CMAS 2 Star Diver	BSAC Sports Diver with 10 logged dives
CMAS 2 Star Diver	BSAC Dive Leader
CMAS 3 Star Diver	BSAC Advanced Diver
CMAS 4 Star Diver	BSAC First Class Diver
CMAS 1 Star Instructor	BSAC Club Instructor + BSAC Advanced Diver
CMAS 2 Star Instructor	BSAC Open Water Instructor + BSAC Advanced Diver
CMAS 3 Star Instructor	BSAC Advanced Instructor + BSAC Advanced Diver

=== EUF Certification ===
BSAC obtained CEN certification from the EUF certification body in 2007 and re-certified in 2012 and 2019 for the following recreational diver grades:

- Discovery Diver – ISO 24801-1
- Ocean Diver – EN 14153-2/ISO 24801-2 – 'Autonomous Diver'
- Dive Leader – EN 14153-3/ISO 24801-3 – 'Dive Leader'
- Open Water Instructor – EN 14413-2/ISO 24802-2 – 'Instructor Level 2'
- Sports Diver – ISO 11107 – 'Nitrox diving'
- Nitrox Gas Blender – ISO 13293 – 'Level 1 Gas Blender'
- Mixed Gas Blender – ISO 13293 – 'Level 2 Gas Blender'
- Snorkelling Guide – ISO 13970 – 'Snorkelling Guide'

=== Grades no longer awarded ===
The following grades which are no longer awarded may still be encountered:

- Novice I: A diver who has completed the extensive sheltered-water (i.e. pool) training of the BSAC syllabus of the time, but has not yet dived in open water.
- Novice II: A Novice I diver who has completed two open-water assessment dives.

The distinction between Novice I and Novice II was mostly for practical reasons to do with the difference between hiring a pool and travelling to the coast. A Novice I diver would normally complete the two open-water dives as soon as possible, but if this were not possible straight away (perhaps over winter) they would at least have a specific grade within the club. The lengthy and club-oriented Novice syllabus was replaced with the Club Diver and Ocean Diver syllabuses in the late 1990s. (However, some argue the Novice description was usefully accurate and aided diver safety because nobody with such a qualification would attempt dives beyond their capabilities).

- Club Diver: This is more or less the same as Ocean Diver; originally the two were operated in parallel with Ocean Diver awarded at schools and Club Diver at clubs.
- Club Instructor: An instructor grade junior to Open Water Instructor, but allowing the holder to instruct practical and theory lessons without supervision.
- Third Class Diver: This was the entry-level grade prior to the splitting of its syllabus during the mid-1980s to create the Novice and Sports Diver grades. Divers who held this grade at the time were awarded the Sports Diver grade.
- Second Class Diver: This was the immediate grade prior to the splitting of its syllabus during the mid-1980s to create the Dive Leader and Advanced Diver grades. Divers who held this grade at the time were awarded the Advanced Diver grade.

== Snorkeller Training Programme ==
=== Snorkelling Qualifications ===
BSAC has five snorkeller grades (four standard and one intermediary):

- Dolphin Snorkeller: Swimmingpool based course designed for children containing the practical elements of Snorkel Diver without theory or practical assessments. Must be supervised when snorkelling.
- Snorkel Diver: Training for autonomous sheltered water activity. (Note: BSAC defines sheltered water as a site generally less than 4 metres deep, a minimum of 5 metres visibility, and being free from significant water movement.)
- Advanced Snorkeller: Training for autonomous open water activity. Trained in navigation and search and recovery.
- Snorkel Dive Manager: Training to plan, organise and lead snorkelling activities, in addition to snorkelling first aid and incident management.
- Snorkel Guide: Furthering skills learned on Snorkel Diver Manager in addition to defibrillator training and oxygen therapy.

Since 2015, BSAC's Dolphin Snorkeller programme has been incorporated into Swim England's Aquatic Skills Framework.

=== Instructor Qualifications ===
BSAC three snorkel instructor grades:

- Snorkel Instructor: Qualified for sheltered water instructing.
- Advanced Snorkel Instructor: Qualified for open water instructing.
- Snorkel Instructor Trainer: Qualified to train instructors.

BSAC scuba instructors can also teach all or parts of the Snorkeller Training Programme subject to meeting pre-requisites including additional training.

=== Progression chart ===
Snorkelling Grades		Instructor Grades
Snorkel Guide		Snorkel Instructor Trainer
⬆️		⬆️
Snorkel Dive Manager	➡️	Advanced Snorkel Instructor
⬆️
Advanced Snorkeller		⬆️
⬆️
Snorkel Diver	➡️	Snorkel Instructor
⬆️
Dolphin Snorkeller
⬆️
Trainee
Notes
•Italics indicates an intermediary course •Both "Snorkel Instructor" and "Snorkel Dive Manager" are needed to progress to "Advanced Snorkel Instructor"

== Skill Development Courses ==
BSAC offer range of specialist diving courses known as Skill Development Courses (SDCs). While mainly for scuba divers, a number of courses can be taken as snorkeller, and some without any dive qualifications:

Courses in brackets () indicate pre-requisites for the SDC

Club Diving:

- Accelerated Decompression Procedures (Sports Diver, Nitrox Diver, Gold Standard Buoyancy)
- Buoyancy and Trim Workshop (Ocean Diver, Minimum Standard Buoyancy)
- Compressor Operation
- Dive Planning and Management (Sports Diver)
- Marine Life Appreciation
- Mixed Gas Blender/Nitrox Gas Blender (Nitrox Diver)
- Search and Recovery (Sports Diver)
- Wreck Appreciation
- Wreck Diver (Sports Diver)
- Advanced Wreck Diver (Sports Diver, Wreck Diver)
- Twin-set Diver (Sports Diver)
- Primary Donate Workshop (Twin-set Diver)
- Drysuit Training
- Nitrox Diver
- Sidemount Diver (Sports Diver)

Safety and Rescue:

- Oxygen Administration (Basic Life Support (Note: Basic Life Support is not a diving course and can be obtained outside of driving. Sufficient Basic Life Support skills are acquired via BSAC's Sports Diver courses or higher.))
- Practical Rescue Management (Sports Diver)
- Automated External Defibrillator (Basic Life Support)
- Lifesaver Award (Ocean Diver)
- Advanced Lifesaver Award (Lifesaver Award)
- First Aid for Divers (Ocean Diver)
- Sea Survival (Note: In collaboration with the Royal National Lifeboat Institution) (Ocean Diver)
- Snorkel Lifesaver Award (Snorkel Diver)
- Advanced Lifesaver Award (Lifesaver Award)

Seamanship:

- Boat Handling
- Chartwork and Position fixing
- Diver Coxswain Assessment (Boat Handling)
- Outboard engine and Boat Maintenance

Special Interest:

- Underwater Photography (Sports Diver)
- Ice Diving (Sports Diver)
- Shore Surveyor (Note: In collaboration with SeawildingUK.)
- Beach Comber (Note: The Beach Comber course is an intermediary course designed for children. It is a reduced version of Shore Surveyor.)
- Underwater Surveyor (Snorkel Diver or Ocean Diver)

== Technical Diving Courses ==
BSAC offer a number of technical diving courses:

CCR Courses:

- Poseidon Se7en CCR Diver (40m)
- Divesoft Liberty CCR Diver (45m)
- MOD 1 AP Vision CCR Diver (40/45m)
- MOD 1 AP Mixed Gas Top-up (45m)
- MOD 2 CCR Diver (60m)
- Advanced Mixed Gas CCR Diver (80m)

Open-circuit mixed gas courses:

- Sport Mixed Gas Diver (50m)
- Explorer Mixed Gas Diver (60m)
- Advanced Mixed Gas Diver (80m)

== See also ==
=== Organizations ===
- British Octopush Association – National body for underwater hockey in the United Kingdom
- List of diver certification organizations – Agencies which issue certification for competence in diving skills
- Nautical Archaeology Society – British organisation to further research in nautical archaeology for the public benefit
- Underwater Explorers Club – British diving club, now defunct

=== People ===
- David Bellamy – English professor, botanist, author, broadcaster and environmental campaigner
- Mensun Bound – British maritime archaeologist
- William Paul Fife – US Air Force officer and hyperbaric medicine researcher
- Richard Larn – British shipwreck historian (1931–2026)
- John Rawlins (Royal Navy officer) – Royal Navy officer and pioneer in the field of diving medicine
- Margaret Rule – British archaeologist who led the Mary Rose project
- Peter Scoones – Underwater cameraman
- Sir John Wedgwood, 2nd Baronet – British politician and industrialist

=== Wrecks ===
- Mary Rose – English Tudor warship (1511–1545)
