= BSAC London Branch =

Original British Sub-Aqua Club branch

BSAC London No.1 Branch
- Abbreviation: London No.1
- Formation: 4 May 1954
- Headquarters: London, United Kingdom
- Members: 70
- President: Keith Graham
- Parent organization: British Sub-Aqua Club
- Affiliations: RNLI Tower Bridge
- Volunteers: 6
- Website: http://www.londondiver.com

The BSAC London Branch is the original branch No.1 of the British Sub-Aqua Club. The branch continues as an active, member-driven club to train and undertake scuba diving within the UK and around the world. The branch is currently located at the Queen Mother Sports Centre, Victoria, central London. The branch meets weekly from 7pm on Tuesdays and retires to a nearby pub nearby after training or playing Octopush in the swimming pool.

Divers trained by the London Branch have included Arthur C Clarke, Kenneth More, Lord Hailsham, Esther Williams, Mike Brennan, Tony Daniels, Tim Smit and Rowena Ker.

The current branch chairman is Richard Pettifer and diving officer is Tobias Hartung.

== History ==
The inaugural meeting of the branch was held on 15 October 1953 hosted by Oscar Gugen at the Waldorf Hotel, attended by some 50 enthusiasts. The BSAC London Branch became the first branch created as a result of national recognition by the Sports Council of the British Sub-Aqua Club (BSAC) in 1954, when the existing committee became the general committee of the national BSAC. By 1955 the No.1 branch had 469 members and became the pre-eminent diver training branch in London in the 1950s and 1960s with many members subsequently going on to form other branches or set up dive centres in Britain and around the world.

=== The early years ===
Early diving equipment using ex-RAF Tadpoles

In 1959 there were 503 aqualung dives, 251 snorkel, 57 oxygen and 25 helmet dives. In 1960 the branch used an air compressor at St John's Wood dairy and by 1961 there were 784 aqualung dives, 12 oxygen and 14 helmet dives.

See the Timeline of underwater technology and Scuba set for more on the development of diving technologies.

The first sea dive the branch organised was to Bognor Regis. By the late 1950s and early 1960s the club was diving regularly in the UK at Arlesey Quarry, Laughing Waters, Stoney Cove, Chesil Beach, Kimmeridge Ledges, Anglesey, Portland Harbour, Newton Ferrers, Stoke, Durdle Door, Weymouth, Salcombe and Plymouth.

The swimming and floating test in 1961 included picking weights up from the bottom of the pool and holding them up in the air. The trainee progressed to intensive snorkel lessons and tests e.g. tow an adult 50 yards, land and give artificial respiration.

Horse-collar adjustable buoyancy life jackets in use in the early 1970s

To be classified as a third class diver in 1961 the trainees had pool aqualung training, 3 open water dives and a skin diving test, 4 training periods assisting in the equipment room and 1 evening looking after the record book at the pool entrance. The qualification enabled a diver to act as bath marshal to maintain discipline during pool training, to give instruction to third class level and to become a full member of the club.

Diving at Lamorna Cove, Cornwall in 1979

The second class diver in 1961 had open water aqualung training which included 10 dives (5 in the open sea) deeper than 10m for a minimum of 15 minutes, free ascents from 30 ft and 50 ft, a 20 ft circular search, 4 sessions assisting with the compressor and a written exam set by the branch with a 2/6d entrance fee. A second class diver could act as a dive marshal and could endorse log books.

The first class qualification in 1961 was for divers between the ages of 20 and 50. They had to have 30 dives over and above those required for second class, a bronze life saving medallion and a letter of recommendation from the club committee.

The Club Med led the world in diver training in the early 1960s and was the major destination for dive holidays. Instructor qualifications were started in 1965. Before that divers could only get an "Instructor's Endorsement" between the ages of 25–50.

In 1954 the branch bought a van from the Arts Council and installed seats and lockers with a carrier underneath for 6 cylinders. The van was painted with advertisements and christened Oscar.

=== More recent times ===
In 1997 the branch obtained a National Lottery grant to upgrade its boats and facilities to ensure safe diving was maintained. The boat was designed specifically for the branch, (by David Marks and Nigel Summersby) and is capable of long range trips to the Channel Islands.

In 2003 members of the branch, Eric Murray, Nigel Summersby and Keith Graham, joined the police team in their attempt to break the record for the circumnavigation of Britain by powerboat. The Team already held the record for circumnavigation which was just under 43 hours.

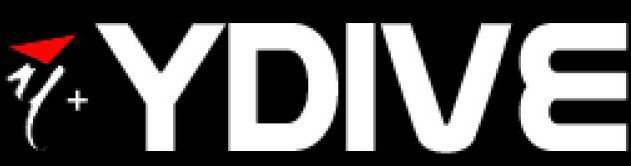
BSAC Branch 1028 YDive Logo

In 2010 the branch merged with YDive, BSAC branch No.1028, as a result of the loss of their training facilities at the London Central YMCA. YDive had been set up in 1978 as a BSAC Special Branch and was associated with The Aquatic Club between 1982 and 1986. Peter Edmund, the Bond villain in the film Octopussy was trained by YDive in 1981. The novelist Timothy Mo and the illustrator Corrine Pearlman both joined the branch in 1982 and eventually taught there for a number of years. The Jonathan Crusher Award, for the annual BSAC Branch Volunteer of the Year, was introduced in memory of Jonathan who trained and became an Advanced Instructor while at YDive before his death in 2008. Branch member Cédric Milcendeau won the award in 2011. John Greenwood also learnt to dive with YDive and later became the training officer for a number of years. He has since received BSAC Wreck Champion and Alan Broadhurst Awards for his diving activities.

== Current organisation ==
The official HQ of the branch is the Queen Mother Sports Centre in Victoria. The branch facilities include a club room complete with lots of diving kit. The branch owns a rigid-hulled inflatable boat which can take up to 12 divers and is permanently moored at Portland. The branch currently has over 70 members and meets weekly at 7pm on Tuesdays and retires to The Willow Walk nearby after training or playing octopush in the swimming pool.

In 2025 the branch trained 21 divers across a range of BSAC courses. The branch organised 12 diving trips across the year these included Scapa Flow, Farne Islands, Pembrokeshire, Egypt and many other UK sites.

== Publications ==
In 1958 the Diving Manual was published by the British Sub-Aqua Club based on the original ideas of branch member Jack Atkinson (who was the first Club Diving Officer) for the Club's training programme.

In 1959 the branch published the first magazine to cater for scuba-divers interested in the latest technology, dives and musings of the day. It was called London Diver. In 1963 three members of the branch, Brian Hesketh, Mike Busuttilli and John Cottrell, then started the first independent diving magazine in the UK, called Diver. The BSAC national magazine was called Triton for many years before being merged with Diver in March 1978 to make it commercially viable. The magazine is still published today online as divernet.com

== Television, Film and Press ==
Branch members have been involved in a number of television shows, films and publicity:

- Rowena Kerr and Jim Phoenix demonstrated underwater propulsion for British Pathe in 1958. Rowena Kerr went on to star in the film Horizons Below.
- In 1960 members of the branch supported an American celebrity of the day in underwater endurance, Jane Baldasare, as she attempted to be the first to swim the English Channel underwater. Mike recalls her inexperience and unsuitability for the task; as the attempts were abandoned, he demonstrated that she was not out of air.
- In 1962 the branch demonstrated rescue techniques in and out of water at a conference to address death due to asphyxia and drowning, organised by the British Safety Council and the BSAC.
- In 1964 the branch gave a demonstration of diving at the televised opening ceremony of the Crystal Palace Sports Centre.
- Mike Brennan and Egil Woxholt were part of the 1965 James Bond film Thunderball.
- Gill Yates featured on both BBC and ITV demonstrating diving at the London Boatshow in 1965.
- Ed Goldwyn produced a number of underwater documentaries for London Weekend Television during 1968.
- The branch demonstrated underwater salvage techniques at the London Boatshow in 1970 for the BBC, ITV and the national newspapers.
- The branch marched on Westminster on 26 February 2013 alongside Fish Fight and the Marine Conservation Society in order to maintain the pressure to protect 127 marine conservation zones.
- The branch coordinated diving in various locations (Alaska, Shetlands and Norway) on the 60th northerly parallel on the summer solstice 21 June 2013 to raise awareness for our seas and how diving can be used as a therapy for injuries.
- Members of the branch supported BSAC headquarters in the handover of the national presidency from HRH Prince of Wales to HRH Duke of Cambridge on 9 July 2014, covered the BBC, other television channels and various national newspapers. This event also received coverage as far away as Australia.

== Awards ==
The branch has been awarded the Heinke Trophy for doing the most to further the interests of its members and the BSAC on three separate occasions: 1959, 1966 and 1978.

Branch members have won a number of awards:

- Ronald Burniston won the National Open Spearfishing Championships in Bournemouth in 1961 for catching the biggest edible fish without the aid of an aqualung.
- Dr John Betts won the Sir Robert Atkins Prize from the Institute of Sports Medicine (now the British Association of Sport and Exercise Medicine) in 1993 for his medical research into thermal protection by neoprene, hazards of diving during pregnancy and cold induced pulmonary oedema. Dr John Betts was also the first BSAC Medical Officer in the 1960s and set the standards for safe diving from a medical perspective.
- Lionel Blandford won the Jacques-Yves Cousteau Award in 1994 for his work with children. He founded the National Snorkellers Club in 1974 and through his efforts ensured 50,000 children were given the opportunity to explore life underwater.
