= Bellamy's Backyard Safari =

- Starring: David Bellamy
- Country of origin: United Kingdom
- No. of episodes: 4

Production
- Running time: 30 minutes

Original release
- Network: BBC One
- Release: 9 July – 30 July 1981

Bellamy's Backyard Safari is a BBC nature documentary series presented by David Bellamy that was first transmitted in the United Kingdom on BBC One in July 1981. It featured the use of special effects to shrink Bellamy down to a size smaller than an insect and followed his adventures on a safari through a typical British garden.

Directed by Paul Kriwaczek and produced by Mike Weatherley, the four-part series from the BBC Natural History Unit included specialist natural history filming by London Scientific Films. Scenes include Bellamy on a spider web, encountering slugs and millipedes and watching the germination of seeds. A book with the same title was published in 1981 to accompany the series.

== Episodes ==
No.	Title	Original release date
1	"Down The Garden Path"	9 July 1981
2	"Through the Lawn"	16 July 1981
3	"Taking the Plunge"	23 July 1981
4	"Air Born"	30 July 1981
