= Diver rescue =

Rescue of a distressed or incapacitated diver

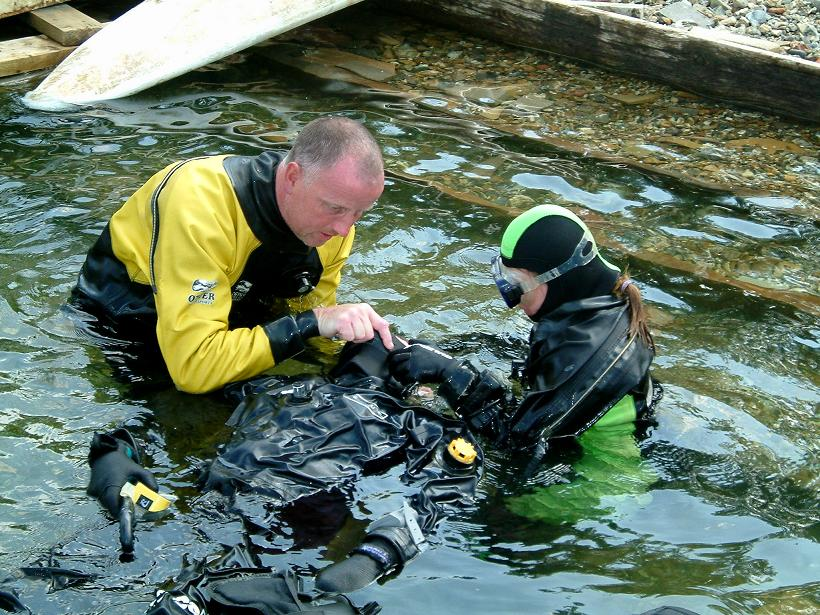
Beaching a casualty while providing artificial respiration

Diver rescue, usually following an accident, is the process of avoiding or limiting further exposure to diving hazards and bringing a diver to a place of safety. A safe place generally means a place where the diver cannot drown, such as a boat or dry land, where first aid can be administered and from which professional medical treatment can be sought. In the context of surface supplied diving, the place of safety for a diver with a decompression obligation is often the diving bell.

Rescue may be needed for various reasons where the diver becomes unable to manage an emergency, and there are several stages to a rescue, starting with recognising that a rescue is needed. In some cases the dive buddy identifies the need by personal observation, but in the more general case identification of the need is followed by locating the casualty. The most common and urgent diving emergencies involve loss of breathing gas, and the provision of emergency gas is the usual response. On other occasions the diver may be trapped and must be released by the rescuer. These first responses are usually followed by recovery of the distressed diver, who may be unconscious, to a place of safety with a secure supply of breathing gas, and following rescue, it may be necessary to evacuate the casualty to a place where further treatment is possible.

Recommended procedures for recovering a disabled or unresponsive scuba diver to the surface have varied over time, and to some extent depend on circumstances and the equipment in use. None are guaranteed to be successful.

In all rescue operations, the rescuer must take care of their own safety and avoid becoming another casualty. In professional diving the supervisor is responsible for initiating rescue procedures, and for ensuring the safety of the dive team. The rescue is generally carried out by the stand-by diver, and for this reason the stand-by diver must be willing and competent to perform any reasonably foreseeable rescue that may be required for a planned diving operation. A similar level of competence is desirable, but not required of recreational divers, who generally have a poorly defined duty of care to other divers, and are usually only trained in rescue and first aid as optional specialties. Nevertheless, recreational divers are usually advised by their training agencies to dive as buddy pairs so they can assist each other if one gets into difficulty.

== Reasons for needing rescue ==
There are many reasons why a diver may need rescue. These generally imply that the diver is no longer capable of managing the situation. Scenarios requiring rescue include:

- running out of breathing gas
- inability to access the breathing gas due to an equipment failure
- unconsciousness or incapacitation due to trauma, diving disorder, hypothermia, narcosis, fatigue, or other medical condition
- inability to see the depth gauge or diving computer to make a safe ascent, generally because the diving mask is lost, keeps flooding or is damaged
- panic, or inappropriate response to a problem
- becoming overwhelmed by unexpected environmental conditions
- becoming lost or trapped underwater
- inability to control buoyancy and/or inability to apply thrust sufficiently to ascend (in Scuba diving without a lifeline)
- inability to return to the shore or a boat after a dive

The diver may get into a situation requiring rescue through incompetence, unfitness or bad luck.

== Rescue activities ==
The effort and difficulty of a rescue varies widely and depends on many factors such as the nature of the problem, the underwater conditions and the type and depth of the dive site. A simple rescue could be to tow to safety a diver on the surface who is exhausted or suffering from leg cramps. A complex and high-risk rescue would be to locate, free and bring to the surface a lost diver who is trapped underwater in an enclosed space such as a shipwreck or cave with limited breathing gas supplies.

The sequence of potential activities needed in a generic rescue are:

- Recognising or identifying the need for a rescue
- if the casualty's position underwater is unknown, locate the casualty and, if possible, mark the position
- if the casualty is low on breathing gas, provide more gas
- if the casualty is trapped, free the casualty
- if the casualty is submerged, bring the casualty to the surface
- if the casualty has a decompression obligation, decompress if safely possible. The rescuer must also take into account their personal decompression requirements.
- if the casualty is not buoyant at the surface, make the casualty buoyant
- if help at the surface is available but not at hand, attract help
- if the casualty is not breathing, carry out continuous artificial respiration on the surface
- if the casualty is on the surface in the water and no help is available, tow the casualty to a boat or to land
- if the casualty is beside a boat or the shore, remove the casualty from the water
- if necessary, resuscitate, provide first aid and arrange transport to professional medical help

=== Recognition of an emergency ===
Before any attempt to perform a rescue can be made, a person or group of people who are in a position to initiate appropriate procedures must be aware of the need. This may seem an obvious requirement, but many diving fatalities occur without anyone else knowing that there is a problem, and in many others the problem is initially the loss of information regarding the current status of the diver. This is common in scuba accidents, where separation of the diving team members is often the first indication of a potential problem, and many emergencies are first recognised when a diver fails to surface at the expected time.

Scuba divers generally have no voice communication and are generally restricted to visual signalling. This is limited by line of sight and visibility, which may be poor. In some cases scuba divers may be connected by a tether, or buddy line, which allows communication by line signals, and professional scuba divers often tow a surface marker buoy, which may be used to transmit a very limited range of signals to surface personnel, mainly location of the diver, and if the diver needs help.

Surface supplied divers are less likely to get lost, as they are initially connected to the surface team by at least an airline, and usually also a lifeline which may be used by the line-attendant to communicate with the diver using line signals. Most 21st century surface supplied divers also have voice communication with the surface team, and this allows constant monitoring of the diver's condition by listening to the breathing sounds. Surface supplied divers are therefore able to indicate distress and need for assistance promptly and effectively in almost all cases, and the simple failure to respond appropriately to communications from the surface is also an effective indication of a problem.

=== Locating the casualty underwater ===
It may be difficult to locate the diver underwater where dives take place in low visibility conditions, in currents or in enclosed spaces such as caves and shipwrecks or where the diver uses breathing equipment which releases few bubbles, such as a rebreather. Even when open circuit equipment is used it may be difficult to see the bubbles due to surface conditions of wind, waves and spray, fog, or darkness.

Surface supplied divers are usually easy to find, as they are at the far end of the umbilical, and it is extremely rare for the umbilical to be completely severed. The standard procedure for rescue of a surface supplied diver is for the standby diver to follow the umbilical to the diver, reporting back frequently to the supervisor on progress.

Divers often use guidelines, surface marker buoys, diving shots, lightsticks and strobe lights to indicate their position to their surface support team. A standard precaution when entering enclosed spaces is to use a guideline to mark the exit route, which may be needed after the diver's fins, wash, and bubbles dislodge silt and loose overhead materials such as rust which can reduce underwater visibility to near zero.

Common search techniques such as the circular search or jackstay search, need preparation and practice if they are to be used effectively and safely. The spiral box search and compass grid search require less preparation, but probably greater skill, and may be rendered ineffective by currents.

Searches of enclosed spaces expose the rescuer to danger. The rescuers may need training and experience in cave diving, ice diving or wreck diving to minimise the risks of that type of rescue.

=== Providing emergency gas ===
Providing emergency gas to a diver who has run out is the highest priority after finding the diver. Without breathing gas the diver will die in minutes. Running out of gas is a major contributor to diving accidents. Many scuba accidents start in some other way and culminate in running out of gas.

The main reasons for running out of scuba gas are:

- failing to monitor consumption of the gas - not watching the contents pressure gauge
- underestimating the amount of gas needed for the return and ascent and decompression stops
- consuming gas faster than estimated by going too deep, over-exercising or psychological stress
- delayed exit or ascent due to other problems, such as getting lost or entrapped
- equipment failure, such as a regulator freeze or blown o-ring, in the breathing apparatus leading to loss of gas.

Even when the prime cause of an underwater emergency is not running out of gas, lack of gas can easily become another problem for the rescuers to overcome because more gas is consumed during the accident and its aftermath. This could be due to the diver remaining at depth for longer than planned or due to increases in the diver's breathing rate, due to exertion, stress or panic.

Common configurations of diving cylinders and diving regulators used as a backup or reserve for emergencies include:

- An independent set carried by the diver;
  - a complete, backup scuba set such as a bailout cylinder, or
  - the cylinder not currently in use of an independent twin set, or
  - a cylinder not currently in use of a group of side-mounted cylinders, or
  - a separate rescue set brought down by the rescuer, or
  - a "spare air" - a small independent scuba set with integrated regulator and mouthpiece
- A potentially independent pair of twins connected by an isolation manifold and carried by the diver. If the diver can isolate them in time, the remaining gas in the uncompromised side is available.
- Sharing gas with another diver via an "octopus regulator" - a second, backup regulator or second stage on a scuba set that is in use by the buddy or rescue diver

There are two main ways of delivering breathing gas to the out-of-air scuba diver;

- provide the casualty with a separate demand valve, preferably on a long hose or hand-off cylinder, so that rescuer and casualty can breathe simultaneously, and concentrate their efforts on getting to a safer place, or
- share a single demand valve with the casualty by "buddy breathing", which is a more risky procedure, and requires constant attention to breathing and management of the demand valve by both divers. The additional task loading of buddy breathing may reduce the capacity of the divers for other activities required for safe resolution of the emergency.

The gas capacity of the cylinder is important. Divers breathing at depth consume more gas because the gas must be delivered to them at ambient pressure, and volumetric breathing gas consumption is driven by partial pressure of arterial carbon dioxide. At the end of a deep dive they will need more gas to breathe during the longer ascent to the surface and during any decompression stops.

The mixture of the breathing gas is important. Hyperoxic gases cannot be breathed safely below their maximum operating depth because of the risk of oxygen toxicity and hypoxic gas cannot be breathed safely in shallow water because the partial pressure of oxygen falls below that needed to sustain consciousness.

A surface supplied diver can provide emergency breathing gas from their pneumofathometer hose, which can be inserted under the neck seal of the helmet and turned on at the gas panel to provide an adequate but noisy free-flow supply. This is normally sufficient to ventilate the casualty for the return to the surface or bell. In some cases it may be necessary to disconnect the casualty from their umbilical, if it is irretrievably trapped. This requires a few minutes work with spanners, and will lose any voice communications that may have remained. It is possible to connect a replacement umbilical if one is available. This is not usually the case from a bell, as the umbilicals occupy too much space to carry a spare.

=== Freeing the trapped casualty ===
Divers may become trapped in fishing nets; monofilament is almost invisible underwater. Loose ropes and lines are also an entanglement hazard; normal diving equipment has many inaccessible snag points that can trap the diver, particularly when components are left to dangle, and when clips are used which can hook onto line without active intervention by the diver (known to technical divers as suicide clips).

Another entrapment risk occurs when divers try to squeeze through small gaps where they or their equipment can become wedged or caught.

Old ferrous shipwrecks can be structurally unstable; they may retain their shape but have lost their strength through corrosion and therefore have components or cargos that have high potential energy due to gravity, and may collapse without warning.

Divers routinely carry a knife, line cutter, scissors or shears to free themselves from ropes, lines and nets. Lifting bags can be used to help move heavy objects underwater, but are not carried as standard equipment by most divers.

=== Taking the casualty to a place of safety ===
The safest place may be the surface, where the supply of breathing gas is unlimited, or if the diver was diving from a bell, the diving bell. where the gas supply is relatively secure, and some first aid is possible. The procedure for retrieving the casualty to the bell is relatively straightforward. The casualty is simply carried there by the rescuer. A rescue tether may be used to aid this process as it allows the rescuer the use of both hands. Once at the bell the casualty will generally be suspended by the harness using a lifting tackle provided tor this purpose. A closed bell may be partly flooded to aid lifting the casualty through the bottom lock opening, after which it will be blown down with breathing gas to remove the water.

=== Bringing the casualty to the surface ===
If a diver is out of gas and is breathing gas supplied by the rescuer, the rescuer and casualty must remain close to one another and ascend together. Starting the ascent may be complicated by the casualty's lack of gas to inflate the buoyancy compensator to become buoyant at the start of the ascent and later, at the surface. At the start of the ascent the casualty may need to fin upwards and keep pace with the rescuer until, with the drop in ambient pressure, the gas already inside buoyancy devices such as the buoyancy compensator or diving suit, expands and provides sufficient buoyancy.

If the casualty is not capable of making an ascent, due to injury or unconsciousness, or the casualty cannot make a safe and controlled ascent, perhaps due to the loss or damage of the diving mask, the rescuer must control the casualty's ascent. This may be done by using the Controlled buoyant lift. As the casualty is totally dependent on the rescuer, it is important if the two were to separate underwater the casualty should continue to ascend to the surface in a failsafe way.

The options for making the casualty buoyant include:

- inflate the casualty's buoyancy compensator to lift off the seabed, then vent it to make a controlled ascent. If the casualty's buoyancy is maintained slightly positive and the rescuer remains slightly negative, the casualty will not sink if they must be released.
- inflate the casualty's drysuit, if one is worn, to lift off the seabed, then vent it to make a controlled ascent. A drysuit is a less secure buoyancy device than a buoyancy compensator, and more difficult to inflate if the connected hose has no pressure on it.
- drop the weights from the casualty's diving weighting system. This may result in a dangerous and rapid ascent.
- lift, by finning, the casualty into shallower water, or to a shallower depth, where gas in the casualty's buoyancy devices and diving suit will expand, then vent it to make a controlled ascent.
- It is possible to use the rescuer's buoyancy compensator to lift both divers. A technique for this is taught by some agencies, in which the rescuer holds the casualty with their legs wrapped round the torso, freeing the hands for buoyancy control. This technique does not allow the rescuer to provide upward thrust by finning, and all lift must be from buoyancy. A further problem is that if the divers are separated, the rescuer will be considerably positively buoyant, and the victim may well be negative, and sink away before the situation can be corrected.

If there is a surface marker buoy available with sufficient buoyancy, the rescuer can clip the casualty to the reel and use the reel to hoist the casualty to the surface. In this case the casualty will not sink back down if released for any reason. Not all diving reels are suitable for this application. The reel needs a ratchet and a winding knob with a good grip and sufficient leverage. Some reels seize up when wound in under too much tension. If there is a swell running, the line tension will decrease after each wave passes, at which time winding in will be easier.

If the casualty is not breathing, an urgent ascent directly to the surface is needed so that resuscitation can take place there. In this situation and if the rescuer needs to do decompression stops, the rescuer has a dilemma; take the casualty to the surface and increase the risk or severity of decompression sickness, including irreversible injuries or death, or do the stops and risk leaving the casualty to die by asphyxiation or drowning. In these circumstances the value of a surface backup team becomes obvious, as a message or pre-arranged signal to the surface can bring a standby diver down to take over the recovery of the casualty while the initial rescuer attends to his own safety, or the rescuer can send the casualty to the surface by buoyancy, while remaining at the required depth for decompression. If the rescuer chooses to stop for required decompression, the non-breathing casualty may be made positively buoyant and allowed to surface, where there is at least a possibility of assistance from bystanders or surface team members. This strategy has been successfully used in at least one incident.

Active management of the casualty's airway during the ascent is necessary only as far as avoiding or correcting any position that tends to close the airway, such as extreme flexion of the neck. Expanding gases will generally pass passively out of the airway during rescue from depth, and pulmonary barotrauma is rare. A gradual and natural outflow of expanding air during the ascent may help prevent aspiration of water into the lungs. There is no evidence that compressing the chest to promote exhalation is more effective than simply maintaining an open airway.

==== Managing a convulsing casualty ====
Convulsions due to acute oxygen toxicity may render a diver unconscious. A common symptom is convulsions similar in appearance to epileptic seizure.

===== US Navy Diving Manual Revision 6 =====
The US Navy Diving Manual Revision 6 Volume 4 section 17.11.1.4 recommends the following procedure for managing a convulsing casualty at depth. This differs significantly in some details from the procedure recommended by Dr E.D. Thalmann on the Divers Alert Network website.

- The rescuer should assume a position behind the convulsing diver.
- The casualty's weights should only be dropped if progress to the surface is significantly impeded. (Thalmann recommends releasing the weights unless the diver is wearing a dry suit, as the dry suit without weights may cause the diver to take a face down position on the surface.)
- The ascent should not be started until the convulsion subsides (Thalmann makes no recommendation to delay the ascent.)
- The rescuer should open the casualty's airway and leave the mouthpiece in their mouth. If it is not in their mouth, the rescuer should not attempt to replace it. A rebreather mouthpiece that is not in the mouth should be switched to "Surface" position, so that the loop does not flood. (Thalman makes no mention of opening the airway, possibly on the assumption that air will escape without this manoeuvre.)
- The casualty should be grasped round the chest above the breathing apparatus or between the breathing apparatus and their body. If this is difficult, the best method possible to obtain control should be used.
- A rebreather should be flushed with diluent to lower oxygen partial pressure and depth maintained until the convulsion subsides. (This step is significantly omitted by Thalmann.)
- The rescuer should make a controlled ascent to the first decompression stop, maintaining a slight pressure on the diver's chest to assist exhalation.
  - If the casualty regains control, the divers should continue the ascent with appropriate decompression. (omitted by Thalmann)
  - If the diver remains incapacitated, the rescuer should surface them at a moderate rate, establish an airway and treat for symptomatic decompression illness. (omitted by Thalmann)
- If additional buoyancy is required, the rescuer should inflate the casualty's buoyancy compensator. The rescuer should not release their own weight belt or inflate their own buoyancy.
- On reaching the surface, the casualty's life jacket should be inflated, if not already done.
- When surfaced and buoyant, the casualty's mouthpiece should be removed if still in place, and in the case of a rebreather, the dive/surface valve should be switched to "surface" setting to prevent the loop from flooding and weighing down the casualty.
- The rescuer should signal for emergency pickup. (Recreational divers may not have this option.)
- he rescuer should check whether the casualty is breathing, and start rescue ventilation if necessary.
- If an upward excursion occurred during the actual convulsion, the casualty should be transported to the nearest available chamber and be evaluated by a person competent to recognize and treat diving-related illness.

Thalmann further comments that the decision whether to ascend with a diver who is convulsing is tricky, and cites the US Navy Diving Manual again, specifically:

- If a diver convulses, the breathing apparatus should be immediately flushed with a gas of lower oxygen content, if possible. (This is only appropriate with rebreathers, full-face masks with more than one gas supply connected, or with surface supply.)
- If depth control is possible, and airway and gas supply is secure (helmet or full face mask), the diver's depth should be kept constant until the convulsion subsides.
- If an ascent takes place it should be done as slowly as possible. (To some extent this is incompatible with the need to get the victim to a place where treatment is possible.)
- If a diver surfaces unconscious because of an oxygen convulsion or to avoid drowning, the diver must be treated as if suffering from arterial gas embolism.

Thalmann further commented that a full face mask is desirable for use with high oxygen mixes, as it allows the diver to be kept at depth until the convulsion subsides, and that a diver who loses the mouthpiece must be surfaced as they will try to take a breath when the convulsion stops, and on open circuit, that as long as the diver has the mouthpiece in place and is breathing, it should be left until the diver can be removed from the water, but should be removed on the surface if rescue breathing is necessary and possible. Furthermore, the main goal while the diver is in the water is to prevent drowning, and secondarily ensure that the airway is open after the convulsion stops by keeping the neck extended.

===== 2012 UHMS recommendations =====
The Diving Committee of the Undersea and Hyperbaric Medical Society reviewed the procedures for rescuing a submerged unresponsive compressed-gas diver and published their recommendations in 2012.

- When an unresponsive diver is found the rescuer should assess the security of the airway by checking if the mouthpiece or full-face mask is in place.
- If the mouthpiece is in place, it should be retained in position. If not, it should be replaced if the divers are in an overhead environment and the casualty cannot be surfaced without delay.
- If the airway appears secure and the diver is convulsing, the rescuer should wait until the convulsions subside before surfacing the casualty.
- The rescuer must decide whether their own ascent would be unacceptably hazardous. If they decide they cannot surface immediately, they should make the casualty buoyant and let them float to the surface, where there may be some chance of rescue.
- If the rescuer decides they can surface without excessive risk, they should keep the casualty's head in a neutral position and surface the casualty in the way that is recommended by their training agency.
- once surfaced the rescuer should ensure that the casualty is buoyant and face-up.
- If immediate assisted removal from the water is possible, this should be done, and cardiopulmonary resuscitation (CPR) started if indicated.
- If immediate removal from the water is not possible, the rescuer should give two rescue breaths, then assess whether surface assistance is less than 5 minutes away.
- If surface assistance is within 5 minutes, either by waiting or by towing, the casualty should be towed or given further rescue breaths while waiting.
- If surface support is more than 5 minutes away, the rescuer should give rescue breaths foe about a minute, and the tow the casualty without further rescue breaths to the nearest surface support.
- The casualty should then be removed from the water and given CPR if indicated.

===== 2019 NATO simplified protocol =====
The Medical Panel of the NATO Underwater Diving Working Group (UDWG) examined the procedure for management of a convulsing diver using a half-mask and separate mouthpiece at depth. They considered that the guidance for this very rare situation should be simple, clear, and easy to follow. They concluded that the available evidence to support delaying surfacing until the clonic phase of oxygen toxicity convulsions dissipated was insufficient, that the probability of complete airway obstruction during a seizure was low, and that the survivability of pulmonary barotrauma was relatively high. Effective management of the airway would be necessary and difficult underwater, and it would be difficult to train divers sufficiently to reliably manage this type of event. They recommended that military divers should be recovered directly to the surface without delay, and that civilian diver training organisations should consider whether this guidance would also be suitable for their use.

=== Making the casualty buoyant on the surface ===
Once the casualty has been brought to the relative safety of the surface, it is important that the casualty does not accidentally sink again. The usual methods of making the diver positively buoyant are to:

- inflate the buoyancy compensator. This is a routine surfacing drill in some training schemes.
- inflate the drysuit, if one is being worn. The gas in a dry suit is not very secure; it can easily escape from seals and vents. Also, excess gas in the suit tends to make the legs buoyant causing the diver mobility problems.
- drop weights.

Divers who are out of air will probably not be able to inflate their buoyancy compensator or drysuit using the normal and simple technique of pressing the direct feed injection valve. If their equipment allows it, and this is almost always the case, they may be able to inflate these devices orally or use an integrated gas cylinder (if fitted).

=== Attracting help ===
At this stage in the rescue immediate help is desirable. An immediate call or signal for help may take very little time to get the attention of potential assistance. However, if this fails, the survival of the casualty should be attended to, by artificial ventilation if necessary.

Very often, the only people that can provide that help are nearby boat users and people on the shore. Unless the emergency services are very close by or the rescue is beyond the capability of the local rescuers, they will not be on the scene quick enough to be able to provide help. Often with a small group of rescuers the emergency services can only be contacted after the highest priority job of getting the casualty is out of the water has taken place.

Often the rescue can be quickened if a boat can come to the casualty rather than a rescuer having to tow the casualty to safety. Once at the surface, using many rescuers becomes feasible; they can communicate and co-operate to make the rescue more efficient.

Methods of attracting help include shouting, waving a straight arm, flag or surface marker buoy, blowing a whistle, flashing or swinging a torch/flashlight at night, or using a strobe at night. Cylinder powered, high-pressure gas whistles may be effective even over the sound of engines.

=== Carrying out artificial ventilation in the water ===
If the casualty is not breathing, it is possible to sustain respiration or even restart it by artificial ventilation (AV) at the surface of the water.

It may be difficult for the rescuer to assess breathing, but it is more likely that this would fail to indicate shallow breathing than a false positive, and as there is little risk of harm from an attempt to administer rescue breathing when it is not needed, there is no reason to not administer AV if there is any suspicion that the casualty in not breathing.

Methods of in-water AV vary depending on diver training organization:

The BSAC technique works like this:

- the casualty and rescuer are buoyant
- the rescuer is positioned at the side of the casualty's head facing the ear
- the rescuer extends the casualty's neck and closes the mouth by lifting the chin with one hand
- the rescuer pushes the casualty's far shoulder upwards with the other hand causing the head to twist towards the rescuer
- the rescuer makes a seal over the casualty's nose using the rescuer's mouth and exhales to fill the casualty's lungs
- the rescuer aims to do 10 inflations per minute if stationary, 2 inflations every 15 seconds if towing

It is not possible to provide effective cardiac compression in the water, and it is also unlikely to reliably identify cardiac arrest in the water.

=== Towing the casualty ===
If the casualty is incapacitated or exhausted, help is needed to move the casualty to safety. Towing is time-consuming and will exhaust the rescuer, especially in rough water, currents, or if the rescuer is wearing high-drag equipment such as a drysuit or carrying bulky equipment.

It may be possible to avoid a tow by using a boat to pick up the casualty and rescuer. Alternatively, ropes thrown to the rescuer can be used to pull the pair towards safety.

=== Removing the casualty from the water ===
Urgently lifting an injured or incapacitated casualty from the water is a significant problem especially where there are few rescuers, the sea is rough, the boat has high sides or the rescuers on the shore cannot get in or close to the water to help.

Ropes and webbing can be very useful, but some precautions are need:

- avoid looping the rope so that it goes round the chest, preventing breathing, or the neck, causing asphyxia.
- when near boats, keep the minimum rope in the water to prevent fouling propellers
- the minimum safe diameter is 12 mm, 1/2 inch. The rope should be doubled to increase the area of contact and reduce the lifting pressure on the casualty.

"Purbuckling" (or parbuckling) can be used to lift a casualty from the water up a vertical surface such as a high sided boat, pontoon or a jetty. For a 1.5 metre lift, a length of rope of at least 4 metres / 13 feet is needed. The casualty is brought horizontally alongside. A rescuer in the water with the casualty takes the loop of rope under the casualty and passes it back to two rescuers at the top of the vertical face. The loop of rope is positioned so that in passes outside the arms between the shoulder and elbow and around the outside of the legs between the knee and the hip. The two rescuers on land secure the end of the loop that they control by standing heavily on it with one foot. They both pull on the central part of the loop rolling the casualty up the surface taking care to co-ordinate the tension so that the casualty remains horizontal and that the rope remains in position on the casualty's arms and thighs. A rescuer should take care that the casualty's head and neck are not injured during the lift.

An alternative method of lifting the casualty using a rope is to pass the rope under an arm, around the back and under the other arm. The casualty is lifted vertically. There is a risk of spine damage by bending if the casualty is positioned with their back to the vertical surface and the rescuers pull the casualty's shoulders in board before lifting the lower end of the torso over top of the vertical surface.

Commercial divers generally wear a safety harness with lifting points, which simplifies the attachment of equipment for lifting the casualty, and if they are using a lifeline or umbilical, it would be strong enough to lift the diver out of the water.

Recreational and technical diver harnesses are generally unsuited and unsafe for lifting a casualty.

A proper spine board or rescue stretcher is far more suitable, but not often available.

=== Providing first aid ===
If the casualty is not breathing artificial respiration must be provided continuously. It is more likely to succeed if it is started promptly. If the casualty is showing no signs of circulation, chest compression is needed. See main article: cardiopulmonary resuscitation.

If the casualty has injuries the rescuers will need to provide first aid and prepare the casualty to be transported to professional medical help. See main article: first aid.

In the developed world, transporting a diving casualty to hospital or a recompression chamber may be as simple as contacting the marine emergency services, generally by using marine VHF radio, telephone or a distress signal, and arranging a lifeboat or helicopter. If a diving injury such as decompression sickness is suspected, the success of recompression therapy as well as a decrease in the number of recompression treatments required has been shown if first aid oxygen is given within four hours after surfacing. In other parts of the world and particularly in remote locations, it may be difficult to quickly arrange reliable emergency medical transport and treatment; good insurance and self-reliance are needed. In-water recompression is a high-risk alternative that may be useful in locations where the casualty would not survive the journey to the nearest recompression chamber due to its distance.

== Rescue involving a decompression obligation ==
The rescuer is primarily responsible for their own safety, and is expected to complete all personal decompression obligations. This may in some cases involve sending an unresponsive victim to the surface by making them positively buoyant while the rescuer completes their decompression.

Where a decompression chamber is available on site, it may be deemed appropriate to surface the divers and recompress following surface decompression schedules, which can be extended to a treatment schedule if symptoms of decompression sickness manifest. This decision should be made by a diving medical practitioner qualified to advise on hyperbaric treatment. Sometimes this is not practicable and the diving supervisor will make the call guided by the operations manual and relevant code of practice.

Saturation divers cannot be decompressed to surface at acceptable risk, and must remain under pressure during first aid and further medical treatment.

== Rescue of divers from a disabled bell ==
If a closed bell cannot be sealed, it cannot be safely retrieved to the surface. Recovery of saturation divers in such a case can be done by lowering another bell close to the disabled bell and transferring the divers through the water to the rescue bell, which is then sealed and recovered and locked on to the surface chamber in the normal way, after which the empty bell can be lifted by whatever means are available, for repair. A similar procedure may be used if for any reason the bell cannot be lifted.

In the case of an open bell that cannot be raised the divers will abandon the bell by a method which depends on the type of bell. A wet bell which does not have a bell umbilical is the simple case as the divers are supplied direct from the surface through individual umbilicals which pass through the bell. The divers simply pass through the bell following their umbilicals and ascend to the surface assisted by the surface tenders. Any decompression required can be done in the water, or if there is a suitable hoist, surface decompression in a chamber may be practicable. If the divers are using excursion umbilicals supplied from the bell, they may not be long enough to reach the surface, and it may be necessary for the surface standby diver to meet them in the water and switch them over to umbilicals directly supplied from the surface.

== Rescue of saturation divers ==
Rescue of saturation divers may be necessary in several possible scenarios:

- A diver working at the bottom may need to be recovered to the bell by the bellman
- The divers on a bell run may be stuck at the bottom because it is not possible to lift the bell. This is unlikely as there are usually alternative methods of lifting available.
- The divers may be unable to get the bell to seal and hold pressure at the end of the dive.
- The divers in the saturation system may be in danger from an uncontrollable hazard such as fire or imminent sinking of the platform

Any rescue of saturation divers is logistically complicated by the absolute barrier that they must remain at or very near their saturation pressure at all times until they can be decompressed according to a suitable saturation decompression schedule. This means that they must transfer from whatever environment they occupy at the time of the emergency, to a place of safety at effectively the same pressure at all stages. First aid and urgent medical treatment must also be done in the hyperbaric environment. It is not practicable to decompress from saturation outside of a hyperbaric chamber, as the decompression generally takes several days.

Rescue of a diver and recovery to the bell by the bellman is relatively straightforward, and much like the case for a wet bell. Hoisting tackle is provided to lift the casualty into the bell through the hatch, using the lifting points on the harness, and the bell can be partially flooded to assist with buoyancy. Once both divers are back in the bell, and the umbilicals stowed, the bell can be sealed and lifted while first aid is administered, and the divers transferred to the accommodation chambers for further treatment by the diving medical technician under instructions from the hyperbaric physician.

Rescue from a disabled bell usually involves another bell capable of the same depth. Divers will generally transfer between bells at or near the bottom at ambient pressure. It is possible in some circumstances to use a bell as a rescue chamber to transport divers from one saturation system to another. This may require temporary modifications to the bell, and is only possible if the mating flanges of the systems are compatible. Rescue from a saturation system in imminent danger is generally known as hyperbaric evacuation, and generally makes use of a hyperbaric lifeboat or rescue chamber to transport the divers and a hyperbaric reception facility where divers can be decompressed and treated in relative comfort.

Evacuation of a single diver who is medically stable, or a single diver with an attendant, may be possible using a hyperbaric stretcher or a small portable chamber if the duration of the trip is short, the pressure is suitable and the mating flanges are compatible.

== Precautions during the rescue ==
Rescuers should not take unacceptable risks; any rescuers who become casualties themselves may jeopardise the rescue of the original casualty particularly as many of the emergency resources available at dive site, such as rescue manpower, first aid oxygen, underwater time and gas are generally in short supply.

Conscious casualties may panic and put the rescuer's safety at risk particularly when the rescuer approaches a casualty in or under the water. It may be possible to avoid contacting a panicked casualty by throwing a rope or buoyancy aid and encouraging the casualty to help themself. If contact must be made, the rescuer should try to approach the casualty from a direction that presents least risk to the rescuer, such as from behind. Alternatively, the rescuer may need to wait until the casualty is incapacitated before approaching.

== Incident management ==
In a professional diving operation, management of any rescue or other emergency is the responsibility of the diving supervisor. In a recreational scenario, it may be the responsibility of the Instructor, dive-master or boat skipper, if professionally involved. In many recreational incidents there is no specific person responsible for the safety of others, and a rescue is often managed by the person best able to deal with the situation on site.

When the rescue involves a group of people, co-ordination is needed to make it quick and effective. This may be carried out by the skipper of the boat, if diving is taking place from a boat, or by a diver. Some training agencies offer courses to prepare divers for such as role, for example BSAC's Practical Rescue Management course.

== Equipment ==
Diver rescue may involve equipment used underwater and equipment used in the recovery of the diver from the water and subsequent first aid and transportation to a suitable medical facility.

Rescue tether
Surface supplied standby divers and bellmen may carry a short length of rope with a clip on each end to support a disabled diver from the rescuer's harness, to allow the rescuer the use of both hands during the recovery to the bell or the surface.
Oxygen administration equipment
Administration of 100% oxygen at the surface is indicated as first aid for a large range of diving related conditions, and is not, as a general rule, contraindicated for any person medically fit to dive. If the diver is conscious and breathing spontaneously without difficulty, a demand regulator supply is convenient and economical of the gas supply. A demand valve can deliver about 95% oxygenWith a well-sealed mask. Non-rebreather masks provide a constant high flow rate of oxygen, usually from 10 to 15 litres per minute, which can be manually set to just sufficient to prevent the reservoir bag from emptying on the average inhalation. For casualties who are not breathing spontaneously, or who are breathing with difficulty, Bag-valve masks and manually triggered ventilators may be used to administer positive-pressure ventilation. Effectiveness of all delivery systems depends on a good seal between the administration mask and the casualty's face. Nasal cannulas provide inspired oxygen fractions only slightly more than air, and are not of much benefit to injured divers. Air breaks are not necessary to avoid oxygen toxicity at surface pressure.
Emergency oxygen supply
Sufficient oxygen to provide two divers with 100% oxygen at 15 litres per minute for long enough to reach further supplies of oxygen is standard equipment for commercial diving operations under the Scientific and Inshore codes of Practice in South Africa.
Extrication and transportation equipment
An injured diver may need to be removed from the water in an inconvenient place, and special equipment such as a stretcher, spine board, high-angle rescue equipment or recovery slings may be required to get the casualty to a place more suitable for first aid, or to a vehicle for transportation to medical facilities.

== Emergency services ==
Coast guard and sea rescue services, ambulance and paramedic services, mountain rescue services etc. may be involved in the later stages of a diver rescue operation.

== Rescuers and training ==
In recreational diving, the urgency of the rescue and the remoteness of dive sites mean that professional rescuers rarely take part in diver rescues. Other divers at the scene become rescuers.

As the immediate in-water rescuer is often the diver's own buddy, recreational diver training agencies often teach rescue techniques in intermediate-level diver training courses; examples are the PADI Rescue Diver, the BSAC Sport Diver and the DIR Rebreather Rescue courses.

Professional divers are usually trained in diver rescue for the modes of diving they are certified in, as part of the work of a professional diver is as stand-by diver to the working diver. The level and quality of training and required skill for certification may vary depending on the jurisdiction and relevant code of practice. During professional diving operations there will usually be a competent diver on stand-by at the surface control point, or in the water with the working diver, or both. The surface stand-by diver should be ready for immediate deployment for a rescue if this is deemed necessary by the diving supervisor, who is responsible for the safety of the dive team and for managing a rescue. Appropriate equipment based on the operational hazards and risk should be available on site. The bellman is the in-water standby diver in wet and dry bell operations.

== See also ==
- List of diving hazards and precautions – Hazards associated with underwater diving
- Resuscitation – Emergency correction of acute critical physiological disorders
- First aid – Emergency first response medical treatment
- Oxygen therapy – Use of oxygen as a medical treatment
- Artificial ventilation – Assisted breathing to support life
- Diving chamber#Recompression chamber – Hyperbaric pressure vessel for human occupancy used in diving operations
- Diving cylinder – Container to supply high pressure gas for diving operations
- Diving regulator – Mechanism that controls the pressure of a breathing gas supply for diving
- Diving equipment – Equipment used to facilitate underwater diving
- Marine VHF radio – Radios operating in the very high frequency maritime mobile band
- Distress signal – Internationally recognized means for obtaining help
- Emergency position-indicating radiobeacon – Radio transmitter to locate people in distress
