= Conservation Foundation (United Kingdom) =

UK environmental charity

- Formation: 1982; 44 years ago
- Founder: David Bellamy and David Shreeve
- Type: Nonprofit Charity
- Legal status: Foundation
- Purpose: Environmental action, protection and education
- Location: Kensington, London, United Kingdom
- Region served: United Kingdom
- Services: Nature protection and revitalisation programmes
- Board Chairperson: Dorothy Harris
- Executive director: David Shreeve
- Funding: Government funding, charitable trusts and foundations, individuals, and business sponsorship
- Website: conservationfoundation.co.uk

The Conservation Foundation is a registered charity in the United Kingdom, founded on 5 March 1982 by David Bellamy and David Shreeve. Bellamy served as the president of the foundation. As of 2022, the foundation's chair is Dorothy Harris and David Shreeve is its executive director.

== History ==
The charity was founded in 1982, establishing the Ford Conservation Awards in the same year. The Ford Conservation Awards later extended beyond the UK, throughout Europe, and ended after 18 years.

The Ford Conservation Awards recognised the work of a diverse array of recipients, including leaders of local environmental efforts and local historians. In 1987, local historian Daphne Munday received the award for her book A Parish Patchwork which documented the history of Sandford, Newbuildings, and other local settlements in Mid Devon.

The 1999 Ford Conservation Awards were presented at London Zoo by Prince Philip.

In 2023, David Shreeve was awarded an MBE by King Charles III in the King's Birthday Honours, in recognition of his "service to the environment" through the foundation.

== Structure ==
The charity is governed by a board of directors and supported by a council. Based in the Royal Geographical Society in Kensington, London, the activities of the organisation primarily cover the UK, but past projects have covered countries around the world and on every continent.

== Activities ==
The foundation runs a number of projects to engage the public in environmental issues. Most are aimed at communities around the UK, whilst others target specific regions of the UK or operate internationally.

In 2000, the foundation worked with the Church of England to plant yew trees as part of the millennium yew project. Around 8,000 yews were planted in around 7,000 Church of England parishes.

In 2013, the foundation's Tool Shed project coordinated with female prisoners at HMP Edinburgh to repair and refurbish donated hand tools, which were then offered to schools and communities for free as part of a giveaway labelled the Great Garden Tool Giveaway.

In 2015, it launched a campaign to preserve and protect Britain's yew trees with the Bishop of Salisbury. The campaign, We Love Yew, aimed to educate people about the yew tree's history in Britain, and offered yew saplings to schools and communities.

== Funding ==
The charity is supported through government funding, charitable trusts and foundations, individuals, and business sponsorship through corporate social responsibility projects. It is not a membership organisation.
