= David Bellamy =

English professor, botanist, author, broadcaster and environmental campaigner

David Bellamy OBE
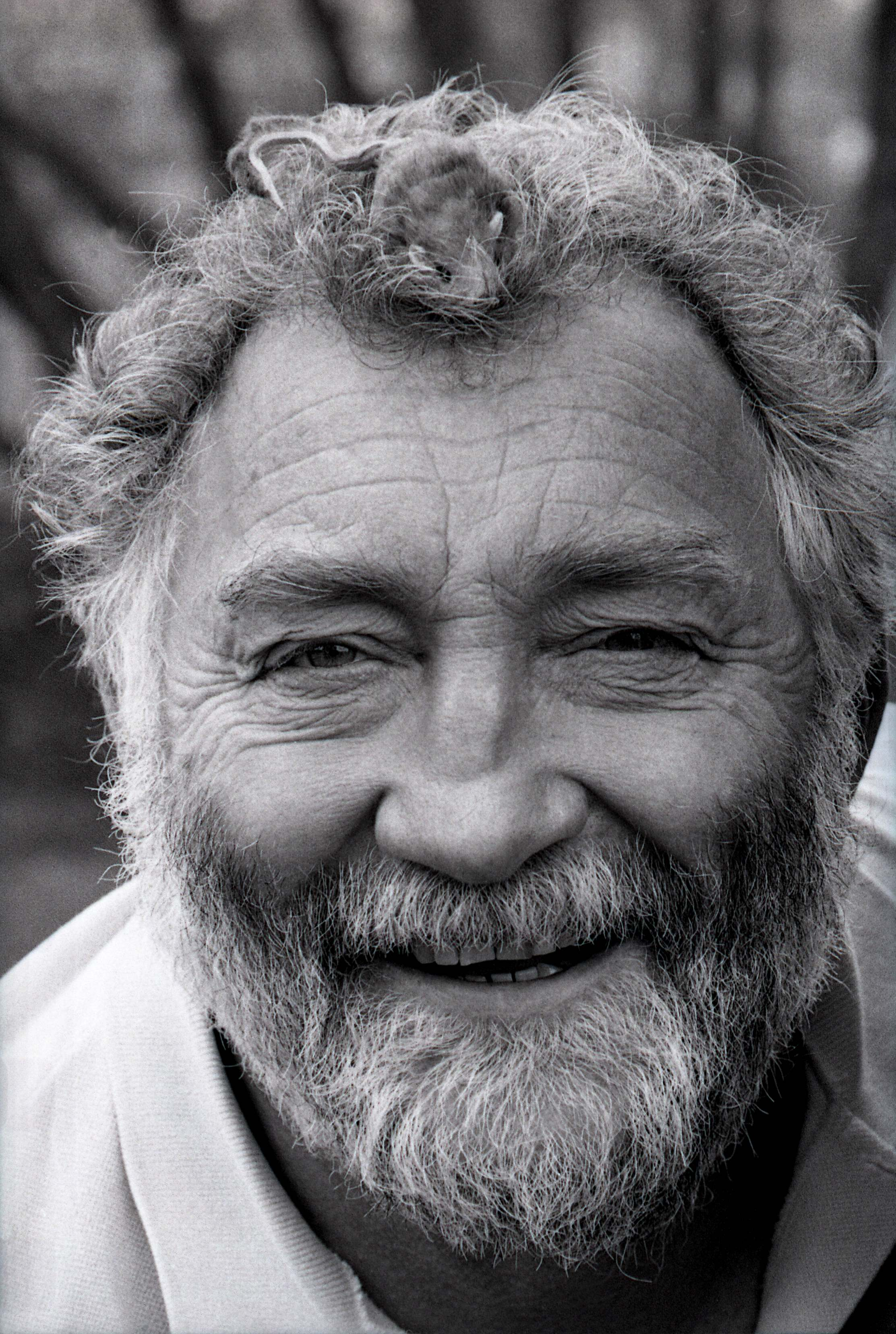
- Born: David James Bellamy; 18 January 1933; London, England
- Died: 11 December 2019 (aged 86); Barnard Castle, County Durham, England
- Education: Sutton County Grammar School, Chelsea College of Science and Technology (BSc, 1957), Bedford College, London (PhD, 1960)
- Occupations: Botanist, television presenter, author, environmental campaigner
- Employer: Durham University
- Spouse: Rosemary Froy (m. 1959; died 2018)
- Children: 5

David James Bellamy OBE (18 January 1933 – 11 December 2019) was an English academic, botanist, television presenter, author, and prominent environmental campaigner in the UK and globally. His distinctive, energetic style of presenting became well known to UK television audiences in the 1970s and 1980s. Later in life, he made sceptical statements about climate science.

== Early and personal life ==
Bellamy was born at Queen Charlotte's and Chelsea Hospital in London to parents Winifred May (née Green) and Thomas Bellamy on 18 January 1933. He was raised in a Baptist family and retained a strong Christian faith throughout his life. As a child, he had hoped to be a ballet dancer, but he concluded that his physique precluded him from pursuing the training.

Bellamy went to school in south London, attending Chatsworth Road Primary School in Cheam, Cheam Road Junior School, and Sutton County Grammar School. He said that he "was never a model pupil". He gained an honours degree in botany at Chelsea College of Science and Technology (now part of King's College London) in 1957 and a doctor of philosophy at Bedford College in 1960.

Bellamy was influenced by Gene Stratton-Porter's 1909 novel A Girl of the Limberlost and Disney's 1940 film Fantasia.

Bellamy married Rosemary Froy in 1959, and the couple remained together until her death in 2018. They had five children: Henrietta (died 2017), Eoghain, Brighid, Rufus, and Hannah. A resident of the Pennines in County Durham, Bellamy died from vascular dementia at a care home in Barnard Castle on 11 December 2019, at the age of 86.

== Scientific career ==
Bellamy's first work in a scientific environment was as a laboratory assistant at Ewell Technical College (now NESCOT) before he studied for a Bachelor of Science degree at Chelsea. In 1960 he became a lecturer in the botany department of Durham University. The work that brought him to public prominence was his environmental consultancy on the Torrey Canyon oil spill in 1967, about which he wrote a paper in Nature.

== Publishing career and related ==
Bellamy published many scientific papers and books between 1966 and 1986 (see #Bibliography). Many books were associated with the TV series on which he worked. During the 1980s, he replaced Big Chief I-Spy as the figurehead of the I-Spy range of children's books, to whom completed books were sent to get a reward. In 1980, he released a single written by Mike Croft with musical arrangement by Dave Grosse to coincide with the release of the I-Spy title I Spy Dinosaurs (about dinosaur fossils) entitled "Brontosaurus Will You Wait For Me?" (backed with "Oh Stegosaurus"). He performed it on Blue Peter wearing an orange jump suit. It reached number 88 in the charts.

== Promotional and conservation work ==
In the early 1970s, Bellamy helped to establish Durham Wildlife Trust, and remained a key player in the conservation movement in the Durham area for a number of decades.

The New Zealand Tourism Department, a government agency, became involved with the Coast to Coast adventure race in 1988 as they recognised the potential for event tourism. They organised and funded foreign journalists to come and cover the event. One of those was Bellamy, who did not just report from the event, but decided to compete. While in the country, Bellamy worked on a documentary series Moa's Ark that was released by Television New Zealand in 1990, and he was awarded the New Zealand 1990 Commemoration Medal.

Bellamy was the originator, along with David Shreeve and the Conservation Foundation (which he also founded), of the Ford European Conservation Awards.

In 2002, he was a keynote speaker on conservation issues at the Asia Pacific Ecotourism Conference.

In 2015, David Bellamy and his wife Rosemary visited Malaysia to explore its wildlife.

In 2016, he opened the Hedleyhope Fell Boardwalk, which is the main feature of Durham Wildlife Trust's Hedleyhope Fell reserve in County Durham. The project includes a 60-metre (200 foot) path from Tow Law to the Hedleyhope Fell reserve, and 150 metres (500 feet) of boardwalk made from recycled plastic bottles.

== Broadcasting career ==
After Bellamy's TV appearances concerning the Torrey Canyon disaster, his exuberant and demonstrative presentation of science topics featured on programmes such as Don't Ask Me along with other scientific personalities such as Magnus Pyke, Miriam Stoppard, and Rob Buckman. He wrote, appeared in, or presented hundreds of television programmes on botany, ecology, environmentalism, and other issues. His television series included Bellamy on Botany, Bellamy's Britain, Bellamy's Europe and Bellamy's Backyard Safari. He was regularly parodied by impersonators such as Lenny Henry on Tiswas with a "gwapple me gwapenuts" catchphrase. His distinctive voice was used in advertising.

== Activism ==
In 1983, Bellamy was imprisoned for blockading the Australian Franklin River in a protest against a proposed dam. On 18 August 1984, he leapt from the pier at St Abbs Harbour into the North Sea; in the process, he officially opened Britain's first Voluntary Marine Reserve, the St. Abbs and Eyemouth Voluntary Marine Reserve. In the late 1980s, he fronted a campaign in Jersey, Channel Islands, to save Queens Valley, the site of the lead character's cottage in Bergerac, from being turned into a reservoir because of the presence of a rare type of snail, but was unable to stop it.

In 1997, Bellamy stood unsuccessfully for the Eurosceptic Referendum Party at Huntingdon against John Major, the incumbent Conservative Prime Minister. In a 2002 interview, he said it was "probably the most stupid thing I ever did" and that he may have been banned from television as a consequence. He described himself as "a socialist, but I don't have anyone to vote for. If Wedgy Benn was 40 years younger we might still have a socialist party."

Bellamy supported fox hunting, saying that "While we have hunting, shooting and fishing interests in this country we will have better landscape management. Without these interests, Britain would have become a prairie landscape."

Bellamy was a prominent campaigner against the construction of wind farms in undeveloped areas, despite appearing very enthusiastic about wind power in the educational video Power from the Wind produced by Britain's Central Electricity Generating Board.

Bellamy was the president of the British Institute of Cleaning Science, and was a strong supporter of its plan to educate young people to care for and protect the environment. The David Bellamy Awards Programme is a competition designed to encourage schools to be aware of, and act positively towards, environmental cleanliness. Bellamy was also a patron of the British Homeopathic Association, and the UK plastic recycling charity Recoup from 1998.

== Views on global warming ==
In Bellamy's foreword to the 1989 book The Greenhouse Effect, he wrote:

The profligate demands of humankind are causing far-reaching changes to the atmosphere of planet Earth, of this there is no doubt. Earth's temperature is showing an upward swing, the so-called greenhouse effect, now a subject of international concern. The greenhouse effect may melt the glaciers and ice caps of the world, causing the sea to rise and flood many of our great cities and much of our best farmland.

Bellamy's later statements on global warming indicate that he subsequently changed his views. A letter he published on 16 April 2005 in New Scientist said that a large proportion (555 of 625) of the glaciers being observed by the World Glacier Monitoring Service were advancing, not retreating. George Monbiot of The Guardian tracked down Bellamy's original source for this information and found that it was from discredited data originally published by Fred Singer, who claimed to have obtained these figures from a 1989 article in the journal Science; however, Monbiot proved that this article had never existed. Bellamy subsequently accepted that his figures on glaciers were wrong, and announced in a letter to The Sunday Times in 2005 that he had "decided to draw back from the debate on global warming", although Bellamy jointly authored a paper with Jack Barrett in the refereed Civil Engineering journal of the Institution of Civil Engineers, entitled "Climate stability: an inconvenient proof" in May 2007.

In 2008 Bellamy signed the Manhattan Declaration, calling for the immediate halt to any tax-funded attempts to counteract climate change. He maintained a view that man-made climate change is "poppycock", insisting that climate change is part of a natural cycle.

His opinions changed the way some organisations viewed Bellamy. The Royal Society of Wildlife Trusts stated in 2005, "We are not happy with his line on climate change", and Bellamy, who had been president of the Wildlife Trusts since 1995, was succeeded by Aubrey Manning in November 2005. According to Bellamy his views on global warming resulted in the rejection of programme ideas by the BBC.

== Recognition ==
Bellamy also held these positions:

- Patron of Recoup (Recycling of Used Plastics), the national charity for plastics recycling
- Professor of Adult and Continuing Education, University of Durham
- Hon. Prof. Central Queensland University, Faculty of Engineering and Physical Systems
- Special Professor of Botany, (Geography), University of Nottingham
- Patron of the British Chelonia Group, For tortoise, terrapin and turtle care and conservation

President of:

- The Wildlife Trusts partnership (1995-2005)
- Wildlife Watch (1988-2005)
- The Wildlife Trust for Birmingham and the Black Country
- Durham Wildlife Trust
- FOSUMS - Friends Of Sunderland Museums
- The Conservation Foundation, UK
- Population Concern
- Plantlife
- WATCH
- Coral Cay Conservation
- National Association for Environmental Education
- British Naturalists' Association
- Galapagos Conservation Trust
- British Institute of Cleaning Science
- Hampstead Heath Anglers Society
- The Camping and Caravanning club
- The Young People's Trust for the Environment.

Vice president of:

- The Conservation Volunteers (TCV)
- Fauna and Flora International
- Marine Conservation Society
- Australian Marine Conservation Society
- Nature in Art Trust

Trustee, patron or honorary member of:

- Patron of National Gamekeepers' Organisation
- Living Landscape Trust
- World Land Trust (1992–2002)
- Patron of Southport Flower Show
- Patron, The Space Theatre, Dundee
- Hon Fellow Chartered Institution of Water and Environmental Management
- Chairman of the international committee for the Tourism for Tomorrow Awards.
- Patron of Butterfly World Project, St. Albans, UK
- BSES Expeditions
- Patron, Project AWARE Foundation
- Patron of Tree Appeal
- Patron of RECOrd (Local Biological Records Centre for Cheshire)
- Patron of Ted Ellis Trust

== Honours and awards ==
Bellamy was awarded an Honorary Dr. of Science, degree from Bournemouth University. He was the recipient of a number of other awards:

- He was awarded the Busk Medal by the Royal Geographical Society in 2001.
- The Dutch Order of the Golden Ark
- the U.N.E.P. Global 500 Award
- The Duke of Edinburgh's Prize (1969)
- BAFTA, Richard Dimbleby Award
- BSAC Diver of The Year Award
- BSAC Colin McLeod Award, 2001

In 2013, Professor Chris Baines gave the inaugural David Bellamy Lecture at Buckingham Palace to honour Bellamy's 80th birthday. A second David Bellamy Lecture was given by Pete Wilkinson at the Royal Geographical Society in 2014.

== Chronology of TV appearances and radio broadcasts ==
- Life in Our Sea (1970–71)
- Wildlife Spectacular (1971–72)
- Bellamy on Botany (1972)
- For Schools, Colleges: Exploring Science (1973)
- The Animal Game (1973–74)
- Don't Ask Me (1974–75)
- What on Earth...are we doing: The Urban Spaceman (1974)
- Bellamy's Britain (1974)
- For Schools, Colleges: Exploring Science: Food Technology (1974)
- For Schools, Colleges: Exploring Science: Soil (1975)
- Choices for Tomorrow (1975–76)
- This Is Your Life (1975)
- Horizon: The Sickly Sea (1975)
- The World About Us (1975)
- Bellamy – on Botany! (1975)
- It's Patently Obvious (1976)
- Bellamy's Europe (1976)
- Multi-Coloured Swap Shop (1976)
- Any Questions? (1976)
- The Book Programme (1976)
- Multi-Coloured Swap Shop (1977)
- Bellamy's Britain (1977) check
- BBC: LONDON (1977)
- Woman's Hour (1978)
- Desert Island Discs (1978)
- This Is Your Life [as the subject] (1978)
- BBC: LONDON (1979)
- It Figures (1979–1980)
- We're Going Places (1979)
- Parkinson (1979)
- Blankety Blank (1979)
- Go with Noakes (1979)
- Multi-Coloured Swap Shop (1979–1981)
- Up a Gum Tree (1979–1980)
- Pebble Mill at One (1979)
- The Countryside at Christmas (1979)
- Woman's Hour (1980)
- Through My Window (1980)
- Wildlife (1980)
- The Living World (1980)
- Any Questions? (1980)
- Ask Aspel (1981)
- Bellamy's Backyard Safari (1981)
- With Great Pleasure (1981)
- David Bellamy [C of E Children's Society charity appeal] (1981)
- For Schools, Colleges: Food, Food, Glorious Food (1981)
- Pebble Mill at One (1981–82)
- BBC: LONDON (1982–83)
- Blue Peter (1982)
- The Four Great Seasons (1982)
- Just After Four (1983)
- Wogan (1983)
- Week's Good Cause (1983)
- Countryside in Summer (1983)
- Bellamy's New World (1983)
- Rainbow Safari (1983)
- Blue Tits and Bumble Bees (1983)
- Saturday Superstore (1984–1987)
- Grange Hill (1984)
- What on Earth...? (1984)
- BBC: NORTH EAST (1984)
- Give Us A Conch (1984)
- Speak Out (1984)
- Captain Noah and His Floating Zoo (1984)
- You Can't See the Wood... (1984)
- John Dunn (1984)
- Nature (1984)
- British Social History: The Motor Car (1984)
- Starting Out (1984)
- The Lenny Henry Show (1984)
- Songs of Praise (1984)
- Week's Good Cause (1985–86)
- The Kenny Everett Show (1985)
- Soundings (1985)
- Heroes (1985)
- Bellamy's Seaside Safari (1985)
- The End of the Rainbow Show (1985)
- Q.E.D. (Round Britain Whizz) (1985)
- For Schools: Contact Spring (1986)
- The Kenny Everett Television Show (1986)
- What on Earth...? (1986–1988)
- Bellamy's Bugle (1986–1988)
- Star Memories (1986)
- Roger Royle Good Morning Sunday (1987)
- Scene: Fido, Friend or Foe? (1987)
- My Dog: My Rules – Adventures with Peanut Butter (1987)
- It's Wicked! (1987)
- With Great Pleasure (1987)
- The Natural History Programme (1987)
- Windmill (1987)
- Nature (1988)
- Woman's Hour (1988)
- The New Battle for Britain (1988)
- Umbrella (1988)
- Penguins and Plum Puddings (1988)
- It's Patently Obvious (1989)
- Philip Schofield live from Kew Gardens (part of Green Week) (1989)
- Questions: What Is a Person (1990)
- The Leading Edge (1990)
- The Media Show (1990)
- Moa's Ark (1990)
- Tomorrow's World Christmas Quiz (1990)
- Bellamy on the Heathland (1991)
- Bellamy Rides Again (1991)
- Safari UK (1991)
- Masterchef (1991)
- The Garden Party (1991)
- The Living World (1991)
- TV: Six journeys through colour (1991)
- Bruce Forsyth's Children In Need Generation Game (1991)
- The Clothes Show (1992)
- Summer Scene (1992)
- Wish You Were Here (1992)
- Teaching Today (1992)
- Blooming Bellamy (1993)
- Children in Need (1993)
- Sunday Half Hour Lights Shining in the Darkness (1993)
- The Third Age (1993)
- Family Affairs (1994)
- Bellamy's Singapore (1994)
- Will's World (1995)
- Body Counts (1995)
- Blue Peter (1995)
- Big Day Out (1995)
- Don Maclean (1996)
- Upstream with Bellamy (1996)
- Turning Points (1996)
- In Celebration (1996)
- Week's Good Cause (1997)
- On the Scouting Trail (1997)
- Christmas at the Castle (1997)
- Don Maclean (1998)
- Esther (1998)
- Water Week (1998)
- Songs of Praise (1998–99)
- Fully Booked (1998)
- Summer Disneytime (1998)
- Geoff Hamilton: a Man and His Garden (1998)
- Radio 4 Appeal (1999)
- This Is Your Life (2000)
- Time Bank – Celebrity Challenge (2000)
- Breakfast (2001)
- Kelly (2002)
- This Is Your Life (2002)
- On the Brink (2003)
- Richard & Judy (2003–04)
- Bee in Your Bonnet (2004)
- Gardeners' World (2004)
- Hell's Kitchen (2004)
- The Way We Went Wild (2004)
- The Heaven and Earth Show (2004)
- The Daily Politics (2005)
- Channel 4 News (2005)
- The Swish of the Curtain (2007)
- Tiswas Reunited (2007)
- Lenny Henry's Perfect Night In (2007)
- The Secret Life of the Motorway (2007)
- Francesco's Mediterranean Voyage (2008)
- Toy Stories (2009)
- The Funny Side of (2009)

== Bibliography ==
Bellamy wrote or contributed to at least 45 books, including:

- Bellamy on Botany (1972) ISBN 0-563-10666-2
- Peatlands (1973)
- Bellamy's Britain (1974)
- Life Giving Sea (1975)
- Green Worlds (1975)
- The World of Plants (1975)
- It's Life (1976)
- Bellamy's Europe (1976)
- Natural History of Teesdale Chapter 7 Conservation & Upper Teesdale' (1976)
- Botanic Action (1978) ISBN 978-0091341411
- Botanic Man (1978) ISBN 978-0600314578
- Half of Paradise (1978) ISBN 978-0304297542
- Forces of Life: The Botanic Man (1979) ISBN 978-0517535295
- Bellamy's Backyard Safari (1981) ISBN 978-0563164685
- The Great Seasons (with Sheila Mackie, illustrator; Hodder & Stoughton, 1981) ISBN 978-0340257203
- Il Libro Verde (BOTANIC MAN). NATURAL AMBIENTE ECOLOGIA (SEI, 1981)
- Mouse Book: A Story of Apodemus, a Long-tailed Field Mouse (1983) ISBN 978-0853622000
- Bellamy's New world: A botanical history of America (1983) ISBN 978-0563165613
- The Queen's Hidden Garden (1984) ISBN 9780715385906
- David Bellamy's I-Spy Book of Nature 1985 (1985) ISBN 978-0850378252
- Bellamy's Bugle (1986)
- Bellamy's Ireland: The Wild Boglands (1986) ISBN 978-0747002161
- Turning The Tide. Exploring The Options For Life On Earth (1987) ISBN 978-0002193689
- The Roadside (Our Changing World) (1988) ISBN 978-0356135687
- England's Last Wilderness- A Journey Through the North Pennines (1989) ISBN 9780718131579
- Wetlands: An Exploration Of The Lost Wilderness Of East Anglia (1990) ISBN 978-0283999833
- Wilderness Britain? (1990, Oxford Illustrated Press, ISBN 1-85509-225-5)
- Moa's Ark (with Brian Springett and Peter Hayden, 1990) ISBN 9780670830985
- How Green Are You? (1991) ISBN 9780517584293
- Tomorrow's Earth: A Squeaky-green Guide (1991) ISBN 9780855339401
- World Medicine: Plants, Patients and People (1992) ISBN 9780631169338
- Blooming Bellamy: Guide to the Healing Herbs of Britain (1993) ISBN 978-0563367253
- Trees: A Celebration in Photographs (Introduction) (1994) ISBN 978-0517599631
- The Bellamy Herbal (2003) ISBN 978-0712683692
- Fabric Live: Bellamy Sessions (2004)
- Jolly Green Giant (autobiography, 2002, Century, ISBN 0-7126-8359-3)
- A Natural Life (autobiography, 2002, Arrow, ISBN 0-09-941496-1)
- Conflicts in the Countryside: The New Battle for Britain (2005), Shaw & Sons, ISBN 0-7219-1670-8

=== Discovering the Countryside with David Bellamy ===
Bellamy was "consultant editor and contributor" for this series, published by Hamlyn in conjunction with the Royal Society for Nature Conservation:

- Coastal Walks (1982; ISBN 0-600-35588-8)
- Woodland Walks (1982; ISBN 0-600-35658-2)
- Waterside Walks (1983; ISBN 0-600-35636-1)
- Grassland Walks (1983; ISBN 0-600-35637-X)

=== Forewords ===
Bellamy contributed forewords or introductions to:

- It's Funny About the Trees a collection of light verse by Paul Wigmore [Autolycus Press], ISBN 0 903413 96 5 (1998)
- Hidden Nature The Startling Insights of Viktor Schauberger by Alick Bartholomew, ISBN 978-0863154324 (2003)
- Chris Packham's Back Garden Nature Reserve New Holland Publishers, Chris Packham, (2001) ISBN 1-85974-520-2
- The Cosmic Fairy Arthur Atkinson [pseudonym for Arthur Moppett] [Colin Smythe Limited Publishers], 1996, ISBN 0-86140-403-3
- British Naturalists Association Guide to Woodlands J L Cloudsley-Thompson ISBN 978-0946284160 (1985)
- While the Earth Endures Creation, Cosmology and Climate Change Philip Foster [St Matthew Publishing Ltd]. ISBN 978-1901546316 (2008)
- Marine Fish and Invertebrates of Northern Europe Frank Emil Moen & Erling Svensen [KOM Publishing]. ISBN 0-9544060-2-8 (2004)
- The Lost Australia of François Péron Colin Wallace [Nottingham Court Press], ISBN 0-906691-96-6 (1984)
- Populate and Perish?, R. Birrell, D. Hill and J. Nevill, eds., Fontana/Australian Conservation Foundation (1984), ISBN 0 00 636728 3

== See also ==
- Environmental movement
- Environmentalism
- Individual and political action on climate change

Non-profit organization positions
Preceded by New position	President of Plantlife; 1990–2005	Succeeded by Adrian Darby
Preceded by Sir David Attenborough	President of The Wildlife Trusts; 1995–2005	Succeeded by Aubrey Manning
