= Underwater Explorers Club =

British diving club, now defunct

The Underwater Explorers Club was founded in the early 1950s by businessman Harold Penman. It collapsed when Harold Penman ran out of money and many members migrated to the British Sub-Aqua Club (BSAC). The late Trevor Hampton, a British diving pioneer, had dealings with both the Underwater Explorers Club and BSAC.
