= David Shreeve =

British environmentalist

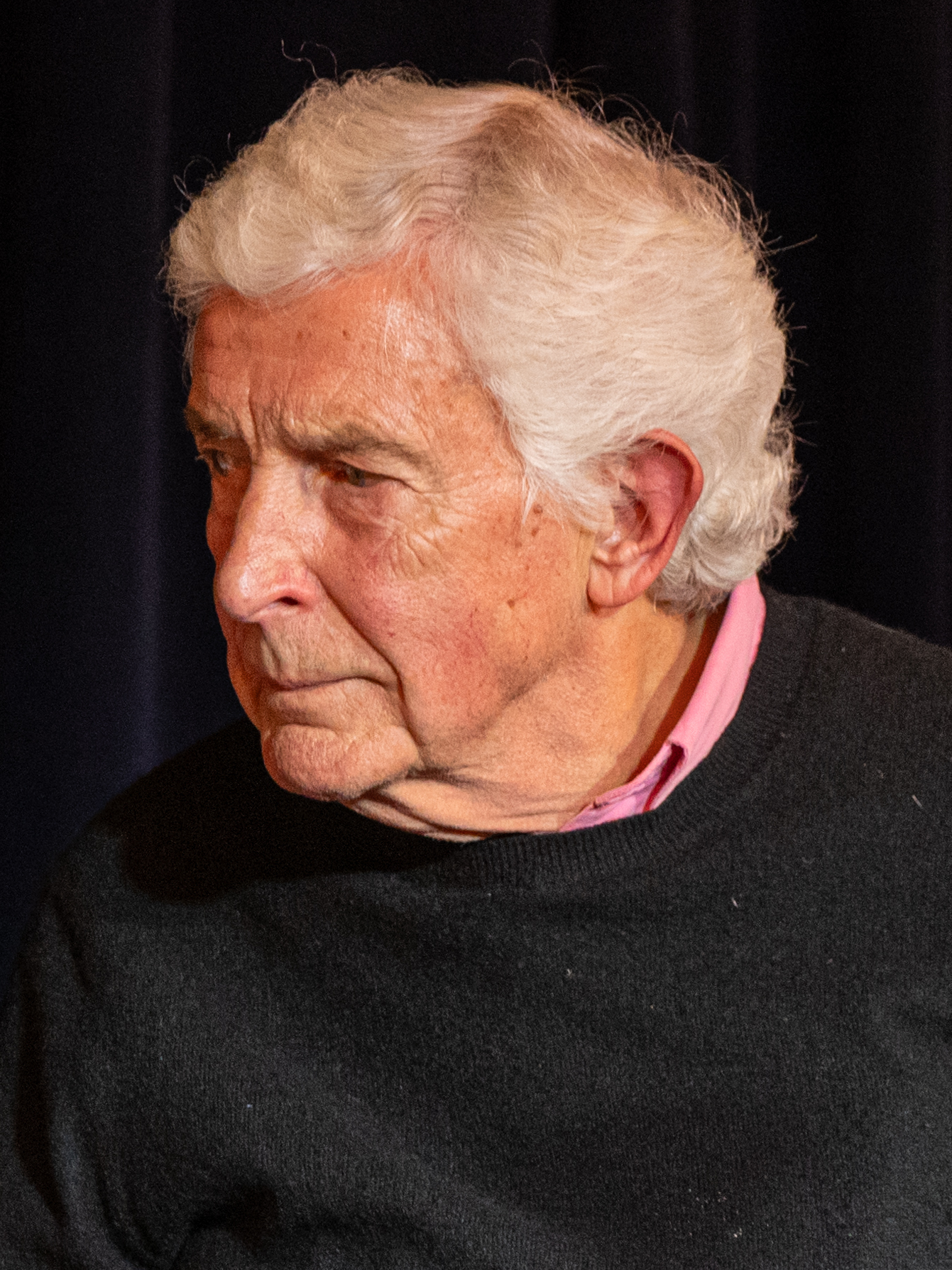
Shreeve at the 2024 Chiswick Book Festival

David Arthur Shreeve MBE is the Executive Director of the Conservation Foundation and is the Environmental Adviser to the Archbishops’ Council.

== Career ==
Shreeve worked for various PR companies before joining Carl Byoir and Associates where he created Elms Across Europe for mailing company Pitney Bowes. Over several years the elm project involved the propagation and planting of disease resistant elms developed by Prof Eugene Smalley of Wisconsin University. The first to be imported in October 1979 were planted by the then US Ambassador Kingman Brewster at the Pitney Bowes European HQ at Harlow. The following spring more were planted in Hyde Park and in the grounds of Windsor Castle by The Duke of Edinburgh.

Shreeve met David Bellamy when he planted Sapporo Autumn Gold elms at Marwell Zoo. They went on to found The Conservation Foundation at the Institute of Directors on 5 March 1982 at an event covered live by BBC TV’s Pebble Mill at One and attended by the then Minister for the Environment Michael Heseltine and representatives of environmental organisations, industry and commerce and the media. The event helped launch the Foundation’s first awards programme supported by Ford. For the first two years this was held in the UK but then it extended into Europe adding more countries for each of its eighteen years. Other sponsors have included Disney, Trusthouse Forte, National Grid, Lloyds Bank, Rio Tinto Group, Sunday Times, Tomy Toys, Ladbrokes, Wessex Water and O2. The Foundation has also received funding from Defra, TACIS and charitable trusts, foundations and individuals. Shreeve was awarded the Metropolitan Public Gardens Association's London Spade award in 2021.

Shreeve worked closely with the Church of England during the Conservation Foundation’s Yews for the Millennium project and as a result was invited to become the Environmental Adviser to the Archbishops’ Council and was awarded a Lambeth Degree for his work in helping the CofE to understand its environmental responsibilities.

He was appointed Member of the Order of the British Empire (MBE) in the 2023 Birthday Honours for services to the environment.

== Bibliography ==
- How many lightbulbs does it take to change a Christian? A Pocket Guide to Shrinking Your Ecological Footprint (2007)
- Don't Stop at the Lights: Leading Your Church Through a Changing Climate (2008)
- Sharing Eden with Natan Levy and Harfiyah Haleem (2012)
