= Brixham Breakwater =

Coastal breakwater in Devon, England

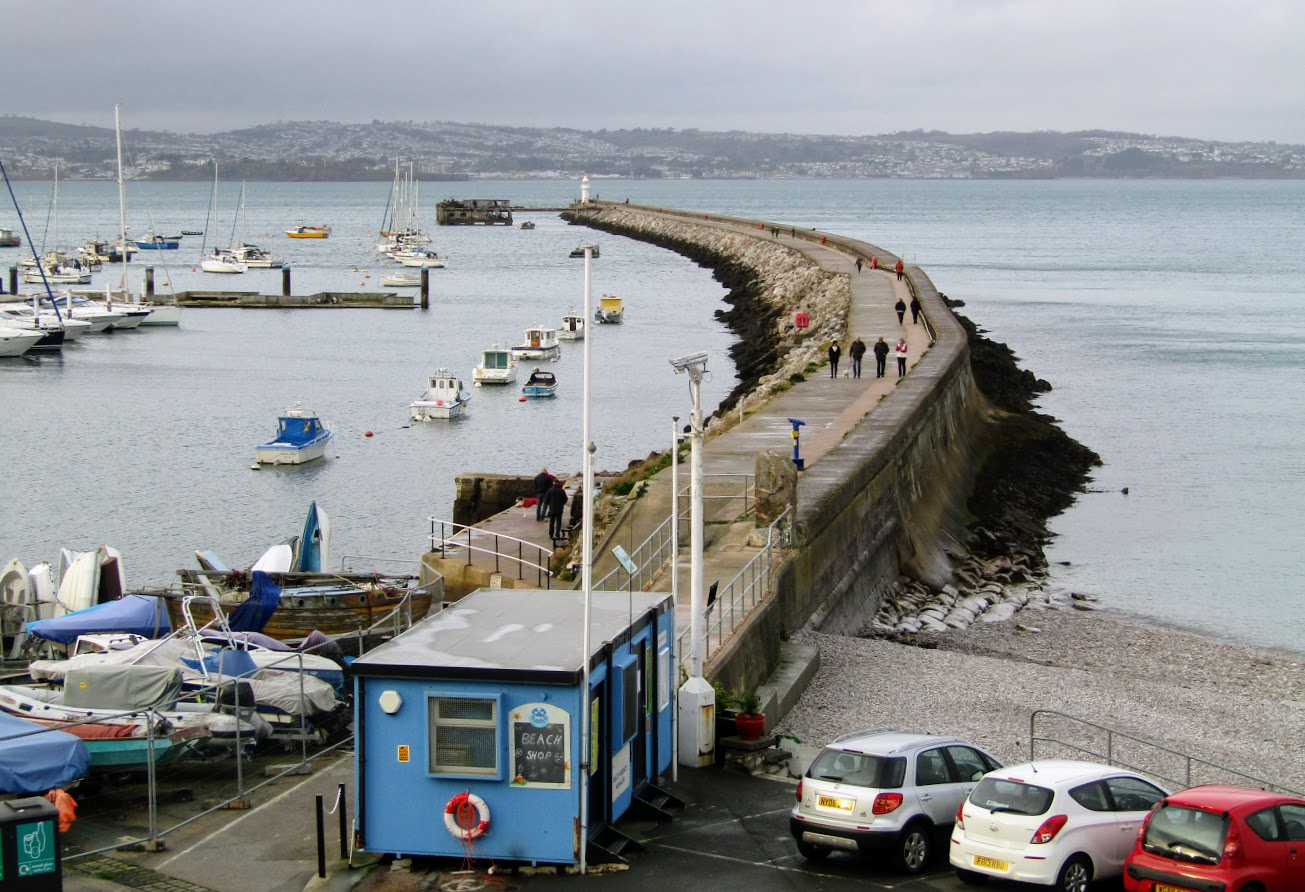
- The breakwater in 2017
- Interactive map of the Brixham Breakwater area
- Alternative names: Victoria Breakwater

General information
- Type: Coastal breakwater
- Location: Brixham, Devon, England
- Coordinates: 50.4027°N 3.5083°W

Brixham Breakwater is a coastal breakwater situated at the town of Brixham in Devon, England. The breakwater provides shelter for vessels mooring at the port, including the historic Brixham fishing fleet. The building of the structure to its final length spanned several decades, with work beginning in 1843 to the design of the local civil engineer James Meadows Rendel and being completed in 1916, when the present cast-iron lighthouse was installed at the pier end.

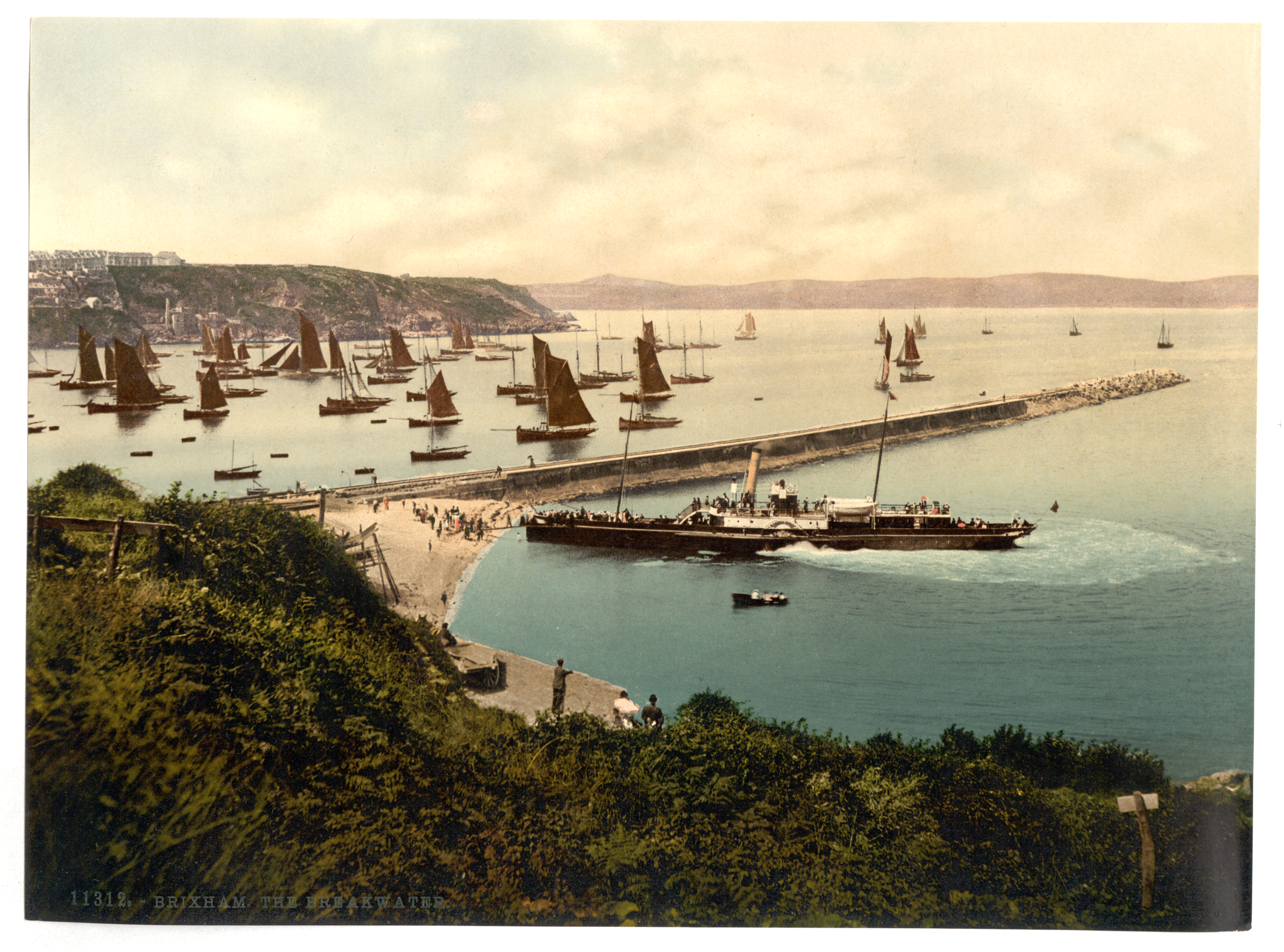
The breakwater around the turn of the 20th Century

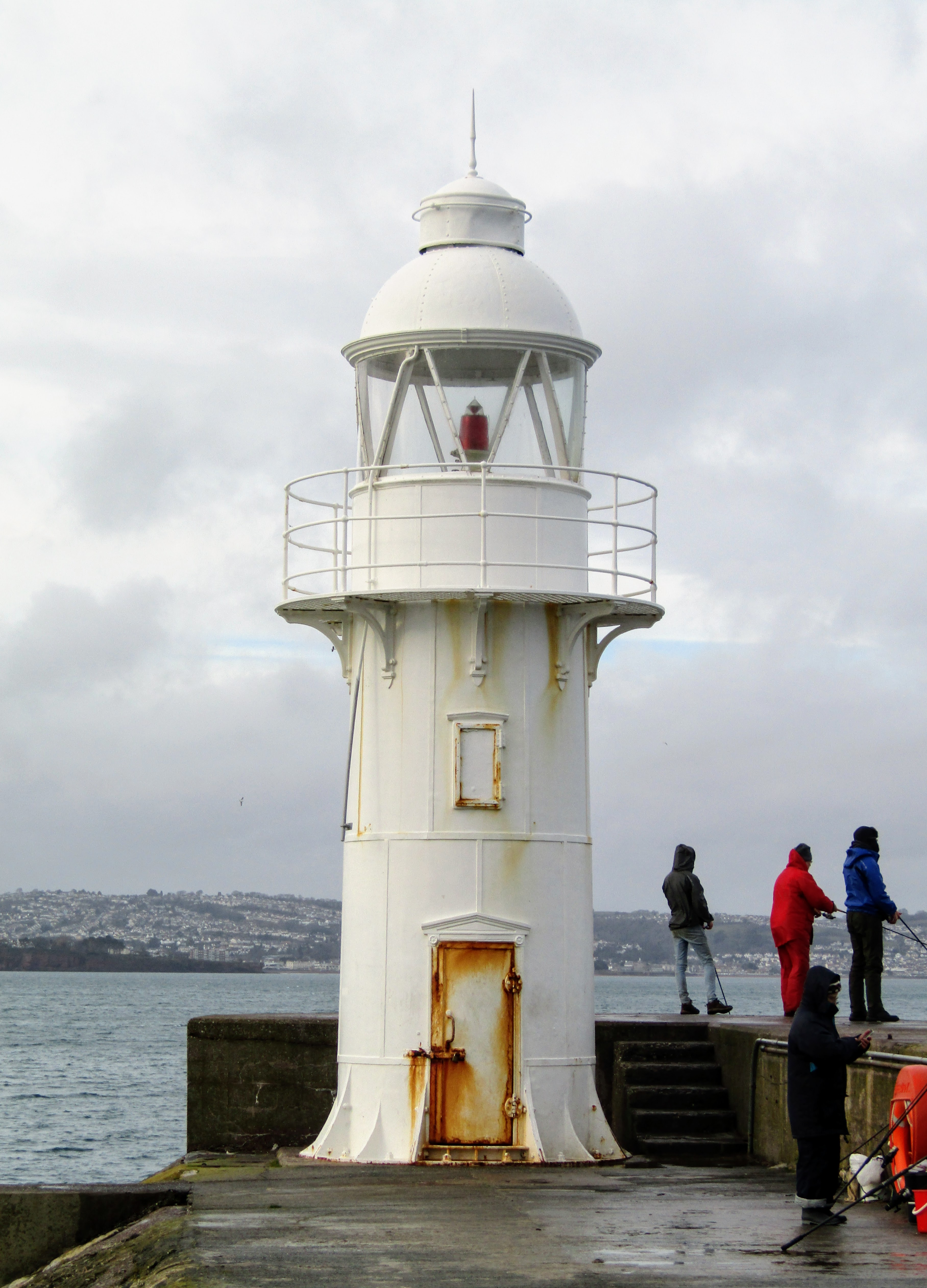
The Brixham Breakwater Lighthouse
