= Environmental surveying =

Profession of impact assessment

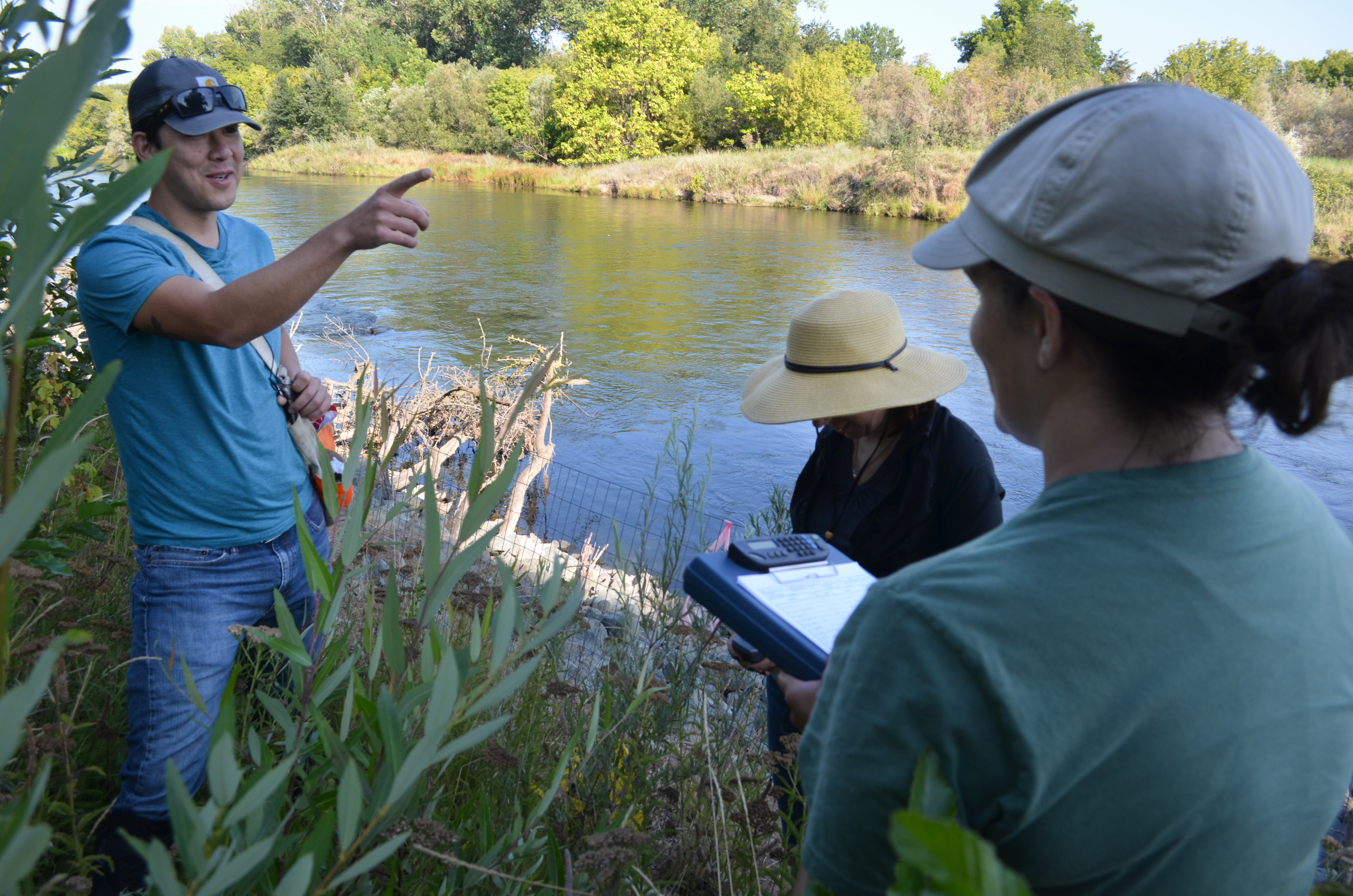

Environmental surveying is the title of a profession within the wider field of surveying, the practitioners of which are known as environmental surveyors. Environmental surveyors use surveying techniques to understand the potential impact of environmental factors on real estate and construction developments, and conversely the impact that real estate and construction developments will have on the environment.

== Professional activities ==
The exact activities that make up the day-to-day work of an environmental surveyor vary from surveyor to surveyor and from project to project. Two environmental surveyors could have careers that consist of quite different professional activities depending on their and their practices area of specialisation.

In the strictest sense, the field of environmental surveying is distinct from that of environmental consultancy. Environmental consultancies may have some overlap with the work of environmental surveyors, but may be members of different professional bodies and may carry out activities not involving the built environment. They may for example be involved with arboriculture the specifics of which fall out of the remit of environmental surveyors. The terms are however sometimes used interchangeably, and practices often use the term consultants if the practice is seeking a wider client base than would be attracted to a pure Environmental Surveyor practice.

== Main areas of operation ==
The main areas of operation for environmental surveyors in the UK include:

- Flood risk assessment- This is to assess how likely it is that a building or proposed building will flood. If a building is thought to be at risk it will receive a designation of either Band 1 (200:1 chance of flooding in a year) Band 2 (between 200:1 and 75:1 chance of flooding annually) or Band 3 (greater than a 75:1 chance of flooding annually, currently thought to account for around 4% of flood risk properties in the UK).
- Contaminated land assessment- Contaminated land surveys are carried out to assess the level of threat posed to existing or proposed buildings. Land can be contaminated if it is on or near a site that is currently or has in the past been used for industrial or waste disposal purposes. Such surveys form part of the due diligence that must be carried out before construction or modification of a real estate asset can begin. Both during and after construction a contaminated land survey could be an important factor in informing risk management strategies.
- Environmental screenings- Provide a general overview of environmental risks proposed to an existing or proposed real estate development. The screening can help gain a picture of: whether or not the property in question might have been damaged by undermining, whether the property might be susceptible to ground gas, the closeness of government licensed waste disposal facilities and an assessment of a properties water resource vulnerability to contamination.
- Fire risk assessment- All work premises in the UK must have a fire risk assessment. The assessment is designed to ascertain what could start a fire, how the fire could be dealt with and ensuring that the staff will be sufficiently warned of a fire, have exits from the building and a safe place to congregate afterwards.
- Asbestos surveys- Because asbestos is extremely dangerous material to the health of humans, its use is strictly controlled. 52 countries globally have now banned the substance. The substance is banned by the European Union, with the exception of its use in a very limited number of specific industrial applications. Because of its widespread use in the building industry before banning, many existing buildings contain asbestos and sites where buildings have been previously may have been contaminated with it. For this reason buildings may need an asbestos survey to ascertain the level of use of the substance and the level of contamination to the site this has resulted in.

== Techniques ==
Environmental Surveyors use a range of techniques to assess the environmental conditions of an area and compile their reports.

- Historical data is drawn from maps and older survey information to establish the exact boundaries of a property, and are also used to see if there has been any historical pollution or waste dumping on the site.
- Water Sampling allows Environmental Surveyors to gain a picture of the quality of and pollution levels in local water sources.
- In a similar way to Water Sampling, Earth Sampling can be used to analyse the level of pollutants in an area’s soil.
- Geometric data may used to establish areas that are likely to flood or monitor the spread of pollutants.
- Geographic information systems (GISs) can cross reference map data with statistical data. If an Environmental Surveyor was compiling a flood report for a building and wanted to establish the odds of a property flooding in any given year then they could cross reference the geographic location of a property with historically obtained statistical data on flooding in the area.
- Visual Inspection might be used if for example the surveyor wished to establish the level of asbestos contamination to a given property. This might be enhanced by or presented in reference to the collection

== Chartered practitioners ==
In the UK as well as in many other countries globally, recognition by the Royal Institution of Chartered Surveyors (RICS) is looked upon as conferring a high professional standard, and guaranteeing a level of quality in the work of its member surveyors. Environmental Surveyors form one professional group within RICS and are listed in their Land Professional Group. To achieve the status of chartered environmental surveyor, the candidate must pass an assessment of professional competencies (APC). This consists of completing structured work experience and providing written documents as evidence of the activities carried out during this work experience. Finally the candidate must pass an hour long oral exam. All surveyors regardless of their field are required to demonstrate mastery of RICS core competencies, and then move on to demonstrate knowledge of competencies in their specific fields. Competencies specific to environmental surveying include:

- sustainability
- contaminated land
- environmental assessment
- environmental audit
- laboratory procedures
- management of the natural environment and landscape

Outside of the UK, other professional bodies may offer equivalent designations to signify the professional level of environmental surveyors.

== See also ==
- Phase I environmental site assessment
