= Warfleet Creek =

Tidal inlet on the River Dart in Devon, England

Coordinates: 50°20′35″N 3°34′22″W

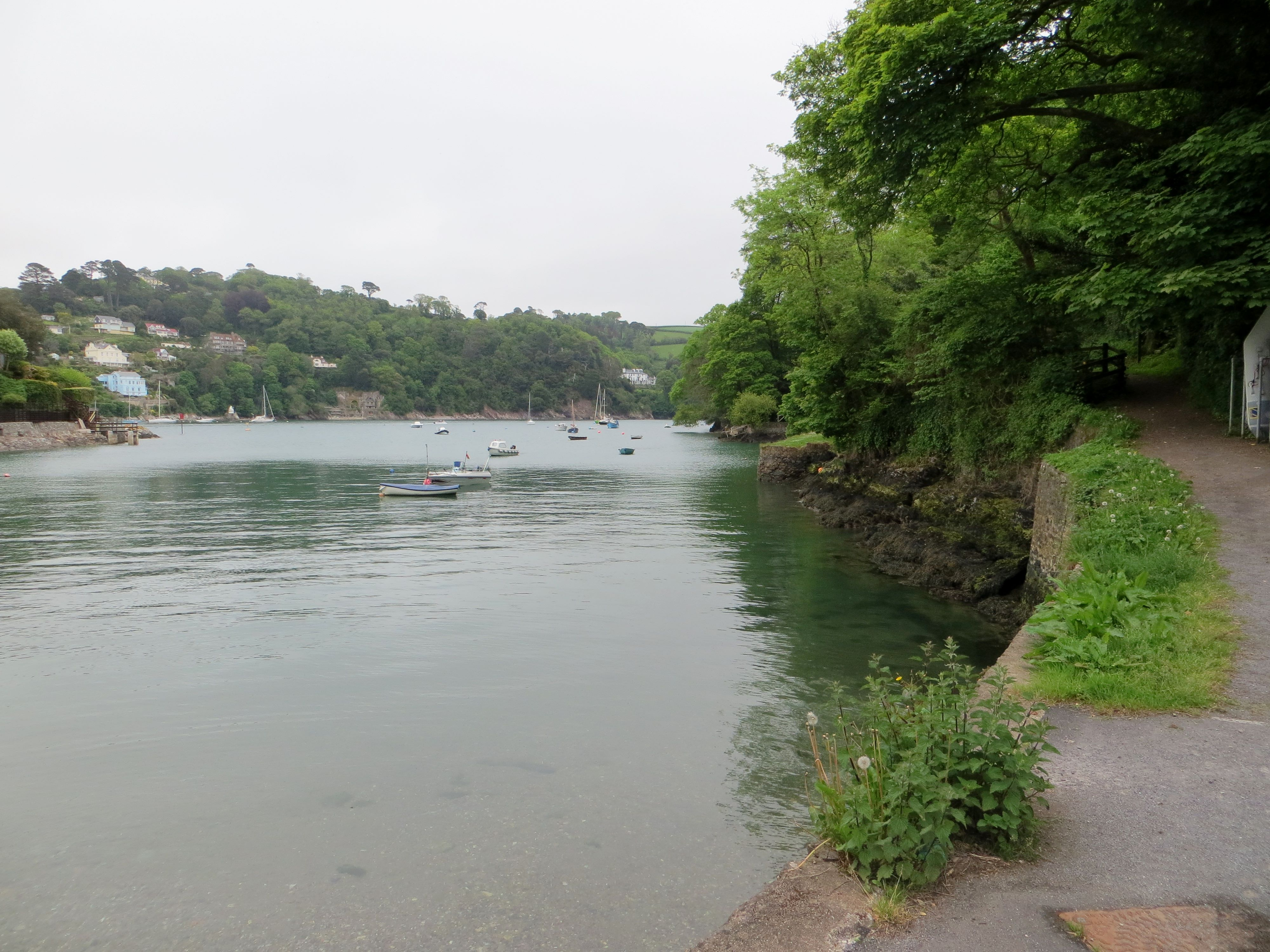
Warfleet Creek

Warfleet Creek is a small triangular tidal inlet in the west side of the River Dart estuary in England. It is near Dartmouth, Devon. It has steep rocky sides. At low tide there is a stony beach with some small rockpools.

== British Underwater Centre ==
The British Underwater Centre was one of the premises along its north side. It had anchorage for boats, and facilities for training in scuba diving and standard diving. It was run by Captain Trevor Hampton who was based there for many years.

== Dartmouth Pottery ==
The creek was home to Dartmouth Pottery, a local landmark building which has had many uses over 400 years, now converted to residential and holiday apartments.

== Etymology ==
According to "The place-names of Devon", by J E B Gover, A Mawer and F M Stenton, volume 1 page 321, the etymology is uncertain. But since all early spellings start with Wal- or Wel-, it is not named after the "war fleets" of the crusades of 1147 and 1190, although the harbour of Dartmouth has seen many other war fleets, not least the American fleet en route to Utah Beach on D Day. The second element comes from Anglo-Saxon flēot = "estuary, tidal creek". One possibility is Anglo-Saxon Wēala flēot = "the estuary or creek of the Britons", if the Anglo-Saxons arriving found a settlement of Celtic-speaking or Vulgar Latin-speaking British natives there (perhaps using it as a fishing boat harbour). The name is believed by local historian Ray Freeman to derive from Wall (perverted to War) and River/Stream (a meaning of Fleet). There is a stream at the head of the creek by a wall. The story that crusaders fleets moored there is believed by her to be an invention of local river cruise drivers looking for a more entertaining (but untrue) version of history.

== See also ==
Fort Bovisand
