= Jissen Kyōtei =

1995 video game

- Cover art
- Developer: Aisystem Tokyo
- Publisher: Imagineer
- Designers: Katsuhiko Sugiyama; Tadashi Kitamura
- Composers: Masahito Miyamoto; Kiyohiro Sada; Minako Adachi
- Platform: Super Famicom
- Release: JP: June 23, 1995
- Genres: Gambling; Racing (watercraft-related)
- Mode: Single-player

Jissen Kyōtei (実戦競艇; "Combat Racing") is a Japan-exclusive video game for the Super Famicom.

== Summary ==
Cutscene from the story mode opening.

The game allows players to gamble on the Kyōtei races that are held across Japan every year. Players have to bet money on up to three motorboats for a duration of anywhere from six to 24 months in a series of hydroplane racing events. There is an opportunity to talk to the boss once a month. Each month consists of 24 races (each with a qualifying round, a semi-final round, and a final round). Almost anything about the competitors can be analyzed, including their name, the odds for each driver, and the selections for each player. After making their bets, each player must confirm their bets in order to move into the racing portion of the game. The AI competitors are skilled like professional racers.

Each race consists of three laps, with each participant doing left turns around an oval track with four turns. After the end of the third lap, the finishing order is displayed. The next screen shows how much money each of the players gained or lost. Each race is shown on different camera angles, ranging from side view to a reverse chase view.

During a race.

== Reception ==
On release, Famicom Tsūshin scored the game a 16 out of 40.
