= Ted Jones (hydroplanes) =

Tudor Owen ("Ted") Jones (died January 9, 2000) was an American hydroplane designer and builder.

== Biography ==
According to Tex Johnston, "Seattleite Ted Jones, a keen marine engineer, designed a revolutionary speedboat, the hydroplane, supported at high speed by two sponsons - streamlined, buoyant, lateral extensions - attached to the forward sides of the boat's wide, flat body. The hydroplane was powered by an Allison aircraft engine identical to the one I modified for Cobra II."

One of his boats, the Slo-Mo-Shun IV, won the 1950 Gold Cup, and set a water speed record (160.323 mph) in Lake Washington, off Seattle (USA)'s Sand Point, on June 26, 1950, breaking the previous (10+ year-old) record (141.740 mph) by almost 20 mph. He also designed several other unlimited hydroplanes that won the APBA Challenge Cup.

== Legacy ==
His son, Ron Jones, Sr., and grandson Ron Jones, Jr. both also had distinguished careers with unlimited hydroplane racing.

== Award ==
He was inducted in the Motorsports Hall of Fame of America in 2003.
