= Hydroplane (boat) =

Type of motorboat

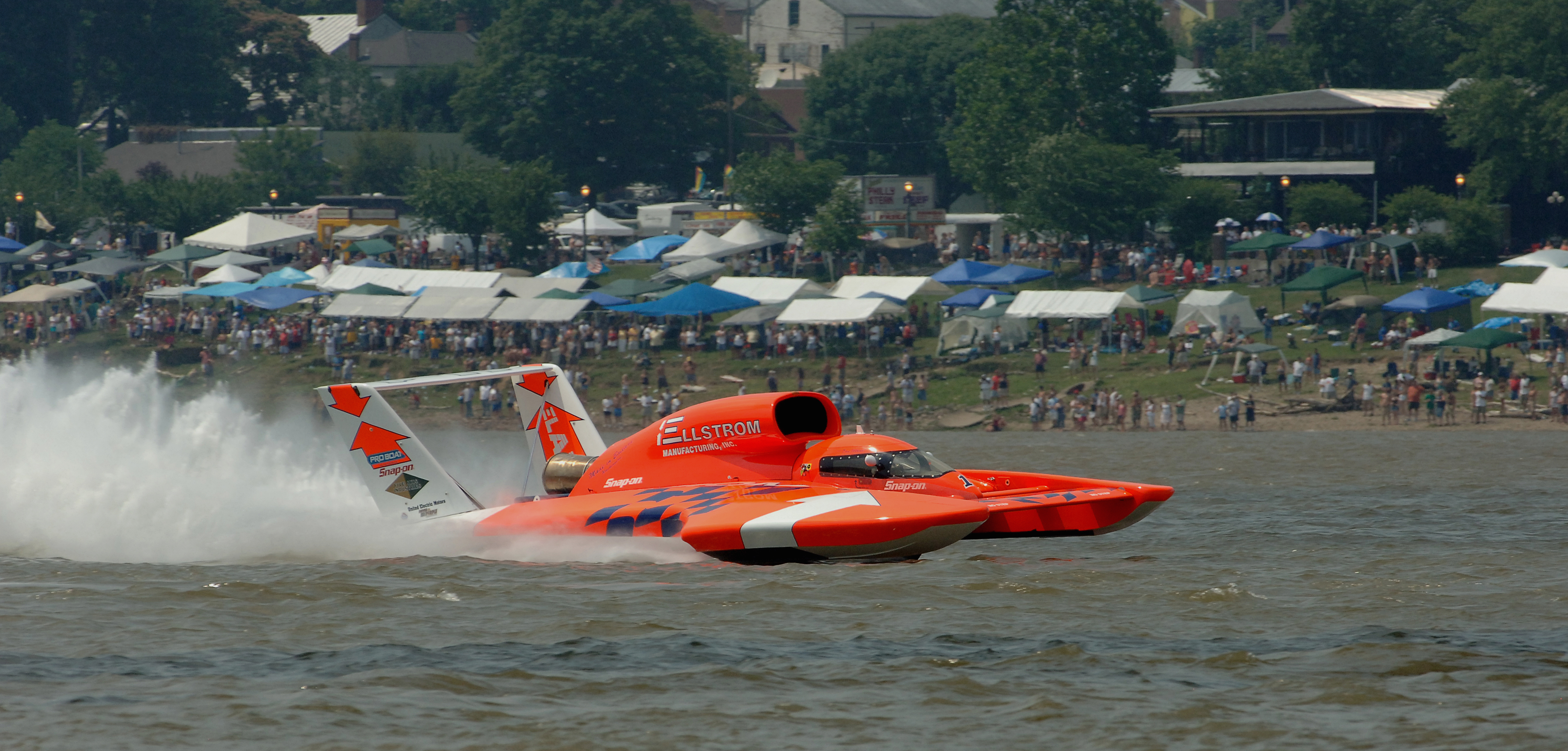
Ellstrom Elam Plus, at the 2006 Madison Regatta

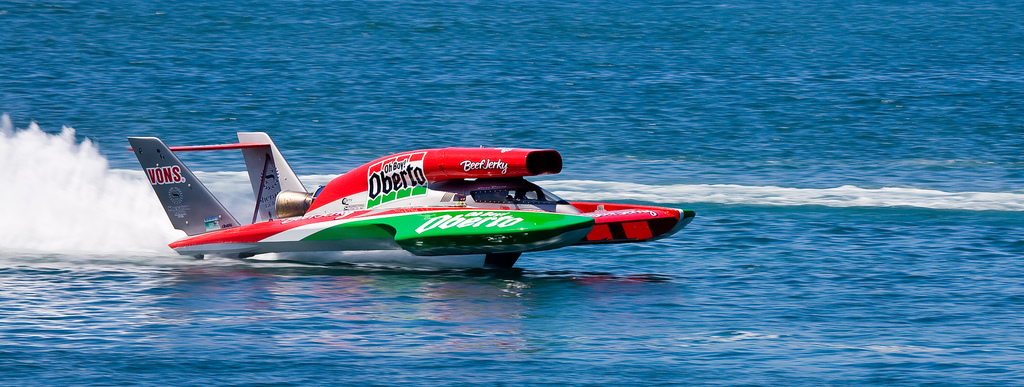
Miss Madison / Oh Boy! Oberto unlimited hydroplane in 2007, with extended air scoop

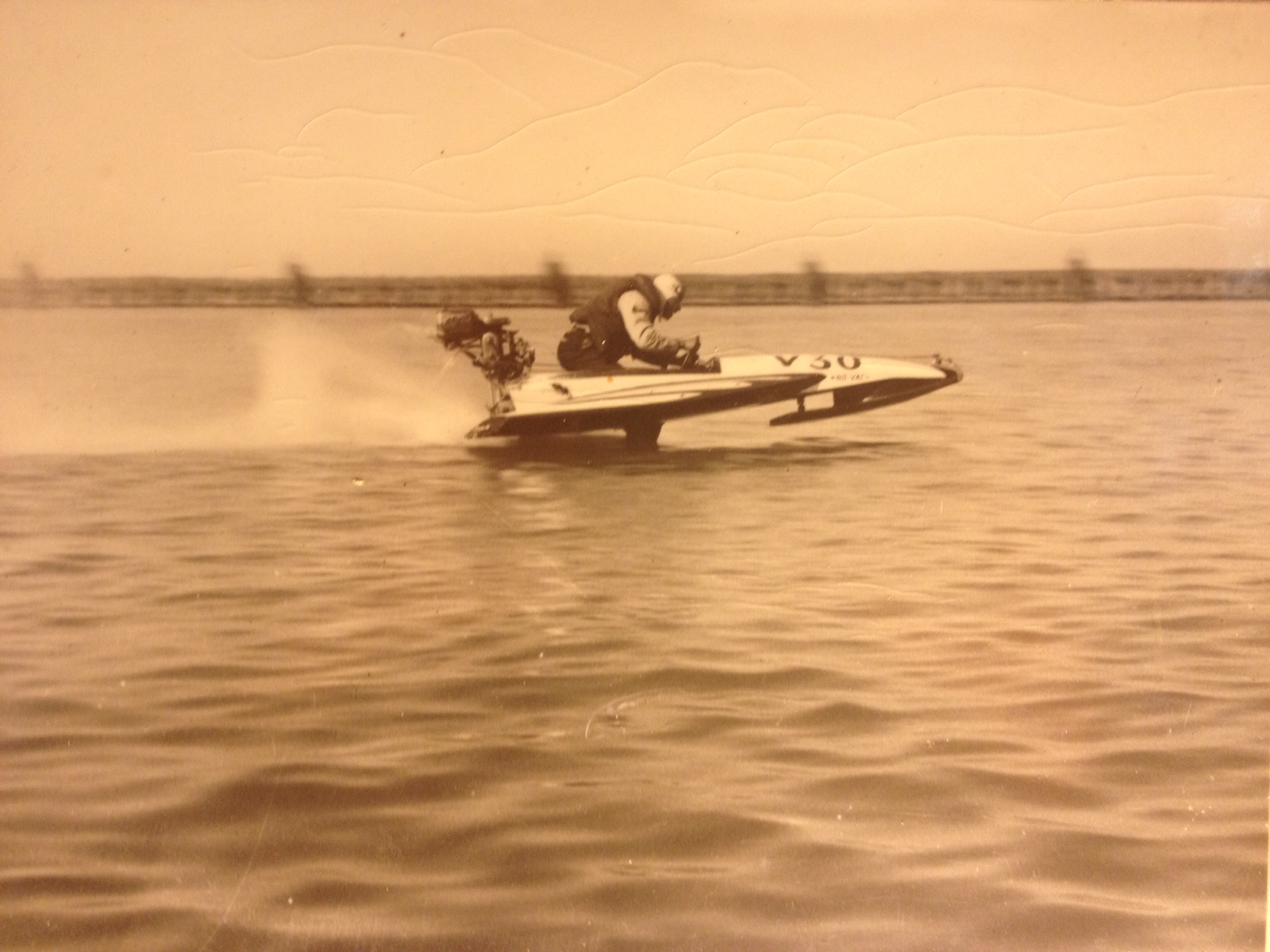
No-Vac at speed, 1933

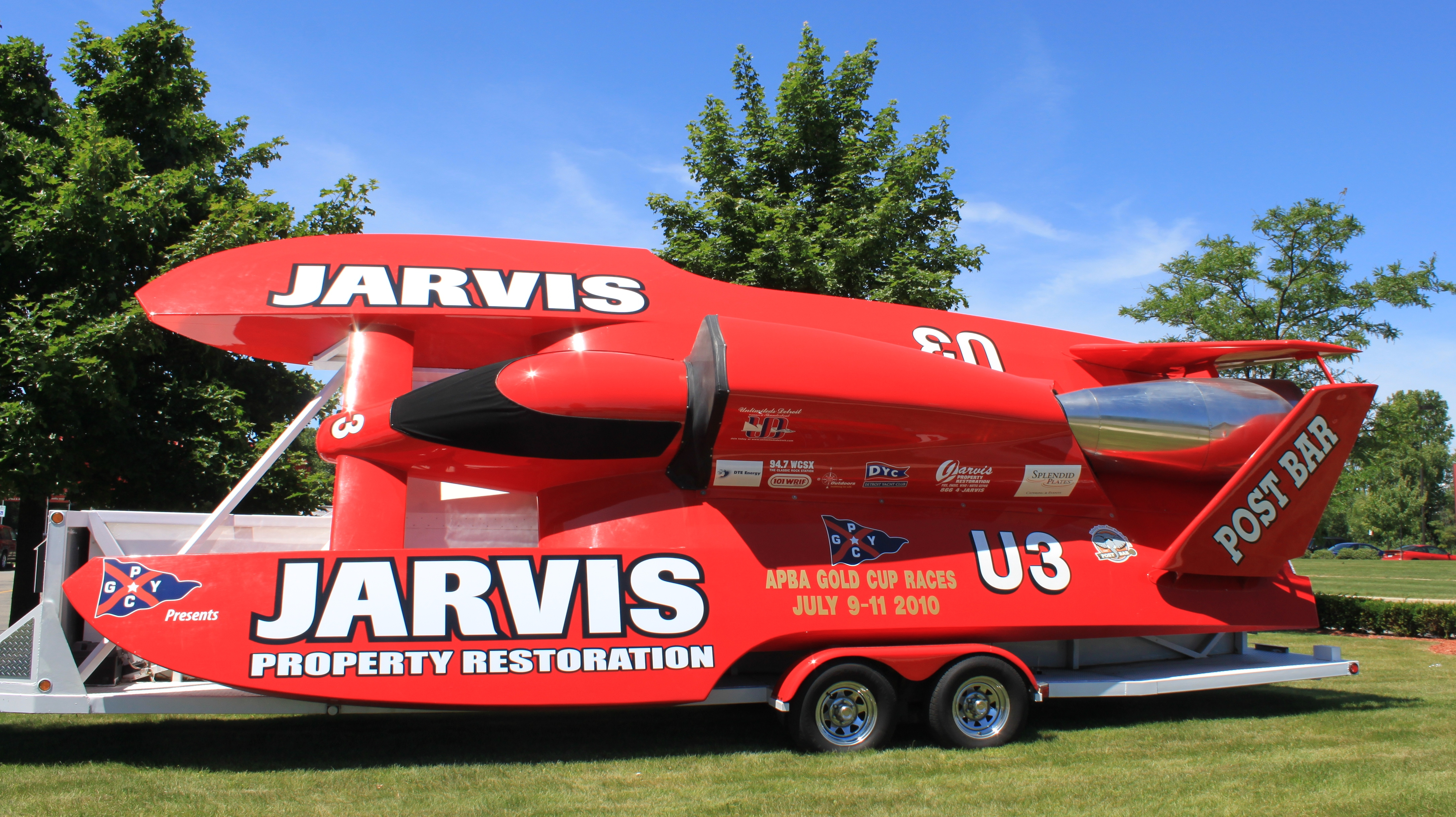
Miss Jarvis on transport trailer, 2010

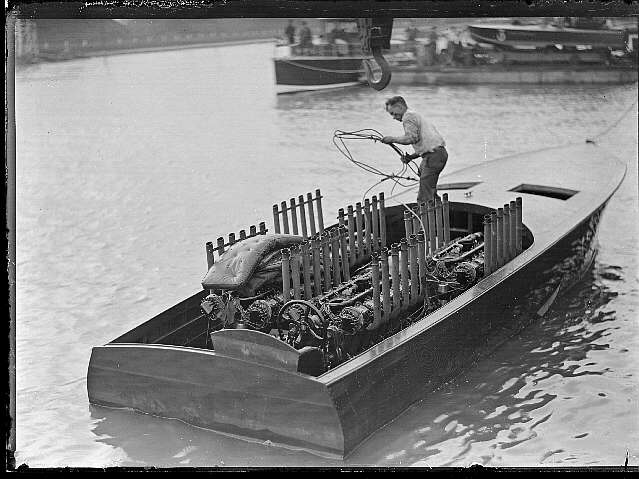
Hydroplane Miss America II on the Maumee River in Toledo, 1920

A hydroplane (or hydro, or thunderboat) is a fast motorboat, where the hull shape is such that at speed, the weight of the boat is supported by planing forces, rather than simple buoyancy.

A key aspect of hydroplanes is that they use the water they are on for lift rather than buoyancy, as well as for propulsion and steering: when travelling at high speed water is forced downwards by the bottom of the boat's hull. The water therefore exerts an equal and opposite force upwards, lifting the vast majority of the hull out of the water. This process, happening at the surface of the water, is known as 'foiling'.

== Hydroplane design ==
Early designs of the 1920s were often built by amateurs, who employed the lightest materials available to them at the time, which were often glued timber boarding or plywood on the floor, 4-millimetre (0.16 in) plywood topsides, and varnished canvas decks. Most were about 4 metres (13 ft) long and stepped hulls were employed with a 75-millimetre (3.0 in) step to induce air under the hull, to enable the boat to float on air bubbles. The principle behind 'planing' was not fully understood. Thus, hulls were flat bottomed with an upward curve at the bow and the step 2/3 of the way aft. The sheer weight of a 100 hp. engine was enough to keep the bow from digging in. In Ireland the sport was managed by the Motor Yacht Club of Ireland which had a base at the Lough Ree Yacht Club near Athlone.

One of the earliest examples can be seen in the May 1935 Popular Mechanics issue. "Mile A Minute-Thrills of the Water" tells the story of the No-Vac by LeRoy F. Malrose Sr. aka. Fred W. McQuigg (pen name). Malrose was the lead design illustrator for Popular Mechanics magazine, which at the time was located in Chicago. The No-Vac design and build actually began in 1933, when Malrose conceptualized an airfoil hull surface design which proved to produce far less drag than conventional "V" style boat hull designs of the time. In June 1933 the No-Vac was put to the test with professional racing driver Jimmy Rodgers at the helm. That day the No-Vac set the world water speed record for an outboard powered boat of 78 miles per hour (126 km/h).

The basic hull design of most hydroplanes has remained relatively unchanged since the 1950s: two sponsons in front, one on each side of the bow; behind the wide bow, is a narrower, mostly rectangular section housing the driver, engine, and steering equipment. The aft part of the vessel is supported in the water by the lower half of the propeller, which is designed to operate semi-submerged at all times. The goal is to keep as little of the boat in contact with the water as possible, as water is much denser than air, exerting more drag on the vehicle. Essentially the boat 'flies' over the surface of the water rather than actually traveling through it.

One of the few significant attempts at a radically different design since the three-point propriding design was introduced was referred to as Canard. It reversed the width properties, having a very narrow bow that only touched the water in one place, and two small outrigger sponsons in the back.

Early hydroplanes had mostly straight lines and flat surfaces aside from the uniformly curved bow and sponsons. The curved bow was eventually replaced by what is known as a pickle fork bow, where a space is left between the front few feet of the sponsons. Also, the centered single, vertical tail (similar to the ones on most modern airplanes) was gradually replaced by a horizontal stabilizer supported by vertical tails on either side of the boat. Later, as fine-tuning the hydrodynamics became more important, the bottoms of the main hull have subtle curves to give the best lift.

== Unlimited hydroplane engines ==
The aviation industry has been the main source of engines for the boats. For the first few decades after World War II, they used surplus World War II–era internal-combustion airplane engines, typically Rolls-Royce Merlins or Griffons, or Allison V-1710s, all liquid-cooled V-12s. The loud roar of these engines earned hydroplanes the nickname thunderboats or dinoboats.

The Ted Jones–designed Slo-Mo-Shun IV three-point, Allison-powered hydroplane set the water speed record (160.323 mph) in Lake Washington, off Seattle, Washington's Sand Point, on June 26, 1950, breaking the previous (ten-plus-year-old) record (141.740 mph (228.108 km/h) by almost 20 mph (32 km/h). Donald Campbell set seven world water speed records between 1955 and 1964 in the jet engine hydroplane, Bluebird.

Starting in 1980, they have increasingly used Vietnam War–era turboshaft engines from helicopters (in 1973–1974, one hydroplane, U-95, used turbine engines in races to test the technology). The most commonly used turbine is the Lycoming T55, used in the CH-47 Chinook.

Efforts have occasionally been made to use automotive engines, but they generally have not proven competitive.

The "limited" classes of inboard hydroplane racing are organized under the name Inboard Powerboat Circuit. These classes utilize automotive power, as well as two-stroke power. There are races throughout the country from April to October. Many Unlimited drivers got their start in the "limited" classes.

Prior to 1977, every official water speed record had been set by an American, Briton, Irishman or Canadian. On November 20, Australian Ken Warby piloted his Spirit of Australia purely on the jet thrust of its Westinghouse J34 turbojet to a velocity of 464.5 km/h (288.6 mph) to beat Lee Taylor's record. Warby, who had built the craft in his back yard, used the publicity to find sponsorship to pay for improvements to the Spirit. On October 8, 1978, Warby travelled to Blowering Dam, Australia, and broke both the 480 km/h (300 mph) and 500 km/h (310 mph) barriers with an average speed of 510 km/h (320 mph).

As of 2018, Warby's record still stands, and there have only been two official attempts to break it.

== See also ==
- Hydrofoil, a different concept also applying lift
- Jetboat
- Water speed record
