= Super Kyotei =

1995 video game

- Cover art
- Developer(s): Nichibutsu
- Publisher(s): Nichibutsu
- Platform(s): Super Famicom
- Release: JP: June 30, 1995
- Genre(s): Racing (watercraft-related)
- Mode(s): Single-player

Super Kyotei (スーパー競艇; "Super Racing") is a 1995 Japan-exclusive video game for the Super Famicom. The game allows to compete in the Kyōtei races that are held all across Japan. A sequel with a few improvements was released in 1996.

== Reception ==
On release, Famicom Tsūshin scored the game a 20 out of 40.
