= Ken Warby =

Australian motorboat racer (1939–2023)

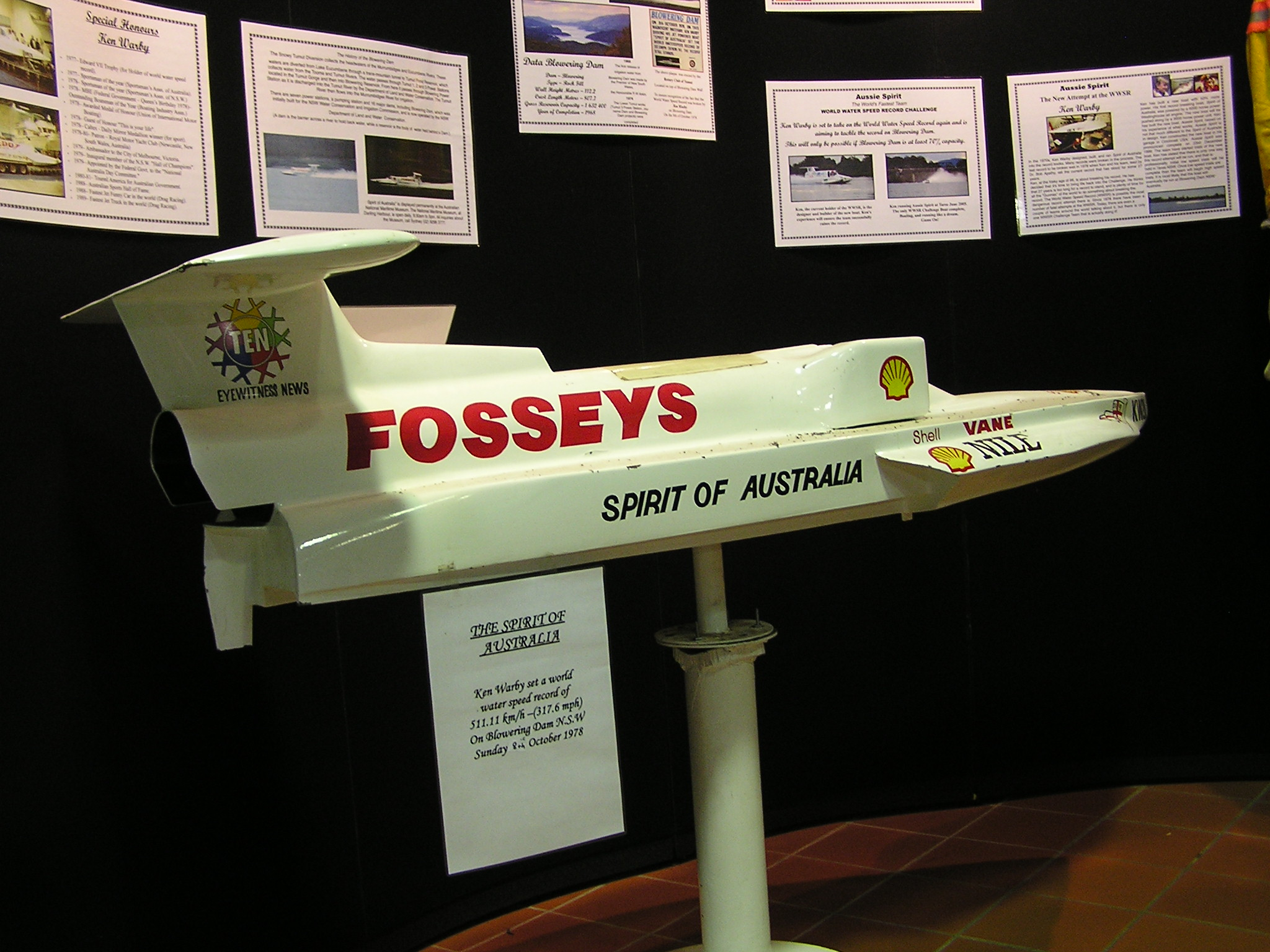
Model of Spirit of Australia in which Ken Warby set the world water speed record in 1978 on Blowering Dam

Ken Warby MBE (9 May 1939 – 20 February 2023) was an Australian motorboat racer, who currently holds the water speed record of 275.97 knots (511.10 km/h; 317.58 mph), set on Blowering Dam on 8 October 1978.

As a child, Warby's hero was Donald Campbell, who died attempting to break the record in 1967.

== The Spirit of Australia ==
Warby designed the hull of his record-breaking boat, Spirit of Australia, himself and built it in his backyard. He started the project as a Makita salesman who happened to team up with two Leading aircraftmen at RAAF Base Richmond in the early 1970s. Warby bought three military surplus Westinghouse jet engines at auction for only $265. It was not in working order, but Crandall and Cox refurbished it. The Spirit was covered with a canvas tarpaulin when it rained and was made of wood and fibreglass.

On 20 November 1977, he set a new world water speed record of 288.60 mph (464.46 km/h), breaking the record of Lee Taylor by a little over 3 mph (4.8 km/h).

With a subsequent 317.6 mph (511.1 km/h) run on 8 October 1978, he set the record that still stands today.

In doing so, he became the first and only person to exceed 300 mph (482.8 km/h) on water and survive. Donald Campbell died on his attempt after his hydroplane crashed at over 320 mph (515 km/h) on his return run in his 1967 record attempt.

== Later boats and retirement ==
By 2003, Warby had designed and built another boat, the Aussie Spirit, with which he planned to increase his own record. Of similar dimensions to Spirit of Australia, it was also powered by a Westinghouse J34 jet engine. The rudder alone on this new boat cost more than the $10,000 all-up cost of the original Spirit. Again, Warby designed, built, self-financed and piloted his own boat. Rule changes meant that a record attempt was never made with it.

Warby retired from record-breaking attempts in 2007. Prior to his death, Ken had been working with his son David on a new boat to break the record. David Warby continues the attempt with the crew that he and his father both used.

== Personal life and death ==
Warby was born in Newcastle, NSW and lived in Australia before moving to Cincinnati, Ohio from 1983 where he died on 20 February 2023 aged 83.
