= Stanley Sayres =

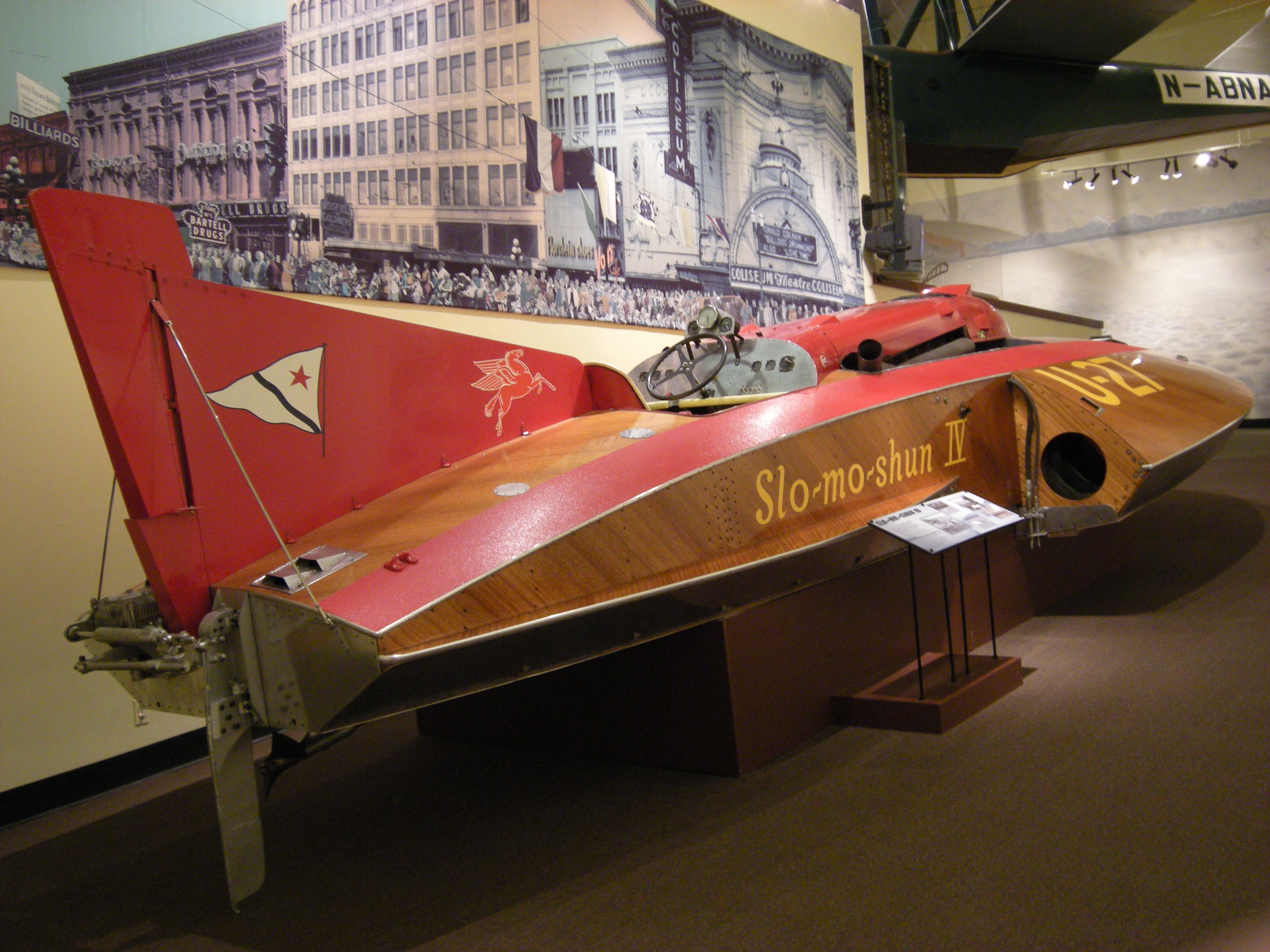
The Slo-mo-shun IV on display at the Museum of History & Industry in Seattle

Stanley St. Claire Sayres (1896 - 17 September 1956) was a hydroplane racer who broke the world water speed record with his "Slo-mo-shun IV" boat.

Sayres was born in Dayton, Washington in 1896, and studied in Walla Walla, Washington at the Whitman College. He entered the army in 1917. After World War I, he ran his own car dealerships in Walla Walla and a second one in Pendleton, Oregon. By 1931, when he moved to Seattle, he owned 5 dealerships.

His Chrysler-Plymouth dealership was located on the corner of Broadway and Madison Street in Seattle. Together with Harry Jensen he founded the successful company Jen-Cel-Lite, which made sleeping bags using cellulose for insulation. Harry's brother Tony owned Jensen Motor Boat Company, and this sparked the interest in motor boat racing Sayres would have for the rest of his life.

From 1937 onward, he owned a series of successful hydroplane racing boats called Slo-mo-shun I to V. The first ones were bought in 1937 and 1942 from Jack Cooper; the Slo-mo-shun II had with its previous owner and under its previous name Topps III set a world record for its class (225-class boats) at 87.48 mph. The 1947 Slo-mo-shun III was the first boat specially ordered by Sayres, again in the 225 class. It marked the start of the collaboration between Sayres, designer Ted Jones, and builder Anchor Jensen (son of Tony). The Slo-mo-shun IV was built between 1948 and October 1949, the Slo-mo-shun V in 1951. It was the last boat he built.

Usually, he let others drive the boats, but in 1950 he piloted the Slo-mo-shun IV to the World Unlimited water speed record. Malcolm Campbell had set the record in 1939 to 141.740 mph (228.108 km/h) with his Blue Bird K4. On 26 June 1950, Sayres broke that record when he reached 160.323 mph (258.015 km/h). He again improved this record on 7 July 1952 to 178.49 mph (287.25 km/h). This record stood until July 1955 when Donald Campbell, son of the former record holder, reached 202.32 mph (325.60 km/h) in the Bluebird K7.

In the early 1950s, his two boats Slo-mo-shun IV and Slo-mo-shun V (with various drivers including Ted Jones) were the 6-times winners of the APBA Gold Cup, the most important hydroplane race in the United States. The IV also won the Harmsworth Cup in 1950, making it the only boat to win the two most important trophies and set the world speed record in one year.

Sayres died of a heart attack in 1956. The Stan Sayres Memorial Park in Seattle is named after him.
