= Feiseen =

1893 steam yacht

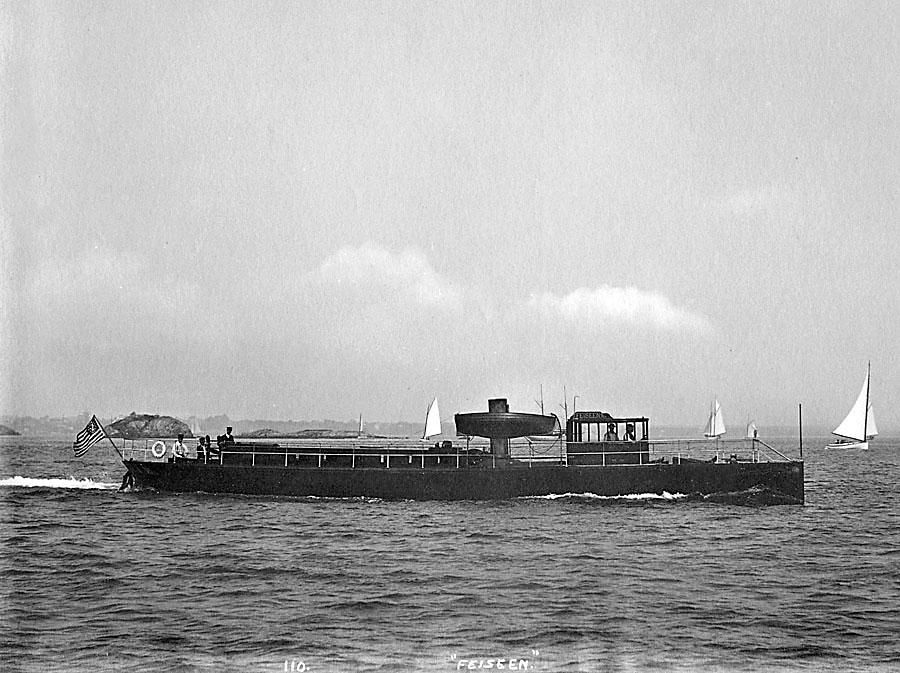
- Feiseen at sea in 1893.

History
- Name: Feiseen
- Owner: William B. Cogswell
- Commissioned: 1893
- Maiden voyage: 1893

General characteristics
- Displacement: 13 tons
- Length: 78 ft 9 in (24.00 m)
- Beam: 9 ft 8 in (2.95 m)
- Draft: 3 ft 1 in (0.94 m)
- Installed power: 600 hp (450 kW)
- Propulsion: Quadruple expansion steam engine
- Speed: 31.6 mph (27.5 kn)

Feiseen was a 78 feet 9 inches (24.00 m) long steam yacht built in 1893 which set the water speed record on 25 August 1893 with a speed of 31.6 mph (27.5 kn).

== History ==
Feiseen was a 78 feet 9 inches (24.00 m) long steam yacht built in 1893 under commission by William B. Cogswell, and was designed by William Gardner and Charles Mosher. It displaced 13 tons and was powered by a quadruple expansion steam engine which could output 600 horsepower (450 kW).

On 25 August 1893, Feiseen outpaced the Monmouth in a 7.25-mile race to break the water speed record with a speed of 31.6 mph (27.5 kn), previously held by the Adler.

On 1 November 1893, the Brazilian government purchased Feiseen for an estimated cost of $20,000 (equivalent to $699,926 in 2024). She had 9 feet added to her length, was renamed to Inhanduay and converted into a torpedo boat to be stationed on the Nictheroy.
