= Spirit of Australia =

Australian jet boat

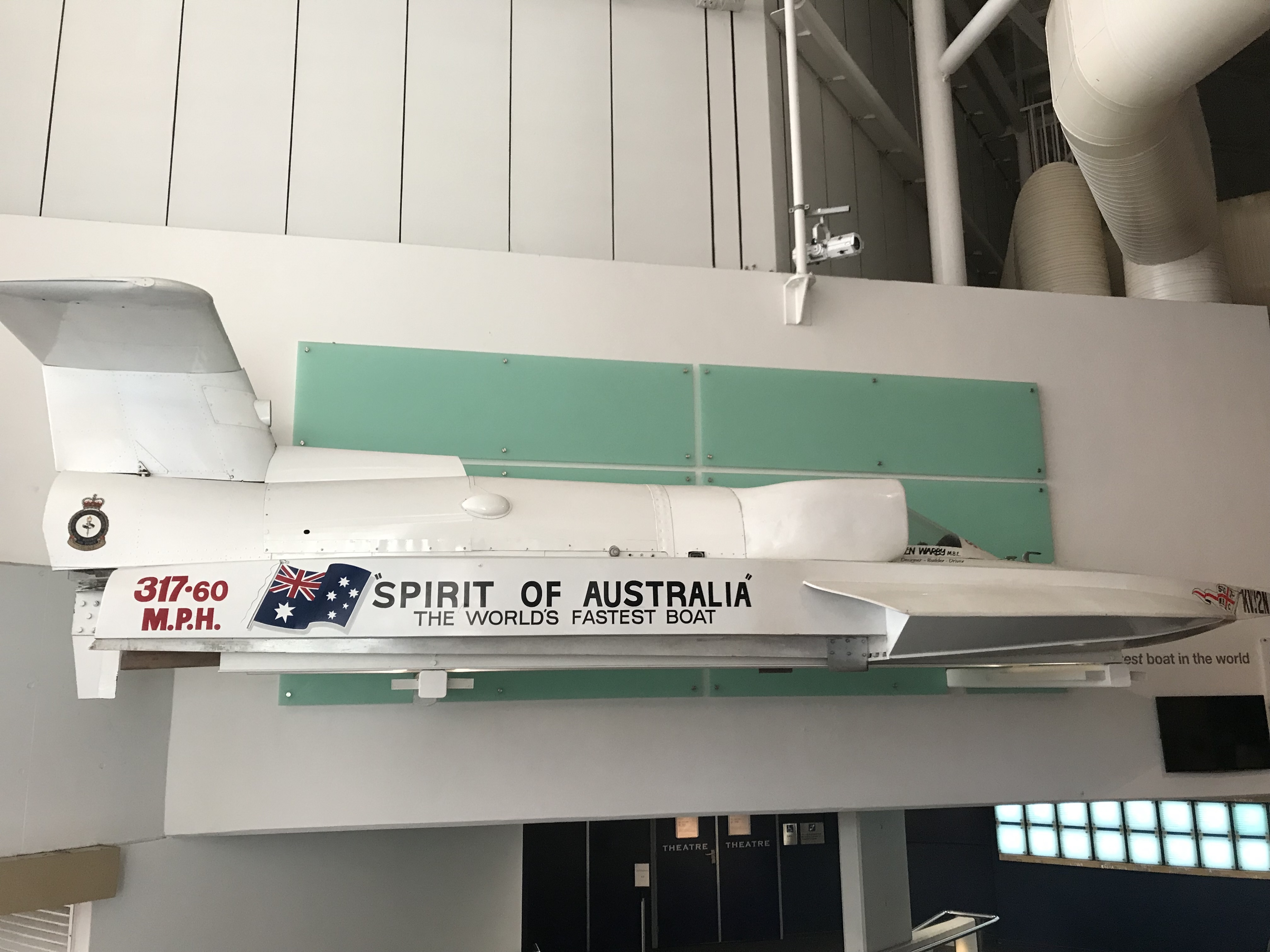
Spirit of Australia in which Ken Warby set the world water speed record in 1978 on Blowering Dam, New South Wales, Australia. In the Australian Maritime Museum in Sydney.

Spirit of Australia is a wooden speed boat built in a Sydney backyard, by Ken Warby, that broke and set the world water speed record on 8 October 1978 with a speed of 511.11 km/h (317.58 mph).

== The record and boat ==
On 8 October 1978, Ken Warby rode the Spirit of Australia on Blowering Dam in Australia on opposite direction runs of 492.813 km/h (306.220 mph; 266.098 kn) and 529.412 km/h (328.961 mph; 285.860 kn), for an official record speed of 511.11 km/h (317.59 mph; 275.98 kn), with a peak speed of 555 km/h (345 mph; 300 kn). It was powered by a Westinghouse J34 jet engine. The engine was developed by the Westinghouse Electric Company in the late 1940s and was used for jet fighters and other aircraft. Spirit of Australia is displayed permanently at the Australian National Maritime Museum in Darling Harbour, Sydney, New South Wales.

== Successors ==
Starting in the early 1990s, Warby built a second jet boat, Aussie Spirit, powered with a fresh Westinghouse J34, but he never made a record attempt with it. Warby and his son Dave then worked on a new boat, Spirit of Australia II, powered by a Bristol Siddeley Orpheus jet engine taken from an Italian Fiat G.91 fighter. This was completed in December 2004. In 2007 Ken Warby handed over the reins to his son who achieved 447 km/h (278 mph; 241 kn) on a testing run on Blowering Dam in August 2024. As of 22 May 2021 the team are still modifying the design.

== See also ==
- World Sailing Speed Record Council
- List of vehicle speed records
