= List of water speed records =

Officially recognised fastest speed achieved by a water-borne vehicle

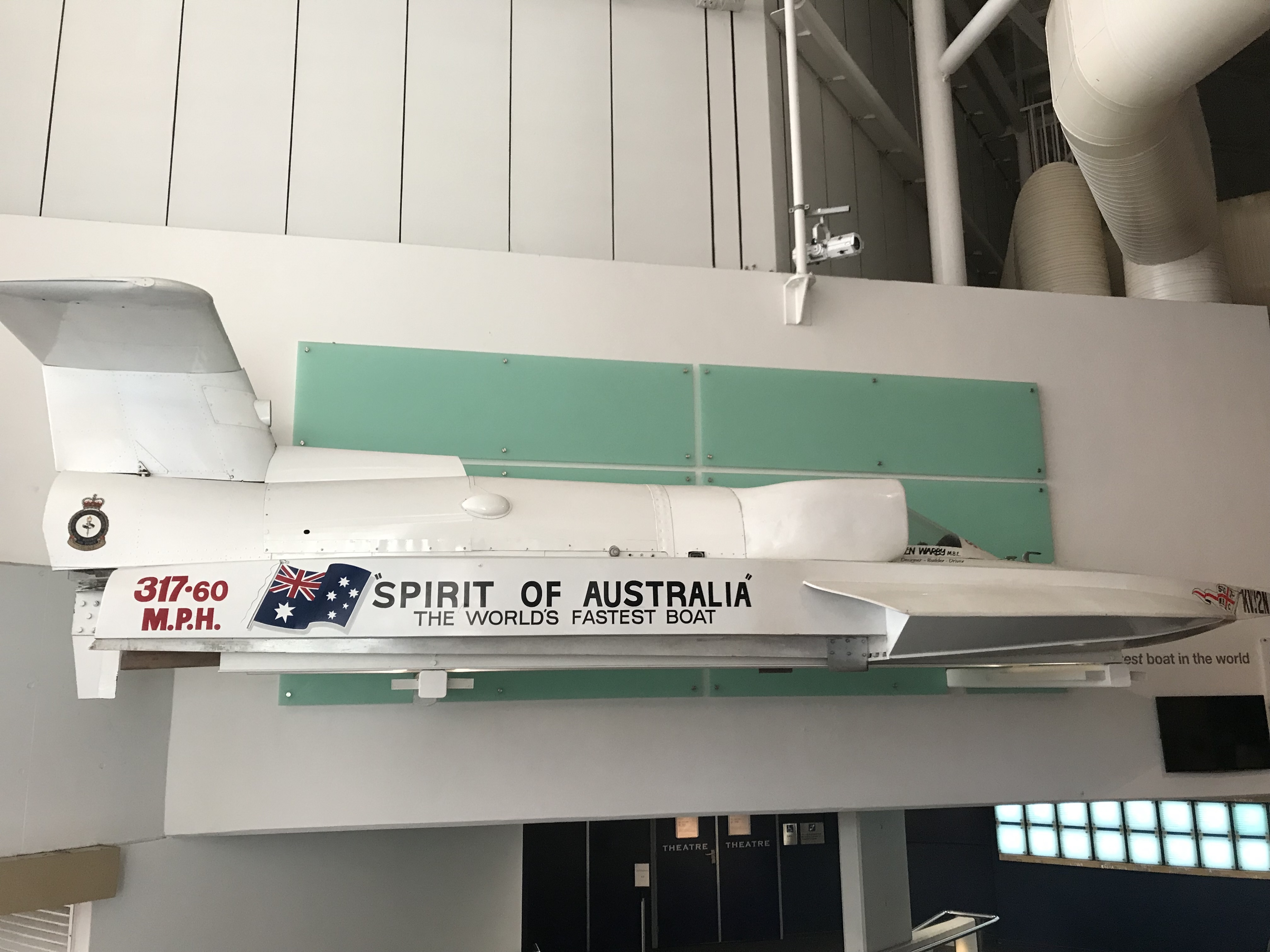
The actual Spirit of Australia in which Ken Warby set the world water speed record in 1978 on Blowering Dam, New South Wales, Australia, on display in the Australian Maritime Museum in Sydney

The world unlimited water speed record is the officially recognised fastest speed achieved by a water-borne vehicle, irrespective of propulsion method. The current unlimited record is 511.11 km/h (317.59 mph; 275.98 kn), achieved by Australian Ken Warby in the Spirit of Australia on 8 October 1978. Warby's record still stands almost half a century later.

The record is one of the sporting world's most hazardous competitions; seven of the thirteen people who have attempted it since June 1930 have died trying. Only two official attempts have been made to beat Ken Warby's 1978 record--those of Lee Taylor in 1980 and Craig Arfons in 1989, both of whom perished in the attempt.

The record is ratified by the Union Internationale Motonautique (UIM).

== Before 1910 ==
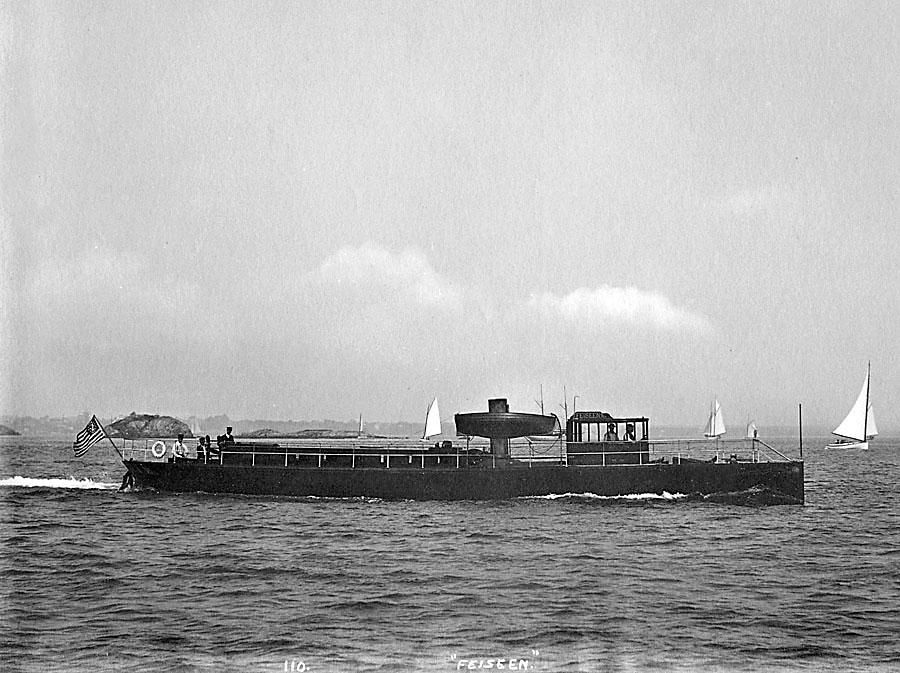
William Cogswell's steam yacht Feiseen, which set a new world speed record on 25 August 1893 of 50.8 km/h (31.6 mph)

Until 1911, steam-powered, propeller-driven vehicles held world water speed records.

- 1885, Nathanael Herreshoff's Stiletto: 42.2 km/h (26.2 mph)
- 1893, William B. Cogswell's Feiseen: 50.9 km/h (31.6 mph)
- 1897, Charles Algernon Parsons' Turbinia: 62.9 km/h (39.1 mph)
- 1903, Charles R. Flint's Arrow: 72.5 km/h (45.06 mph)

== 1910s ==
In 1911, a 12 m (40 ft) stepped planing hull, Dixie IV, designed by Clinton Crane, became the first gasoline-powered vessel to break the water speed record.

In March 1911, the Maple Leaf III, which was powered by two twelve-cylinder motors producing 350 hp each, set a new water speed record of 57 mph (92 km/h) on The Solent.

Beginning in 1908, Alexander Graham Bell and engineer Frederick W. "Casey" Baldwin began experimenting with powered watercraft. In 1919, with Baldwin piloting their HD-4 hydrofoil, a new world water speed record of 114.0 km/h (70.86 mph) was set on Bras d'Or Lake at Baddeck, Nova Scotia.

== 1920s ==
In 1920, Garfield Wood set a new water speed record of 71.43 mph (114.96 km/h) on the Detroit River, using a new boat called Miss America. In the following twelve years, Wood built nine more Miss Americas and broke the record five times. Increased public interest generated by the speeds achieved by Wood and others led to an official speed record being ratified in 1928. The first person to try a record attempt was Wood's brother, George. On 4 September 1928, he drove Miss America VII to 149.40 km/h (92.8 mph) on the Detroit River. The next year, Gar Wood took the same boat up a waterway Indian Creek, Miami Beach and reached 149.86 km/h (93.12 mph).

== 1930s ==
In the 1930s, the water speed record, like the land speed record, became a contest for national honour between the United Kingdom and the United States. American success in setting records spurred Castrol Oil chairman Lord Wakefield to sponsor a project to bring the water record to Britain. Famed land speed racer and racing driver Sir Henry Segrave was hired to pilot a new boat, Miss England. Although the boat was not capable of beating Wood's Miss America, the British team did gain experience, which was put into an improved boat. Miss England II was powered by two Rolls-Royce aircraft engines and seemed capable of beating Wood's record.

On 13 June 1930, Segrave piloted Miss England II to a new record of 158.94 km/h (98.8 mph) average speed during two runs on Windermere, in Britain's Lake District. Having set the record, Segrave set off on a third run to try to improve the record further. Unfortunately, the boat flipped during the run, with both Segrave and his co-driver receiving fatal injuries.

Following Segrave's death, Miss England II was salvaged and repaired. Kaye Don was chosen as the new driver for 1931. However, during this time, Gar Wood recaptured the record for the U.S. at 164.41 km/h (102.16 mph). A month later on Lake Garda, Don got the record back with 177.387 km/h (110.2 mph). In February 1932, Wood responded, nudging the mark to 179.779 km/h (111.709 mph).

In response to the continued American challenge, the British team built a new boat, Miss England III. The design was an evolution of the predecessor, with a squared-off stern and twin propellers being the main improvements. Don took the new boat to Loch Lomond, Scotland, on 18 July 1932, improved the record first to 188.985 km/h (117.430 mph), then to 192.816 km/h (119.810 mph) on a second run.

Determined to have the last word over his great rival, Gar Wood built another new Miss America. Miss America X was 12 metres (39 ft) long, powered by four supercharged Packard aeroplane engines. On 20 September 1932 Wood broke the 200 km/h (120 mph) barrier, driving his new boat to 200.943 km/h (124.860 mph). It would prove the end of an era. Don declined to attempt any further records. Wood also opted to scale down his involvement in racing and returned to running his businesses. Somewhat ironically, both record-breakers lived into their 90s. Wood died in 1971, and Don in 1985.

== Boat design changes ==
Wood's last record would be one of the final records for a conventional, single-keel boat. In June 1937 Malcolm Campbell, the world-famous land speed record breaker, drove Blue Bird K3 to a new record of 203.31 km/h (126.33 mph) at Lake Maggiore. Compared to the massive Miss America X, K3 was a much more compact craft. It was 5 metres shorter and had one engine to X's four.

Despite his success, Campbell was unsatisfied with the relatively small increase in speed. He commissioned a new Blue Bird to be built. Blue Bird K4 was a 'three pointer' hydroplane powered by a Rolls Royce 'R' engine. Unlike conventional powerboats, which have a single keel, with an indent, or 'step', cut from the bottom to reduce drag, a hydroplane has a concave base with two sponsons fitted to the front and a third point at the rear of the hull. When the boat increases in speed, most of the hull lifts out of the water and runs on the three contact points. The positive effect is reduced drag; the downside is that the three-pointer is much less stable than the single-keel boat. If the hydroplane's angle of attack is upset at speed, the craft can somersault into the air or nose-dive into the water.

Campbell's new boat was a success. In 1939, on the eve of the Second World War, he took it to Coniston Water and increased his record by 18 km/h (11 mph), to 228.11 km/h (141.74 mph).

== 1940s ==
The return of peace in 1945 brought a new form of power for the record breaker – the jet engine. Campbell immediately renovated Blue Bird K4 with a De Havilland Goblin jet engine. The result was a curious-looking craft whose shoe-like profile led to it being nicknamed 'The Coniston Slipper'. It was unsuccessful because Vosper, who had built the boat, failed to grasp that the thrust line from a jet was much higher up than from a propeller, making the craft unstable at speed. Campbell retired from record attempts and died in 1948.

== 1950s ==
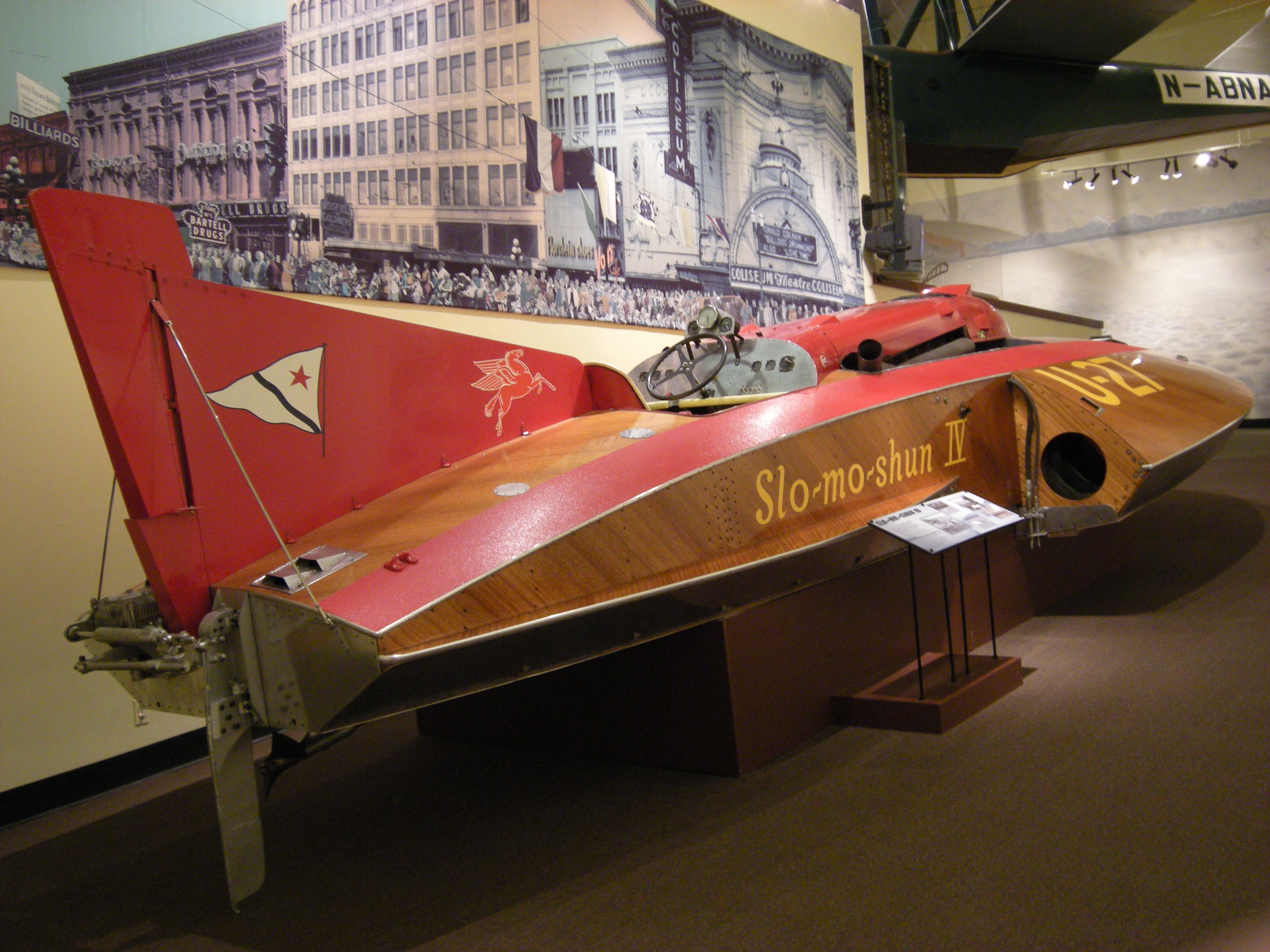
Slo-Mo-Shun IV on display at Seattle's Museum of History and Industry

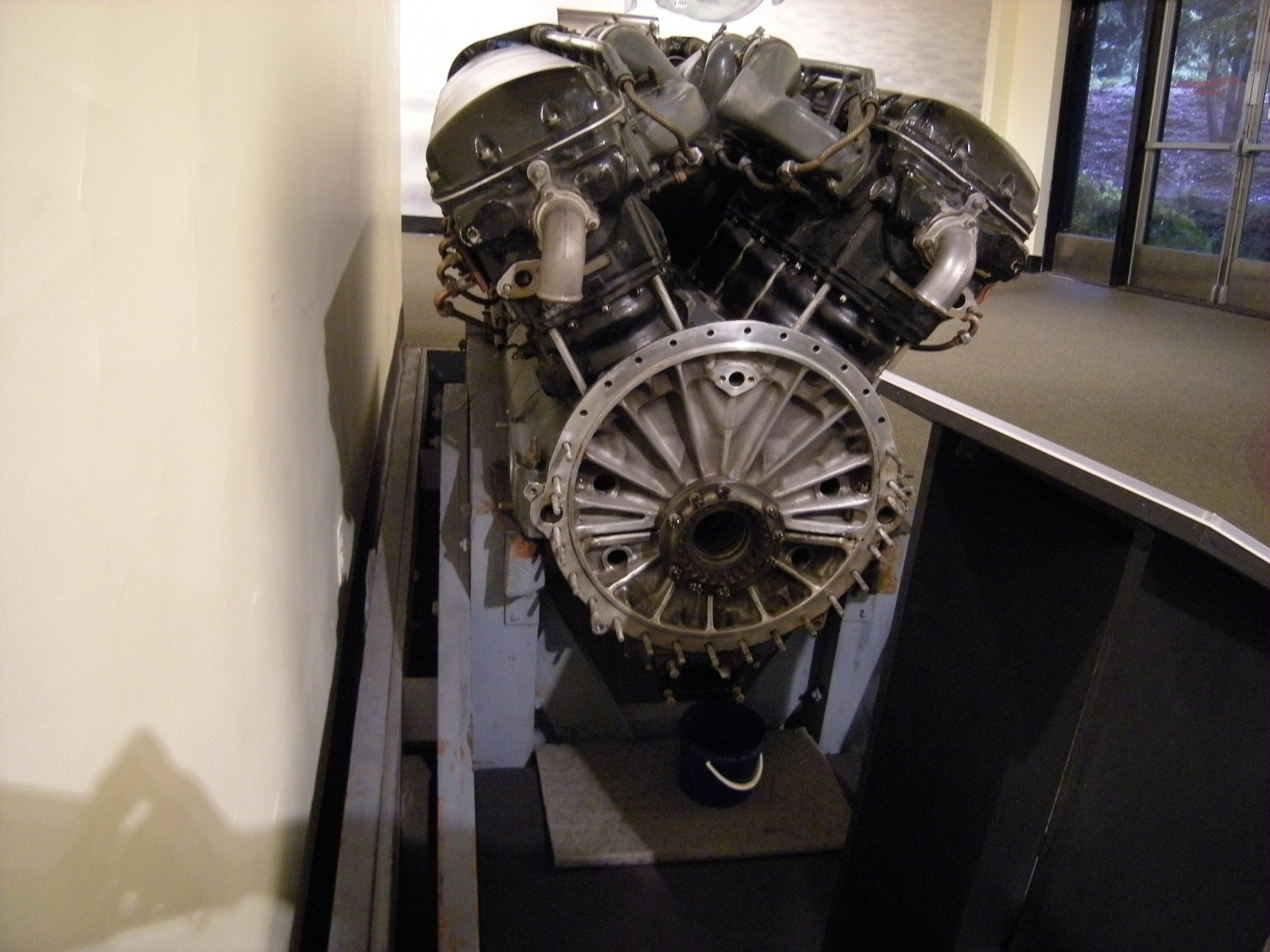
The Allison V-1710 aircraft engine that powered Slo-Mo-Shun IV

On 26 June 1950, Slo-Mo-Shun IV improved on Campbell's record by 29 km/h (18 mph). Powered by an Allison V-1710 aircraft engine, the boat was built by Seattle Chrysler dealer Stanley Sayres and was able to run 260 km/h (160 mph) because her hull was designed to lift the top of the propeller out of water when running at high speed. This phenomenon, called 'prop riding', further reduced drag.

In 1952, Sayres drove Slo-Mo-Shun to 287.25 km/h (178.49 mph), a 29 km/h (18 mph) increase on his previous record.

The renewed American success persuaded Malcolm Campbell's son, Donald, who had already driven Blue Bird K4 (having replaced the jet engine with the original Rolls Royce power unit) within sight of his father's record, to further push for the record. However, Blue Bird K4 was then 12 years old, with a 20-year-old engine, and Campbell struggled to reach the speeds of the Seattle-built boat. In late 1951, it was written off after suffering a structural failure at 270 km/h (170 mph) on Coniston Water.

At this time, yet another land-speed driver entered the fray. Englishman John Cobb was hoping to reach 320 km/h (200 mph) in his jet-powered Crusader. A radical design, the Crusader reversed the 'three-pointer' design, placing the sponsons at the rear of the hull. On 29 September 1952, Cobb tried to beat the world record on Loch Ness but, while travelling at an estimated 338 km/h (210 mph), Crusader's front plane collapsed and the craft instantly disintegrated. Cobb was retrieved from the water but had already died.

Two years later, on 8 October 1954, another man would die trying for the record. Italian textile magnates Mario Verga and Francesco Vitetta, responding to a prize offer of 5 million lire from the Italian Motorboat Federation to any Italian who broke the world record, built a sleek piston-engined hydroplane to claim the record. Named Laura III, after Verga's daughter, the boat was fast but unstable. Travelling across Lake Iseo, in Northern Italy, at close to 306 km/h (190 mph), Verga lost control of Laura III and was thrown out into the water when the boat somersaulted. Like Cobb, he died.

Following Cobb's death, Donald Campbell started working on a new Bluebird, K7, a jet-powered hydroplane. Learning the many lessons from Cobb's ill-starred Crusader, K7 was designed as a classic 3-pointer with sponsons forward alongside the cockpit. She was designed by Ken and Lewis Norris in 1953-54 and was completed in early 1955. She was powered by a Metropolitan-Vickers Beryl turbojet of 16 kN (3,500 lbf) thrust. K7 was of all-metal construction and proved to have extremely high rigidity.

Campbell and K7 set a new record of 325.60 km/h (202.32 mph) on Ullswater in July 1955. Campbell and K7 went on to break the record a further six times over the next nine years in the US and England (Coniston Water), finally increasing it to 444.71 km/h (276.33 mph) at Lake Dumbleyung in Western Australia in 1964. Campbell thus became the most prolific water speed record breaker of all time.

At the time Campbell set the absolute record, the piston-powered propeller-driven record was held by the George Simons' Miss U.S. I at 322.54 km/h (200.42 mph). Roy Duby set this record at Guntersville, Alabama, in 1962 and stood for 38 years.

== 1967 ==
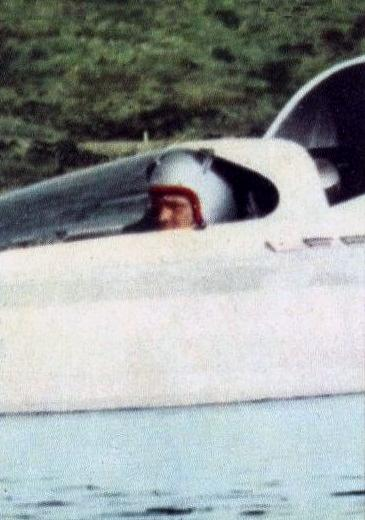
Lee Taylor of the United States reached 285.22 miles per hour (459.02 km/h) in Hustler on Lake Guntersville on 30 June 1967.

Donald Campbell's Bluebird K7 had been re-engined with a Bristol Siddeley Orpheus jet rated at 4,500 lbf (20 kN) of thrust. On 4 January 1967, he tried again. His first run averaged 475.2 km/h (295.3 mph), and a new record seemed in sight. Campbell applied K7's water brake to slow the craft down from her peak speed of 507 km/h (315 mph) clear of the measured kilometre to a speed around 350 km/h (220 mph). Rather than waiting for the lake to settle again before starting the mandatory return leg, Campbell immediately turned around at the end of the lake and began his return run. At around 512 km/h (318 mph), just as she entered the measured kilometre, Bluebird began to lose stability, and 400 m before the end of the kilometre, Bluebird′s nose lifted beyond its critical pitch angle and she started to rise out of the water at a 45-degree angle. The boat took off, somersaulted, and then plunged nose-first into the lake, breaking up as she cartwheeled across the surface. Campbell was killed instantly. Over the next two weeks, prolonged searches discovered the wreck, but it was not until May 2001 that Campbell's body was finally located and recovered. Campbell was buried in the churchyard at Coniston on 12 September 2001. The 1988 television drama Across the Lake recreates the attempt.

Lee Taylor, a California native boat racer in Hustler during a test run on Lake Havasu on 14 April 1964, was unable to shut down the jet and crashed into the lakeside at over 161 km/h (100 mph). Hustler was wrecked, and Taylor was severely injured. He spent the following years recuperating and rebuilding his boat. On 30 June 1967, on Lake Guntersville, Taylor and Hustler tried for the record. Still, the wake of some spectators' boats disturbed the water, forcing Taylor to slow down his second run, and he came up 3.2 km/h (2 mph) short. He tried again the same day and set a new record of 459 km/h (285 mph).

== 1977 and 1978 ==
Until 20 November 1977, every official water speed record had been set by an American, Canadian, Irishman, or Briton. That day Ken Warby became the first Australian holder when he piloted his Spirit of Australia to 464.46 km/h (288.6 mph; 250.8 kn) to beat Lee Taylor's record. Warby, who had built the craft in his backyard, used the publicity to find sponsorship to pay for improvements to the Spirit. On 8 October 1978 Warby travelled to Blowering Dam, Australia, and broke both the 300 mph (483 km/h; 261 kn) and 500.0 km/h (311 mph; 270 kn) barriers with an average speed of 511.11 km/h (317.59 mph; 275.98 kn). As he exited the course, his peak speed as measured on a radar gun was approximately 555 km/h (345 mph; 300 kn).

Warby's record still stands. There have only been two official attempts to break it, both resulting in the driver's death.

== 1980s ==
Lee Taylor tried to get the record back in 1980. Inspired by the land speed record cars Blue Flame and Budweiser Rocket, he built a rocket-powered boat, Discovery II. The 40-foot (12 m) long craft was a reverse three-point design, similar to John Cobb's Crusader, but of much greater length.

Originally, Taylor tested the boat on Walker Lake in Nevada, but his backers demanded a more accessible location, so he switched to Lake Tahoe. An attempt was set for 13 November 1980, but when conditions on the lake proved unfavourable, he decided against trying for the record. Not wanting to disappoint the assembled spectators and media, he did a test run instead. At 432 km/h (270 mph) Discovery II started to become unstable. It has been speculated that it may have hit a swell.. Its unstable lateral oscillations caused the left sponson to collapse, sending the boat plunging into the water. The cockpit section with Taylor's body was recovered three days later. The cockpit had not floated as intended, and Taylor had drowned.

On 9 July 1989, Craig Arfons, son of Walt Arfons, builder of the world's first jet car, and nephew of record breaker Art Arfons, tried for the record in his all-composite fiberglass and Kevlar Rain-X Challenger. At 7:07 am, less than 15 seconds into his run, the hydroplane somersaulted at more than 350 mph (560 km/h).

The cockpit remained intact underwater with Arfons remaining inside upside down. Two divers from a rescue team reached the wreckage and extracted him within three minutes of the initial incident. While he still had a pulse after cardiopulmonary resuscitation was administered, he did not respond to the medical personnel. He was taken to the Highlands Regional Medical Center but was pronounced dead at 8:30 am, 1 hour and 23 minutes after the initial incident.

== Current projects ==
Despite the high fatality rate, the record is still coveted by boat enthusiasts and racers. Ongoing projects aimed at breaking the record include the following:

=== Quicksilver ===
The British Quicksilver project is managed by Nigel Macknight. The design was initially based on concepts for a rear-sponsoned configuration by Ken Norris, who had worked with the Campbells on their 'Bluebird' designs. The design is of modular construction with the main body consisting of a front section with a steel spaceframe incorporating the engine, a Rolls-Royce Spey Mk.101, and the rear section a monocoque extending to the tail. The front sponsons are also modules, one of which contains the driver.

=== Spirit of Australia II ===
Ken Warby, now working with his son David, began build on a new boat powered by a jet engine from a Fiat G.91 to break the record. The team conducting a series of trials had, as of 31 August 2019, increased the speed to 407 km/h. Earlier in 2003, Ken Warby had built another boat, Aussie Spirit, for a record attempt.

Ken Warby died in February 2023, with the project, now solely led by David Warby, conducting test runs that May and September at Blowering Dam, with further runs planned in November that year. Test runs are continuing as of October 2024, according to David Warby. Latest trials in November 2025 have seen the boat reach a speed of 450 km/h.

=== Dartagnan SP600 ===
Daniel Dehaemers was the Belgian challenger for the absolute water speed record. The SP600 is of full carbon composite construction. It is powered by a Rolls-Royce Adour 104 turbojet engine. The boat was planned to be tested in 2016. However, after finishing building the boat, he died of cancer in 2018 before he managed to trial the craft.

Alençon Jos restarted the project in 2019 with an expected engine test in 2020.

=== LONGBOW ===
A British team, with a serving British military pilot at the helm, are working together to build and run Longbow, a jet hydroplane, on lakes and lochs within the UK, for a British attempt at the water speed record.

=== Thrust WSH ===
Richard Noble, engineer behind the Thrust series of land speed record cars Thrust2 which he drove, and ThrustSSC, the supersonic Land Speed Record holder since 1997, announced on a YouTube video 27 May 2022 that his group intends to construct a water speed record boat, named ThrustWSH (Water Speed Hydroplane), conforming to the naming custom of ThrustSSC (Supersonic Car).

== Record holders ==
Speed	Craft	Captain(s)	Location	Date
317.59 mph (511.11 km/h)	Spirit of Australia	(Australia) Ken Warby	Blowering Reservoir	8 October 1978
288.60 mph (464.46 km/h)	Spirit of Australia	(Australia) Ken Warby	Blowering Reservoir	20 November 1977
285.22 mph (459.02 km/h)	Hustler	(United States) Lee Taylor	Lake Guntersville	30 June 1967
276.33 mph (444.71 km/h)	Bluebird K7	(United Kingdom) Donald Campbell	Lake Dumbleyung	31 December 1964
260.35 mph (418.99 km/h)	Bluebird K7	(United Kingdom) Donald Campbell	Coniston Water	14 May 1959
248.62 mph (400.12 km/h)	Bluebird K7	(United Kingdom) Donald Campbell	Coniston Water	10 November 1958
239.07 mph (384.75 km/h)	Bluebird K7	(United Kingdom) Donald Campbell	Coniston Water	7 November 1957
225.63 mph (363.12 km/h)	Bluebird K7	(United Kingdom) Donald Campbell	Coniston Water	19 September 1956
216.20 mph (347.94 km/h)	Bluebird K7	(United Kingdom) Donald Campbell	Lake Mead	16 November 1955
202.32 mph (325.60 km/h)	Bluebird K7	(United Kingdom) Donald Campbell	Ullswater	23 July 1955
178.497 mph (287.263 km/h)	Slo-Mo-Shun IV	(United States) Stanley Sayres, Elmer Leninschmidt	Lake Washington	7 July 1952
160.323 mph (258.015 km/h)	Slo-Mo-Shun IV	(United States) Stanley Sayres, Ted O. Jones	Lake Washington	26 June 1950
141.74 mph (228.11 km/h)	Blue Bird K4	(United Kingdom) Malcolm Campbell	Coniston Water	19 August 1939
130.91 mph (210.68 km/h)	Blue Bird K3	(United Kingdom) Malcolm Campbell	Hallwilersee	17 September 1938
129.50 mph (208.41 km/h)	Blue Bird K3	(United Kingdom) Malcolm Campbell	Lake Maggiore	2 September 1937
126.32 mph (203.29 km/h)	Blue Bird K3	(United Kingdom) Malcolm Campbell	Lake Maggiore	1 September 1937
124.86 mph (200.94 km/h)	Miss America X	(United States) Garfield Wood	St. Clair River	20 September 1932
119.81 mph (192.82 km/h)	Miss England III	(Republic of Ireland) Kaye Don	Loch Lomond	18 July 1932
117 mph (188 km/h)	Miss England III	(Republic of Ireland) Kaye Don	Loch Lomond	18 July 1932
111.712 mph (179.783 km/h)	Miss America IX	(United States) Garfield Wood	Indian Creek	5 February 1932
110.223 mph (177.387 km/h)	Miss England II	(Republic of Ireland) Kaye Don	Lake Garda	31 July 1931
103.49 mph (166.55 km/h)	Miss England II	(Republic of Ireland) Kaye Don	Paraná River	15 April 1931
102.256 mph (164.565 km/h)	Miss America IX	(United States) Garfield Wood	Indian Creek	20 March 1931
98.760 mph (158.939 km/h)	Miss England II	(United Kingdom) Henry Segrave	Windermere	13 June 1930
93.123 mph (149.867 km/h)	Miss America VII	(United States) Garfield Wood	Indian Creek	23 March 1929
92.838 mph (149.408 km/h)	Miss America VII	(United States) George Wood	Detroit River	4 September 1928
87.392 mph (140.644 km/h)	Farman Hydroglider	(United States) Jules Fisher	River Seine	10 November 1924
80.567 mph (129.660 km/h)	Miss America II	(United States) Garfield Wood	Detroit River	6 September 1921
71.43 mph (114.96 km/h)	Miss America	(United States) Garfield Wood	Detroit River	15 September 1920
70.86 mph (114.04 km/h)	HD-4	(Canada) Casey Baldwin	Bras d'Or Lake	19 September 1919
57 mph (92 km/h)	The Maple Leaf III	(United Kingdom) Sir Edward Mackay Edgar	The Solent	March 1911

== See also ==
- Blue Riband
- Speed sailing record
- List of vehicle speed records
- World Sailing Speed Record Council
