= Hydroplane racing =

Sport involving racing hydroplanes on lakes and rivers

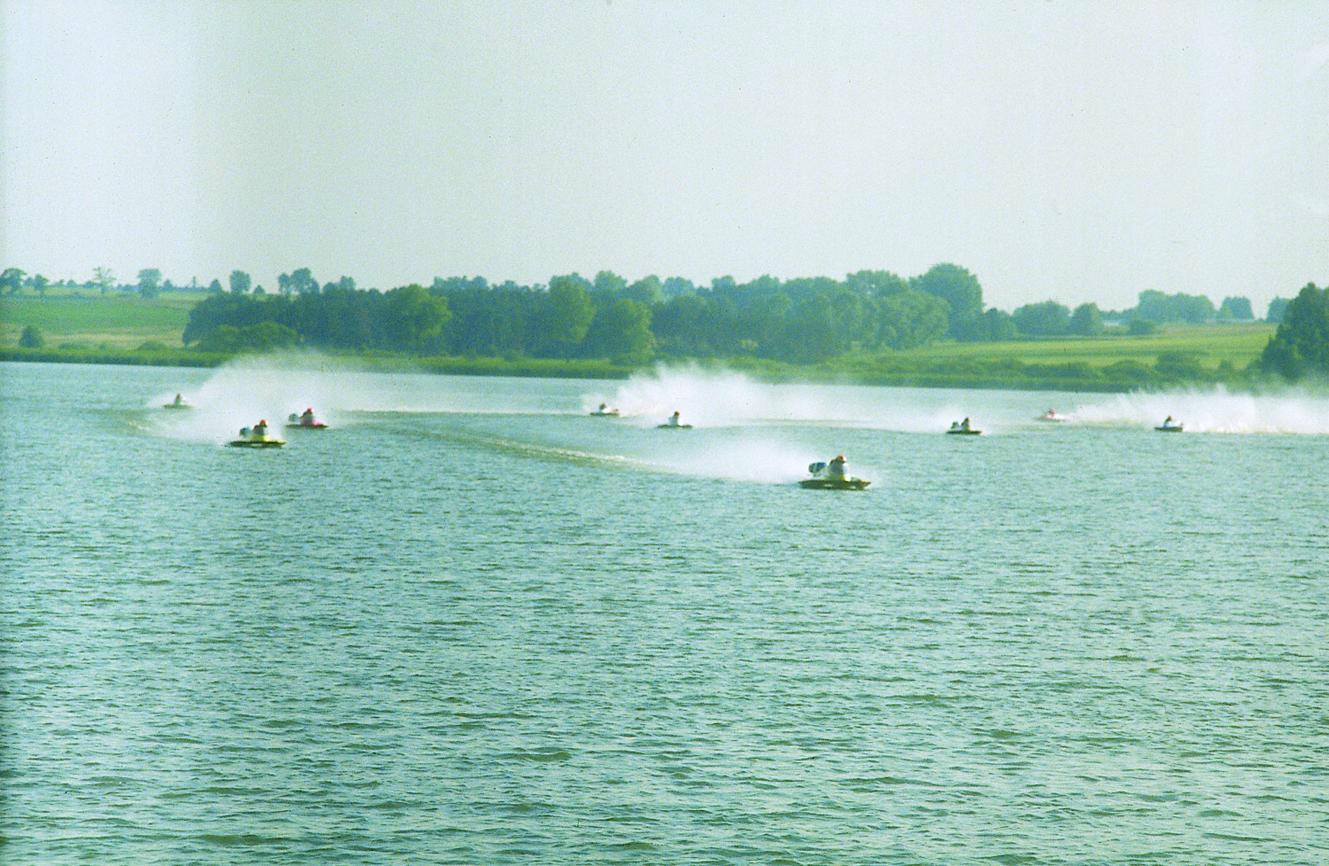
European Motorboat Championship in Żnin (Poland)

Hydroplane racing (also known as hydro racing) is a sport involving racing hydroplanes on lakes, rivers, and bays.

== Racing circuits ==
=== International professional outboard hydroplane racing ===
The Union Internationale Motonautique (or "UIM", headquartered in Europe) sanctions many different hydroplane categories of hydroplane powerboat racing. International UIM F-125, F-250, F-350 and F-500 Circuit powerboat races are very popular in Europe, Asia, and the United States. UIM's O-series hydroplane Formula Circuit racing events are some of the most prestigious Professional Racing Outboard (PRO) hydroplane events in the world. National powerboat racing teams compete for national and international titles in these hydroplane racing circuits. The American Power Boat Association (APBA) sanction similar PRO class national title events in the United States. Professional F-series World Cup Title powerboat races are held at Europe, United States, and western Asia race site locations every year. Equivalent APBA PRO classes are 125ccH (UIM O-125), 175ccH (UIM O-175), 250ccH (UIM O-250), 350ccH (UIM O-350), 500ccH (UIM O-500), 750ccH (APBA only), and 1000ccH classes. PRO classes using 500cc and larger displacement racing motors must be equipped with an enclosed re-enforced capsule, a certified racing harness restraint system, and a self-contained oxygen system for the driver. The faster classes of PRO hydroplanes (with straightaway speeds from around 75 to 120 miles per hour) use 2-cycle outboard motors running highly filtered methanol race fuel mixed with a pure castor or synthetic castor-based lubricating oil. All methanol-fueled and gasoline-fueled PRO racing outboard motors are direct drive (no gear reduction) and equipped with high performance, motorcycle racing style magneto ignition and carburetor systems. 125cc through 1000cc PRO series hydroplanes are not entry level classes in outboard powerboat racing. Investment costs are moderately high compared to similar APBA stock and modified outboard racing classes. K-PRO (an APBA entry class) is the only PRO hydroplane class running modified, recreational outboard motors; all other PRO hydroplane classes use 2-stroke outboard motors designed and manufactured specifically for PRO circuit racing purposes. Entry level classes for the PRO series classes are gasoline-fueled K-PRO (APBA sanctions only) and OSY-400 (sanctioned by both UIM and APBA.) International UIM teams have a formal crew that usually consists of family members, motor mechanic, hull builder sponsor, and owner/driver team in order to be successful at racing international F-125 through F-500 Circuit hydroplanes. Some hydroplane hull builders sponsor more than one team in a formula series circuit. PRO outboard hydroplane hulls are constructed with lightweight wood, composite, and hybrid (wood/composite/aluminum) materials. Outboard Performance Craft hydroplanes (sometimes called "tunnel boats") are a different racing series of UIM and APBA outboard powerboat classes. Limited hydroplane racing classes are inboard-engine powered boats that use high performance gasoline fuel.

=== Grand Prix hydroplane racing ===
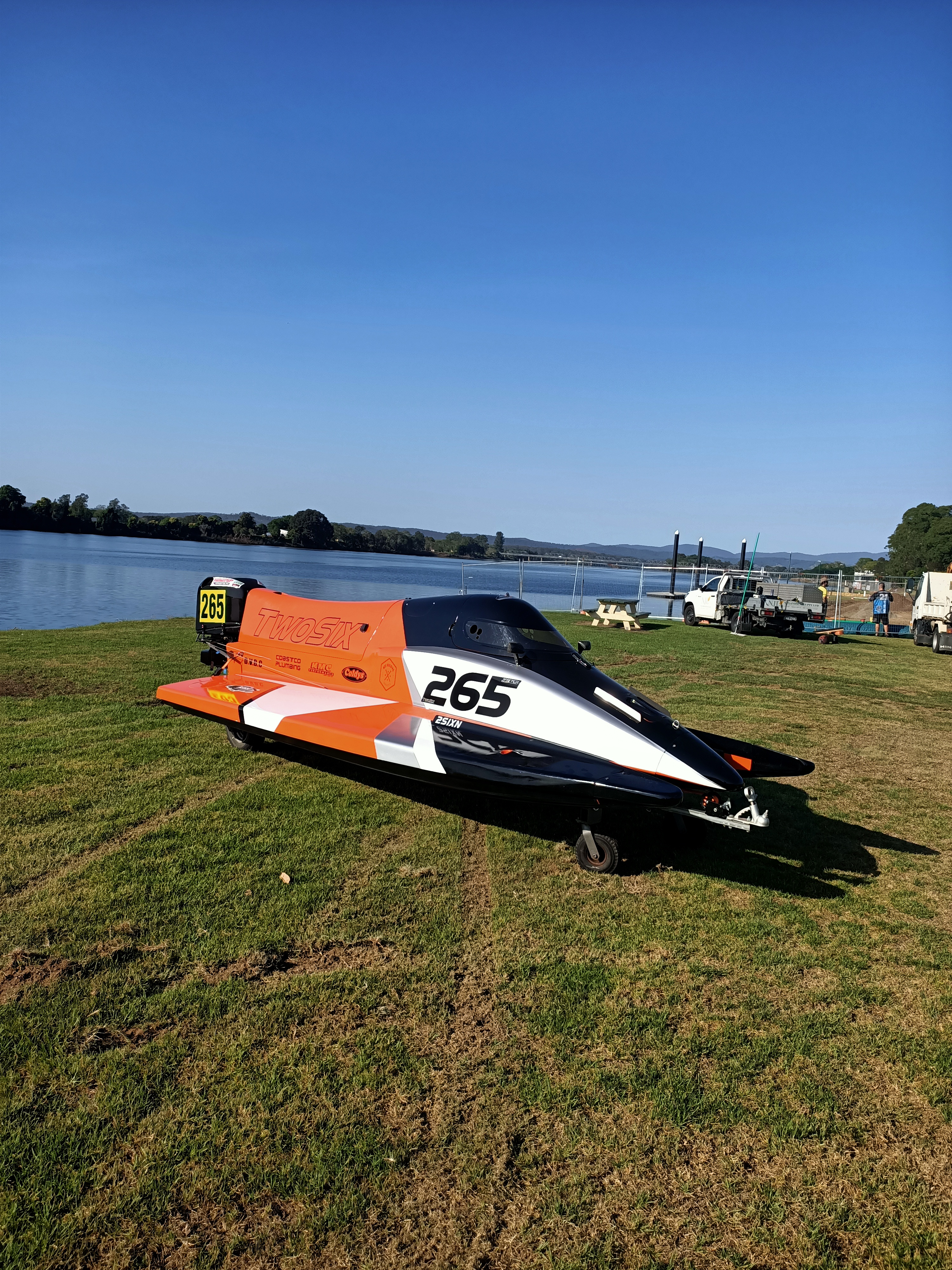
A hydroplane on the grass before a race at the 2025 Australian Formula Powerboat Grand Prix

Grand Prix (GP) is a class of boats featuring supercharged big-block V8 piston engines producing as much as 1,500 horsepower. The 23- to 26-foot craft are fast—routinely attaining speeds in excess of 170 miles per hour (273.5 km/h) in the straights. This class of boat races in the United States, Canada, Australia and New Zealand.

=== Unlimited hydroplane racing ===
Unlimited hydroplanes have much fewer restrictions than with limited hydroplane racing. These 30 foot, 6,800 lbs boats most often powered by a Lycoming T55-L7 turbine engine (used from the Vietnam era to the present day in the CH-47 Chinook military helicopter), which is capable of up to 3000 horsepower with current restrictions. The T55-L7 powerplant creates high speed rotational energy, which is transferred through a gearbox at around 50% gear reduction to reduce propeller RPM. Unlimited hydroplanes are capable of speeds of 200+ mph on the straightaways and qualifying average lap speeds range from 130–165 mph. Modern hulls are constructed of composite materials such as honeycomb aluminum, fiberglass, laminated resin and carbon fiber. Many of the restored, fully operable unlimited hydroplanes at the Hydroplane & Raceboat Museum in Kent, Washington (such as the Miss Wahoo and Miss Thriftway vintage restorations) still use piston-powered inline aircraft engines. The primary racing circuit for unlimited racing is the H1 Unlimited, whose season runs from mid-February through September, consisting of five races. H1 Unlimited races occur throughout the United States, and the Middle East.

=== Stock and modified outboard racing ===
Stock Outboard Racing uses both hydroplane and runabout or monoplane hulls with racing engines that use a service outboard powerhead and a racing lower unit with a direct drive (i.e. start in gear, no gear reduction). Racing in this form ranges from classes designated as follows: A Class, B Class, C Class and D Class. There is also a Junior or "J" Class for kids between the ages of 9 and 16 years of age. The engine sizes range from 9.9 horsepower (7.4 kW) to 50 horsepower (37 kW) with speeds from 30 miles per hour (48 km/h) to 90 miles per hour (140 km/h). In the C Stock Class, the Yamato Motor Company engines used in Kyōtei boat racing (with parimutuel betting) in Japan, are reconditioned, shipped to the United States and used for racing in these classes.

Modified Outboard Hydroplane Racing classes are powered by modified stock outboard class motors. Motor modifications are limited to strict motor specifications and equipment alterations defined and published in APBA category rule books for these outboard hydroplane racing classes. Both stock and modified outboard classes run on a circular or triangular race course using a 3-minute "milling warm-up" period before a "flying" clock start. Heats usually consist of three laps around a closed race course. Drivers are disqualified if they cross the starting line before the official heat's clock start time (called "jumping the gun".) Just like the Stock & PRO hydroplane racing categories of APBA, the Modified hydroplane racing category membership has its own governing powerboat racing committee and rules book.

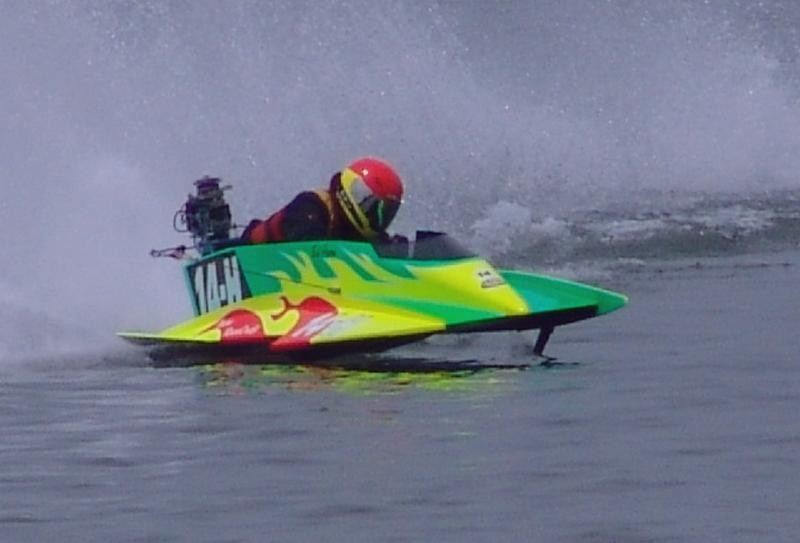
Class B Stock Hydroplane

== Safety improvements ==
In the early days of hydroplane racing, accidents, and even the deaths of drivers, were considered somewhat routine (which was also the case on most early motor racing). As top speeds increased, more attention was paid to driver safety, much like with driver safety programs being instituted in most motor racing series today, such as NASCAR, Formula One, INDYCAR, Grand Prix motorcycle racing, and others. Governing UIM and APBA powerboat racing organizations have promoted and specified many modern technology safety measures and rules for international hydroplane racing. Modern safety technology applications like composite fiber re-enforced Kevlar cockpits, capsule-enclosed driver modules with improved safety harness systems (in PRO, OPC, and limited/unlimited inboard hydroplanes), flip-over incident escape hatches & engine shut-off features, oxygen system & aircraft-quality windscreen canopies for capsule hulls, and advanced ballistic impact-resistant suits with improved helmet/neck brace wear—all of these improvements making the boats and specialized personal protection gear safer for the present-day driver. The HANS device, developed by sportscar racer Jim Downing, has become mandatory in many classes, and future advanced head and spine protection applications (driver upper body control & stabilization during high G-force events) are being tested in future hydroplane capsule designs.

== Notable figures ==
=== Current unlimited hydroplane drivers ===
- Jimmy Shane
- Jeff Bernard
- Dave Villwock

=== Notable unlimited hydroplanes—present and past ===
Present

- Miss Madison

Past

- Pride of Pay N Pak
- Miss Budweiser
- Miss Bardahl
- Miss Thriftway
- Gale V
- Miss Supertest III

=== Notable former unlimited hydroplane owners (O) and drivers (D) ===
- Stanley Sayres O
- Bernie Little O
- Chip Hanauer D
- Ron Musson D
- Ole Bardahl O
- Bill Muncey D & O
- Guy Lombardo D & O
- Dean Chenoweth D
- Gar Wood D & O

== See also ==
- Motorboat racing
- Kyōtei – parimutuel hydroplane boat races in Japan and South Korea
