= Kyōtei =

Motorboat racing event

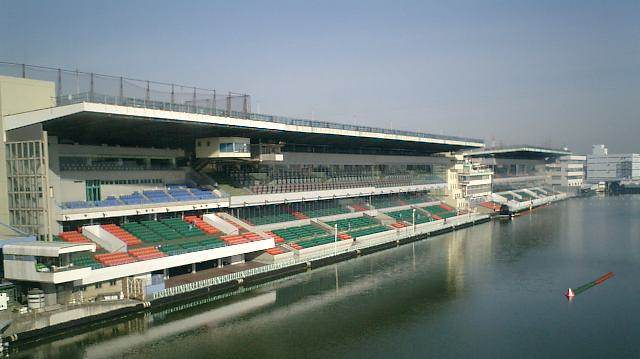
A BOAT RACE (kyōtei) course at Suminoe, Osaka.

Edogawa BOAT RACE

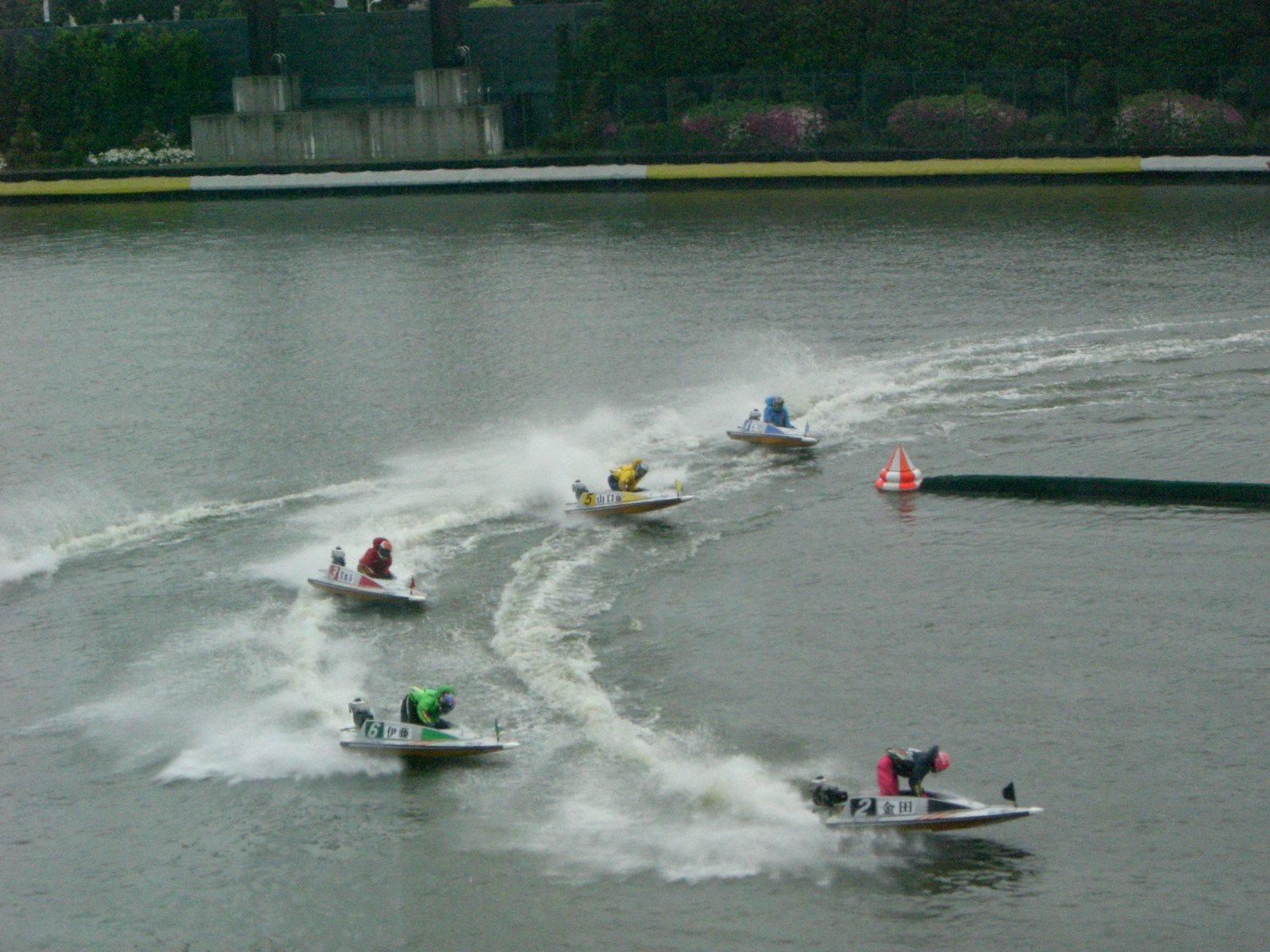
BOAT RACE competitors fly around the corner at Suminoe.

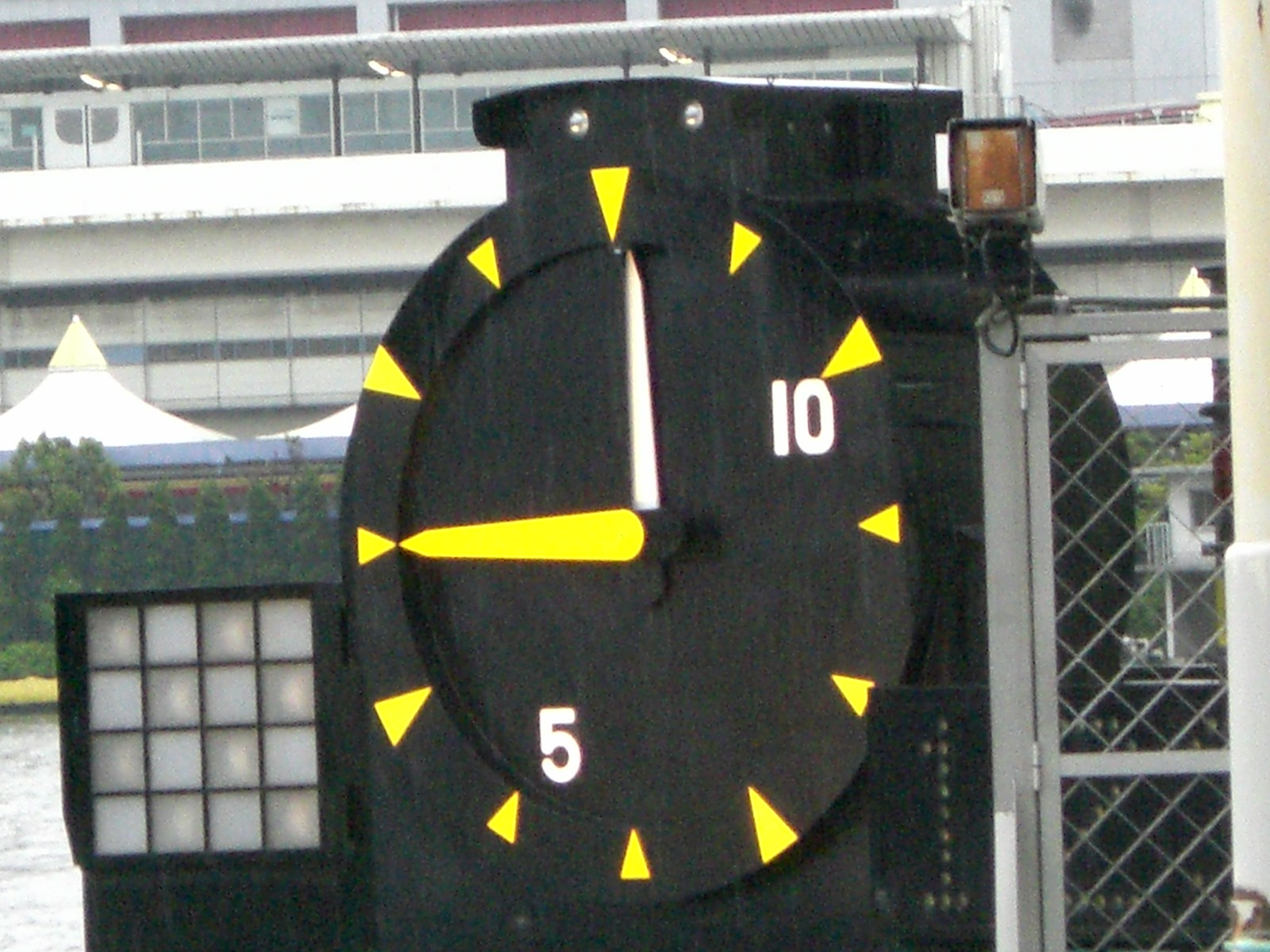
A large clock is used to count down to the start of each race.

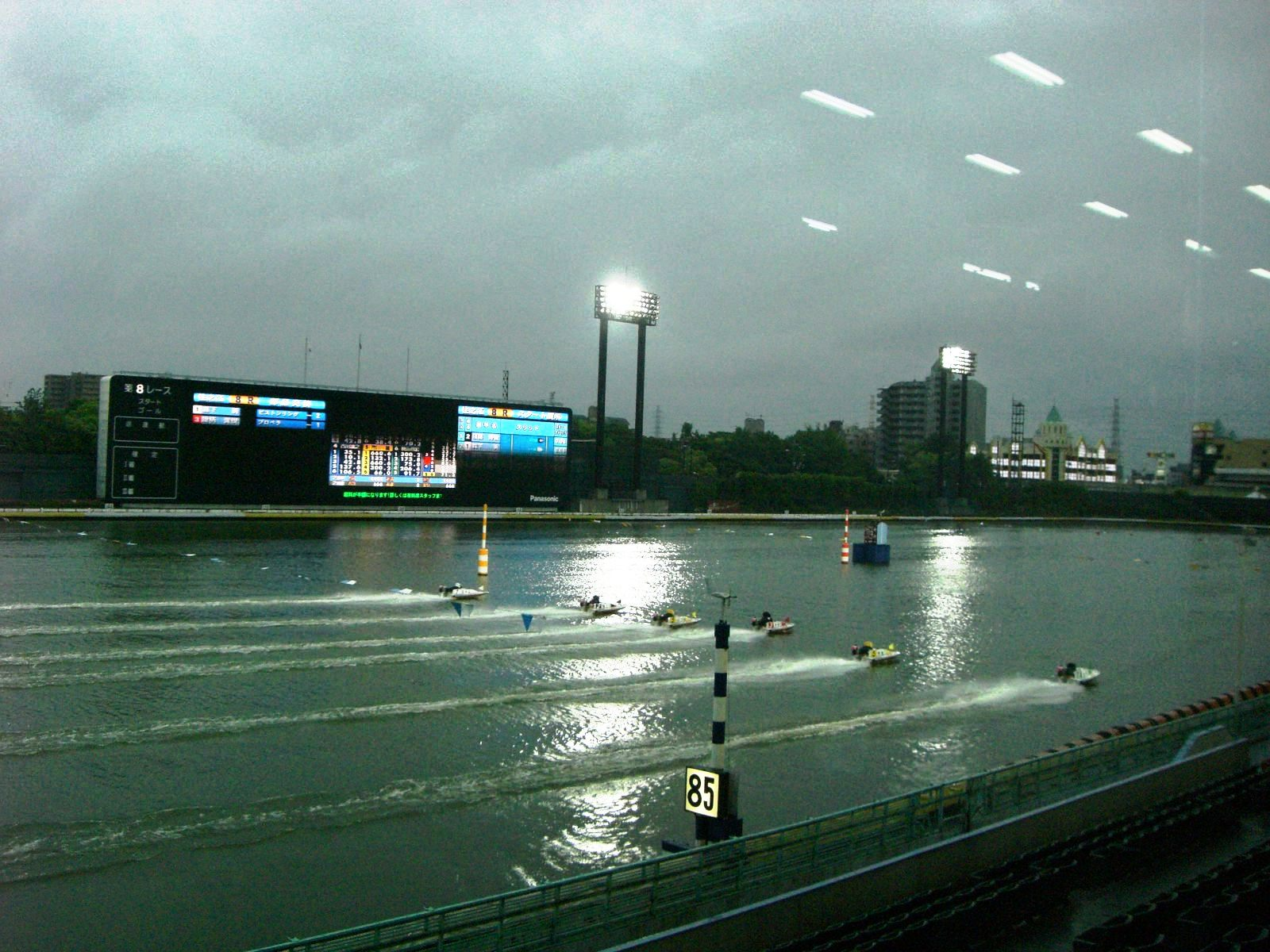
A night BOAT RACE at Suminoe.

The Kyōtei (競艇), literally "boat racing" and referred to as BOAT RACE, is a runabout racing event primary held in Japan. It is one of Japan's four "Public Sports" (公営競技, kōei kyōgi), which are sports events where parimutuel betting is legal.

Kyōtei was introduced in Japan in April 1952, when the first race was held at Ōmura Kyōtei Stadium in Ōmura City, Nagasaki Prefecture.

In April 2010, to promote the sport to a wide variety of people as well as internationally, the Kyotei Promotion Association began referring to the sport as BOAT RACE, and the organization itself was renamed the BOAT RACE Promotion Association. There are 24 kyōtei stadiums in Japan, all of which refer to themselves as BOAT RACE courses.

== Kyōtei races ==
A Kyōtei race is conducted on man-made lakes with a 600-meter oval boat course. Six boats race three laps around the course (1,800 meters). Races are generally over in about two minutes.

Kyōtei employs the flying start system of beginning races. Once competitors receive the signal to pit-out of the docks, they will maneuver their boats in an effort to secure a starting position while a large clock situated at the start/finish line begins a one-minute countdown. Starting positions are usually established with 30 seconds before the clock reaches zero, and with about 12 seconds remaining the boats begin to race up towards the start line at full speed. Boats must cross the start line within one second after the clock reaches zero. Unlike typical powerboat racing, where if a boat crosses the line too early, there is a time penalty added to the offending boat, in Kyōtei, crossing too early - called a false start (フライングスタート, furaingu sutāto; "Flying Start") or crossing too late - called a "Late Start" (出遅れ, deokure), is an automatic scratch and bets on that boat are refunded, with the boat officially excluded from the race. The Japanese term for this exclusion is "return absence" (返還欠場, henkan ketsujō). In a sense, the flying start system can be compared to the mobile start used in harness racing.

Once a race begins, boats fight for the best position entering the first turn marker. Race winners are often decided on the very first turn of the race. The first boat across the line after three laps is the winner, with the first three finishers deciding the payouts for bets.

If a boat causes interference with another boat, is involved in an accident or becomes disabled, the boat is disqualified (失格, shikkaku). No refunds are given for disqualified boats, unless all boats are disqualified for some reason, unlike if a boat is scratched for missing the start too early or too late.

Prior to the start of a race, competitors conduct a practice start and run a few laps around the course to practice their straight runs and cornering. These ensure that their boats are functioning properly, and also provide the betting public with useful information. During the practice, a straight run of 150 meters is timed for each boat and announced to the public. Also, competitors are not penalized for false or late starts during the practice run.

Competitors are assigned an engine and a boat at random to use for race day. Competitors can tune their own engines between the exhibition run and the race. Engines are specification from Yamoto Motor in Ota, with boat specifications similar to the OSY-400 class (known in APBA as C Stock Hydro for their amateur classes). The current model engine is a twin-cylinder 397 cc engine weighing 41.5 kilograms (91 lb), making 32 horsepower at 6,600 RPM. Engines are used for only one year, after which they are rebuilt and sold for amateur and professional OSY-400 and C Stock Hydro races.

Similar to other water and land-based motorsport where a minimum dry weight requirement includes the driver, rules require men to weigh in at 50 kg or more, while women must weigh in at 47 kg or more. If any competitor is short of the minimum weight, their boat will be loaded with additional ballast weight to compensate.

== Competitors ==
Each racer involved in Kyōtei is assigned a rank. From the top down, the ranks are A1, A2, B1 and B2. Drivers face promotion and relegation every six months. Performance over the time frame will determine of the competitor is promoted or relegated, or retain their rank. Racers in the higher A classes are permitted to compete in more races more often.

Each tournament carries one of five designations: SG (Special Grade), G1, G2, G3 and General. SG races are held around eight times a year and are only open to the highest A1 kyōtei competitors. The last major tournament of the year, the Grand Prix, determines the annual champion in terms of prize money won.

A unique aspect of the sport is the fact that women can compete as equals with men. As the weights of racers make an important difference in hydroplane racing, female racers, often lighter than their male counterparts, have certain advantages. Roughly 10% of Kyōtei racers are women.

Training of Kyōtei competitors is carried out at the Yamato Kyōtei School (now the Boat Racer Training School) in Yanagawa City, Fukuoka Prefecture.

== See also ==
- Gambling in Japan
- Nippon Foundation, which oversees the income from Kyōtei.
- Hydroplane racing
- Monkey Turn: A manga by Katsutoshi Kawai, later adapted into anime.
