= Blowering Dam =

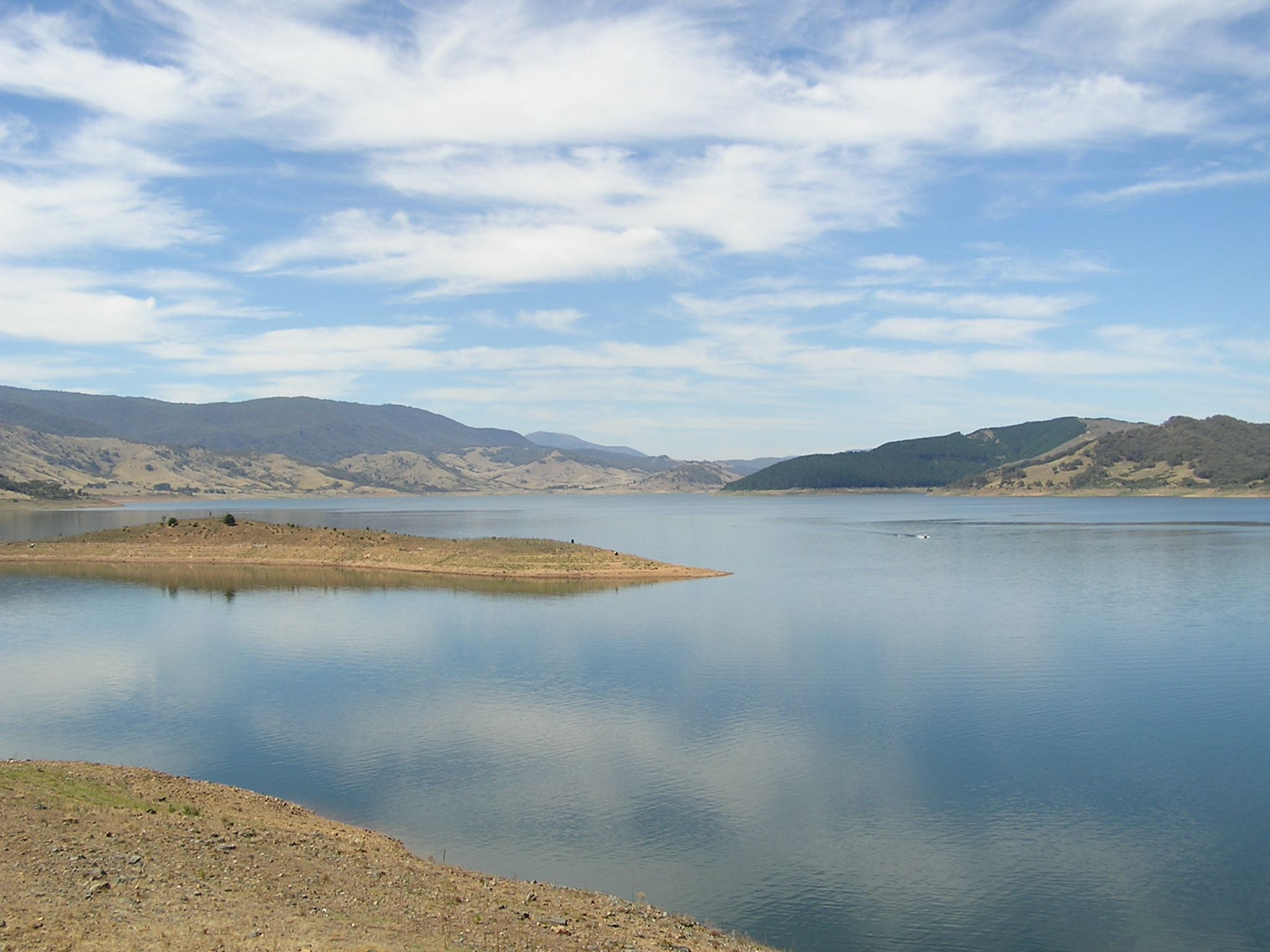
- Blowering Dam, in 2006.

- Location of the Blowering Dam in New South Wales
- Country: Australia
- Location: Snowy Mountains, New South Wales
- Coordinates: 35°24′05″S 148°14′52″E
- Status: Operational
- Construction began: 1962
- Opening date: 1968
- Owner: Australia State Water Corporation

Dam and spillways
- Type of dam: Embankment dam
- Impounds: Tumut River
- Height: 114 metres (374 ft)
- Length: 747 metres (2,451 ft)
- Dam volume: 8,563 cubic metres (302,400 cu ft)
- Spillways: 1
- Spillway type: Concrete chute
- Spillway capacity: 2,360 cubic metres per second (83,000 cu ft/s)

Reservoir
- Creates: Blowering Reservoir
- Total capacity: 1,628 gigalitres (5.75×10^{10} cu ft)
- Catchment area: 1,606 square kilometres (620 sq mi)
- Surface area: 44.6 square kilometres (17.2 sq mi)
- Maximum water depth: 91 metres (299 ft)

Power Station
- Operator: Snowy Hydro
- Commission date: 1969
- Hydraulic head: 86.6 metres (284 ft)
- Turbines: 1
- Installed capacity: 80 megawatts (110,000 hp)
- Website; Blowering Dam

The Blowering Dam is a major ungated rock fill with clay core embankment dam with concrete chute spillway impounding a reservoir under the same name. It is located on the Tumut River upstream of Tumut in the Snowy Mountains region of New South Wales, Australia. Purposes for the dam include flood mitigation, hydro-power, irrigation, water supply and conservation. The dam is part of the Snowy Mountains Scheme, a vast hydroelectricity and irrigation complex constructed in south-east Australia between 1949 and 1974 and now run by Snowy Hydro.

== Location and features ==
Commenced in 1964, completed in 1968, and upgraded in 2010, the Blowering Dam is a major ungated dam, located approximately 13 kilometres (8.1 mi) south of Tumut. The dam was built by consortium including Morrison, Knudsen, Utah and Mcdonald on behalf of the New South Wales Department of Land and Water Conservation for town water supplies, river flows and domestic requirements, irrigated agriculture, industry, flood mitigation and environmental flows. Together with releases from Burrinjuck Dam, on the Murrumbidgee River, Blowering Dam also provides a regulated flow of water for the Coleambally and Murrumbidgee Irrigation Areas.

The dam wall constructed with 8,563 cubic metres (302,400 cu ft) of rock fill with clay core is 112 metres (367 ft) high and 808 metres (2,651 ft) long. The maximum water depth is 91 metres (299 ft) and at 100% capacity the dam wall holds back 1,628,000 megalitres (57,500×10^{6} cu ft) of water at 379 metres (1,243 ft) AHD. The surface area of the Blowering Reservoir is 44.6 square kilometres (17.2 sq mi) and the catchment area is 1,606 square kilometres (620 sq mi). The uncontrolled concrete chute spillway is capable of discharging 2,350 cubic metres per second (83,000 cu ft/s).

A A$33 million upgrade of facilities was completed between 2009 and 2012, and involved the construction of a parapet wall on top of the dam wall crest and raising the spillway training walls. The addition of the parapet wall increased the crest height to 114 metres (374 ft). Storage capacity and water releases from the dam were not altered by the upgrade.

=== Power generation ===
The dam houses a hydroelectric power station and has one turbine generator, with a generating capacity of 80 megawatts (110,000 hp) of electricity; with a net generation of 260 gigawatt-hours (940 TJ) per annum. The power station has 86.6 metres (284 ft) rated hydraulic head.

== Recreation ==
In 1978, Ken Warby set the water speed record of 511 kilometres per hour (318 mph) on Blowering Reservoir - a record that still stands.

== Gallery ==
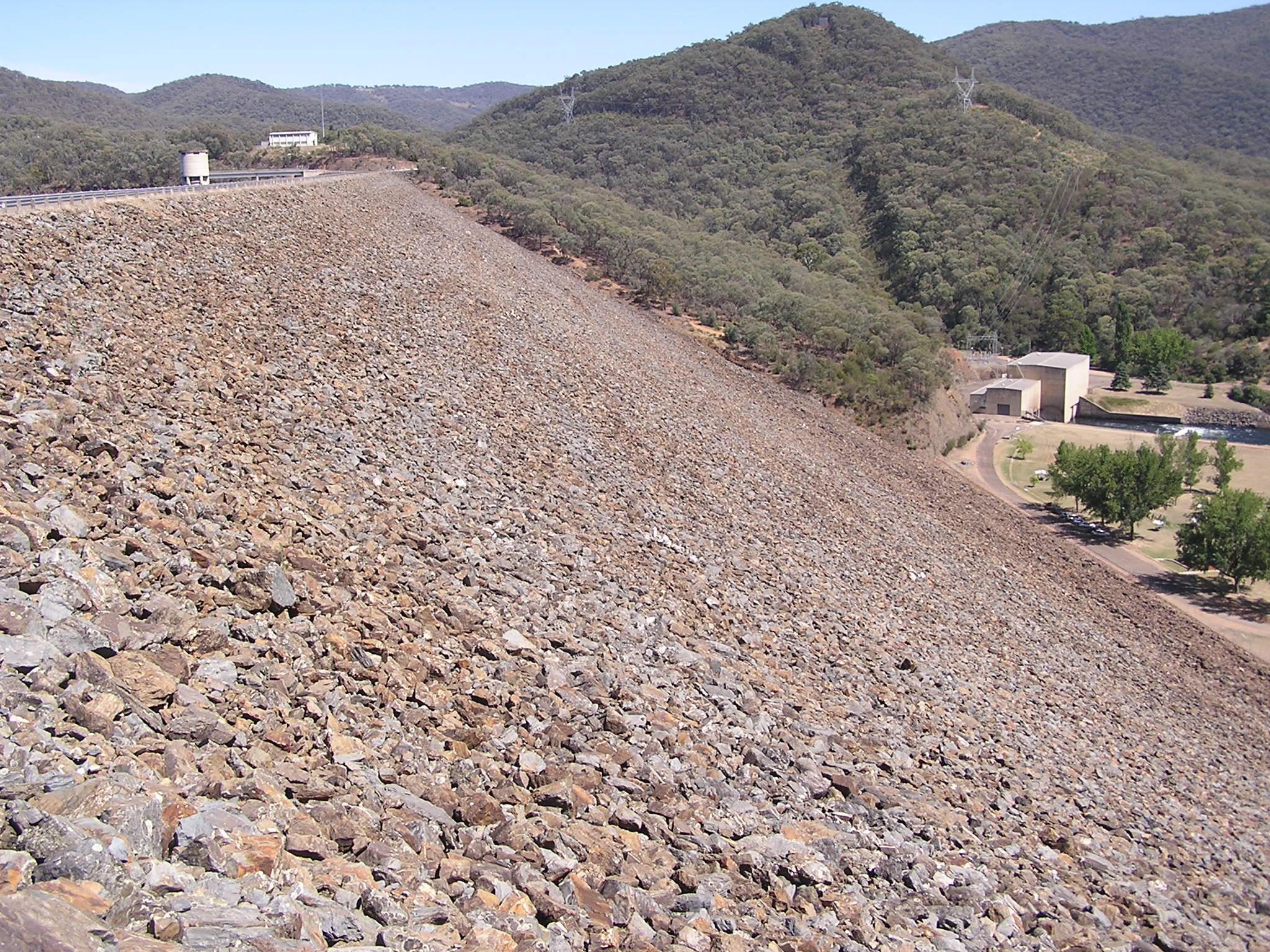
Blowering Dam wall.

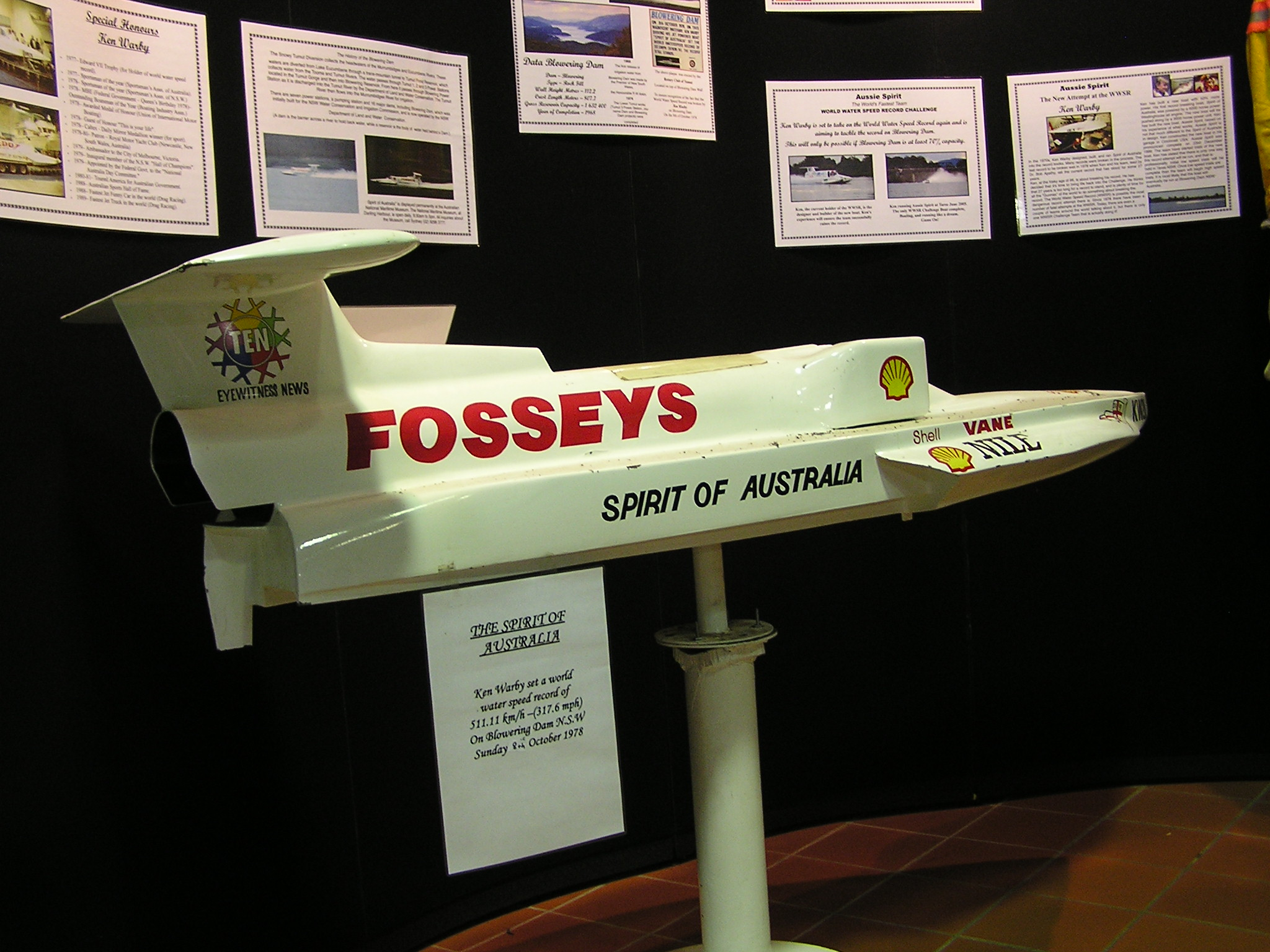
Model of Spirit of Australia in which Ken Warby set the world water speed record in 1978 on the dam.

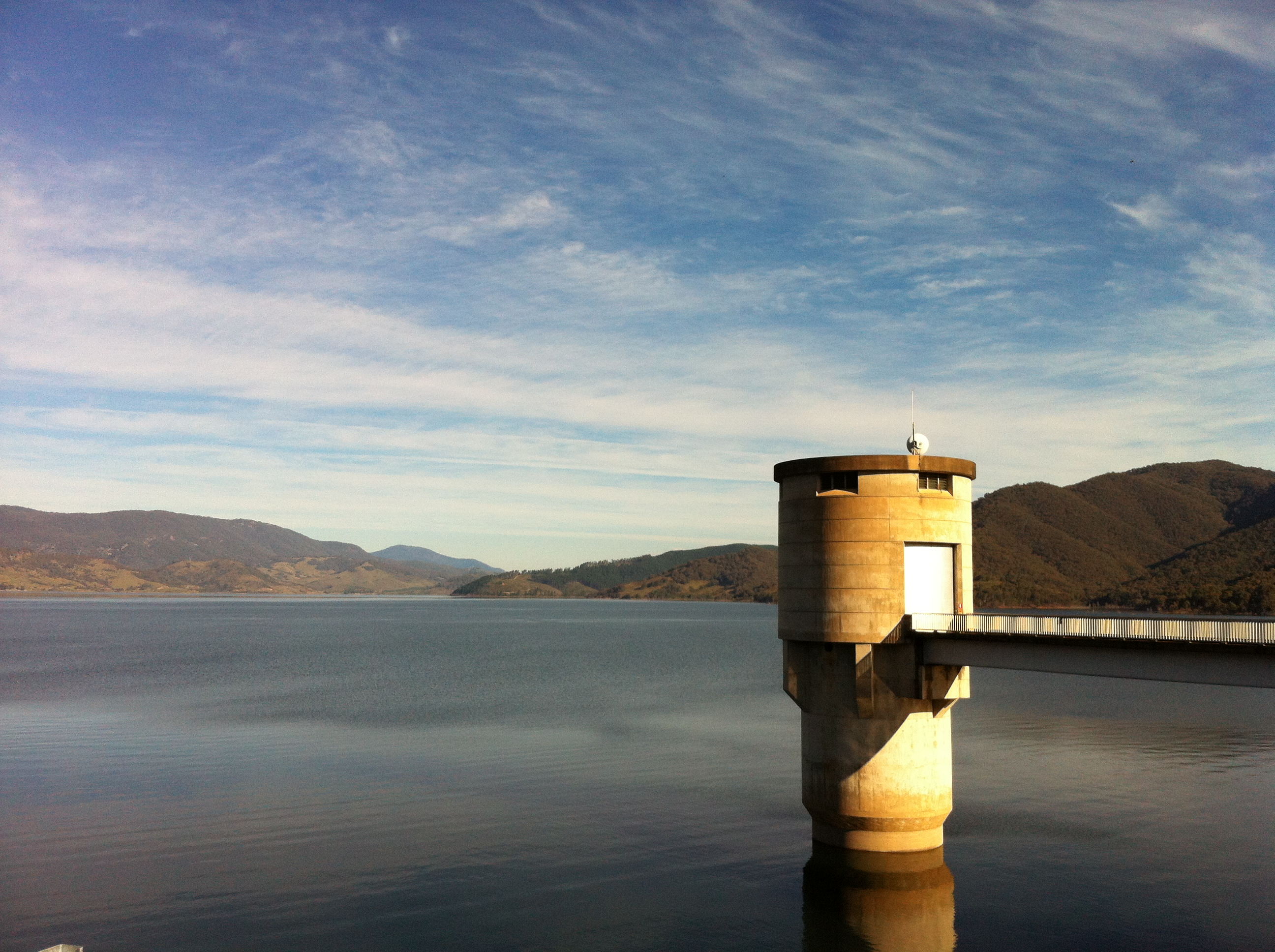
View of Blowering Reservoir from Blowering Dam, 2012.

== See also ==
- List of dams and reservoirs in New South Wales
- Hume and Hovell Track
- Snowy Mountains Scheme
- Snowy Hydro Limited
