= Boeing Model 360 =

American experimental helicopter

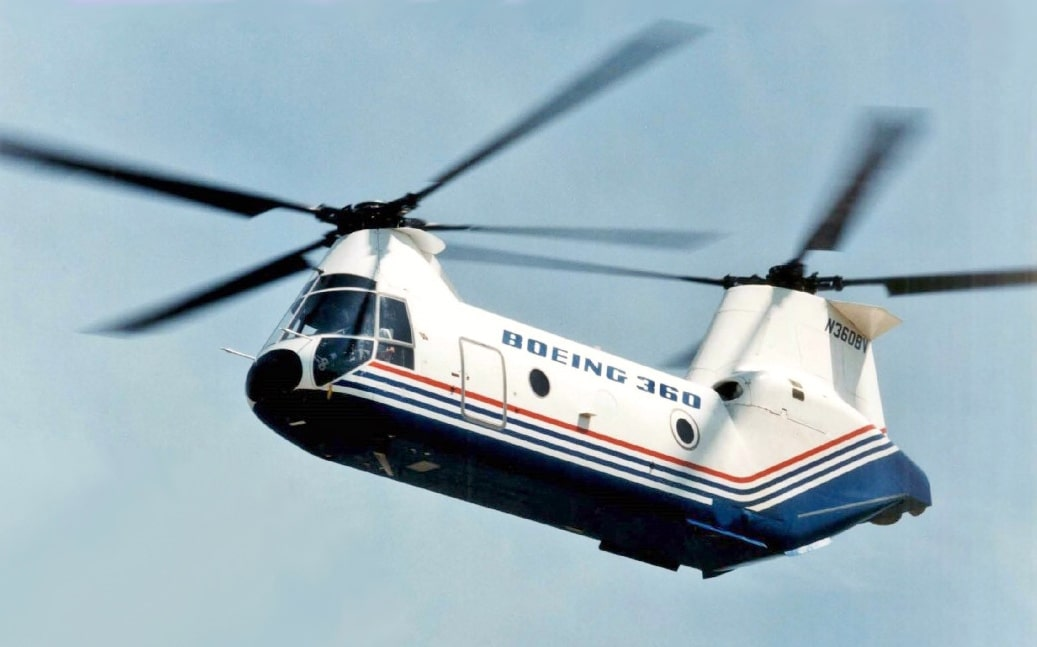

General information
- Type: Experimental Helicopter
- National origin: United States
- Manufacturer: Boeing Helicopters
- Status: Retired
- Primary user: Boeing Helicopters
- Number built: 1

History
- Manufactured: 1987
- First flight: June 10, 1987

The Boeing Model 360 is an American experimental medium-lift tandem rotor cargo helicopter developed privately by Boeing to demonstrate advanced helicopter technology. The aircraft was intended as a technology demonstrator, with no plans to put the type into production, and many of its design features were carried onto other programs including the RAH-66 Comanche and V-22 Osprey. The sole prototype is preserved in a static exhibit at the American Helicopter Museum in West Chester, Pennsylvania.

== Design and development ==
Boeing Vertol developed its Model 360 in the 1980s as a technology demonstrator with company funds. It was a new design and made significant use of composites.

The Boeing Model 360 differed from its brethren CH-46 and CH-47 tandem rotor helicopters by incorporating extensive amounts of composite materials in structural and dynamic components, namely in advanced rotor heads composed of fiberglass and graphite composites, along with graphite fuselage frames and longerons. The exterior of the craft integrated a Nomex core, surfaced by a Kevlar woven mesh with graphite-strengthened edges. The two tandem four-bladed counter-rotating rotors were each driven by Avco Lycoming AL5512 turboshaft engines mounted on either side of the rear fuselage. In another departure from its military brethren, the Model 360 had no external sponsons containing the landing gear or fuel, the tricycle landing gear instead retracting into the main fuselage. Fuel was contained in three crashworthy cells below the cabin floor.

The Model 360 featured a glass cockpit with six multi-function displays (MFD).

== Specifications ==
Data from Jane's All The World's Aircraft 1988–89

General characteristics

- Length: 51 ft 0 in (15.54 m) fuselage only
- Cabin width: 6 ft 4 in (2 m) maximum
- Cabin height: 5 ft 11 in (2 m) maximum
- Height: 19 ft 4.75 in (5.9119 m)
- Gross weight: 30,500 lb (13,835 kg)
- Fuel capacity: 824 US gal (686.1 imp gal; 3,119.2 L) in 1x 238 US gal (198.2 imp gal; 900.9 L) rear fuselage tank and 2x 293 US gal (244.0 imp gal; 1,109.1 L) forward fuselage tanks
- Powerplant: 2 × Textron Lycoming AL5512 turboshaft engines, 4,200 shp (3,100 kW) each
- Main rotor diameter: 2 × 50 ft 0 in (15.24 m)
- Main rotor area: 3,927.5 sq ft (364.88 m^{2})
- Blade section: - root: Boeing VR-12; tip: Boeing VR-15

Performance

- Maximum speed: 200 kn (230 mph, 370 km/h)
- Cruise speed: 180 kn (210 mph, 330 km/h)
- Never exceed speed: 235 kn (270 mph, 435 km/h)
- Disk loading: 7.766 lb/sq ft (37.92 kg/m^{2})

== See also ==
Related development

- Boeing Vertol CH-46 Sea Knight
- Boeing CH-47 Chinook

Aircraft of comparable role, configuration, and era

- Bell D-292
- Sikorsky S-75
