= Boeing Vertol CH-46 Sea Knight =

Tandem transport helicopter designed by Vertol

CH-46 Sea Knight Model 107
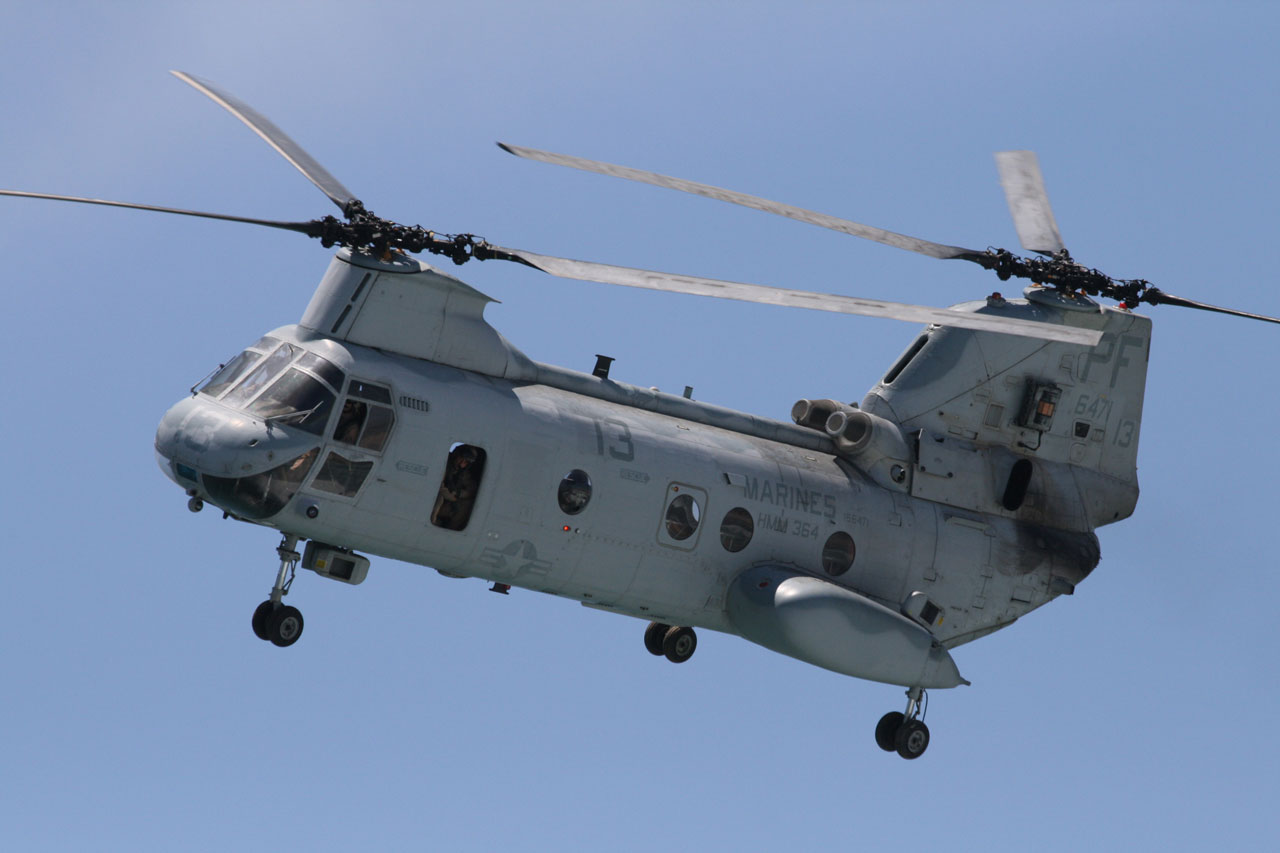
- A US Marine Corps CH-46 of HMM-364 flies over Huntington Beach, California, in October 2011.

General information
- Type: Transport helicopter
- National origin: United States
- Manufacturer: Vertol Aircraft Corp.; Boeing Vertol
- Status: In limited service
- Primary users: United States Marine Corps (historical): United States Navy (historical); Japan Self-Defense Forces (historical)
- Number built: H-46: 524

History
- Manufactured: 1962–1971
- Introduction date: 1964
- First flight: 22 April 1958 (V-107)
- Retired: 2004 (US Navy); 2015 (US Marine Corps)
- Developed into: Boeing CH-47 Chinook; Boeing Model 360

The Boeing Vertol CH-46 Sea Knight is an American medium-lift tandem-rotor transport helicopter powered by twin turboshaft engines. It was designed by Vertol and manufactured by Boeing Vertol following Vertol's acquisition by Boeing.

Development of the Sea Knight, which was originally designated by the firm as the Vertol Model 107, commenced during 1956. It was envisioned as a successor to the first generation of rotorcraft, such as the H-21 "Flying Banana", that had been powered by piston engines; in its place, the V-107 made use of the emergent turboshaft engine. On 22 April 1958, the V-107 prototype performed its maiden flight. During June 1958, the US Army awarded a contract for the construction of ten production-standard aircraft, designated as the YHC-1A, based on the V-107; this initial order was later cut down to three YHC-1As. During 1961, the US Marine Corps (USMC), which had been studying its requirements for a medium-lift, twin-turbine cargo/troop assault helicopter, selected Boeing Vertol's Model 107M as the basis from which to manufacture a suitable rotorcraft to meet their needs. Known colloquially as the "Phrog" and formally as the "Sea Knight", it was operated across all US Marine Corps' operational environments between its introduction during the Vietnam War and its frontline retirement during 2014.

The Sea Knight was operated by the USMC to provide all-weather, day-or-night assault transport of combat troops, supplies and equipment until it was replaced by the MV-22 Osprey during the 2010s. The USMC also used the helicopter for combat support, search and rescue (SAR), casualty evacuation and Tactical Recovery of Aircraft and Personnel (TRAP). The Sea Knight also functioned as the US Navy's standard medium-lift utility helicopter prior to the type being phased out of service in favor of the MH-60S Knighthawk during the early 2000s. Several overseas operators acquired the rotorcraft as well. Canada operated the Sea Knight, designated as CH-113; the type was used predominantly in the SAR role until 2004. Other export customers for the type included Japan, Sweden, and Saudi Arabia. The commercial version of the rotorcraft is the BV 107-II, commonly referred to simply as the "Vertol". The Sea Knight is an amphibious helicopter, able to land directly on calm water and float, but only for a few hours.

== Development ==
=== Origins ===
During the 1940s and 1950s, American rotorcraft manufacturer Piasecki Helicopter emerged as a pioneering developer of tandem-rotor helicopters; perhaps the most famous of these being the piston-powered H-21 "Flying Banana", an early utility and transport helicopter. During 1955, Piasecki was officially renamed as Vertol Corporation (standing for vertical take-off and landing); it was around this time that work commenced on the development of a new generation of tandem rotor helicopter. During 1956, the new design received the internal company designation of Vertol Model 107, or simply V-107; this rotorcraft differed from its predecessors by harnessing the newly developed turboshaft engine instead of piston-based counterparts. During that year, construction of a prototype, powered by a pair of Lycoming T53 turboshaft engines, each one being capable of producing 877 shp (640 kW), commenced.

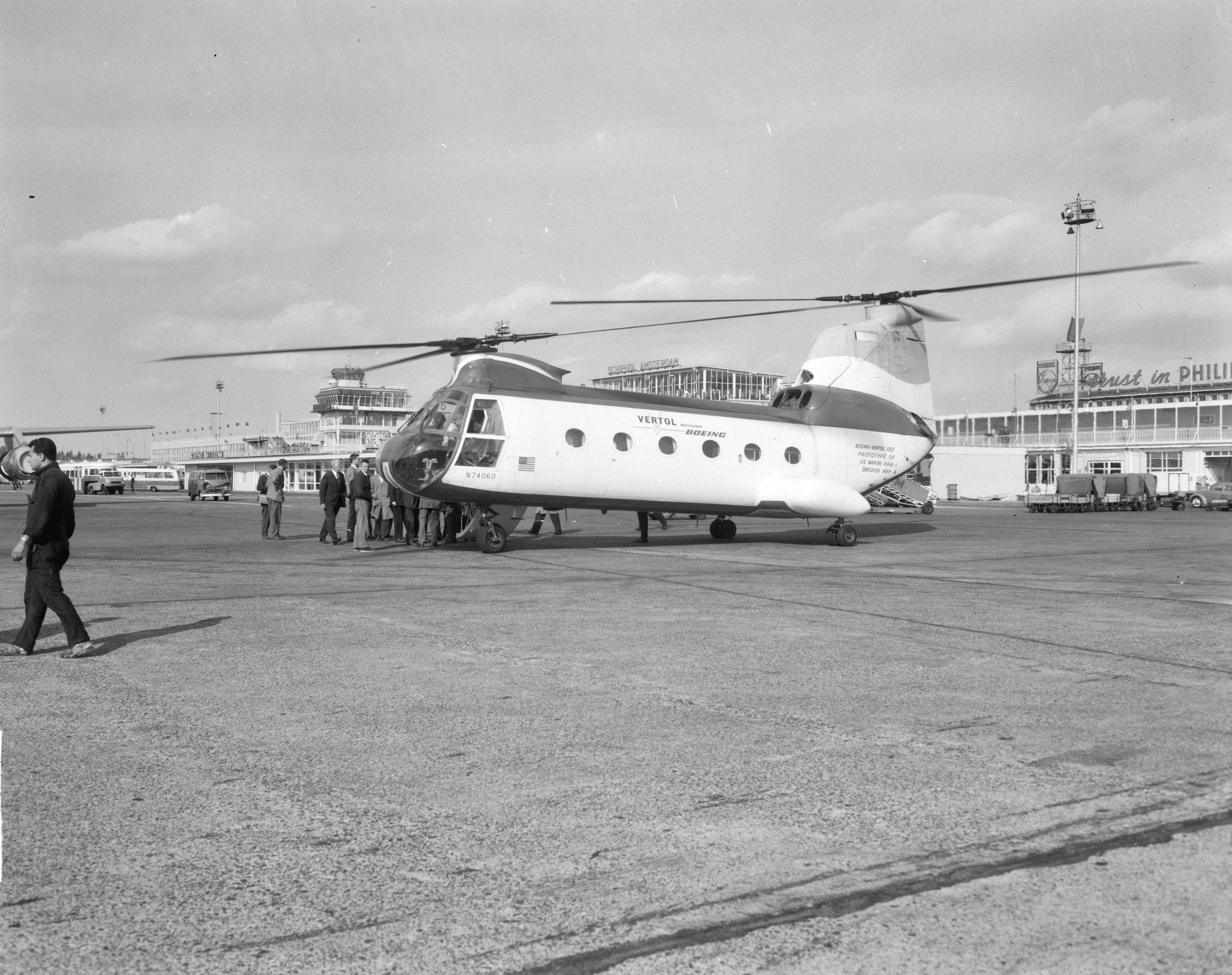
V-107 prototype in 1961

On 22 April 1958, the V-107 prototype performed its maiden flight. In order to garner publicity for the newly developed rotorcraft, it was decided to use the prototype to conduct a series of publicised flight demonstrations during a tour across the United States and several overseas nations. During June 1958, it was announced that the U.S. Army had awarded a contract to Vertol for the construction of ten production-standard aircraft based on the V-107, which were designated YHC-1A. However, this order was later decreased to three helicopters; according to aviation author Jay P. Spenser, the cutback had been enacted in order that the U.S. Army would be able to divert funds for the development of the rival V-114 helicopter, which was also a turbine-powered tandem rotor design but substantially larger than the V-107. All of the U.S. Army's three YHC-1As were powered by pairs of GE-T-58 engines. During August 1959, the first YHC-1A-model rotorcraft conducted its first flight; independently, it was shortly followed by the maiden flight of an improved model intended for the commercial and export markets, designated 107-II.

During 1960, the U.S. Marine Corps evolved a requirement for a medium-lift, twin-turbine troop/cargo assault helicopter to replace the various piston-engined types that were then in widespread use with the service. That same year, American aviation company Boeing acquired Vertol, after which the group was consequently renamed Boeing Vertol. Following a competition between several competing designs, during early 1961, it was announced that Boeing Vertol had been selected to manufacture its model 107M for the U.S. Marine Corps, where it was designated HRB-1. During 1962, the U.S. Air Force placed its own order for 12 XCH-46B Sea Knight helicopters, which used the XH-49A designation; however, the service later decided to cancel the order due to delays in its delivery; instead, the U.S. Air Force opted to procure the rival Sikorsky S-61R in its place.

Following the Sea Knight's first flight in August 1962, the military designation was changed to CH-46A. During November 1964, the introduction of the Marines' CH-46A and the Navy's UH-46As commenced. The UH-46A variant was a modified version of the rotorcraft to perform the vertical replenishment mission. The CH-46A was equipped with a pair of T58-GE8-8B turboshaft engines, each being rated at 1,250 shp (930 kW); these allowed the Sea Knight to carry up to 17 passengers or a maximum of 4,000 pounds (1,815 kg) of cargo.

=== Further developments ===
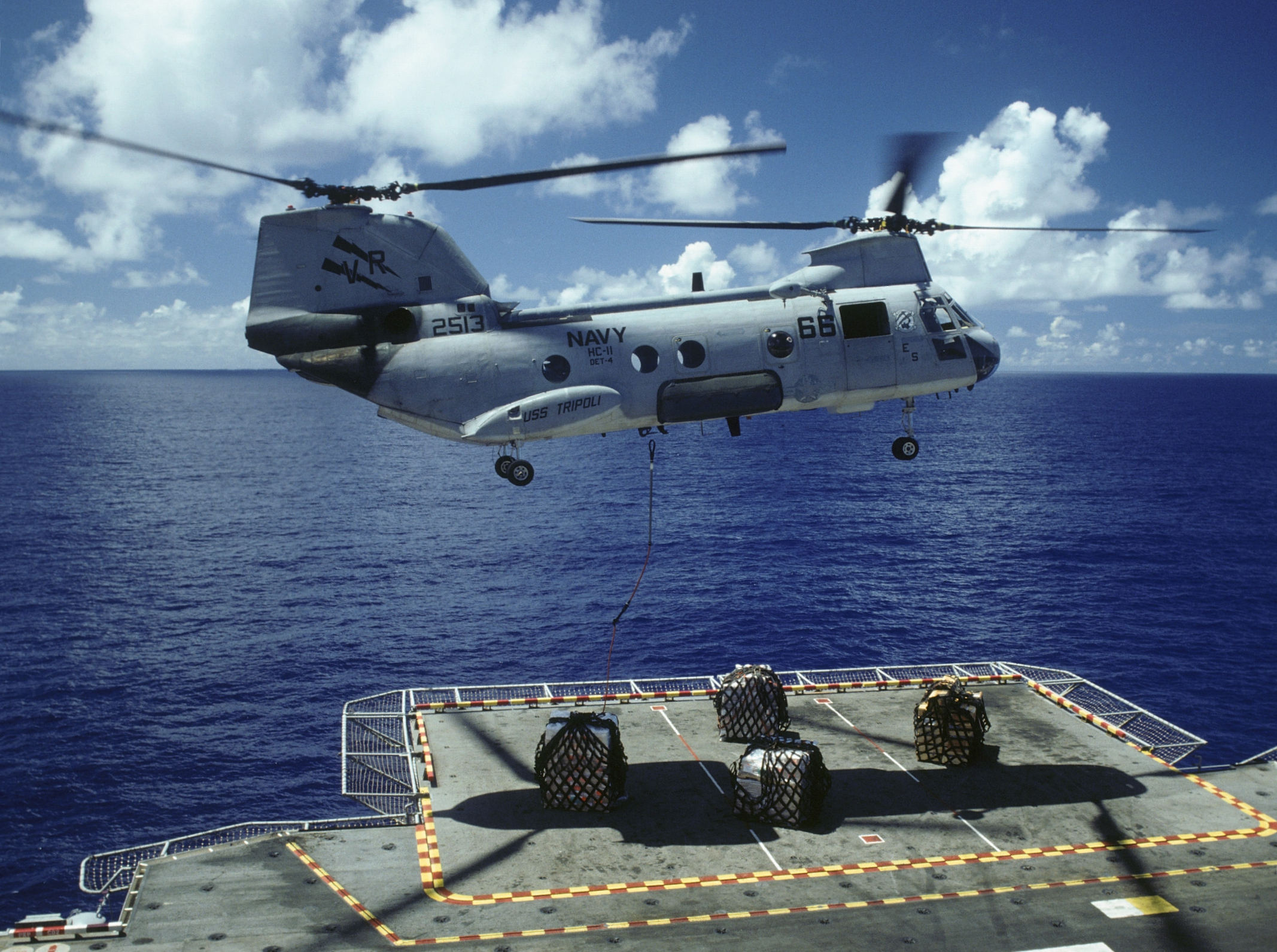
HH-46D of the Navy resupplies USS Tripoli during a VERTREP, 1994

During 1966, production of the improved CH-46D commenced with deliveries following shortly thereafter. This model featured various improvements, including modified rotor blades and the adoption of more powerful T58-GE-10 turboshaft engines, rated at 1,400 shp (1,040 kW) each. The increased power of these new engines allowed the CH-46D to carry an increased payload, such as up to 25 troops or a maximum of 7,000 pounds (3,180 kg) of cargo. During late 1967, the improved model was introduced to the Vietnam theater, where it supplemented the U.S. Marine Corps' existing CH-46A fleet, which had proven to be relatively unreliable and problematic in service. Along with the USMC's CH-46Ds, the U.S. Navy also acquired a small number of UH-46Ds for ship resupply purposes. In addition, approximately 33 CH-46As were progressively re-manufactured to the CH-46D standard.

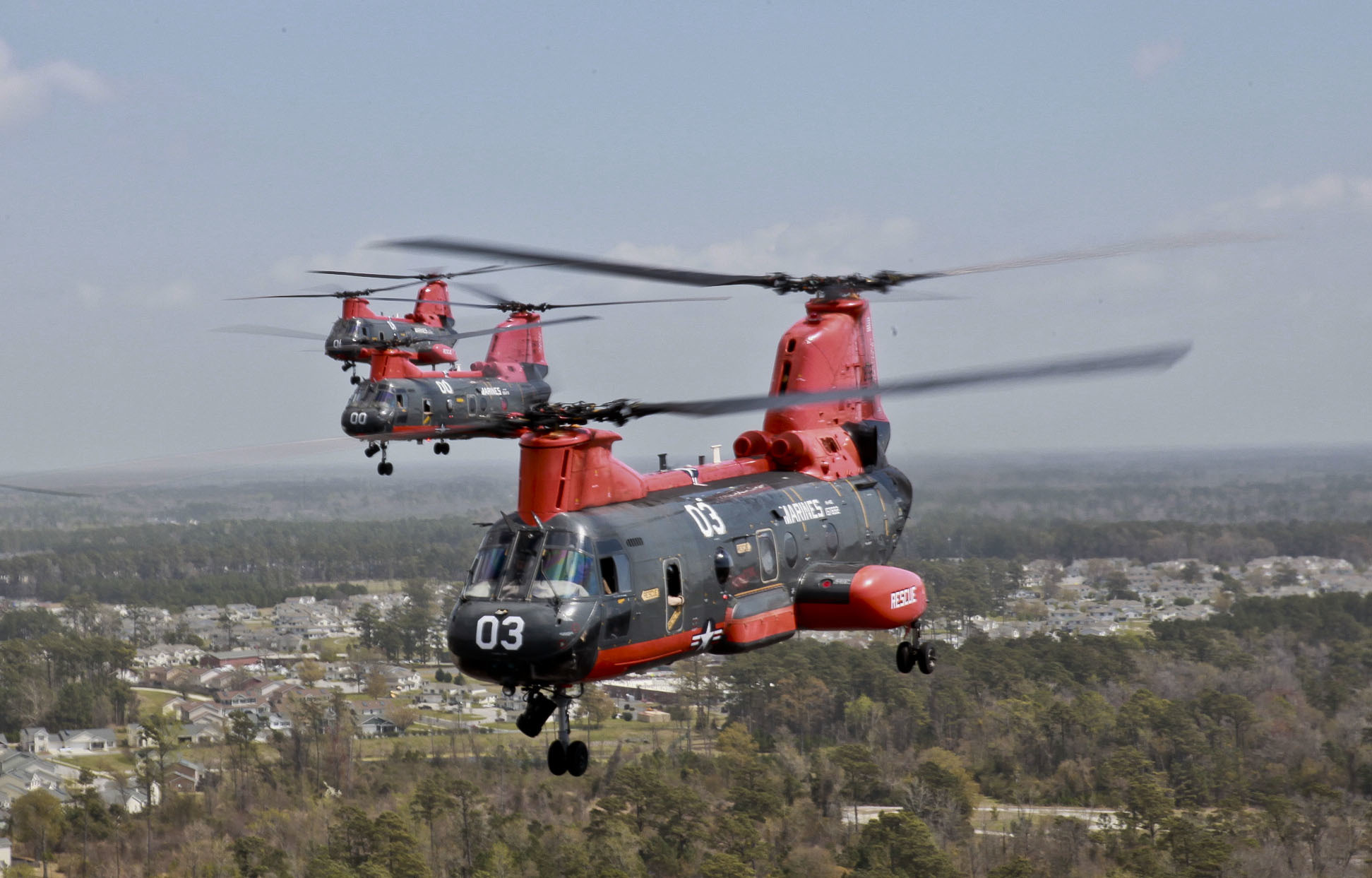
Formation of HH-46Es, used for search and rescue

Between 1968 and 1971, the U.S. Marine Corps received a number of CH-46F standard rotorcraft. This model retained the T58-GE-10 engines used on the CH-46D while featuring revised avionics and featured a number of other modifications. The CH-46F was the final production model of the type. During its service life, the Sea Knight received a variety of upgrades and modifications. Over time, the majority of the U.S. Marine Corps' Sea Knights were upgraded to the improved CH-46E standard. This model featured fiberglass rotor blades, reinforcement measures throughout the airframe, along with the refitting of further uprated T58-GE-16 engines, capable of producing 1,870 shp (1,390 kW) each; in addition, several CH-46Es were modified to double their maximum fuel capacity. Starting in the mid-1990s, the Dynamic Component Upgrade (DCU) programmes was enacted, focusing on the implementation of strengthened drive systems and modified rotor controls.

The commercial variant, the BV 107-II, was first ordered by New York Airways during 1960. During July 1962, they took delivery of their first three aircraft, which was configured to seat up to 25 passengers. During 1965, Boeing Vertol sold the manufacturing rights of the 107 to Japanese conglomerate Kawasaki Heavy Industries. Under this arrangement, all Model 107 civilian and military aircraft built in Japan were referred to by the KV 107 designation. On 15 December 2006, Columbia Helicopters, Inc acquired the type certificate for the BV 107-II, and with the help of Piasecki eventually developed an original design, the Model 107-III, remanufactured from older airframes. This model features new manufactured CT58-GE-16 engines, the commercial version of the upgraded engines used for the CH-46E as well as modernized avionics including a glass cockpit.

== Design ==
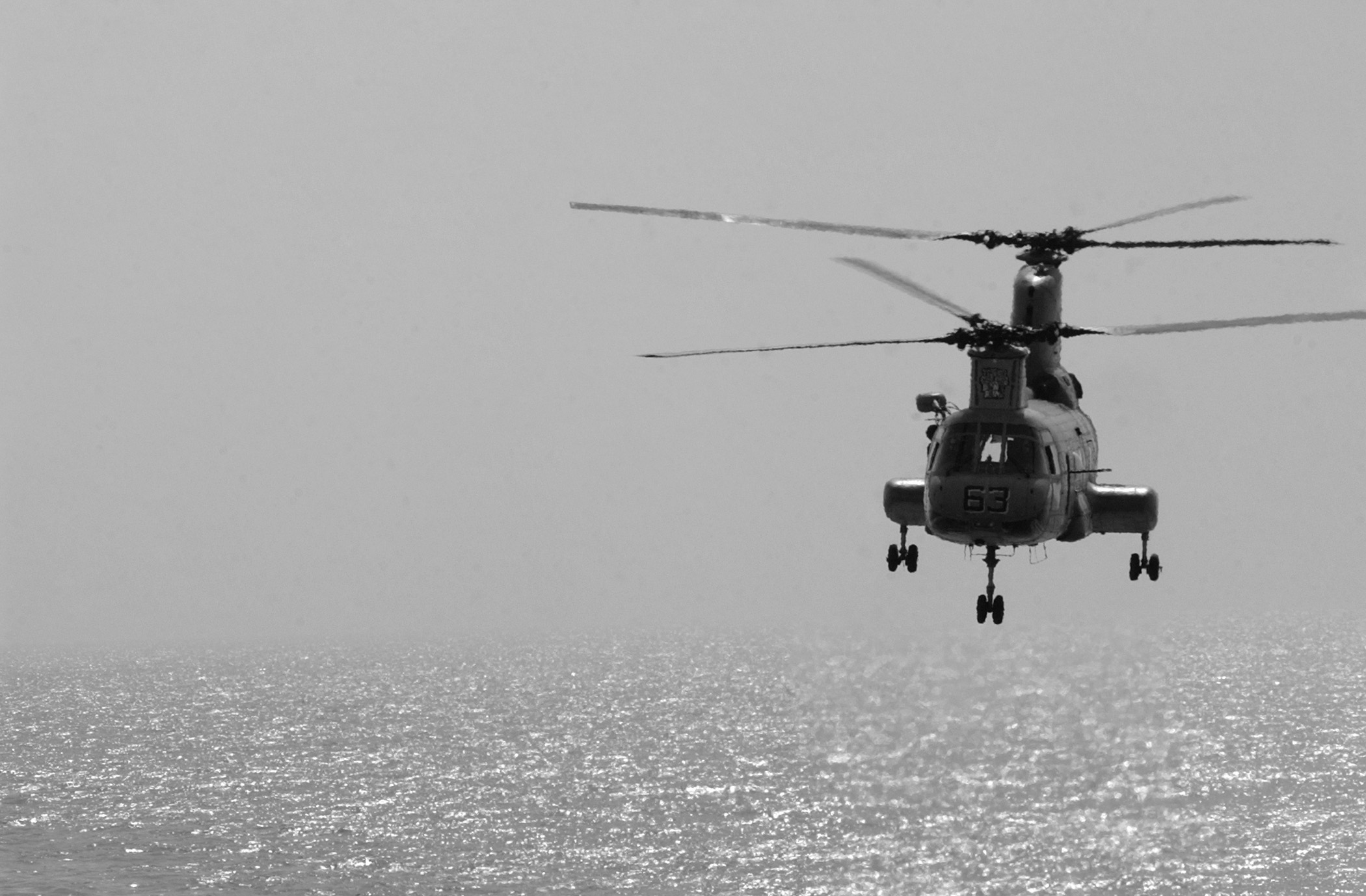
Sea Knight carrying supplies, with its tricycle landing gear silhouetted

The Boeing Vertol CH-46 Sea Knight is a medium-lift tandem-rotor transport helicopter, furnished with a set of counter-rotating main rotors in a tandem-rotor configuration. It was typically powered by a pair of General Electric T58 turboshaft engines, which were mounted on each side of the rear rotor pedestal; power to the forward rotor was transferred from the rear-mounted engines via a drive shaft. For redundancy, both engines are coupled so that either one would be capable of powering both of the main rotors in the event of a single engine failure or a similar emergency situation. Each of the rotors feature three blades, which can be folded to better facilitate storage and naval operations. The CH-46 features a fixed tricycle landing gear, complete with twin wheels on all three legs of the landing gear; this configuration results in a nose-up stance, helping to facilitate cargo loading and unloading. Two of the main landing gear were installed within protruding rear sponsons; the free interior space of the sponsons are also used to house fuel tanks, possessing a total capacity of 350 US gallons (1,438 L).

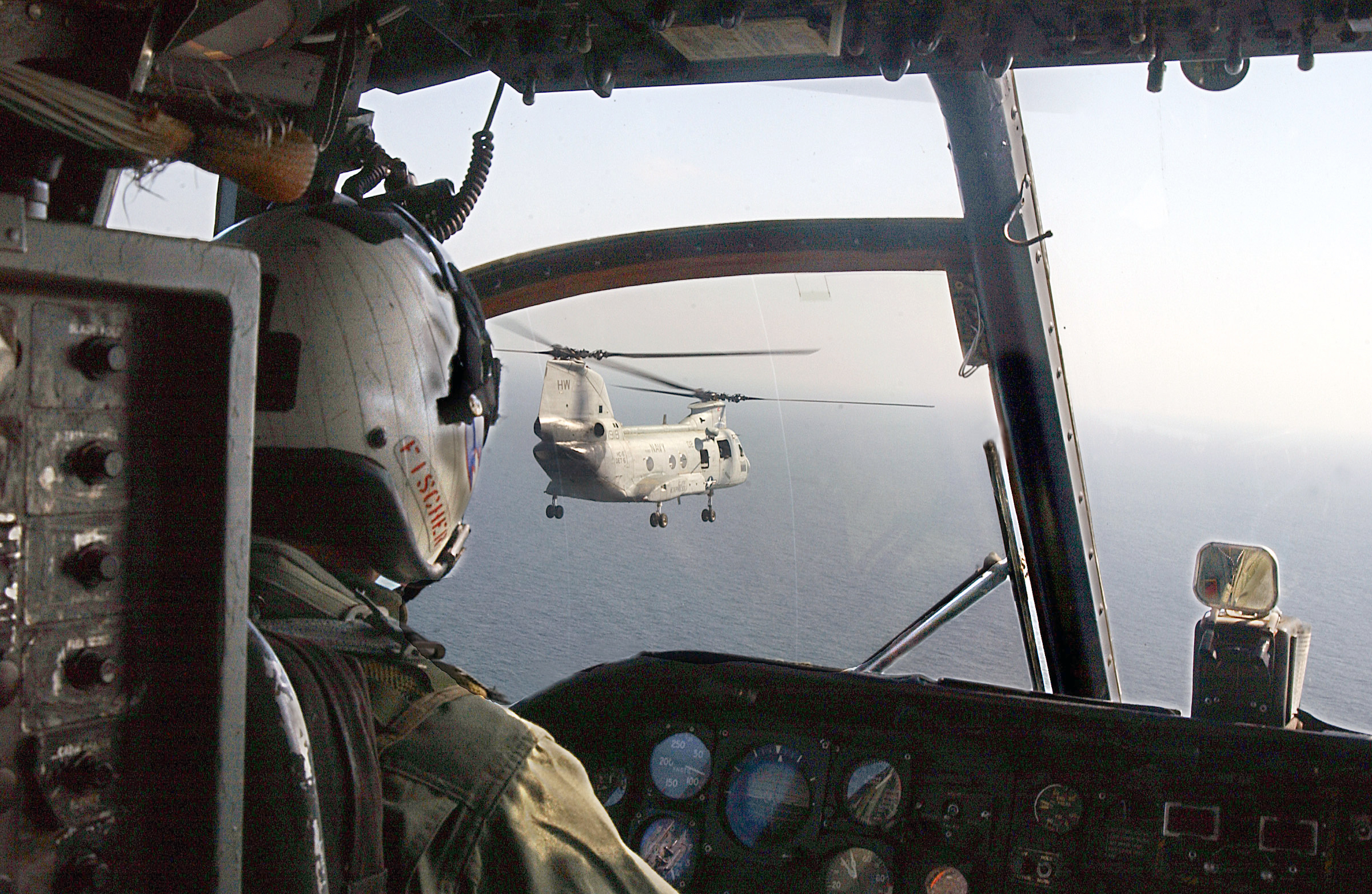
Looking out from a cockpit of a CH-46, at another

The interior of the CH-46 was largely taken up by its cargo bay, complete with a rear loading ramp that could be removed or left open in flight for the carriage of extended cargoes or for parachute drops. Various furnishings were normally provided to aid in its use as a utility rotorcraft, such as an internal winch mounted within the forward cabin, which can be used to assisting loading by pulling external cargo on pallets into the aircraft via the ramp and rollers, and an optionally-attached belly-mounted cargo hook, which would be usually rated at 10,000 lb (4,500 kg) for carrying cargoes externally underneath the Sea Knight; despite the hook having been rated at 10,000 lb (4,500 kg), this was safety restricted to less payload as they got older. When operated in a typical configuration, the CH-46 would usually be operated by a crew of three; a larger crew could be accommodated when required, which would be dependent upon mission specifics. For example, a search and rescue (SAR) variant would usually carry a crew of five (Pilot, Co-Pilot, Crew Chief, Swimmer, and Medic) to facilitate all aspects of such operations. For self-defense, a pintle-mounted 0.50 in (12.7 mm) M2 Browning machine gun could be mounted on each side of the helicopter. Service in southeast Asia resulted in the addition of armor along with the machine guns.

The CH-46 was a partially amphibious helicopter, and could land directly on water and rest for up to two hours in calm water.

== Operational history ==
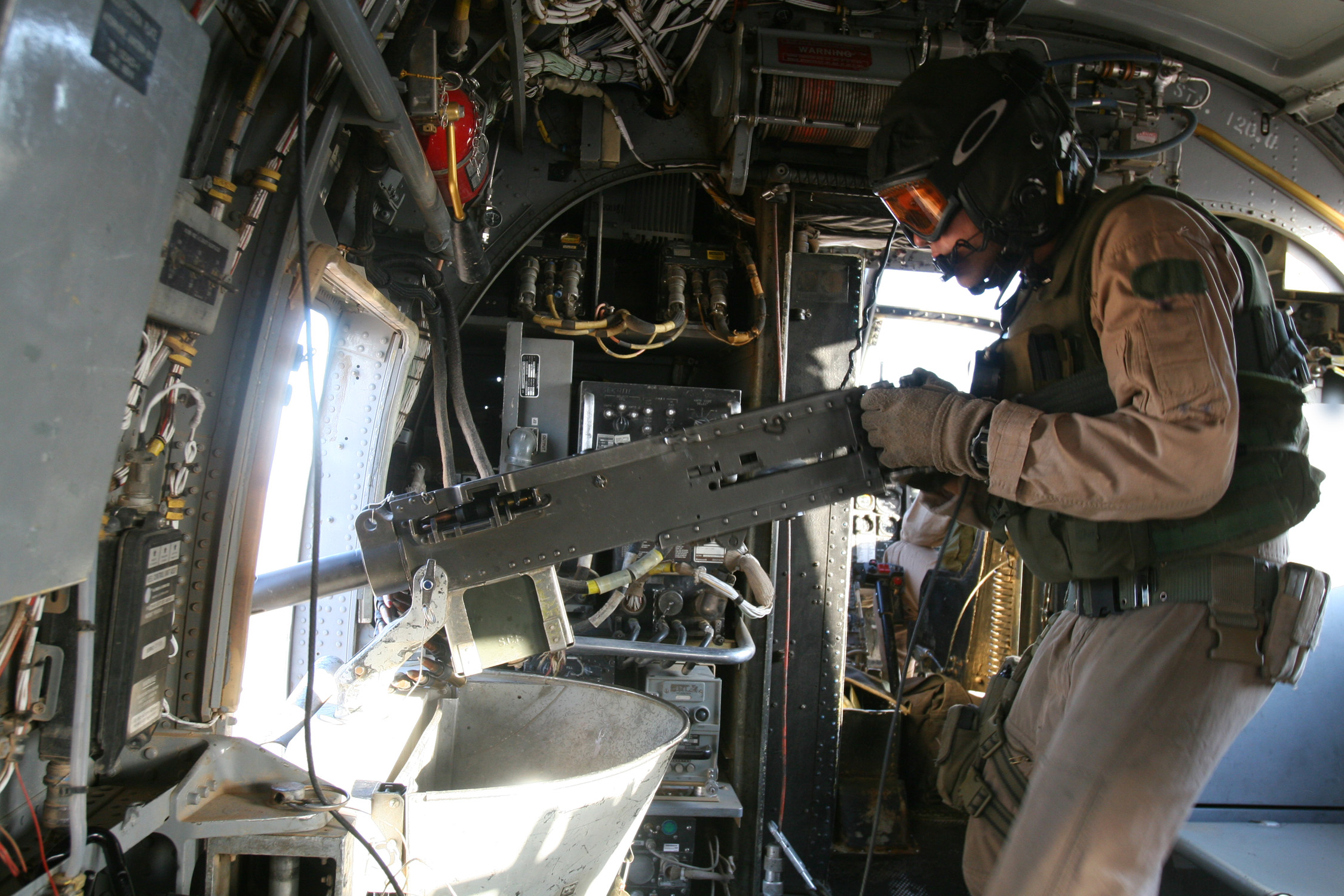
A door gunner manning a pintle-mounted .50-caliber M2 Browning machine gun aboard a Marine CH-46 in Iraq, August 2006

=== United States ===
Known colloquially as the "Phrog", the Sea Knight was used in all U.S. Marine operational environments between its introduction during the Vietnam War and its retirement in 2015. The type's longevity and reputation for reliability led to mantras such as "phrogs phorever" and "never trust a helicopter under 30". CH-46s transported personnel, evacuated wounded, supplied forward arming and refueling points (FARP), performed vertical replenishment, search and rescue, recovered downed aircraft and crews and other tasks.

==== Vietnam War ====
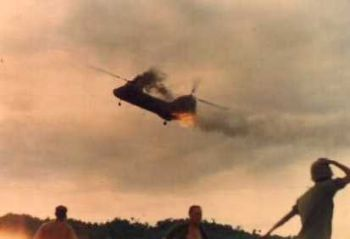
A flaming Marine CH-46 of HMM-265, after being hit by enemy AAA fire in "Helicopter Valley", 15 July 1966

During the Vietnam War, the CH-46 was one of the prime US Marine troop transport helicopters in the theater, slotting between the smaller Bell UH-1 Iroquois and larger Sikorsky CH-53 Sea Stallion and progressively replacing the UH-34. CH-46 operations were plagued by major technical problems; the engines, being prone to foreign object damage (FOD) from debris being ingested when hovering close to the ground and subsequently suffering a compressor stall, had a lifespan as low as 85 flight hours; on 21 July 1966, all CH-46s were grounded until more efficient filters had been fitted.

On 3 May 1967, a CH-46D at Marine Corps Air Facility Santa Ana crashed, killing all four members of the crew. Within three days the accident investigators had determined that the mounting brackets of the main transmission had failed, allowing the front and rear overlapping rotors to intermesh. All CH-46s were temporarily grounded for inspection. On 13 May, a CH-46A crashed off the coast of Vietnam when the tail pylon containing the engines, main transmission and aft rotors broke off in flight. All four crew members were killed. On 20 June, another CH-46A crashed, though two of the four-man crew survived. Once again, even though the aircraft was not recovered from the water, failure of some sort in the rear pylon was suspected. On 30 June a CH-46D at Santa Ana crashed when a rotor blade separated from the aircraft, all three of the crew survived. As a result of this latest accident, all CH-46Ds were immediately grounded, but the CH-46As continued flying. On 3 July another CH-46A crashed in Vietnam, killing all four Marines of its crew. The cause of the crash again was traced to failure of the main transmission.

On 31 August 1967, a CH-46A on a medical evacuation mission to USS Tripoli disintegrated in midair killing all its occupants. The following day another CH-46A experienced a similar incident at Marble Mountain Air Facility leading to the type being grounded for all except emergency situations and cutting Marine airlift capacity in half. An investigation conducted by a joint Naval Air Systems Command/Boeing Vertol accident investigation team revealed that structural failures were occurring in the area of the rear pylon resulting in the rear rotor tearing off in flight and may have been the cause of several earlier losses. The team recommended structural and systems modifications to reinforce the rear rotor mount as well as installation of an indicator to detect excessive strain on critical parts of the aircraft. 80 CH-46As were shipped to Marine Corps Air Station Futenma, Okinawa where they received the necessary modifications by a combined force of Marine and Boeing Vertol personnel. The modified CH-46As began returning to service in December 1967 and all had been returned to service by February 1968.

During the 1972 Easter Offensive, Sea Knights saw heavy use to convey US and South Vietnamese ground forces to and around the front lines. Marine CH-46s participated in Operation Frequent Wind, the evacuation of Saigon, in April 1975 and the last helicopter to leave the roof of the US embassy was a CH-46 of HMM-164. By the end of US military operations in Vietnam, over a hundred Sea Knights had been lost to enemy fire.

==== Post-Vietnam ====
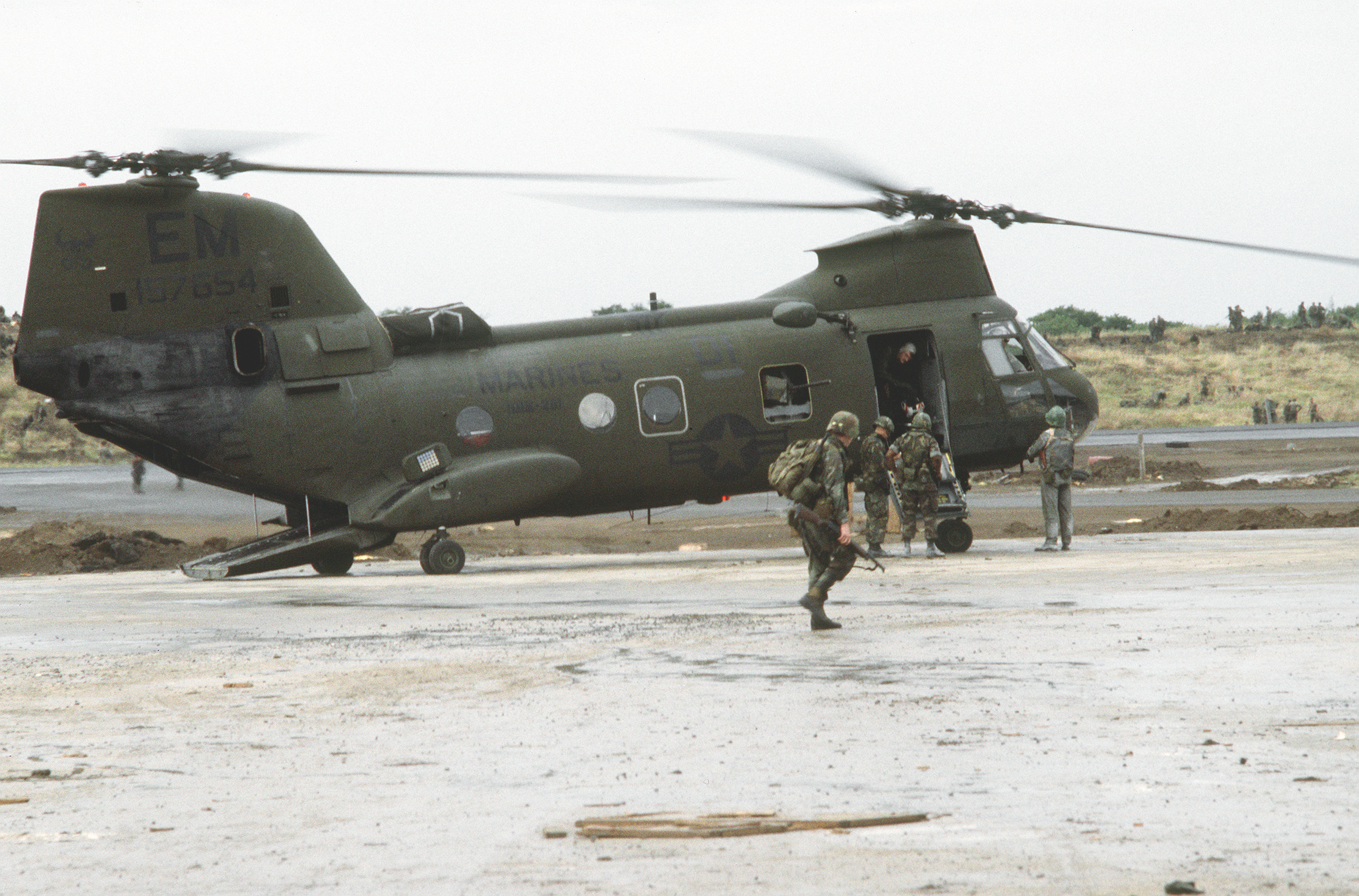
Soldiers from the 2nd Ranger Battalion board a Marine Corps CH-46E helicopter from VMM-261 before the rescue of American students at St. George's University during Operation Urgent Fury in 1983.

In February 1968 the Marine Corps Development and Education Command obtained several CH-46s to perform herbicide dissemination tests using HIDAL (Helicopter, Insecticide Dispersal Apparatus, Liquid) systems; testing indicated the need for redesign and further study. Tandem-rotor helicopters were often used to transport nuclear warheads; the CH-46A was evaluated to deploy naval special forces with the Special Atomic Demolition Munition (SADM). Nuclear Weapon Accident Exercise 1983 (NUWAX-83), simulating the crash of a Navy CH-46E carrying 3 nuclear warheads, was conducted at the Nevada Test Site on behalf of several federal agencies; the exercise, which used real radiological agents, was depicted in a Defense Nuclear Agency-produced documentary.

In late 1982, two CH-46D and CH-46Es assisted with testing of the Arapaho Containerized Aircraft Handling System in Chesapeake Bay aboard MA-257 Export Leader, a modified container ship. During these tests, conducted over three days from October 5-7, 178 day and 45 night landings were conducted (the CH-46s did not participate in the night landings). Several of these landing were conducted simultaneously. Although the tests achieved early success, the program was ultimately not continued.

U.S. Marine CH-46s were used to deploy the 8th Marine Regiment into Grenada during Operation Urgent Fury, evacuated the surviving crew member from a downed AH-1 Cobra, and then carried infantry from the 75th Ranger Regiment to secure and evacuate U.S. students at St. George's University, though one crashed after colliding with a palm tree.

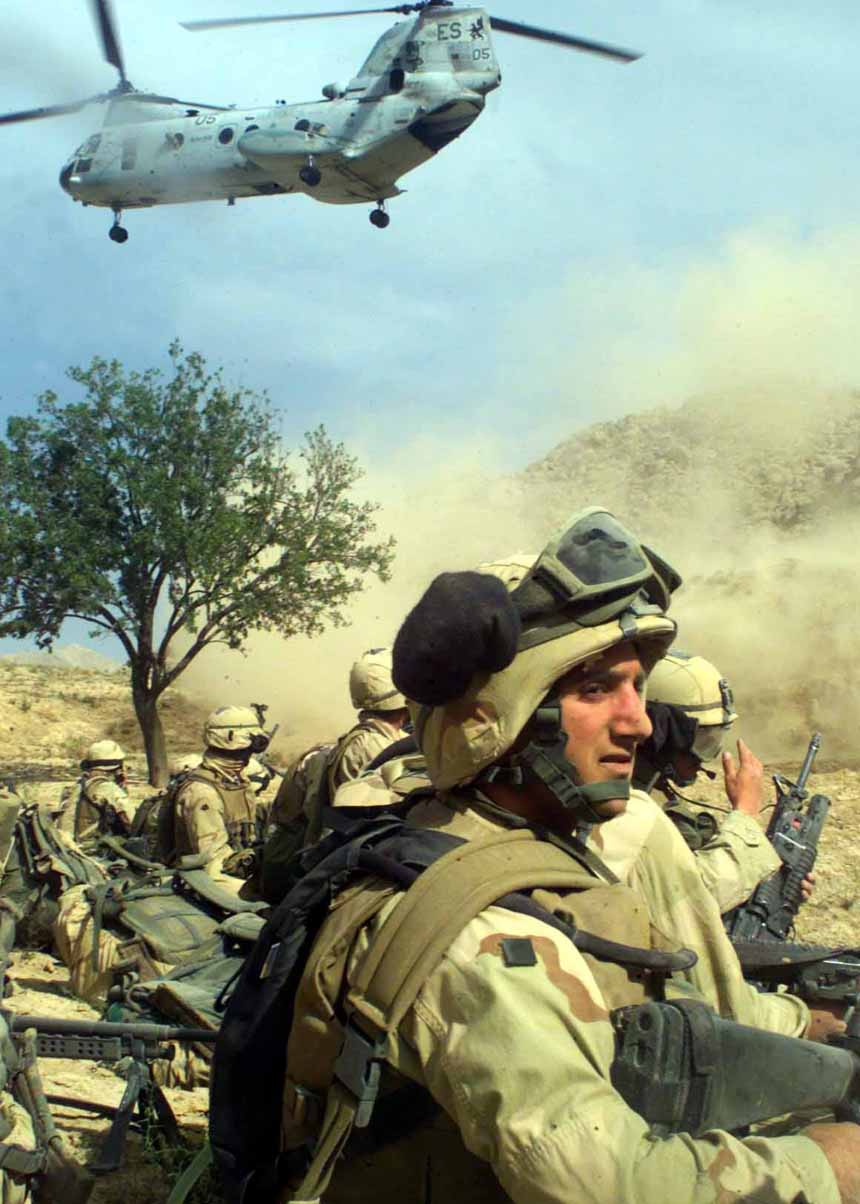
A CH-46 departing after dropping off Marines of the 22nd Marine Expeditionary Unit in South Central Afghanistan, 2004

CH-46E Sea Knights were also used by the U.S. Marine Corps during the 2003 invasion of Iraq. In one incident on 1 April 2003, Marine CH-46Es and CH-53Es carried U.S. Army Rangers and Special Operations troops on an extraction mission for captured Army Private Jessica Lynch from an Iraqi hospital. During the subsequent occupation of Iraq and counter-insurgency operations, the CH-46E was heavily used in the CASEVAC role, being required to maintain 24/7 availability regardless of conditions. According to authors Williamson Murray and Robert H Scales, the Sea Knight displayed serious reliability and maintenance problems during its deployment to Iraq, as well as "limited lift capabilities". Following the loss of numerous US helicopters in the Iraqi theatre, the Marines opted to equip their CH-46s with more advanced anti-missile countermeasures.

The U.S. Navy retired the type on 24 September 2004, replacing it with the MH-60S Seahawk; the Marine Corps maintained its fleet as the MV-22 Osprey was fielded. In March 2006 Marine Medium Helicopter Squadron 263 (HMM-263) was deactivated and redesignated VMM-263 to serve as the first MV-22 squadron. The replacement process continued through the other medium helicopter squadrons into 2014. On 5 October 2014, the Sea Knight performed its final service flight with the U.S. Marine Corps at Marine Corps Air Station Miramar. HMM-364 was the last squadron to use it outside the United States, landing it aboard USS America on her maiden transit. On 9 April 2015, the CH-46 was retired by the Marine Medium Helicopter Training Squadron 164, the last Marine Corps squadron to transition to the MV-22. The USMC retired the CH-46 on 1 August 2015 in a ceremony at the Udvar-Hazy Center near Washington DC.

Beginning in April 2011 the Navy's Fleet Readiness Center East began refurbishing retired USMC CH-46Es for service with the United States Department of State Air Wing. A number of CH-46s from HMX-1 were transferred to the Air Wing in late 2014. In Afghanistan the CH-46s were used by Embassy Air for secure transport of State Department personnel. The CH-46s were equipped with missile warning sensors and flare dispensers and could be armed with M240D or M2 Browning machine guns. A report in September 2019 by the State Department Inspector General found that a seat on a CH-46 for a seven-minute flight cost US$1,500 (~$1,861 in 2025).

==== Evacuation of Afghanistan ====
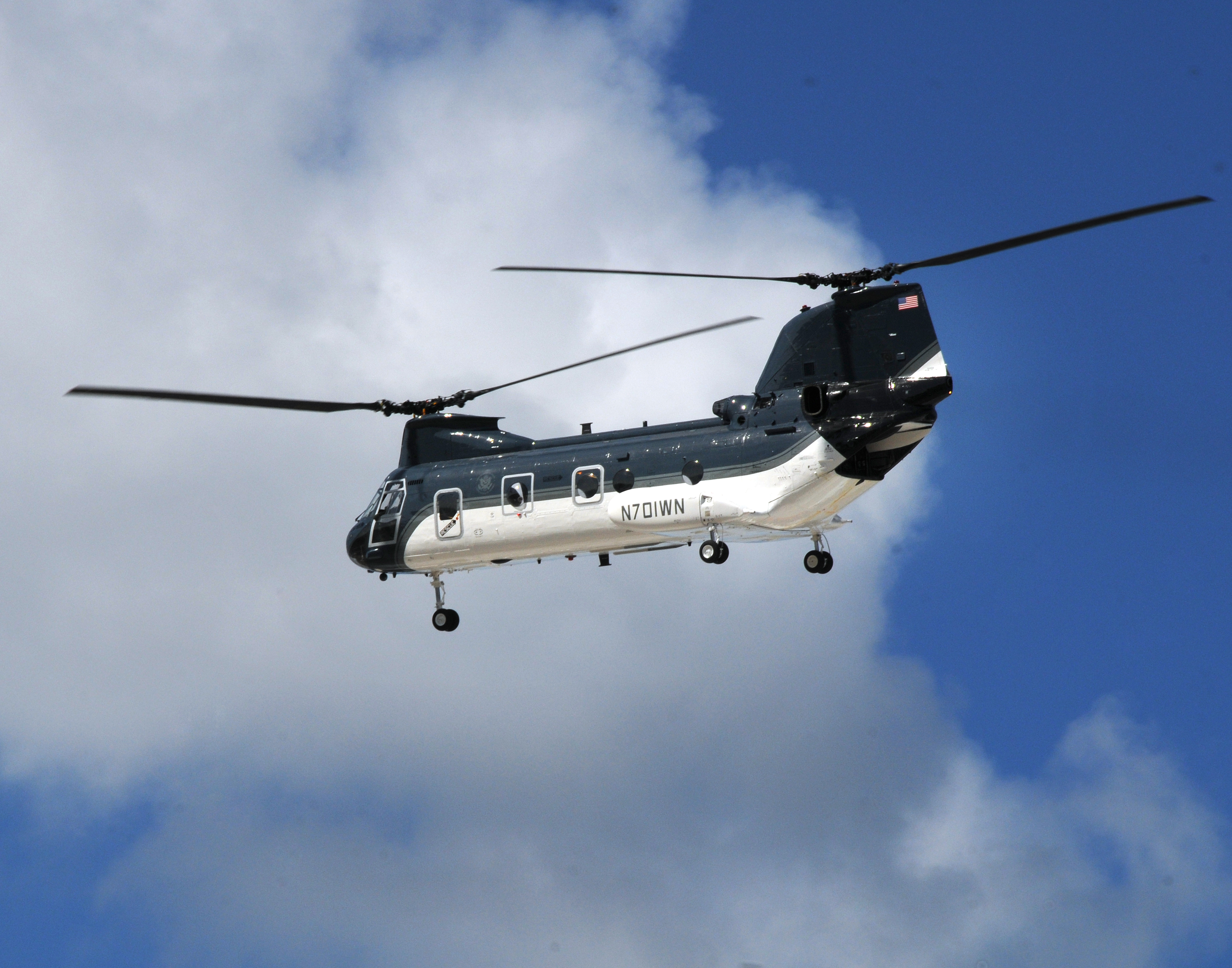
State Department Air Wing CH-46E, 2012

Seven of the State Department Air Wing CH-46s took part in the 2021 Kabul Airlift. Prior to the complete withdrawal of U.S. forces, all seven were rendered unusable and abandoned at Kabul International Airport and are seen in many videos and pictures online. One of the CH-46s that was abandoned (BuNo 154038, c/n 2389) also took part in Operation Frequent Wind 46 years earlier. The U.S. State Department drew criticism for leaving behind the aircraft. Commenting on the issue, the U.S. State Department claimed that the helicopters were already being phased out of State Department Air Wing due to their age and the inability to support them. The seven CH-46s left behind were the only U.S. State Department aircraft left behind at Kabul International Airport.

=== Canada ===
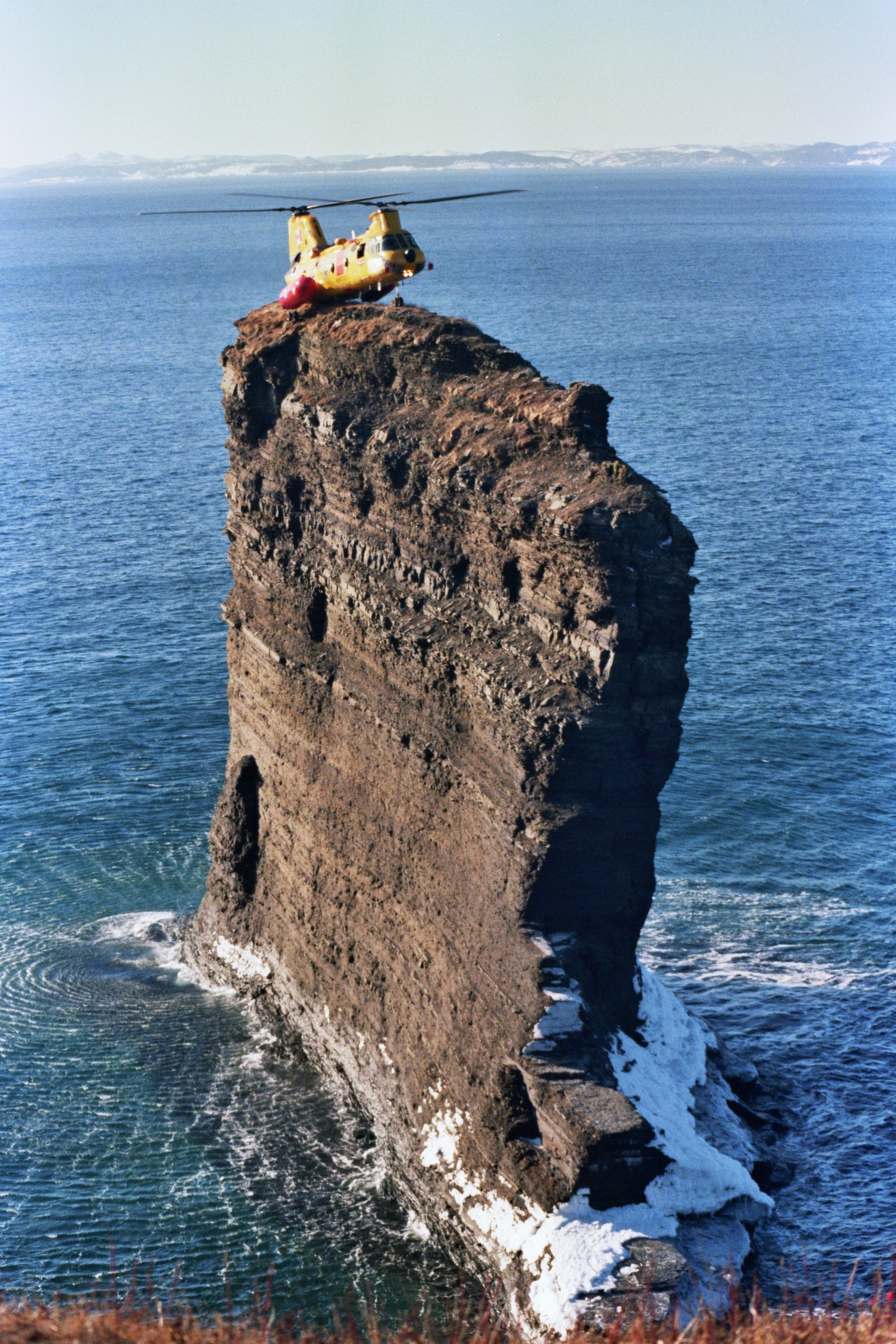
CH-113 Labrador landing on "The Clapper", a sea stack off the tip of Bell Island in Newfoundland

The Royal Canadian Air Force procured six CH-113 Labrador helicopters for the SAR role and the Canadian Army acquired 12 of the similar CH-113A Voyageur for the medium-lift transport role. The RCAF Labradors were delivered first with the first one entering service on 11 October 1963. When the larger CH-147 Chinook was procured by the Canadian Forces in the mid-1970s, the Voyageur fleet was converted to Labrador specifications to undertake SAR missions. The refurbished Voyageurs were re-designated as CH-113A Labradors, thus a total of 15 Labradors were ultimately in service.

The Labrador was fitted with a watertight hull for marine landings, a 5,000 kilogram cargo hook and an external rescue hoist mounted over the right front door. It featured a 1,110 kilometer flying range, emergency medical equipment and an 18-person passenger capacity. In multiple instances throughout the 1970s and 1980s, this increased range provided the capability of the CH-113 to provide assistance to U.S. Coast Guard (USCG) missions or perform long range medevacs over distances the USCG helicopters at the time simply could not reach.

In 1981, a mid-life upgrade of the fleet was carried out by Boeing Canada in Arnprior, Ontario. Known as the SAR-CUP (Search and Rescue Capability Upgrade Program), the refit scheme included new instrumentation, a nose-mounted weather radar, a tail-mounted auxiliary power unit, a new high-speed rescue hoist mounted over the side door and front-mounted searchlights. A total of six CH-113s and five CH-113As were upgraded with the last delivered in 1984. Nonetheless, as a search and rescue helicopter it endured heavy use and hostile weather conditions; which had begun to take their toll on the Labrador fleet by the 1990s, resulting in increasing maintenance costs and the need for prompt replacement.

In 1992, it was announced that the Labradors were to be replaced by 15 new helicopters, a variant of the AgustaWestland EH101, designated CH-149 Chimo. The order was subsequently cancelled by the Jean Chrétien Liberal government in 1993, resulting in cancellation penalties, as well as extending the service life of the Labrador fleet. However, in 1998, a CH-113 from CFB Greenwood crashed on Quebec's Gaspé Peninsula while returning from a SAR mission, resulting in the deaths of all crewmembers on board. The crash placed pressure upon the government to procure a replacement, thus an order was placed with the manufacturers of the EH101 for 15 aircraft to perform the search-and-rescue mission, designated CH-149 Cormorant. CH-149 deliveries began in 2003, allowing the last CH-113 to be retired in 2004. In October 2005 Columbia Helicopters of Aurora, Oregon purchased eight of the retired CH-113 Labradors to add to their fleet of 15 Vertol 107-II helicopters.

=== Sweden ===
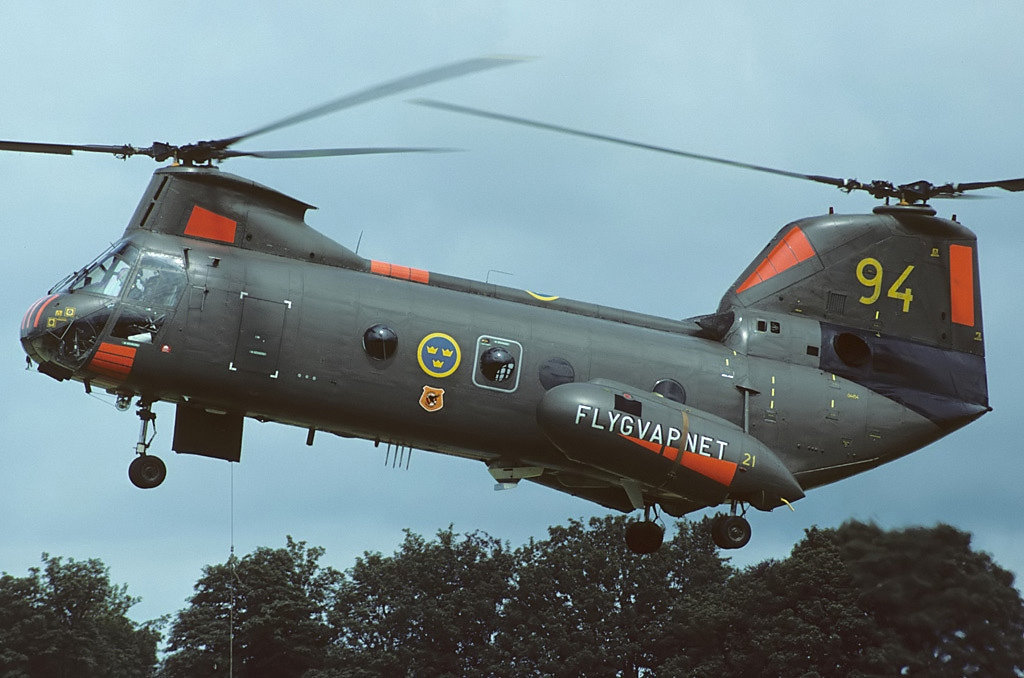
A HKP 4A variant with the Swedish Air Force

In 1963, Sweden procured ten UH-46Bs from the US as a transport and anti-submarine helicopter for the Swedish Armed Forces, designated Hkp 4A. In 1973, a further eight Kawasaki-built KV-107s, which were accordingly designated Hkp 4B, were acquired to replace the older Piasecki H-21. During the Cold War, the fleet's primary missions were anti-submarine warfare and troop transportation. They were also frequently employed in the search and rescue role, most famously during the rescue operation of the MS Estonia after it sank in the Baltic Sea on 28 September 1994. In the 1980s, the Hkp 4A was phased out, having been replaced by the Eurocopter AS332 Super Puma; the later Kawasaki-built Sea Knights continued in operational service until 2011, they were replaced by the UH-60 Black Hawk and NH90.

=== Argentina ===
On 15 September 2023, Argentina's Air Force chief Gen. Xavier Issac briefed the media that Argentina had sent a letter requesting the US to approve the refurbishment of surplus CH-46s currently stored with the 309th Aerospace Maintenance and Regeneration Group in Arizona. The availability of civilian-operated CH-46s was also being explored. They would be used to support Argentina's Antarctic bases. The CH-46s would replace two Mil Mi-171E helicopters acquired in 2010, but now not able to be repaired by Russia due to sanctions from the Russian invasion of Ukraine.

=== Civilian and others ===
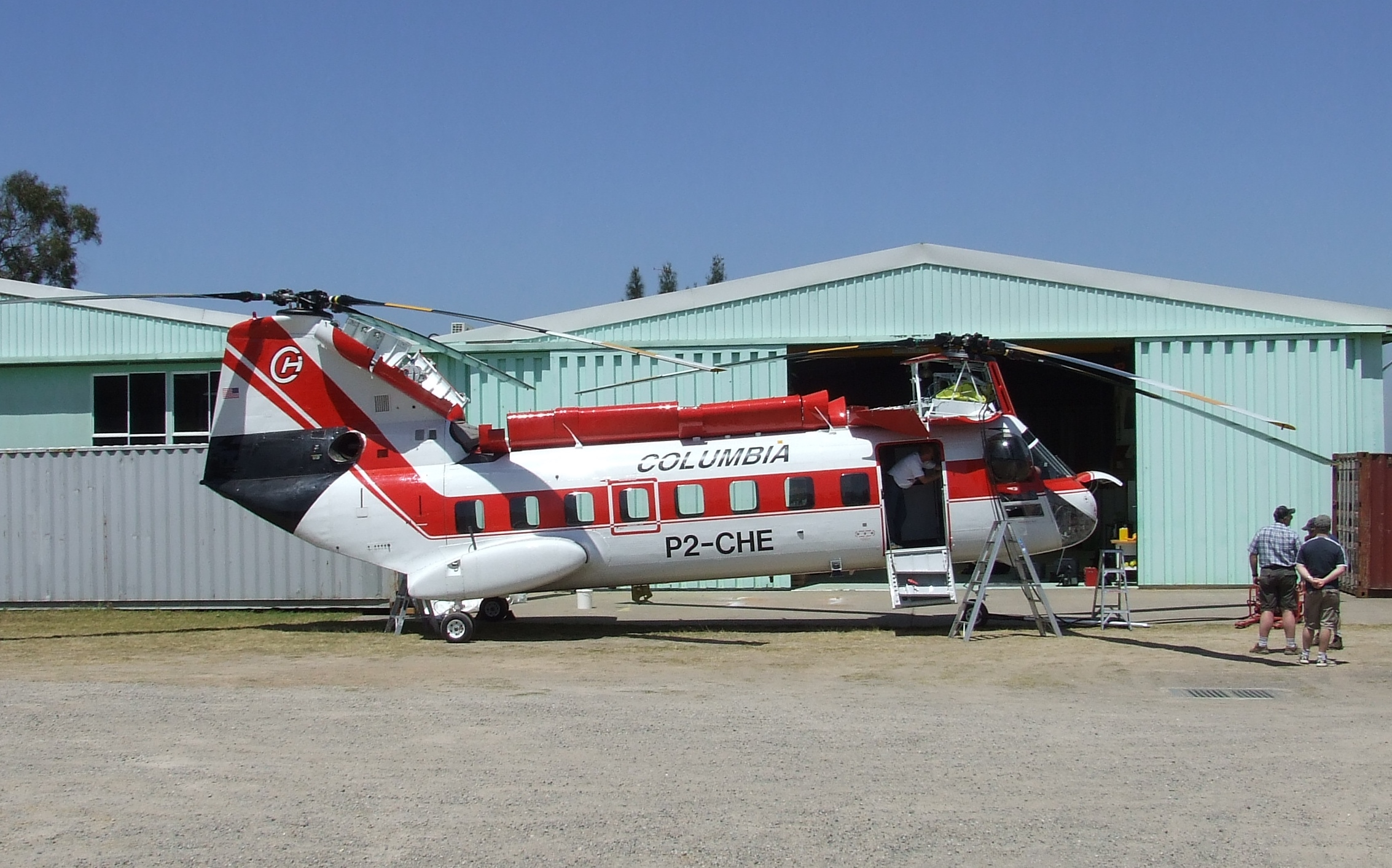
Columbia Helicopters BV 107-II in Papua New Guinea

The civilian version, designated as the BV 107-II Vertol, was developed prior to the military CH-46. It was operated commercially by New York Airways, Pan American World Airways and later on by Columbia Helicopters. Among the diversity of tasks was commuter service in the mid-1960s from the roof of the Pan Am skyscraper in Manhattan to JFK Airport in Queens, pulling a hover barge, and constructing transmission towers for overhead power lines.

In December 2006, Columbia Helicopters purchased the type certificate of the Model 107 from Boeing, with the aim of eventually producing new-build aircraft themselves. In 2023, Columbia Helicopters began a program of purchasing older Model 107-II and CH-46E airframes, and refurbishing them into Model 107-IIs for sale. Columbia Helicopters has also updated old airframes into the Model 107-III.

== Variants ==
=== American versions ===
Model 107
Company model number for basic prototype, one built.
Model 107-II
Commercial airline helicopter. All subsequent commercial aircraft were produced as BV 107-II-2, two built as Boeing Vertol prototypes, five sold to New York Airways, ten supplied to Kawasaki as sub-assemblies or as parts. The second prototype was later rebuilt into a Sea Knight replacement for a lost unit in the Swedish navy she was named Y64 in Swedish service.
Model 107-III
This model has recently been cancelled, although it is still listed on Columbia Helicopters website. Proposed variant, codeveloped by Piasecki and Columbia Helicopters following Columbia's purchase of the type certificate in 2006. Made from surviving 107-II and CH-46E airframes from both Boeing and Kawasaki, purchased primarily from foreign militaries, then remanufactured into -III models. These were intended to begin sales by the end of 2024, but as of 2025 are still listed as upcoming on Columbia's website. Features new manufactured CT58-GE-16 engines, the commercial version of the upgraded engines used for the CH-46E as well as modernized avionics including a glass cockpit.
Model 107M
Company model number for military transport of BV-107/II-2 for the U.S. Marine Corps.
YHC-1A
Vertol Model 107 for test and evaluation by the United States Army. Adopted by the U.S. Marine Corps as the HRB-1. Later redesignated YCH-46C, three built.
HRB-1
Original designation before being renamed as CH-46A before delivery under the 1962 United States Tri-Service aircraft designation system.
CH-46A
Medium-lift assault and cargo transport and SAR helicopter for the USMC, fitted with two 1,250 shp (935 kW) General Electric T58-GE-8 turboshaft engines. Previously designated HRB-1. 160 built for USMC, one static airframe.
UH-46A
Medium-lift utility transport helicopter for the United States Navy. Similar to the CH-46A. 14 built.
HH-46A
Approximately 50 CH-46As were converted into SAR helicopters for the United States Navy base rescue role.
RH-46A
Planned conversion of CH-46As into minesweeping helicopters for the US Navy, none converted. Nine SH-3As were converted to the RH-3A configuration instead.
UH-46B
Development of the CH-46A to specification HX/H2 for the United States Air Force; 12 ordered in 1962, cancelled and Sikorsky S-61R / CH-3C ordered instead.
YCH-46C
YHC-1A redesignated in 1962. United States Army retained two, NASA used one for vertical autonomous landing trials (VALT).

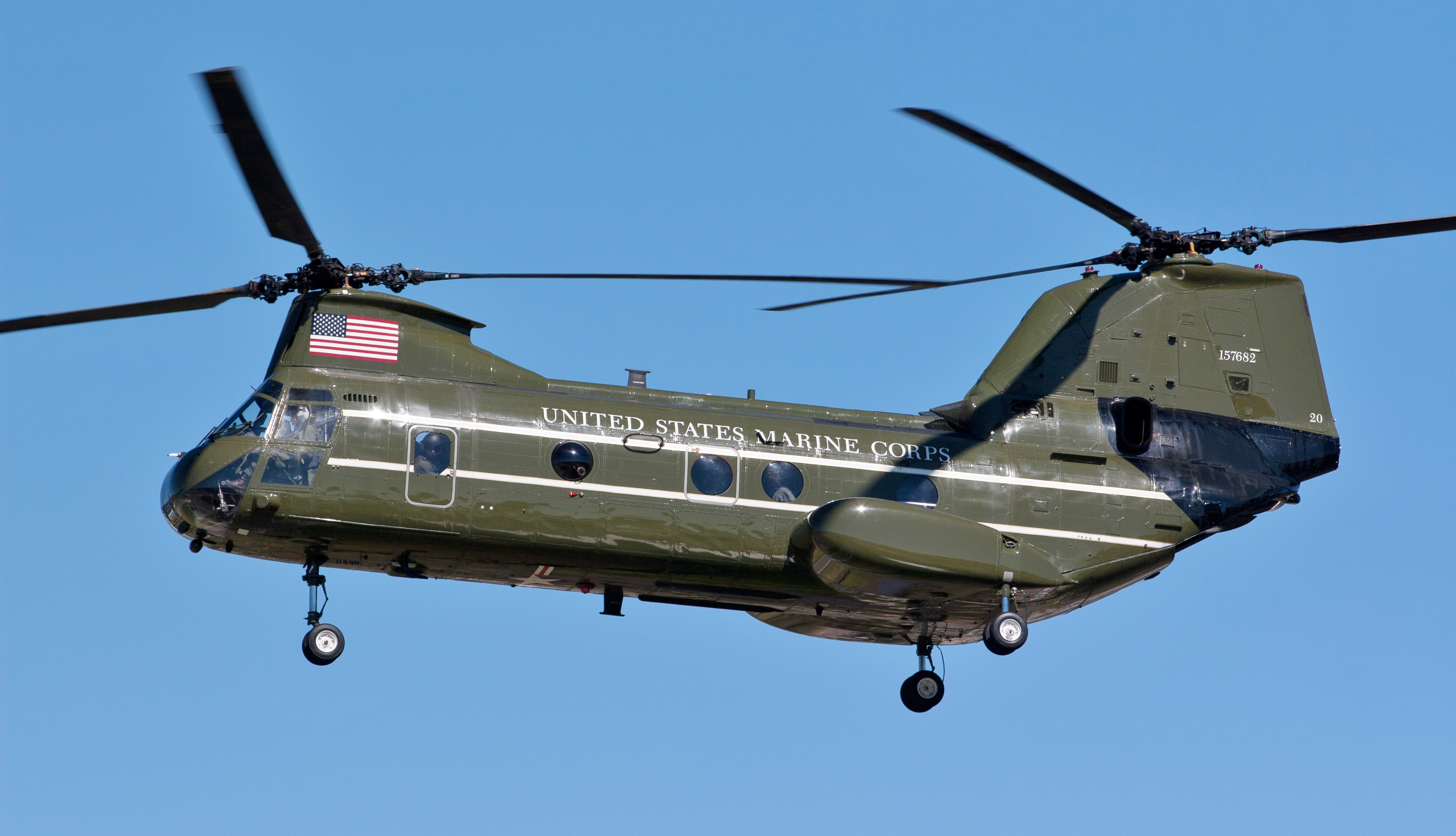
A HMX-1 CH-46D departs Santa Barbara Municipal Airport.

CH-46D
Medium-lift assault and cargo transport helicopter for the USMC, fitted with two 1,400 shp (1,044 kW) General Electric T58-GE-10 turboshaft engines. 266 built.
HH-46D
Surviving HH-46A were upgraded and a small number of UH-46Ds were converted into SAR helicopters. SAR upgrades included the addition of an external rescue hoist near the front crew door and an 18-inch X 18-inch Doppler RADAR system located behind the nose landing gear, which provided for automatic, day/night, over-water hovering capability for at sea rescue. Additionally a "Loud Hailer" was installed opposite the crew entrance door for communicating with downed aviators on the ground or in the water.

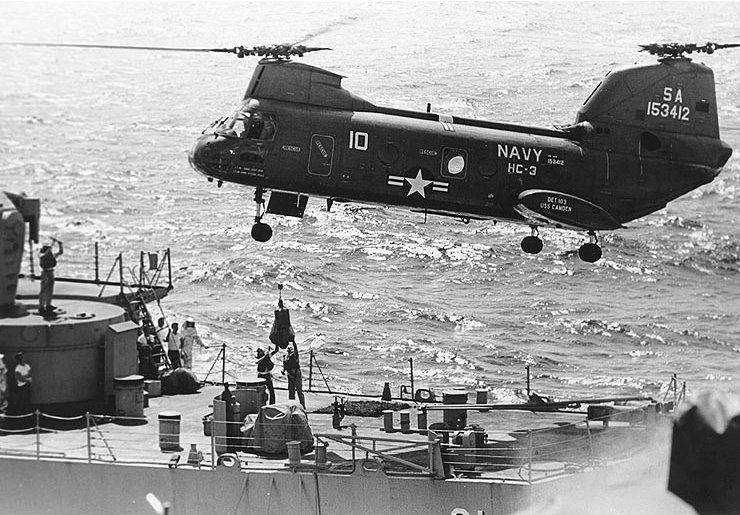
A UH-46D lowers mail to the fantail of USS Decatur.

UH-46D
Medium-lift utility transport helicopter for the US Navy combat supply role. Similar to the CH-46D. Ten built and one conversion from CH-46D.
CH-46E
Approximately 275 -A, -D, and -F airframes were updated to CH-46E standards with improved avionics, hydraulics, drive train and upgraded T58-GE-16 and T58-GE-16/A engines.

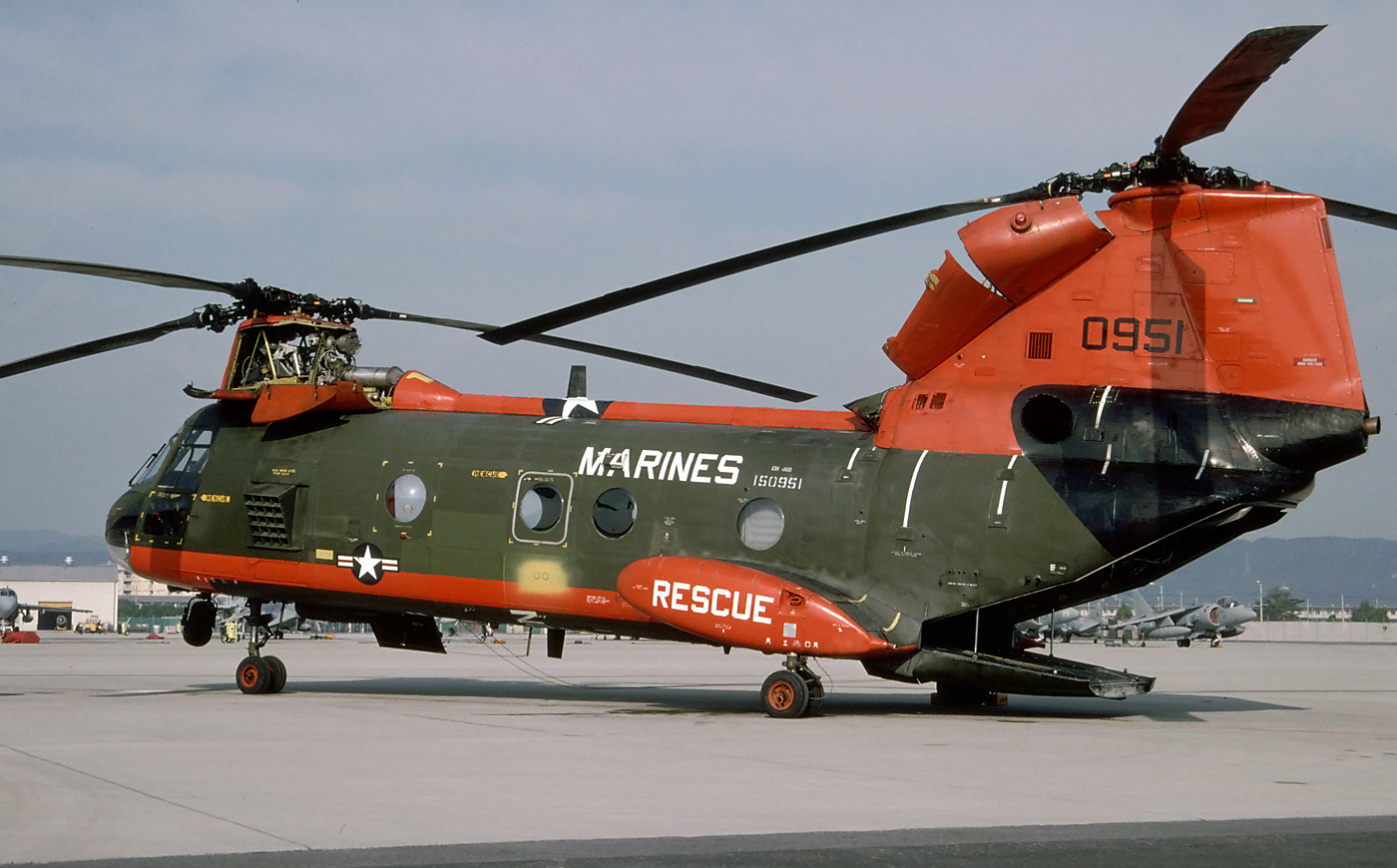
HH-46D used for SAR by the USMC

HH-46E
Three CH-46Es were converted into SAR helicopters for Marine Transport Squadron One (VMR-1) at MCAS Cherry Point.
CH-46F
Improved version of CH-46D, electrical distribution, com/nav update BUNO 154845-157726. Last production model in the United States. 174 built, later reverted to CH-46E.
VH-46F
Unofficial designation of standard CH-46F used by HMX-1 as VIP support transport helicopter.
CH-46X
Replacement helicopter based on the Boeing Model 360, this Advance Technology Demonstrator from the 1980s never entered production. The aircraft relied heavily on composites for its construction and had a beefier drive train to handle the twin Avco-Lycoming AL5512 engines (4,200 shp).
XH-49
Original designation of UH-46B.

=== Canadian versions ===
CH-113 Labrador
Search and rescue version of the Model 107-II-9 for the Royal Canadian Air Force
CH-113A Voyageur
Assault and utility transport version of the Model 107-II-28 for the Canadian Army. Later converted to CH-113A Labrador when the Canadian Forces acquired the CH-47 Chinook

=== Japanese versions ===
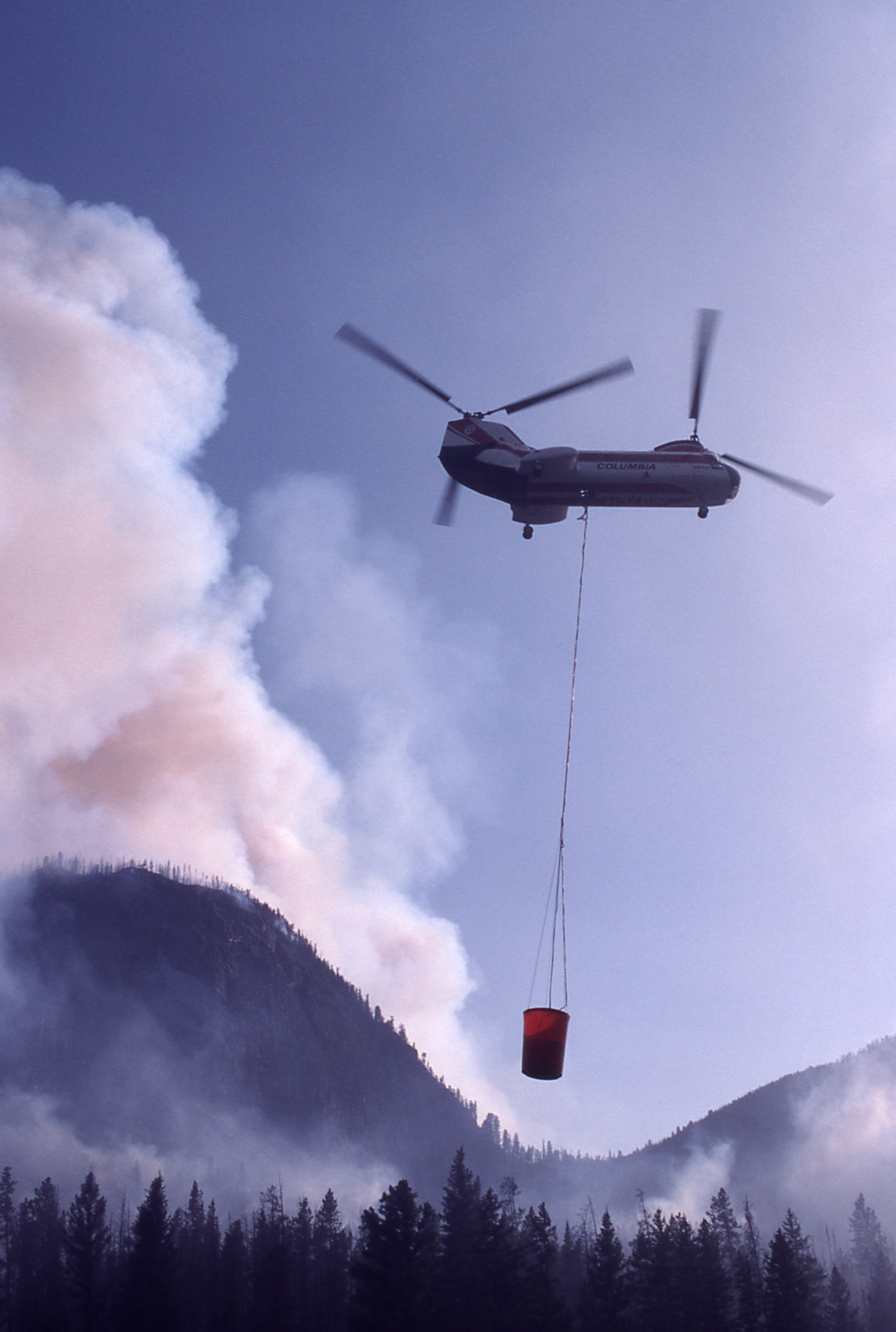
CHI Kawasaki Vertol KV-107II slinging a bucket during the Yellowstone fires of 1988

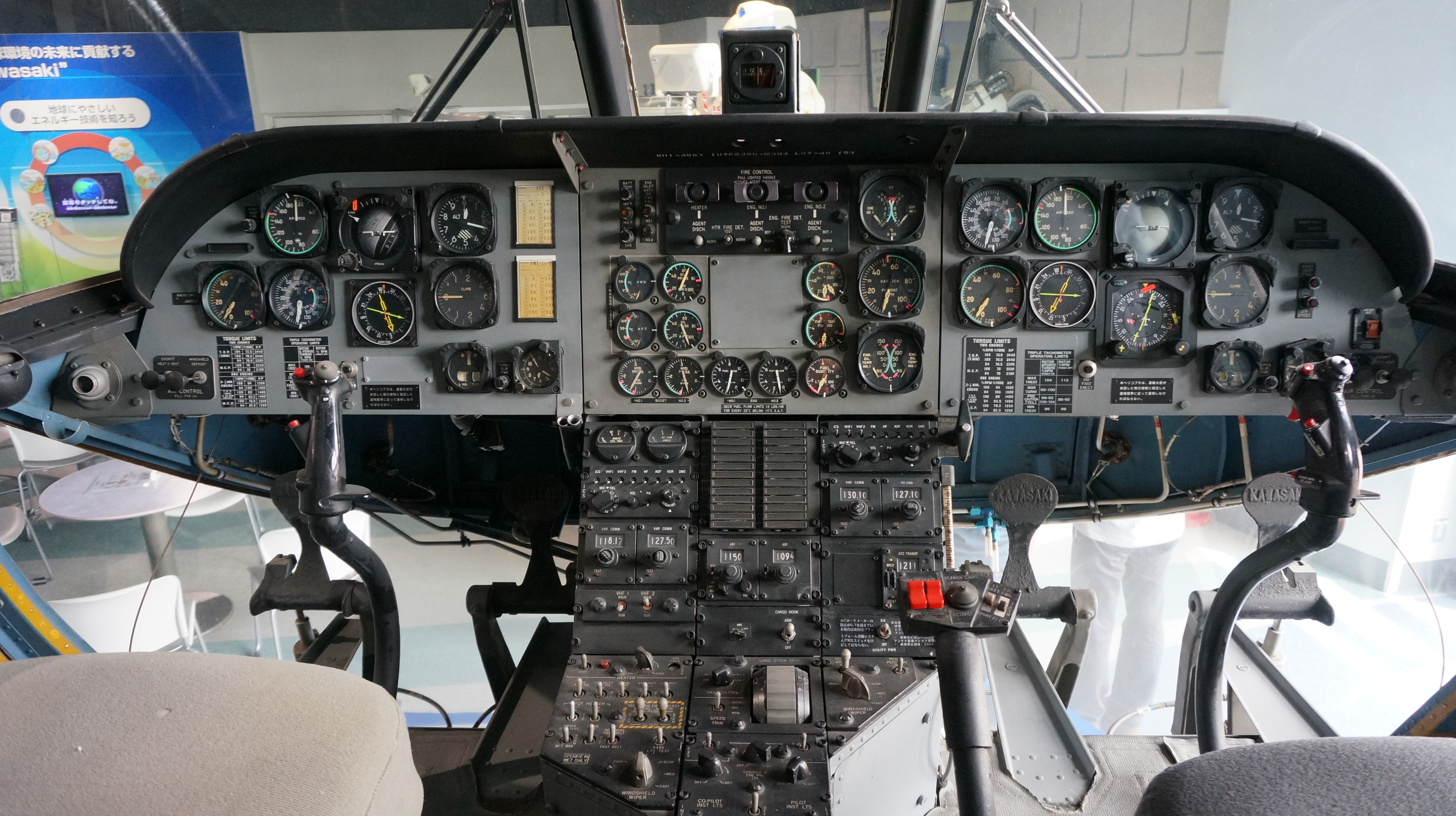
Cockpit of a 107II manufactured by Kawasaki

KV-107II-1 (CT58-110-1)
Utility transport version, one built from Boeing-supplied kits.
KV-107II-2 (CT58-110-1)
Commercial airline version, nine built from Boeing-supplied kits.
KV-107IIA-2 (CT58-140-1)
Improved version of the KV-107/II-2, three built.
KV-107II-3 (CT58-110-1)
Minesweeping version for the Japan Maritime Self-Defense Force (JMSDF), two built.
KV-107IIA-3 (CT58-IHI-10-M1)
Uprated version of the KV-107/II-3, seven built.
KV-107II-4 (CT58-IHI-110-1)
Assault and utility transport version for the Japan Ground Self-Defense Force (JGSDF), 41 built.
KV-107II-4A (CT58-IHI-110-1)
VIP version of the KV-107/II-4, one built.
KV-107IIA-4 (CT58-IHI-140-1)
Uprated version of the KV-107/II-4, 18 built.
KV-107II-5 (CT58-IHI-110-1)
Long-range SAR version for the Japan Air Self-Defense Force (JASDF), 17 built.
KV-107IIA-5 (CT58-IHI-104-1)
Uprated version of the KV-107II-5, 35 built.
KV-107II-7 (CT58-110-1)
VIP transport version, one built.
KV-107II-16
HKP 4C for Swedish Navy. Powered by Rolls-Royce Gnome H.1200 turboshaft engines, eight built.
KV-107IIA-17 (CT58-140-1)
Long-range transport version for the Tokyo Metropolitan Police Department, one built.
KV-107IIA-SM-1 (CT58-IHI-140-1M1)
Firefighting helicopter for Saudi Arabia, seven built.
KV-107IIA-SM-2 (CT58-IHI-140-1M1)
Aeromedical and rescue helicopter for Saudi Arabia, four built.
KV-107IIA-SM-3 (CT58-IHI-140-1M1)
VIP transport helicopter for Saudi Arabia, two built.
KV-107IIA-SM-4 (CT58-IHI-140-1M1)
Air ambulance helicopter for Saudi Arabia, three built.

=== Swedish versions ===
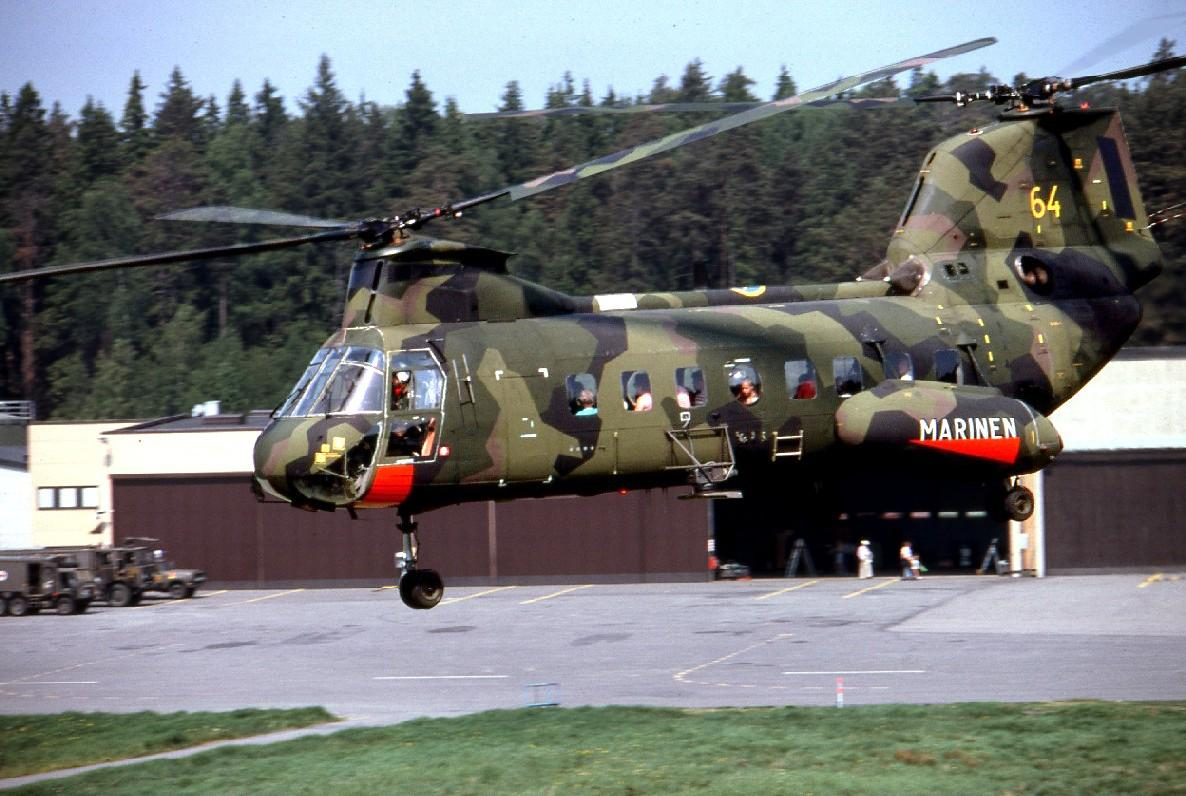
Boeing-Vertol civil prototype in service with the Swedish Navy as an HKP 4B, 1981

HKP 4A
Boeing Vertol 107-II-14, used originally by Air Force for search and rescue, ten built
HKP 4B
Boeing Vertol 107-II-15, mine-layer/antisubmarine warfare/search and rescue helicopter for Navy, three built and one conversion from Boeing-Vertol civil prototype
HKP 4C
Kawasaki KV-107-II-16, advanced mine-layer/ASW/SAR helicopter for Navy, eight built
HKP 4D
Rebuilt HKP 4A for Navy as SAR/ASW helicopter, four conversions

== Operators ==
Canada

- Helifor Canada

United States

- Columbia Helicopters
- Sky Aviation Corp

=== Former operators ===
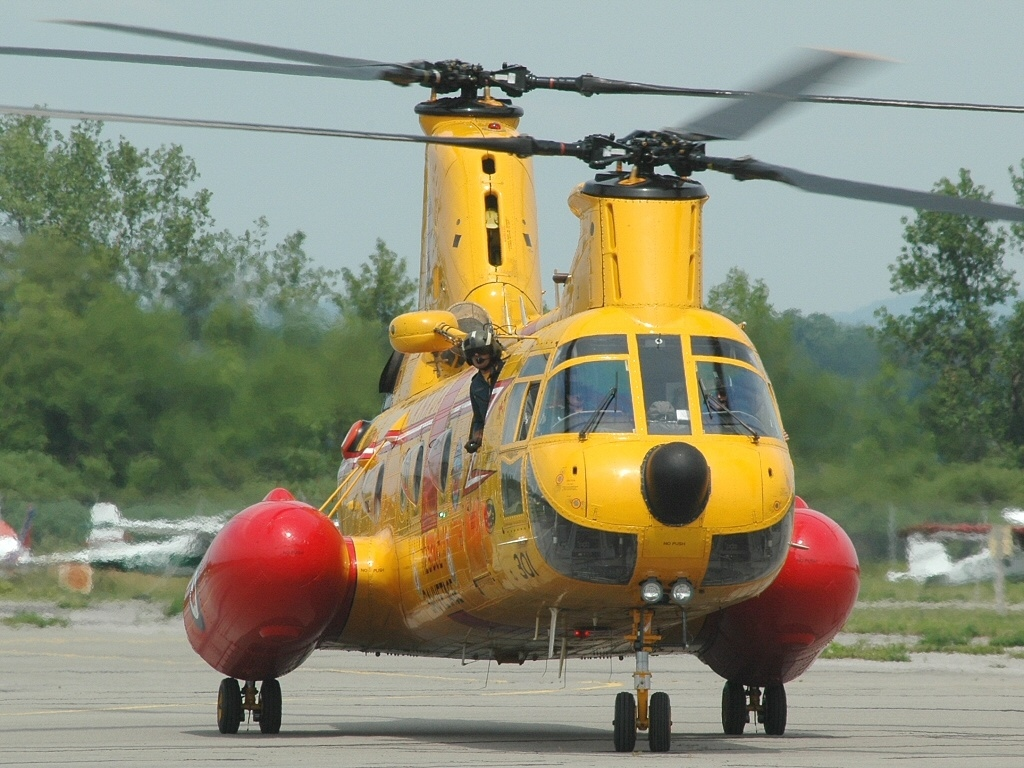
Canadian CH-113 Labrador

Canada

- Canadian Army - Voyageur variant (later as CH-113A)
- Royal Canadian Air Force - both CH-113 and CH-113A
  - 103 Search and Rescue Squadron
  - 413 Transport and Rescue Squadron
  - 102 Composite Unit / 424 Transport and Rescue Squadron
  - 442 Transport and Rescue Squadron
  - 450 Transport Helicopter Squadron

Japan

- Japan Air Self-Defense Force
- Japan Ground Self-Defense Force
- Japan Maritime Self-Defense Force
- Tokyo Metropolitan Police Department

Saudi Arabia

- Ministry of Interior

Sweden

- Swedish Air Force
- Swedish Navy

Thailand

- Royal Thai Army

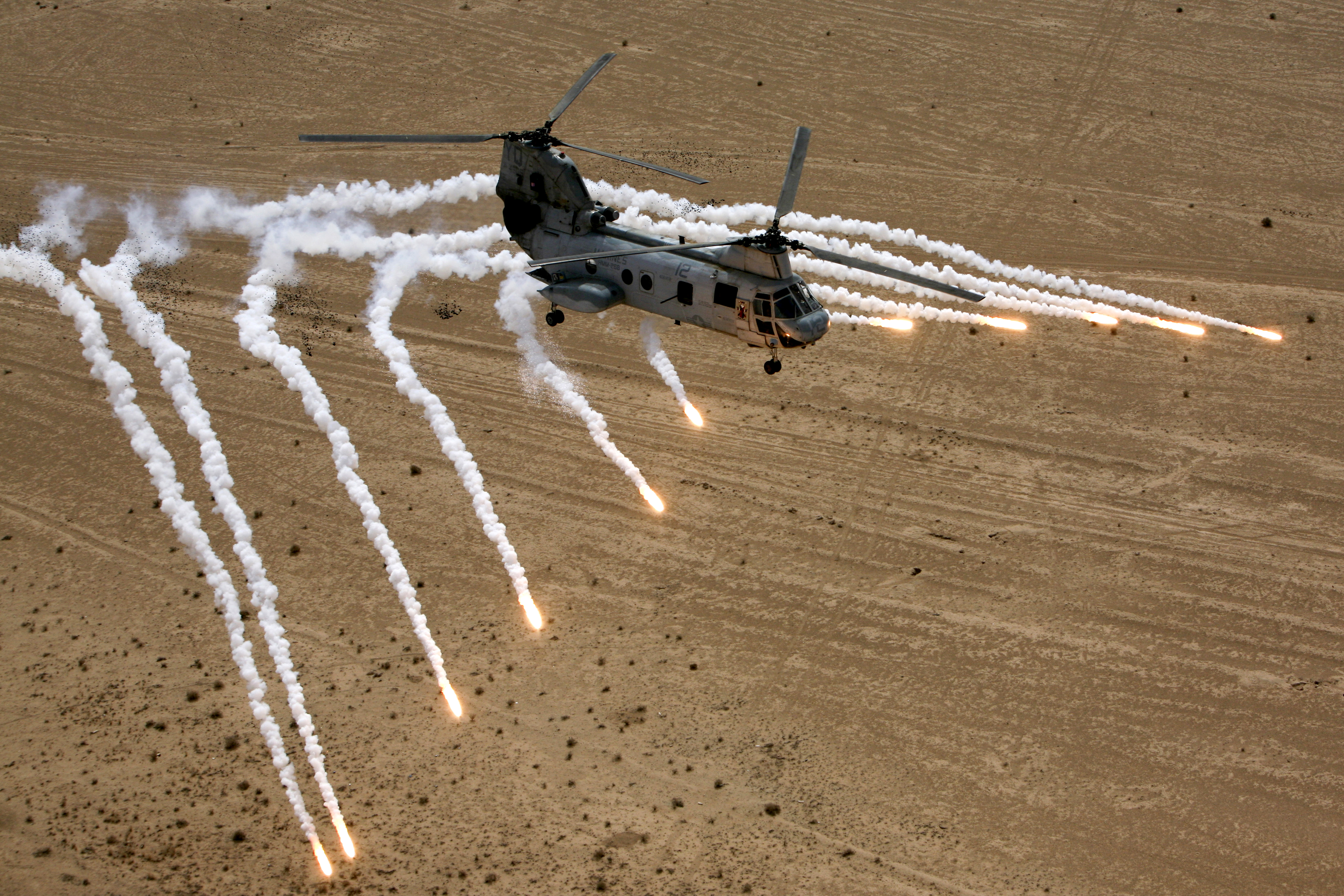
A CH-46E of VMM-268 deploying its onboard countermeasures during the Iraq War, 2008.

United States

- New York Airways
- Pan American Airways
- United States Marine Corps
  - HMX-1
  - HMM-262
  - HMM-265
  - HMM-268
  - HMM-364
  - HMM-764
  - HMM-774
  - HMMT-164
  - VMR-1
- United States Navy
- United States Department of State
  - State Department Air Wing

== Notable accidents and incidents ==
A CH-46 crash in 1987

A CH-46 crash in 1999

- On 14 October 1963 New York Airways Flight 600, a Boeing Vertol 107, registration N6673D, crashed shortly after takeoff from Idlewild Airport (now JFK) en route to Newark via Wall Street. All three passengers and all three crew members died. The accident was caused by mechanical failure due to contaminated lubricants.
- On 15 July 1966 in the Vietnam War during Operation Hastings, two CH-46As of HMM-164 collided at Landing Zone Crow while another, crashed into a tree avoiding the first two, resulting in 2 Marines killed. Another CH-46 of HMM-265 was shot down at the LZ later that day resulting in a further 13 Marine deaths.
- On 4 June 1968, CH-46D BuNo 152533 of HMM-165 was hit by anti-aircraft fire at Landing Zone Loon and crashed killing 13 Marines.
- On 14 March 1969, CH-46D BuNo 154841 of HMM-161 was hit by a B-40 rocket as it conducted a resupply and medevac mission at Landing Zone Sierra, killing 12 Marines and 1 Navy corpsman.
- On 10 May 1996, a CH-46E collided in mid-air with a Bell AH-1W attack helicopter, killing fourteen (twelve Marines, one Navy sailor, and one Army soldier) aboard the two helicopters. The pilots of the CH-46E were injured. Both helicopters, of HMM-266, were operating from USS Saipan and were participating in Operation Purple Star, a joint exercise involving troops from the U.S. and the UK at Camp Lejeune, North Carolina.
- On 2 October 1998, a CH-113 Labrador crashed near Marsoui, Quebec, after an inflight fire. All six crewmembers were killed.
- On 9 December 1999, a CH-46D Sea Knight BuNo 154790 of HMM-166 crashed during a boarding exercise off the coast of San Diego, California, killing seven U.S. Marines. The pilot landed the CH-46 short on the deck of the USNS Pecos, causing the left rear tire and strut to become entangled in the safety netting at the back of the ship, which caused it to plunge into the ocean.

== Aircraft on display ==
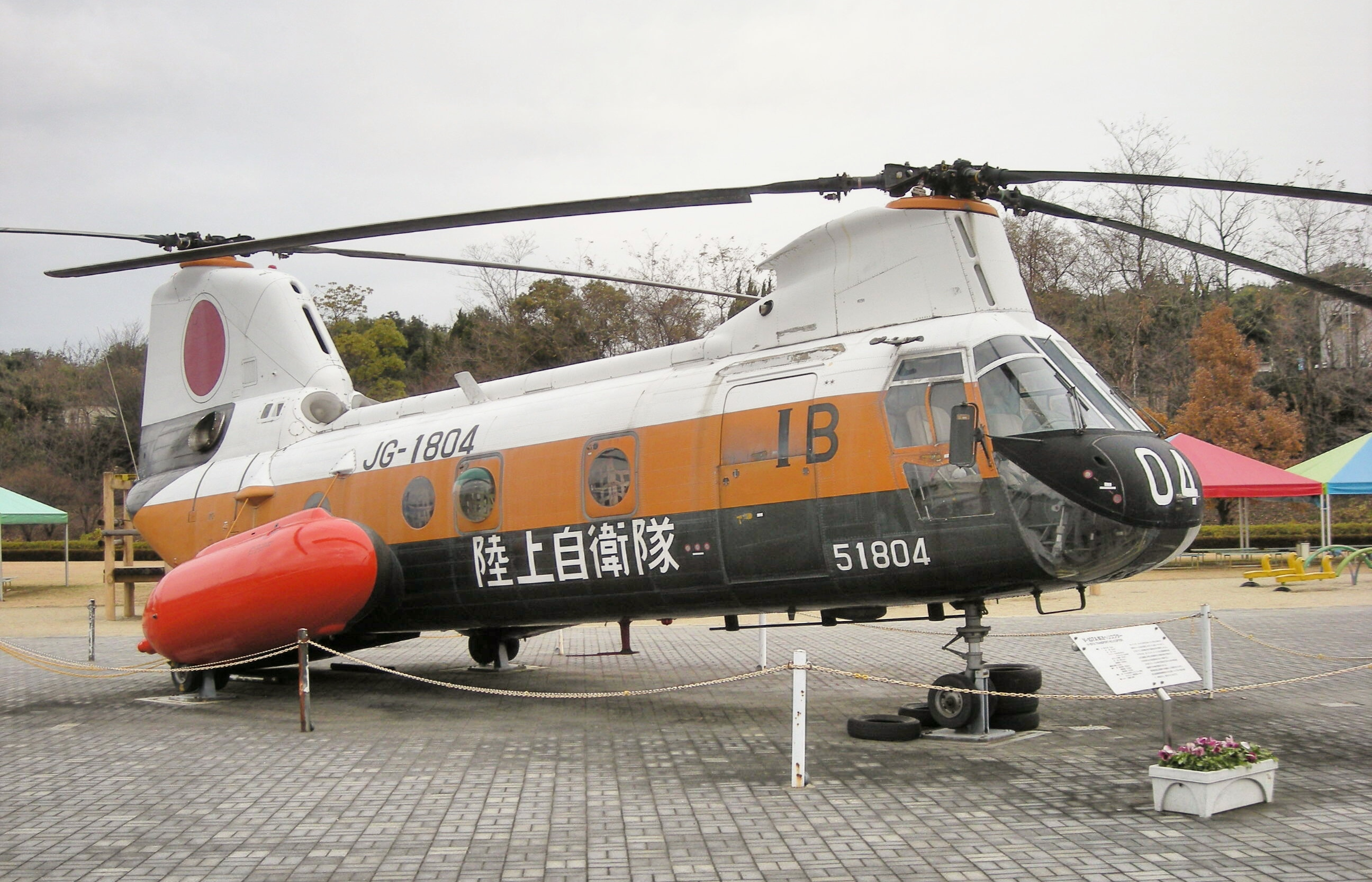
A KV-107 with the JGSDF on display at the Kakamigahara Aerospace Museum

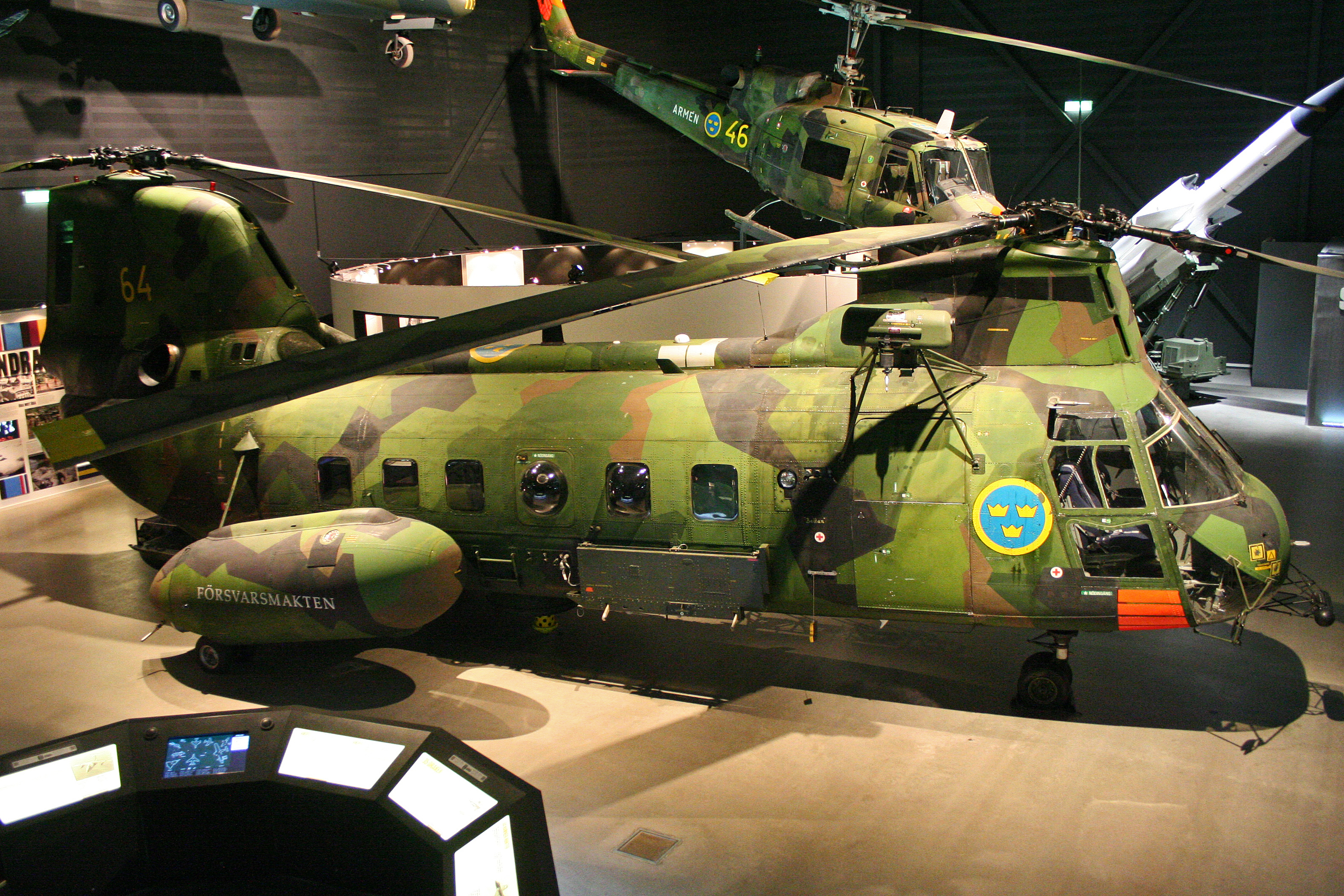
A HKP 4B of the Swedish Armed Forces on display at the Swedish Air Force Museum, Malmen, Sweden

A variety of CH-46 are on display at museums in Canada, Japan, Sweden, and the United States.

Canada

- Canada Aviation and Space Museum – Labrador 11301
- Comox Air Force Museum – Labrador 11310
- National Air Force Museum of Canada – Labrador 11315
- Greenwood Military Aviation Museum – Labrador 11308

Japan

- Japan Air Self Defense Force Hamamatsu Air Base Publication Center, Hamamatsu, Shizuoka, Japan
- Kakamigahara Aerospace Science Museum, Kakamigahara, Gifu, Japan
- Kawasaki Vertol 107-II – Kawasaki Good Times World, within Kobe Maritime Museum, Kobe, Hyōgo, Japan.

Sweden

- Aeroseum, Gothenburg, Sweden – Boeing Vertol/Kawasaki KV-107-II (CH-46), Hkp 4C, c/n 4093, Fv 04072 "72"
- Swedish Air Force Museum, Linköping Sweden. Prototype BV-107-II N6679D. Bought used from Boeing in 1970.

United States

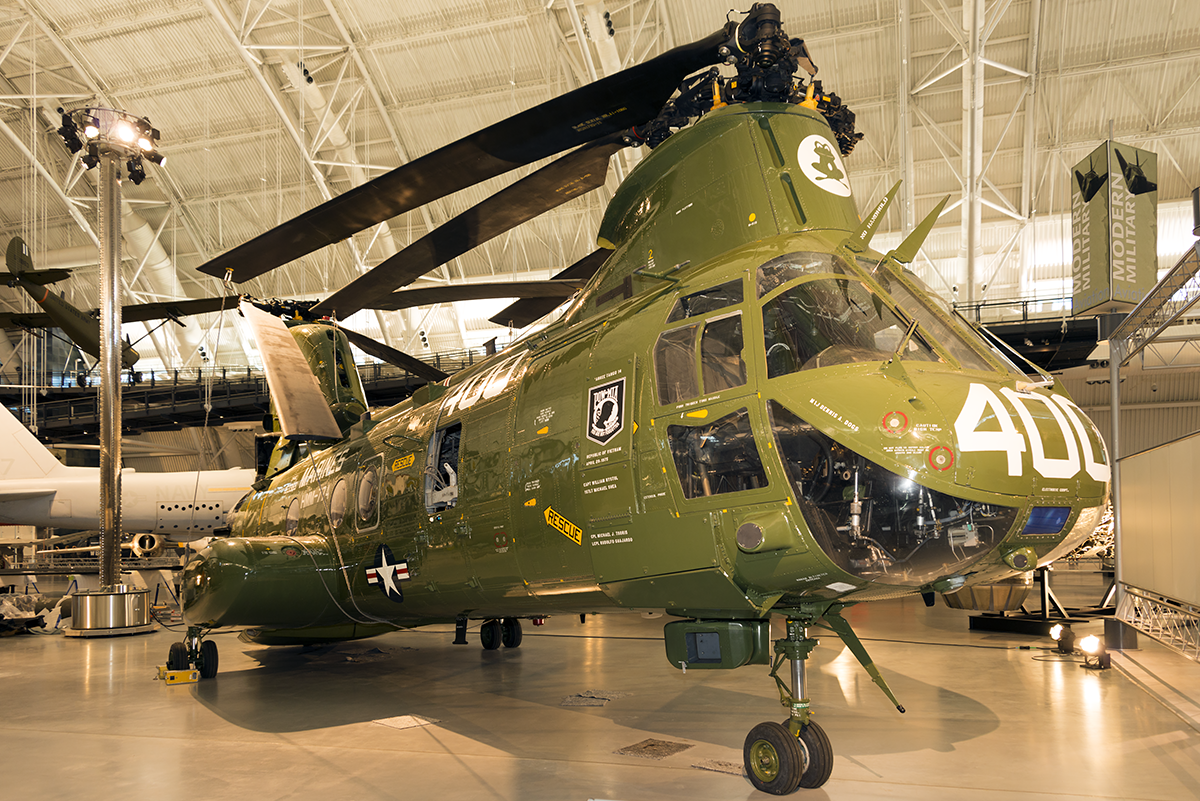
Last CH-46 of Marine Corps HMM-774 at Steven F. Udvar-Hazy Center

- 153962, 154853, 155316, 154810, 157678, 157682 – National United States Armed Forces Museum in Houston, Texas displays four Marine Corps CH-46Es in various configurations including an HMX-1 aircraft and an HH-46E "Pedro" configured for search and rescue '01' from VMR-1 Cherry Point MCAS, NC.
- 150954 – USS Midway Museum in San Diego, California displays HH-46A (c/n 2040) as U.S. Navy SA-46 of HC-3 on one side and VR-46 of HC-11 on the other.
- 151952 – National Museum of Naval Aviation in Pensacola, FL displays HH-46D (c/n 2102) as U.S. Navy HW-00 of HC-6.
- 152578 - Patuxent River Naval Air Museum in Lexington Park, Maryland displays CH-46E 152578 (c/n 2200) as HX-21 HX-578.
- 153389 – Carolinas Aviation Museum, Charlotte, North Carolina, has Raymond Clausen's Medal of Honor mission CH-46E (c/n 2287) as HMM-263 EG-16. The rear fuselage of BuNo 153335 was used in restoration.
- 153986 – National Museum of the Marine Corps Quantico, Virginia has a walk-through exhibit containing the rear half of a CH-46D displayed as the former BuNo 153986 (c/n 2337) YK-13 from HMM-364 with their logo, The Purple Fox. The front half of the aircraft was used as a training aid display for HMX-1.
- 153402 – New River Aviation Memorial at the front gate of Marine Corps Air Station New River, (part of Camp Lejeune) in Jacksonville, North Carolina – CH-46E (c/n 2300) as YS-02 of HMM-162 on one side and HMM-261 on the other.
- 153369 – National Air and Space Museum at the Steven F. Udvar-Hazy Center in Chantilly, Virginia has CH-46D (c/n 2265) displayed as MQ-400 of HMM-774. This aircraft is on loan from National Museum of the Marine Corps, Quantico, Virginia. The aircraft was last flown on 1 August 2015 at the Marine Corps' formal sunset ceremony for the type which was the last public showing of an airworthy Marine Corps CH-46.
- 154009 – Patriots Point Naval and Maritime Museum in Mount Pleasant, South Carolina, has CH-46E (c/n 2360) of HMM-164.
- 154803 – Flying Leatherneck Aviation Museum, Irvine, California, US, has CH-46E (c/n 2410) as YS-09 Lady Ace 09 of HMM-165. The CH-46 took part in Operation Frequent Wind and was used to evacuate Ambassador Graham Martin, the last United States Ambassador to South Vietnam from the United States Embassy, Saigon on 30 April 1975.
- 156427 – Veterans Museum Dyersburg Army Air Base in Halls, Tennessee has YP-05, a CH-46E wearing the Evileyes of HMM-163.
- 156469 – Pima Air and Space Museum in Tucson, Arizona. Started life as a CH-46F, and was converted to the CH-46E standard sometime between 1975 and 1979. It is displayed as YP-12 of HMM-163 "Evileyes" Scheme; accurate to this airframe. (On loan from the National Museum of the Marine Corps.)
- 157667 – American Helicopter Museum & Education Center in West Chester, Pennsylvania displays a CH-46E that served with HMT-204, HMM-162, HMM-263, HMM-266, HMM-268, HMM-364 and HMM-164. On loan from the National Museum of Naval Aviation, Pensacola, FL.
- 157688 – Classic Rotors Rotorcraft Museum in Ramona, CA, displays HH-46E '02' from VMR-1 Cherry Point MCAS, NC.

== Specifications (CH-46E) ==

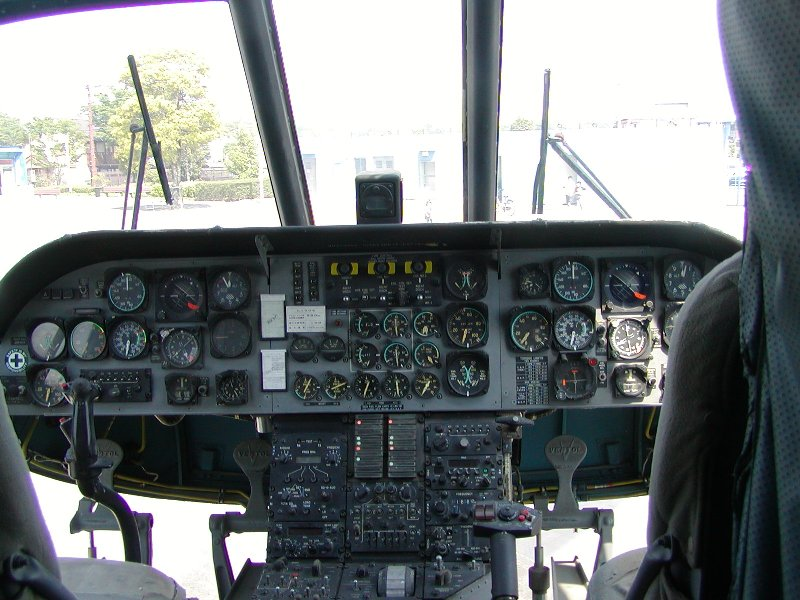
CH-46 cockpit

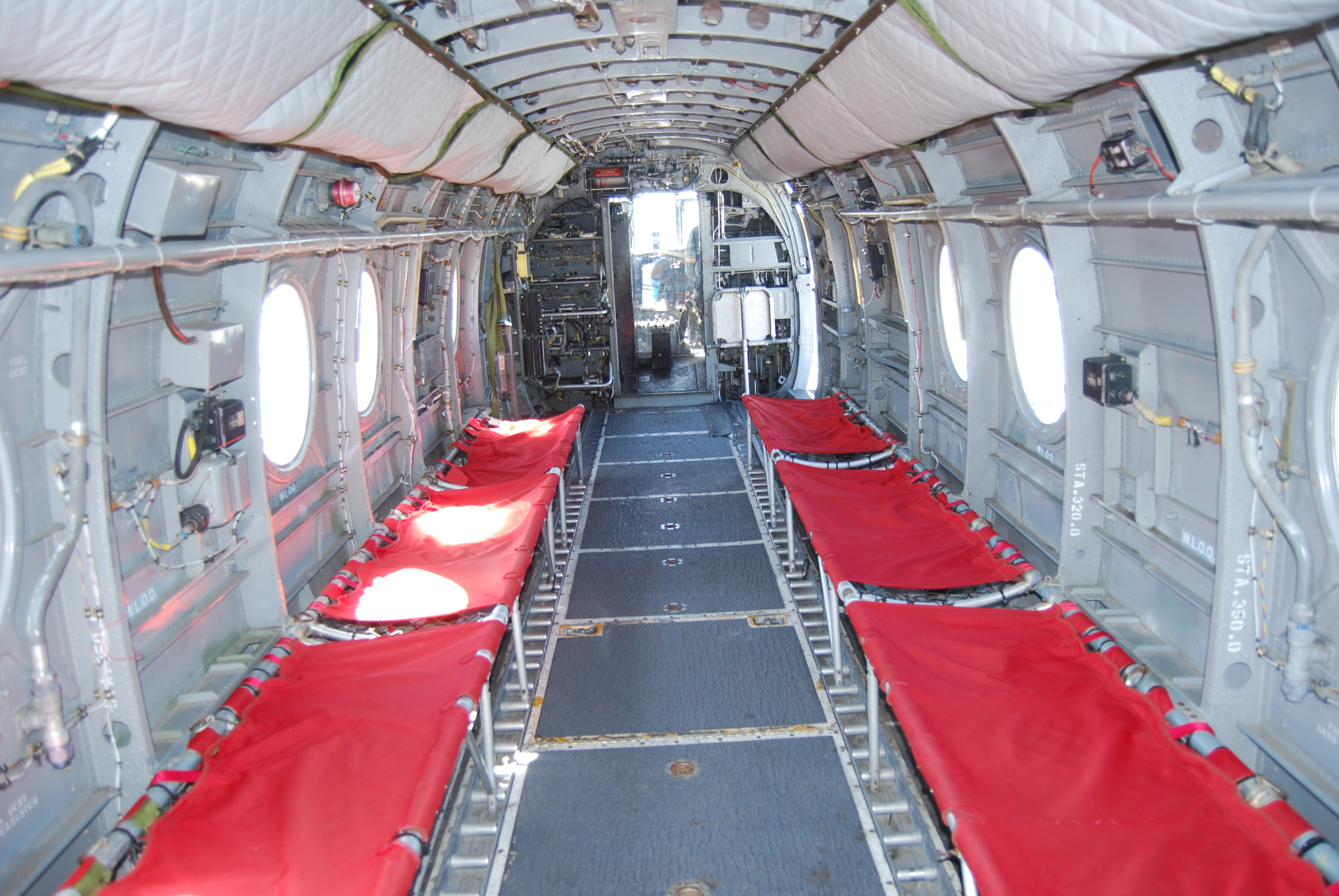
Cabin, looking towards cockpit

Data from The International Directory of Military Aircraft, 2002/2003, The Complete Encyclopedia of World Aircraft : Boeing Vertol Model 107 (H-46 Sea Knight), Encyclopedia of world military aircraft : Volume One

General characteristics

- Crew: 5: two pilots, one crew chief, one aerial gunner/observer, one tail gunner
- Capacity:
  - 24 troops or
  - 15 stretchers and two attendants or
  - 7,000 lb (3,200 kg)
- Length: 44 ft 10 in (13.67 m) (fuselage)

83 ft 4 in (25.40 m) (rotors turning)

- Height: 16 ft 9 in (5.11 m) to top of rear rotor head
- Empty weight: 15,537 lb (7,047 kg)
- Gross weight: 24,300 lb (11,022 kg)
- Max takeoff weight: 24,300 lb (11,022 kg)
- Fuel capacity: 350 US gal (290 imp gal; 1,300 L) internal
- Powerplant: 2 × General Electric T58-GE-16 turboshaft engines, 1,870 shp (1,390 kW) each
- Main rotor diameter: 2 × 50 ft (15 m)
- Main rotor area: 3,926.99 sq ft (364.829 m^{2})
- Rotor blade section: root: Boeing VR-7; tip: Boeing VR-8

Performance

- Maximum speed: 144 kn (166 mph, 267 km/h) at sea level
- Cruise speed: 143 kn (165 mph, 265 km/h) maximum at sea level
- Range: 550 nmi (630 mi, 1,020 km) with 2,400 lb (1,100 kg) payload
- Ferry range: 600 nmi (690 mi, 1,100 km)
- Service ceiling: 17,000 ft (5,200 m)
- Hover ceiling IGE: 9,500 ft (2,900 m)
- Hover ceiling OGE: 5,750 ft (1,750 m)
- Rate of climb: 1,715 ft/min (8.71 m/s)
- Disk loading: 4.43 lb/sq ft (21.6 kg/m^{2})
- Power/mass: 0.215 hp/lb (0.353 kW/kg)

Armament

- Guns: Two door-mounted 0.5 in (12.7 mm) GAU-15/A machine guns (optional), one ramp-mounted 7.62 mm (0.30 in) M240D machine gun (optional)

== See also ==
Related development

- Boeing CH-47 Chinook
- Boeing Model 360

Aircraft of comparable role, configuration, and era

- Piasecki HUP Retriever
- Sikorsky S-61
- Yakovlev Yak-24

Related lists

- List of active United States military aircraft
- List of military aircraft of the United States
- List of military electronics of the United States
