= Honeywell T55 =

Family of turboprop aircraft engines

T55
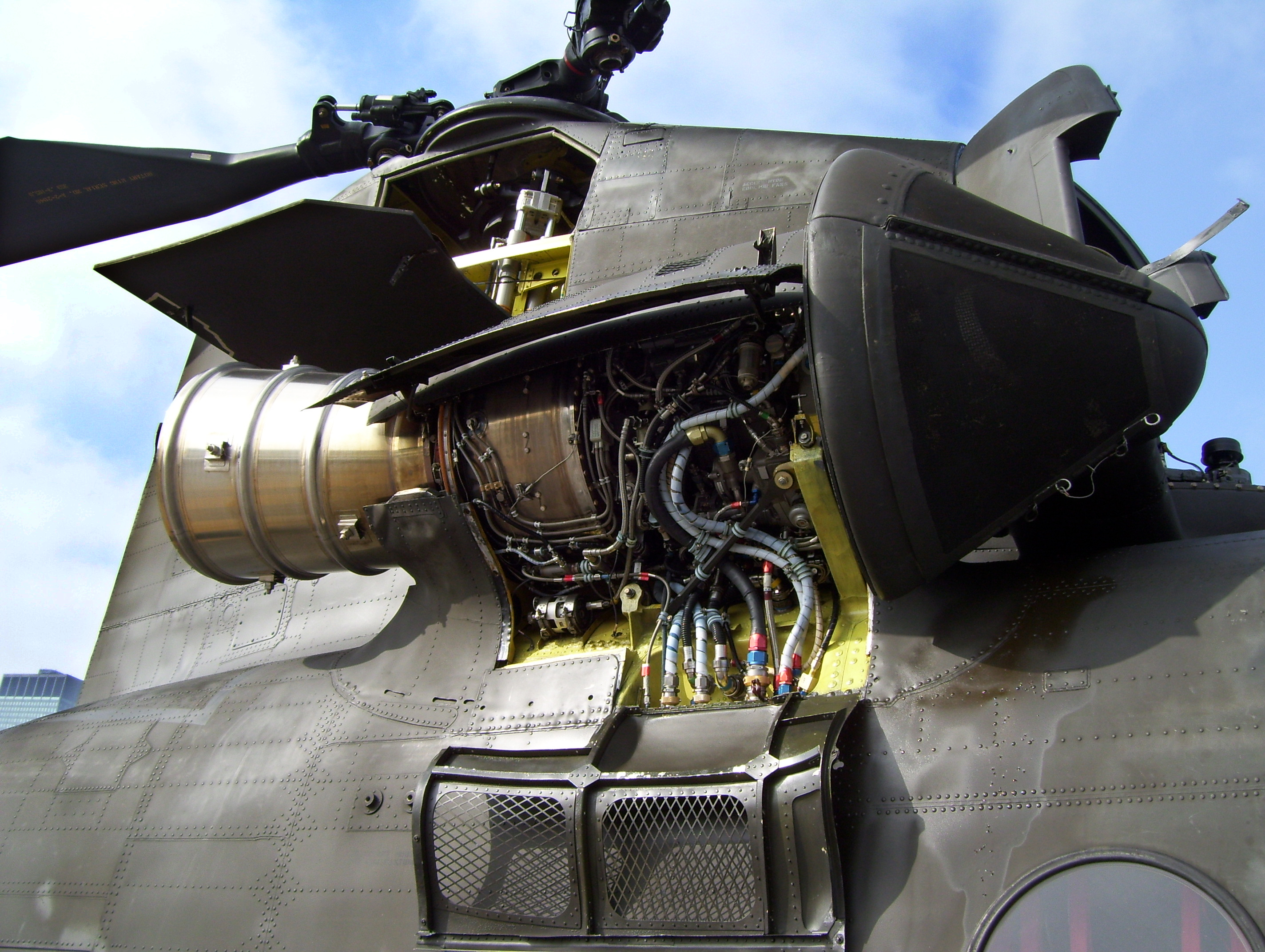
- Honeywell's T55-GA-714A turboshaft engine on a CH-47 Chinook
- Type: Turboshaft
- National origin: United States
- Manufacturer: Lycoming Engines; Honeywell Aerospace
- First run: April 1955
- Major applications: Bell 309 KingCobra; Boeing CH-47 Chinook; Piper PA-48 Enforcer
- Number built: 6,000+
- Developed from: Lycoming T53
- Developed into: Lycoming ALF 502

The Honeywell T55 (formerly Lycoming; company designation LTC-4) is a turboshaft engine used on American helicopters and fixed-wing aircraft (in turboprop form) since the 1950s, and in unlimited hydroplanes since the 1980s. As of 2021, more than 6,000 of these engines have been built. It is produced by Honeywell Aerospace, a division of Honeywell based in Phoenix, Arizona, and was originally designed by the Turbine Engine Division of Lycoming Engines in Stratford, Connecticut, as a scaled-up version of the smaller Lycoming T53. The T55 serves as the engine on several major applications including the CH-47-Chinook, the Bell 309, and the Piper PA-48 Enforcer. The T55 also serves as the core of the Lycoming ALF 502 turbofan and the TF series of industrial and marine gas turbines, now produced by Vericor Power Systems. Since the T55 was first developed, progressive increases in airflow, overall pressure ratio, and turbine inlet temperature have more than tripled the power output of the engine.

== Variants ==
=== Civil and experimental variants ===
LTC4A-1
Turboprop engine with a power rating of 1,600 shp (1,200 kW) and dry weight of 695 lb (315 kg); was designated the YT55-L-1 after its 50-hour qualification test was completed in December 1957
LTC4B-1
LTC4B-2
Geared turboshaft engine with an initial power rating of 1,800 shp (1,300 kW); completed a 50-hour qualification test demonstrating 2,050 shp (1,530 kW) in March 1958, and then was designated as the YT55-L-3 with a power rating of 1,900 shp (1,400 kW)
LTC4B-7
Ungeared version of the LTC4B-2, with an integral oil cooler and tank; demonstrated 2,500 shp (1,900 kW) in January 1960; the higher power rating resulted from increased turbine inlet temperatures, which came from small modifications learned from YT55-L-1 and YT55-L-3 development experience; completed 50-hour qualification test at 2,200 shp (1,600 kW) power rating in February 1960, after which it was designated as the YT55-L-5; completed its 150-hour qualification test in September 1960, after which its designation changed from YT55-L-5 to the T55-L-5 production engine
LTC4B-8
Civil designation for the T55-L-7 military engine; dry weight of 580 lb (260 kg) also powered the original Bell 214 helicopter as a 2,930 shp (2,180 kW) engine in 1970
LTC4B-8D
2,950 shp (2,200 kW) engine powering the Bell 214A helicopter; uprated from the T55-L-7C; 433 engines produced between 1973 and 1977 for this military helicopter
LTC4B-11
similar to L-7 with two-stage gas generator turbine
LTC4B-12
Turboprop engine with a power rating of 4,600 shp (3,400 kW) and a weight of 680 lb (310 kg), 10 lb (4.5 kg) more than the T55-L-11 that it is derived from; brake-specific fuel consumption (BSFC) of 0.504 lb/(hp⋅h) (307 g/kWh)
LTC4C-2
Civil designation for the YT55-L-1A military turboprop engine
LTC4G-3
Turboprop engine with a maximum and normal power rating of 2,445 and 2,100 shp (1,823 and 1,566 kW); high-performance version of the T55-L-1
LTC4G-4
LTC4K
9-stage compressor
LTC4K-2
LTC4M-1
LTC4R-1
Turboprop engine with a power rating of 3,690 shp (2,750 kW), weight of 920 lb (420 kg), pressure ratio of 8.2:1, and a BSFC of 0.52 lb/(hp⋅h) (320 g/kWh)
PLF1A-2
First experimental high-bypass turbofan engine produced in the United States, initially run in February 1964; two produced; used the engine core of the T55-L-7; 40 in diameter (100 cm) geared fan stage, producing a static thrust of 4,320 lb (1,960 kg); predecessor of the ALF 502 and LF 507 production turbofans; bypass ratio of 6:1; weight of 825 lb (374 kg) maximum pressure ratio of 1.4:1 (fan) and 9.5:1 (engine), turbine inlet temperature of 1,810 °F (990 °C), maximum rated air flow for the gas generator and fan of 31.5 and 157.5 lb/s (14.3 and 71.4 kg/s), thrust-specific fuel consumption (TSFC) of 0.411 lb/(lbf⋅h) (11.6 g/(kN⋅s))
PLF1B-2
Turbofan with T55 / LTC4K 9-stage compressor gas generator core
PLF1C-1
Turbofan based on the T55-L-7C turboshaft, producing 5,220 lbf (23.2 kN) of thrust; 66 in (1.7 m) length, 41 in (100 cm) fan diameter, 6:1 bypass ratio, 1,010 lb (460 kg) weight, TSFC of 0.41 lb/(lbf⋅h) (12 g/(kN⋅s))
PLF1C-2
Turbofan based on the T55-L-11 turboshaft, producing 6,700 lbf (30 kN) of thrust; 66 in (1.7 m) length, 50 in (130 cm) fan diameter, 8.2:1 bypass ratio, 1,130 lb (510 kg) weight, TSFC of 0.36 lb/(lbf⋅h) (10 g/(kN⋅s))
T5508D
Certified September 16, 1975; dry weight 618 lb (280 kg); 2,930 shp (2,180 kW) engine powering the Bell 214B helicopter, which was produced between 1976 and 1981; 88 engines manufactured for that commercial helicopter; commercial version of the LTC4-8D
AL5512
Certified November 7, 1980; turboshaft engine with a sea-level power rating of 2,975 hp (2,218 kW) max continuous and 4,075 hp (3,039 kW) 5-minute takeoff; 30-minute power rating of 4,355 hp (3,248 kW) with one engine inoperative; dry weight 780 lb (350 kg); used on the Boeing Model 234 (civilian version of the Chinook); based on the T55-L-712; produced between 1979 and 1985, with 44 engines manufactured; also used on the Boeing Model 360, a technology demonstrator helicopter, in 1987

=== Military variants ===
YT55-L-1
Turboprop engine with a maximum and normal power rating of 1,600 and 1,325 shp (1,193 and 988 kW) and a pressure ratio of 6:1
YT55-L-1A
Turboprop version of the YT55-L-3, producing 1,850 shp (1,380 kW); length 58.85 in (149.5 cm), diameter 24.25 in (61.6 cm), dry weight 695 lb (315 kg), pressure ratio 6.5:1, air mass flow 20.5 lb/s (9.3 kg/s), BSFC 0.648 lb/(hp⋅h) (394 g/kWh)
YT55-L-3
Turboshaft engine with a maximum and normal power rating of 1,900 and 1,700 shp (1,400 and 1,300 kW) and a pressure ratio of 6:1; a geared engine that was initially selected to power the Army Chinook helicopter HC-1B (later designated as the CH-47A) in July 1958 by a joint Air Force/Army team
T55-L-5
Turboshaft engine with a maximum and normal power rating of 2,200 and 1,850 shp (1,640 and 1,380 kW) and a pressure ratio of 6:1; high-speed version of the T55-L-3 allowed for use on the Chinook instead of the geared YT55-L-3 engine due to August 1958 engine contract modification, with the reduction gearing now provided in the helicopter power transmission system instead of the engine; 570 lb (260 kg) weight engine; first delivered for the Chinook in August 1960; powered first flight of the Chinook in October 1961; selected for the Curtiss-Wright X-19 tiltrotor aircraft in August 1962; 146 engines manufactured between 1960 and 1963 for the CH-47A
T55-L-7
Turboshaft engine with a power rating of 2,650 shp (1,980 kW) and a BSFC of 0.61 lb/(hp⋅h) (370 g/kWh); completed 150-hour qualification test in September 1962 at a 2,650 shp (1,980 kW) power rating;
T55-L-7B
Military and normal power rating of 2,650 and 2,200 shp (1,980 and 1,640 kW); used on the CH-47A
T55-L-7C
Turboshaft engine with a maximum, military, and normal power rating of 2,850, 2,650, and 2,400 shp (2,130, 1,980, and 1,790 kW); used on the CH-47B; BSFC of 0.6 lb/(hp⋅h) (360 g/kWh); passed qualification testing in September 1966
YT55-L-9
Turboprop engine with a power rating of 2,445 shp (1,823 kW), weight of 795 lb (361 kg), pressure ratio of 6.4:1, and a BSFC of 0.62 lb/(hp⋅h) (380 g/kWh); used on the Rockwell YAT-28E; also powered Piper Enforcer prototype aircraft for flight tests in 1971 and 1983-1984
T55-L-11
Turboshaft engine with a maximum, military, and normal power rating of 3,750, 3,400, and 3,000 shp (2,800, 2,540, and 2,240 kW); used on the CH-47C; BSFC of 0.52 lb/(hp⋅h) (320 g/kWh); completed 50-hour preliminary flight rating test (PFRT) in May 1967
T55-L-712
3,750 shp (2,800 kW) turboshaft engine used on the CH-47D, with production starting in 1978; 849 engines manufactured by 1989
T55-L-714
4,110 shp (3,060 kW) turboshaft engine used on the MH-47E Chinook SOF
T55-GA-714A
4,777 shp (3,562 kW) turboshaft engine used on the CH-47F; low-rate initial production started in December 1997
T55-L-714A
5,000 shp (3,729 kW)
T55-GA-714C
6,000 shp (4,500 kW) turboshaft engine to be tested on an CH-47F testbed aircraft, offering a 25 percent increase in power output and 10 percent reduction in fuel consumption compared to the T55-GA-714A; initial testing of the first engine began in November 2021
T55-L-714C
6,000 shp (4,474 kW)
T55-GA-715
A 6,500 shp (4,800 kW) turboshaft engine upgrade kit proposed in 2008 for a 69,900 lb weight (31,700 kg) growth version of the Chinook
HTS7500

=== Industrial and marine variants ===
TF20
A 1,500 shp (1,100 kW) marine gas turbine first used in the early 1960's aboard the experimental landing vehicle LVHX-1.
TF25
An upgrade of TF20, replaced the original 14 T cane fuel vaporizers with 28 fuel nozzles. Initially rated for 2,000 shp (1,500 kW), but uprated to 2,750 shp (2,050 kW) by 1969.
TF35
Introduced in 1971 with a substantially redesigned turbine including partial core cooling. Changes increased length by 4 in (100 mm). Produced between 3,500 shp (2,600 kW) and 4,050 shp (3,020 kW).
TF40
Turbine blades replaced with lower aspect ratio models, cooling extended to entirety of core and outer shroud. Rated at 4,000 shp (3,000 kW) continuous and 4,600 shp (3,400 kW) intermittent by 1975. Used on JEFF (B) prototype for LCAC.
TF40B
Improved TF40 used on production LCAC, introduced better sealing and increased combustion temperatures. Rated at 4,390 shp (3,270 kW) continuous and 4,720 shp (3,520 kW) intermittent.
ETF40B
Enhanced TF40B developed in the 1990's to address increasing payload requirements for LCACs with the United States Marine Corps deployments of M1 Abrams in high heat environments. First variant to use CAD in its development, and first to utilize a FADEC. Rated at 4,700 shp (3,500 kW) continuous and 5,430 shp (4,050 kW) intermittent.
TF50A
A developmental contemporary of ETF40B designed for commercial marine applications, using the compressor of ETF40B and a combustor and gas generator derived from the LF 507 turbofan. Rated at 5,100 shp (3,800 kW) continuous and 5,600 shp (4,200 kW) intermittent.
TF60B
Development started in 2004, designed to provide 30% more power than ETF40B. Competed to power the Ship-to-Shore Connector but lost to Rolls-Royce MT7.

== Applications ==
T55/LTC4

- Bell 214
- Bell 309 KingCobra
- Boeing CH-47 Chinook
- Boeing Chinook (UK variants)
- Boeing Model 360
- RC-135E - One T55-L-5 fitted on the port wing inboard of the main engines to drive a generator providing power to the aircraft's phased array radar.
- Boeing Vertol BV-347
- Curtiss-Wright X-19
- North American YAT-28E Trojan
- Piper PA-48 Enforcer
- Sikorsky–Boeing SB-1 Defiant
- Unlimited hydroplanes

HTS7500

- Sikorsky–Boeing SB-1 Defiant X

TF series

- LVHX-1
- Coastal Patrol Interdiction Craft 1
- Paek Ku class patrol gunboat
- SES-100 surface effect ship
- VCA-30 hovercraft
- VCA-36 hovercraft
- N500 Naviplane
- Stockholm-class corvette
- JEFF (A)
- JEFF (B)
- Landing Craft Air Cushion
- Solgae-class LCAC
- Finnish hovercraft Tuuli
- Patricia Olivia II catamaran fast ferry
- Visby-class corvette
- Pershing 115 yachts
- Wally 118 yachts

== Specifications (T55-L-714A) ==
==== General characteristics ====
- Type: Turboshaft
- Length: 1,196.3 mm (47.10 in)
- Diameter: 615.9 mm (24.25 in)
- Dry weight: 377 kg (831 lb)

==== Components ====
- Compressor: 7-stage axial and 1-stage centrifugal
- Combustors: reverse flow
- Turbine: 2-stage gas producer and 2-stage free power

==== Performance ====
- Maximum power output: Engine Shaft Horsepower Class: 5,000 shp (3,729 kW)
- Overall pressure ratio: 9.32
- Turbine inlet temperature: 815 °C (1,499 °F) (power turbine inlet temperature)
- Power-to-weight ratio: (4,867 shp / 831 lbs) ~ 5.8568:1 shp/lb

== See also ==
Related development

- Lycoming T53
- Lycoming ALF502

Comparable engines

- Allison T56
- Bristol Proteus
- Napier Eland
- Rolls-Royce Tyne

Related lists

- List of aircraft engines

== Bibliography ==
- Honeywell (October 14, 2020). "Today's Tough Environment Demands Proven Systems Like The T-55 'Charlie'". Aviation Week & Space Technology. ISSN 0005-2175.
- Gunston, Bill (2006). World encyclopedia of aero engines (5th ed.). Phoenix Mill, Gloucestershire, England, UK: Sutton Publishing Limited. p. 132. ISBN 0-7509-4479-X.
- Leyes II, Richard A.; Fleming, William A. (1999). The history of North American small gas turbine aircraft engines. Washington, DC: Smithsonian Institution. pp. 176–188. ISBN 1-56347-332-1. OCLC 247550535.
- Bulban, Erwin J. (August 10, 1959). "Lycoming T55 cleared for airframe use". Aeronautical Engineering. Aviation Week. Vol. 71, no. 6. pp. 87, 91, 93–97. ISSN 0005-2175.
- Doty, L. L. (March 25, 1957). "Douglas proposes replacement for DC-3". Air Transport. Aviation Week. Vol. 66, no. 12. pp. 38–41. ISSN 0005-2175.
