= Vericor Power Systems =

Manufacturer of aeroderivative marine and industrial gas turbines

- Company type: Gas turbine engine manufacturer
- Industry: Marine and defense
- Founded: 2000; 26 years ago
- Headquarters: Alpharetta, Georgia
- Key people: Richard S. Clinton, president & CEO
- Products: Gas turbine engines
- Parent: MTU Aero Engines
- Website: http://www.vericor.com

Vericor Power Systems is a manufacturer of aeroderivative marine and industrial gas turbines based in Alpharetta, Georgia, United States. Vericor is a wholly owned subsidiary of German-based MTU Aero Engines.

== History ==
Vericor's history began in the late 1960s with Avco Lycoming. Lycoming developed its Lycoming T55 aircraft turboshaft into the TF-40 marine gas turbine for the United States Navy's Landing Craft Air Cushion (LCAC) assault transport hovercraft.

In 1994, the Lycoming Turbine Engine Division was acquired by AlliedSignal, becoming part of AlliedSignal Aerospace, and Honeywell Aerospace in 1999.

In 1999, AlliedSignal/Honeywell formed a joint venture with MTU Aero Engines called Vericor Power Systems LLC to manage its marine and industrial gas turbine products. In June 2002, MTU acquired full ownership of Vericor, which became a wholly owned subsidiary.

== Products ==
Marine Propulsion

- Vericor TF40
- Vericor ETF40B
- Vericor TF50

Power generation

- VPS3M (TF40)
- VPS4M (TF50)
- VPS1 (ASE8)
- VPS3 (ASE40)
- VPS4 (ASE50)

Oil and gas mechanical drive

- VPS1 (ASE8)
- VPS3 (ASE40)
- VPS4 (ASE50)
