= 2009 H1 Unlimited season =

2009 H1 Unlimited

Seasons
- ← 2008 2010 →

The 2009 H1 Unlimited season is the fifty fourth running of the H1 Unlimited series for unlimited hydroplane, jointly sanctioned by APBA, its governing body in North America and UIM, its international body. It is the first season to run under its new name.

The season began in July with the Madison Regatta, held in Madison, Indiana, United States, throughout the season, the series will consist of six races.

The finale of the season was in November with the Oryx Cup, held in Doha, Doha Municipality, Qatar. The 2009 Oryx Cup was the seventeenth running of the UIM World Championship for unlimited hydroplanes.

For 2010, Oh Boy! Oberto (Miss Madison) was the National High Point Team Champion, while Steve David was the National High Point Driver Champion.

== Name change ==
The series became H1 Unlimited prior to the Oryx Cup, in a bid to internationalise the series, until then, the series was known as ABRA Unlimited (American Boat Racing Association) for five seasons.

== Teams and drivers ==
- All boats are powered by Lycoming T55 L7C, originally used in Chinook helicopters, only turbine engine currently permitted in the series.

No	Team	Engine	Driver	Rounds
U-1	(Indiana) Oh Boy! Oberto (Miss Madison)	Lycoming T55 L7	(Florida) Steve David	All
U-3	(Indiana) Cooper Motorsports	Allison V-1710 Turbo	(Michigan) Jimmy King	All
U-5	(Indiana) Formulaboats.com	Lycoming T55 L7	(Washington (state)) Jeff Bernard	All
U-7	(Indiana) Graham Trucking	Lycoming T55 L7	(Washington (state)) J. Michael Kelly	All
U-9	(Washington (state)) Jones Racing	Lycoming T55 L7	(Washington (state)) David Williams	4
U-16	(Indiana) Ellstrom Elam Plus	Lycoming T55 L7C	(Indiana) Dave Villwock	All
U-17	(Indiana) Our Gang Racing	Lycoming T55	(Indiana) Kip Brown	All
U-22	(Pennsylvania) Matrix System Automotive Finishes	Lycoming T55 L7	(Pennsylvania) Mike Webster	All
U-25	(Washington (state)) Superior Racing	Lycoming T55	(Washington (state)) Ken Muscatel	All
U-37	(Washington (state)) Schumacher Racing	Lycoming T55 L7	(Quebec) Jean Theoret	All
U-48	(Washington (state)) Miss Albert Lee Appliance	Lycoming T55	(Washington (state)) Brian Perkins	All
U-100	(Washington (state)) Leland Racing	Lycoming T55 L7	(Washington (state)) Greg Hopp	All

== Season schedule and results ==
Rd.	Race	Location	Venue	Date	Winning boat	Winning driver
1	Madison Regatta (Indiana Governor's Cup)	Madison, Indiana, United States	Ohio River	July 3–5	Miss Elam Plus	Dave Villwock
2	Chrysler-Jeep Superstores Gold Cup	Detroit, Michigan, United States	Detroit River	July 10–12	Miss Elam Plus	Dave Villwock
3	Tri-City Water Follies Lamb Weston Columbia Cup	Tri-Cities, Washington, United States	Columbia River	July 24–26	Oh Boy! Oberto (Miss Madison)	Steve David
4	Seafair Cup	Seattle, Washington, United States	Lake Washington	July 31 – August 2	Miss Elam Plus	Dave Villwock
5	Thunder on the Ohio	Evansville, Indiana, United States	Ohio River	August 21–23	Miss Formulaboats.com	Jeff Bernard
6	Oryx Cup – UIM World Championship	Doha, Doha Municipality, Qatar	Doha Bay, Persian Gulf	November 19–21	U-7 Graham Trucking	J. Michael Kelly

== National High Point Champions ==
=== Team Champion ===
For the 2009 Season, Oh Boy! Oberto (Miss Madison) was the National High Point Team Champion.

Year	Team	Engine	Owner	Wins
2009	Oh Boy! Oberto (Miss Madison)	Lycoming	City of Madison	1

=== Driver Champion ===
For the 2009 Season, Steve David was the National High Point Driver Champion.

Year	Driver	Machine	Engine	Wins
2009	Steve David	Oh Boy! Oberto (Miss Madison)	Lycoming	1
