= 2010 H1 Unlimited season =

2010 H1 Unlimited

Seasons
- ← 2009 2011 →

The 2010 H1 Unlimited season was the fifty-fifth running of the H1 Unlimited series for unlimited hydroplanes, jointly sanctioned by APBA, its governing body in North America and UIM, its international body.

The series consisted of six races.

The finale of the season was the Oryx Cup, held in Doha, Doha Municipality, Qatar. The 2010 Oryx Cup was the eighteenth running of the UIM World Championship for unlimited hydroplanes.

For 2010, Oh Boy! Oberto (Miss Madison) was the National High Point Team Champion, while Steve David was the National High Point Driver Champion.

== Teams and drivers ==
- All boats are powered by Lycoming T55 L7C, originally used in Chinook helicopters, only turbine engine currently permitted in the series.

No	Team	Engine	Driver	Rounds
U-1	(Indiana) Oh Boy! Oberto- Miss Madison	Lycoming T55 L7	(Florida) Steve David	All
U-3	(Indiana) Go3 Racing	Allison V-1710 Turbo	(Michigan) Jimmy King	All
U-5	(Indiana) Formulaboats.com	Lycoming T55 L7	(Washington (state)) Jeff Bernard	All
U-7	(Indiana) Graham Trucking	Lycoming T55 L7	(Washington (state)) J. Michael Kelly	All
U-9	(Washington (state)) Jones Racing	Lycoming T55 L7	(Washington (state)) David Williams	4
U-13	(Michigan) Spirit of Detroit	Lycoming T55 L7	(Michigan) Cal Phipps	4
U-17	(Washington (state)) Our Gang Racing	Lycoming T55	(Washington (state)) Kip Brown	All
U-21	(Washington (state)) Albert Lee	Lycoming T55	(Washington (state)) Brian Perkins	All
U-22	(Pennsylvania) Matrix System Automotive Finishes	Lycoming T55 L7	(Pennsylvania) Mike Webster	All
U-25	(Washington (state)) Superior Racing	Lycoming T55	(Washington (state)) Ken Muscatel	All
U-37	(Washington (state)) Schumacher Racing	Lycoming T55 L7	(Washington (state)) JW Myers	All
U-96	Qatar Spirit of Qatar	Lycoming T55 L7C	(Washington (state)) Dave Villwock	All
U-100	(Washington (state)) Leland Racing	Lycoming T55 L7	(Washington (state)) Greg Hopp	All

== Season schedule and results ==
Rd.	Race	Location	Venue	Date	Winning boat	Winning driver
1	Lucas Oil Indiana Governor's Cup (Madison Regatta)	Madison, Indiana, United States	Ohio River	July 2–4	Oh Boy! Oberto- Miss Madison	Steve David
2	APBA Gold Cup	Detroit, Michigan, United States	Detroit River	July 9–11	Spirit of Qatar	Dave Villwock
3	Lamb Weston Columbia Cup	Tri-Cities, Washington, United States	Columbia River	July 23–25	Oh Boy! Oberto- Miss Madison	Steve David
4	Albert Lee Cup at Seafair	Seattle, Washington, United States	Lake Washington	August 6–8	Oh Boy! Oberto- Miss Madison	Steve David
5	Air Guard Championship	San Diego, California, United States	Mission Bay	September 17–19	Spirit of Qatar	Dave Villwock
6	Oryx Cup – UIM World Championship	Doha, Doha Municipality, Qatar	Doha Bay, Persian Gulf	November 18–20	Spirit of Qatar	Dave Villwock

== National High Point Champions ==
=== Team Champion ===
For the 2010 Season, Oh Boy! Oberto (Miss Madison) was the National High Point Team Champion.

Year	Team	Engine	Owner	Wins
2010	Oh Boy! Oberto (Miss Madison)	Lycoming	City of Madison	3

=== Driver Champion ===
For the 2010 Season, Steve David was the National High Point Driver Champion.

Year	Driver	Machine	Engine	Wins
2010	Steve David	Oh Boy! Oberto (Miss Madison)	Lycoming	3
