= 2011 H1 Unlimited season =

The 2011 H1 Unlimited season was the fifty sixth running of the H1 Unlimited series for unlimited hydroplane, jointly sanctioned by APBA, its governing body in North America and UIM, its international body.

The season began in July with the Lucas Oil Indiana Governor's Cup (Madison Regatta), held in Madison, Indiana, United States.

The finale of the season was held in November with the Oryx Cup, held in Doha, Doha Municipality, Qatar. The 2011 Oryx Cup was the 19th running of the UIM World Championship for unlimited hydroplanes.

== Teams and drivers ==
- All boats were powered by Lycoming T55 L7C, originally used in Chinook helicopters, only turbine engine currently permitted in the series.

No	Team	Engine	Driver	Rounds
U-1	(Indiana) Oh Boy! Oberto- Miss Madison	Lycoming T55 L7	(Florida) Steve David / (Washington (state)) Jon Zimmerman	All
U-5	(Indiana) Graham Trucking	Lycoming T55 L7	(Washington (state)) Jeff Bernard	All
U-7	(Indiana) Valken Sports	Lycoming T55 L7	(Virginia) Scott Liddycoat	All
U-9	(Washington (state)) Jones Racing	Lycoming T55 L7	(Washington (state)) Jon Zimmerman	TC & SEA
U-11	(Washington (state)) Peters & May Racing	Lycoming T55 L7	(Washington (state)) JW Myers	All
U-17	(Washington (state)) Miss Red Dot	Lycoming T55 L7	(Washington (state)) Kip Brown / (Michigan) Cal Phipps	All
U-21	(Washington (state)) Go Fast, Turn Left Racing	Lycoming T55 L7	(Washington (state)) Brian Perkins	All
U-22	(Pennsylvania) Matrix System Automotive Finishes	Lycoming T55 L7	(Pennsylvania) Mike Webster	All
U-25	(Washington (state)) Superior Racing	Lycoming T55 L7C	(Washington (state)) Ken Muscatel	All
U-57	(Indiana) Formulaboats.com	Lycoming T55	Mark Evans / Bianca Bononcini	All
U-88	(Washington (state)) Degree Men	Lycoming T55 L7	(Washington (state)) J. Michael Kelly	All
U-96	(Washington (state)) Spirit of Qatar	Lycoming T55 L7	(Washington (state)) Dave Villwock	All
U-100	(Washington (state)) Leland Unlimited	Lycoming T55 L7	(Washington (state)) Greg Hopp	All

== Season schedule and results ==
Rd.	Race	Location	Venue	Date	Winning boat	Winning driver
1	Lucas Oil Indiana Governor's Cup (Madison Regatta)	Madison, Indiana, United States	Ohio River	July 1–3	U-1 Oh Boy! Oberto	Steve David
2	APBA Gold Cup	Detroit, Michigan, United States	Detroit River	July 8–10	U-96 Spirit of Qatar	Dave Villwock
3	Lamb Weston Columbia Cup	Tri-Cities, Washington, United States	Columbia River	July 29–31	U-96 Spirit of Qatar	Dave Villwock
4	Albert Lee Cup at Seafair	Seattle, Washington, United States	Lake Washington	August 5–7	U-1 Oh Boy! Oberto	Steve David
5	Air Guard Championship	San Diego, California, United States	Mission Bay	September 16–18	U-96 Spirit of Qatar	Dave Villwock
6	Oryx Cup – UIM World Championship	Doha, Doha Municipality, Qatar	Doha Bay, Persian Gulf	November 17–19	U-7 Valken.com	Scott Liddycoat

== National High Points Standings ==
Boat	Points
U-96 Spirit of Qatar	5,825
U-5 Graham Trucking	4,625
U-17 Miss Red Dot	4,592
U-7 Valken.com	4,325
U-1 Oh Boy! Oberto	4,262
U-88 Degree Men	3,042
U-21 Go Fast, Turn Left! Racing	2,746
U-100 Leland Racing	2,409
U-57 Formulaboats.com	2,135
U-11 Peters & May	2,063
U-22 Great Scott!	1,308
U-9 Jones Racing	1,098
U-25 Superior Racing	1,016
U-99 Leland Racing	0

== Driver Points Standings ==
Driver	Points
Dave Villwock	5,825
Jeff Bernard	4,625
Scott Liddycoat	4,325
Steve David	3,536
Kip Brown	3,080
J. Michael Kelly	3,042
Brian Perkins	2,746
Greg Hopp	2,409
Mark Evans	2,135
JW Myers	2,063
Jon Zimmerman	1,824
Cal Phipps	1,512
Mike Webster	1,308
Ken Muscatel	1,016
Ryan Mallow	0
