= Madison Regatta =

Annual hydroplane boat race in Indiana, U.S.

Event information
- Type: H1 Unlimited hydroplane boat race
- Race area: Ohio River, Madison, Indiana
- Dates: July 1–3
- Sponsor: MainSource Bank (Title sponsor); Belterra Casino Resort (Presenting sponsor)
- Distance: 2.5 mi (4 km)
- Media coverage: ESPN3; WORX-FM
- First race: 1950
- Website: www.madisonregatta.com

The Indiana Governor's Cup (more commonly known as the Madison Regatta) is an H1 Unlimited hydroplane boat race held annually on Independence Day weekend on the Ohio River in Madison, Indiana. Madison has hosted the Madison Regatta annually since 1951, although the race was also contested in the 1930s. The race inspired a Hollywood motion picture released in 2005, titled Madison which starred actor Jim Caviezel. The Regatta was part of the APBA Gold Cup in 1979, 1980. 2019, & will be contested in 2021.

== History ==
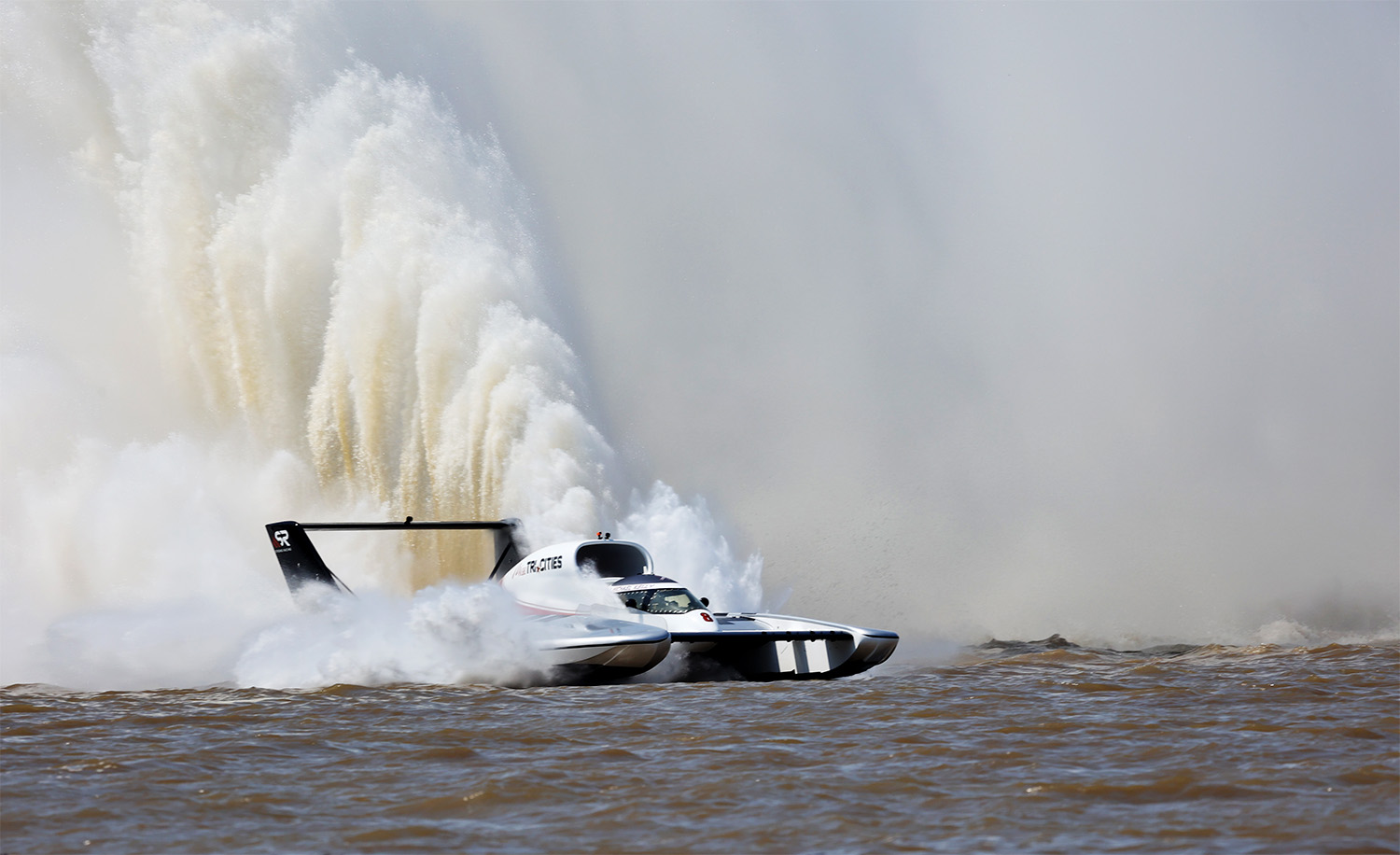
U-8 Miss Tri-Cities, first turn on the Ohio River, Madison Regatta, 2022

Informal racing took place in Madison, Indiana, as early as 1911, but the first major race did not occur until 1929. That was when the now-defunct Mississippi Valley Power Boat Association conducted a race for the 725 Cubic Inch Class, which evolved into the Unlimited Class after World War II. The MVPBA conducted the Webb Trophy at Madison in 1930. The Webb Trophy was the MVPBA equivalent of the APBA Gold Cup—their top award.

The 725s raced at Madison throughout the 1930s until the disastrous Ohio River flood of 1937 and World War II brought down the curtain for a while.

The current series of regattas in Madison began in 1949. This was a "wildcat" race, administered by the Ohio Valley Motor Boat Racing Association of Cincinnati. The largest class present was the 225 Cubic Inch Class.

The first Unlimited race took place in 1950. The Unlimited races at Madison from 1950 to 1953 were one-heat multi-class free-for-all affairs. They didn't count for National High Points.

The first High Points Unlimited race at Madison occurred in 1954. This came about largely through the efforts of Madison Courier columnist Phil Cole. (A High Points Unlimited race must be scheduled for a minimum of two heats with at least four boats making a legal start.)

Madison had an uninterrupted string of High Points Unlimited races every year from 1954 through 2012. The 2013 races were canceled because of flooding on the Ohio that covered the pit area, although the land-based events associated with the regatta went on as scheduled.

Madison hosted the APBA Gold Cup in 1971, 1979–1980, 2019, and 2021. Madison hosted the U.I.M. World's Championship in 1972 and 2004.

The Madison committee is the longest continuously active Unlimited committee in the country. Madison Regatta, Inc. (formerly the Madison Boat Club) has hosted the Unlimiteds every year since 1950 (except in 2013 and 2015 because of river conditions). Seattle did not start until 1951. Detroit has been on the circuit since 1946, but with four different committees.

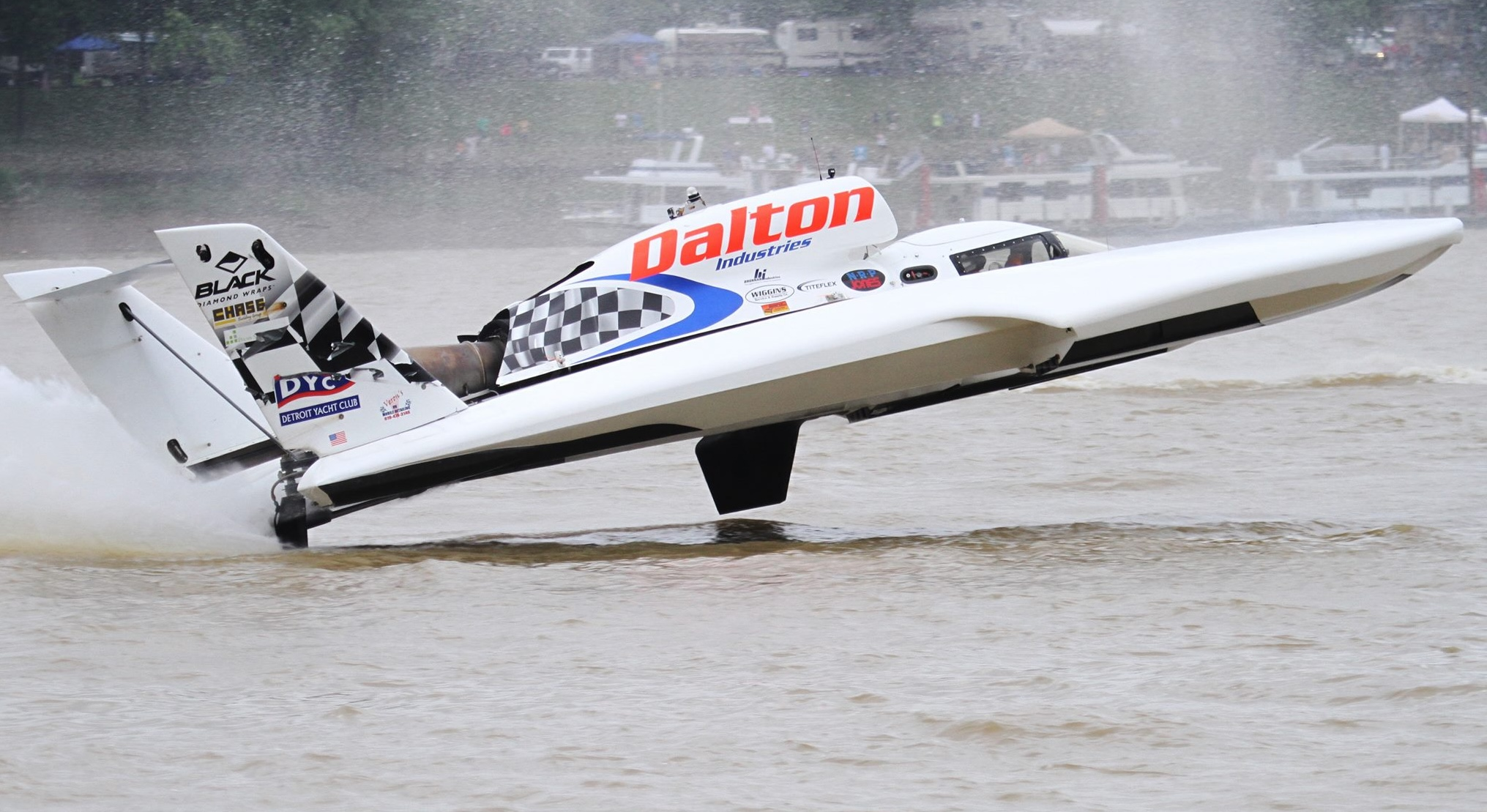
U-27 Miss Dalton Industries gets airborne, 2016 Madison Regatta

== List of Madison Regatta winners ==
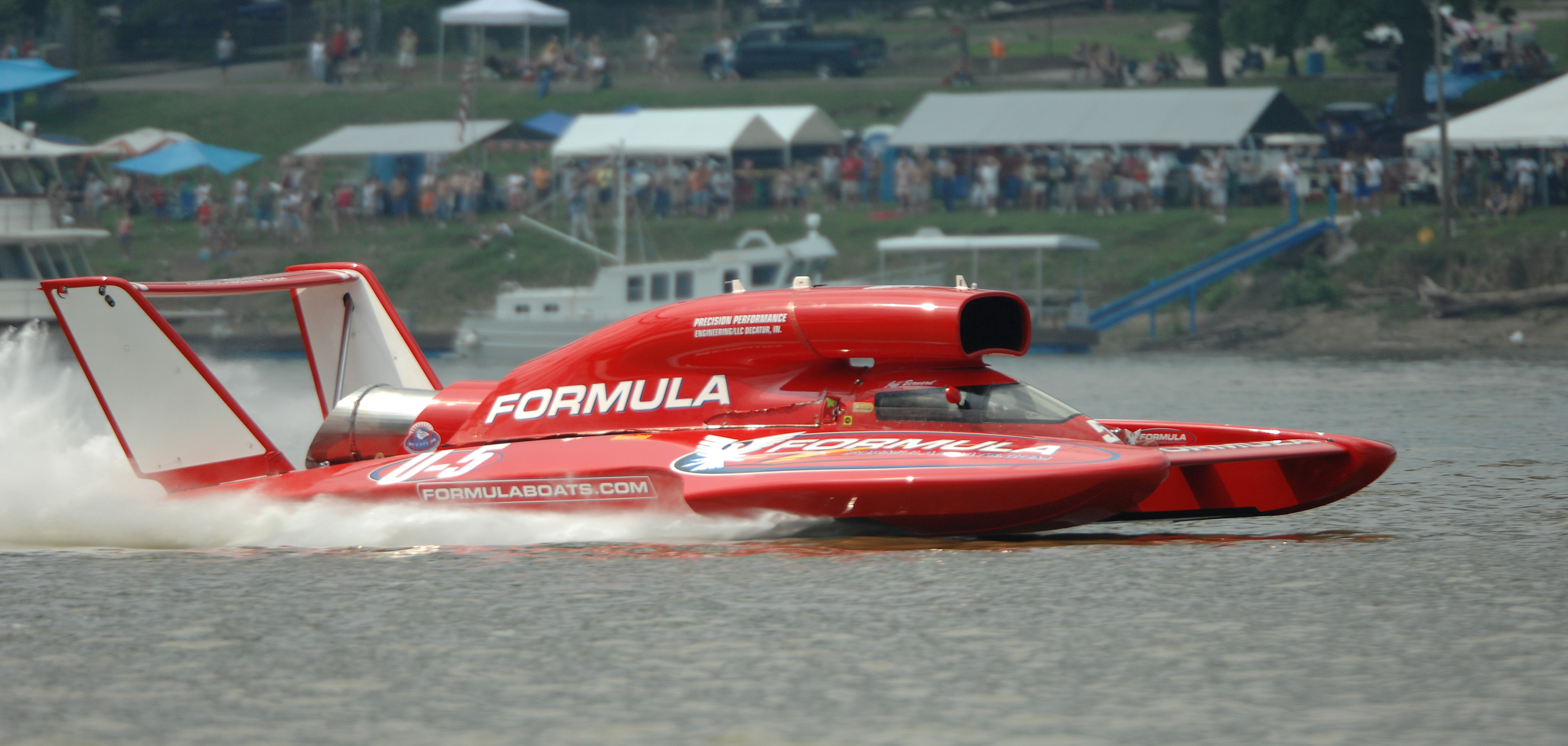
2008 winner FormulaBoats.com

Year	Event	Driver	Boat
1951	Indiana Governor's Cup	Marion Cooper	Hornet
1952	Indiana Governor's Cup	Burnett Bartley	Wildcatter
1953	Indiana Governor's Cup	Burnett Bartley	Wildcatter
1954	Indiana Governor's Cup	Bill Cantrell	Gale IV
1955	Indiana Governor's Cup	Danny Foster	Tempo VII
1956	Indiana Governor's Cup	Fred Alter	Miss US I
1957	Indiana Governor's Cup	Jack Regas	Hawaii Kai III
1958	Indiana Governor's Cup	Don Wilson	Miss US I
1959	Indiana Governor's Cup	Ron Musson	Hawaii Kai III
1960	Indiana Governor's Cup	Bill Muncey	Miss Thriftway
1961	Indiana Governor's Cup	Bill Muncey	Miss Century 21
1962	Indiana Governor's Cup	Bill Muncey	Miss Century 21
1963	Indiana Governor's Cup	Bill Brow	Miss Exide
1964	Indiana Governor's Cup	Chuck Thompson	Tahoe Miss
1965	Indiana Governor's Cup	Chuck Thompson	Tahoe Miss
1966	Indiana Governor's Cup	Mira Slovak	Tahoe Miss
1967	Indiana Governor's Cup	Billy Schumacher	Miss Bardahl
1968	Indiana Governor's Cup	Billy Schumacher	Miss Bardahl
1969	Indiana Governor's Cup	Dean Chenoweth	Myr's Special
1970	Indiana Governor's Cup	Dean Chenoweth	Miss Budweiser
1971	APBA Gold Cup	Jim McCormick	Miss Madison
1972	U.I.M. World's Championship	Bill Muncey	Atlas Van Lines
1973	Indiana Governor's Cup	Mickey Remund	Pay 'n Pak
1974	Indiana Governor's Cup	George Henley	Pay 'n Pak
1975	Indiana Governor's Cup	George Henley	Pay n'Pak
1976	Indiana Governor's Cup	Bill Muncey	Atlas Van Lines
1977	Indiana Governor's Cup	Eric Godfrey	Miss Budweiser
1978	Indiana Governor's Cup	Bill Muncey	Atlas Van Lines
1979	APBA Gold Cup	Bill Muncey	Atlas Van Lines
1980	APBA Gold Cup	Dean Chenoweth	Miss Budweiser
1981	Indiana Governor's Cup	Dean Chenoweth	Miss Budweiser
1982	Indiana Governor's Cup	Tom D'Eath	The Squire Shop
1983	Indiana Governor's Cup	Jim Kropfeld	Miss Budweiser
1984	Indiana Governor's Cup	Chip Hanauer	Atlas Van Lines
1985	Indiana Governor's Cup	Steve Reynolds	Miss 7-Eleven
1986	Indiana Governor's Cup	Chip Hanauer	Miller American
1987	Indiana Governor's Cup	Jim Kropfield	Miss Budweiser
1988	Indiana Governor's Cup	Scott Pierce	Mr. Pringle's
1989	Indiana Governor's Cup	Jim Kropfield	Miss Budweiser
1990	Indiana Governor's Cup	Chip Hanauer	Miss Circus Circus
1991	Indiana Governor's Cup	Mark Evans	American Spirit
1992	Budweiser Indiana Governor's Cup	Chip Hanauer	Miss Budweiser
1993	Indiana Governor's Cup	Chip Hanauer	Miss Budweiser
1994	Budweiser Indiana Governor's Cup	Chip Hanauer	Miss Budweiser
1995	Budweiser Indiana Governor's Cup	Mark Tate	Smokin' Joe's
1996	Budweiser Indiana Governor's Cup	Mark Tate	Smokin' Joe's
1997	Budweiser Indiana Governor's Cup	Dave Villwock	Miss Budweiser
1998	Budweiser Indiana Governor's Cup	Dave Villwock	Miss Budweiser
1999	Jasper Indiana Governor's Cup	Chip Hanauer	Miss Pico
2000	Indiana Governor's Cup	Dave Villwock	Miss Budweiser
2001	Beltano Casino Madison Regatta	Steve David	Oh Boy! Oberto
2002	Budweiser Madison Regatta	Nate Brown	Miss Elam Plus
2003	Budweiser Madison Regatta	Dave Villwock	Miss Budweiser
2004	U.I.M. World's Championship	Dave Villwock	Miss Budweiser
2005	Budweiser Madison Regatta	J.W. Myers	Miss Elam Plus
2006	Madison Regatta	Dave Villwock	Miss Elam Plus
2007	Indiana Governor's Cup	Dave Villwock	Miss Elam Plus
2008	Indiana Governor's Cup	Jeff Bernard	Formulaboats.com
2009	Indiana Governor's Cup	Dave Villwock	Miss Elam Plus
2010	Indiana Governor's Cup	Steve David	Oh Boy! Oberto/Miss Madison
2011	Indiana Governor's Cup	Steve David	Oh Boy! Oberto/Miss Madison
2012	Lucas Oil Indiana Governor's Cup	Dave Villwock	Spirit of Qatar
2013	No race; canceled due to high water		
2014	Indiana Governor's Cup	J. Michael Kelly	U-5 Graham Trucking
2015	Indiana Governor's Cup	J. Michael Kelly ^{1}	U-5 Graham Trucking
2016	MainSource Bank Madison Regatta	Jimmy Shane	Homestreet Bank
2017	Indiana Governor's Cup	Andrew Tate	Delta Realtrac
2018	Madison Regatta	Jimmy Shane	Miss Homestreet
2019	APBA Gold Cup	Jimmy Shane	Miss Homestreet
2020	APBA Gold Cup	No season	
2021	APBA Gold Cup	Jimmy Shane	Miss Homestreet
2022	Madison Regatta	Jimmy Shane	Miss Homestreet
2023	Madison Regatta	J. Michael Kelly	Miss Beacon Electric
2024	Madison Regatta	Andrew Tate	Miss Goodman Real Estate

^{1} The 2015 race was declared a non-championship round because of high water and debris on the Ohio River where six of the 11 boats withdrew. The five boats participated even without points.

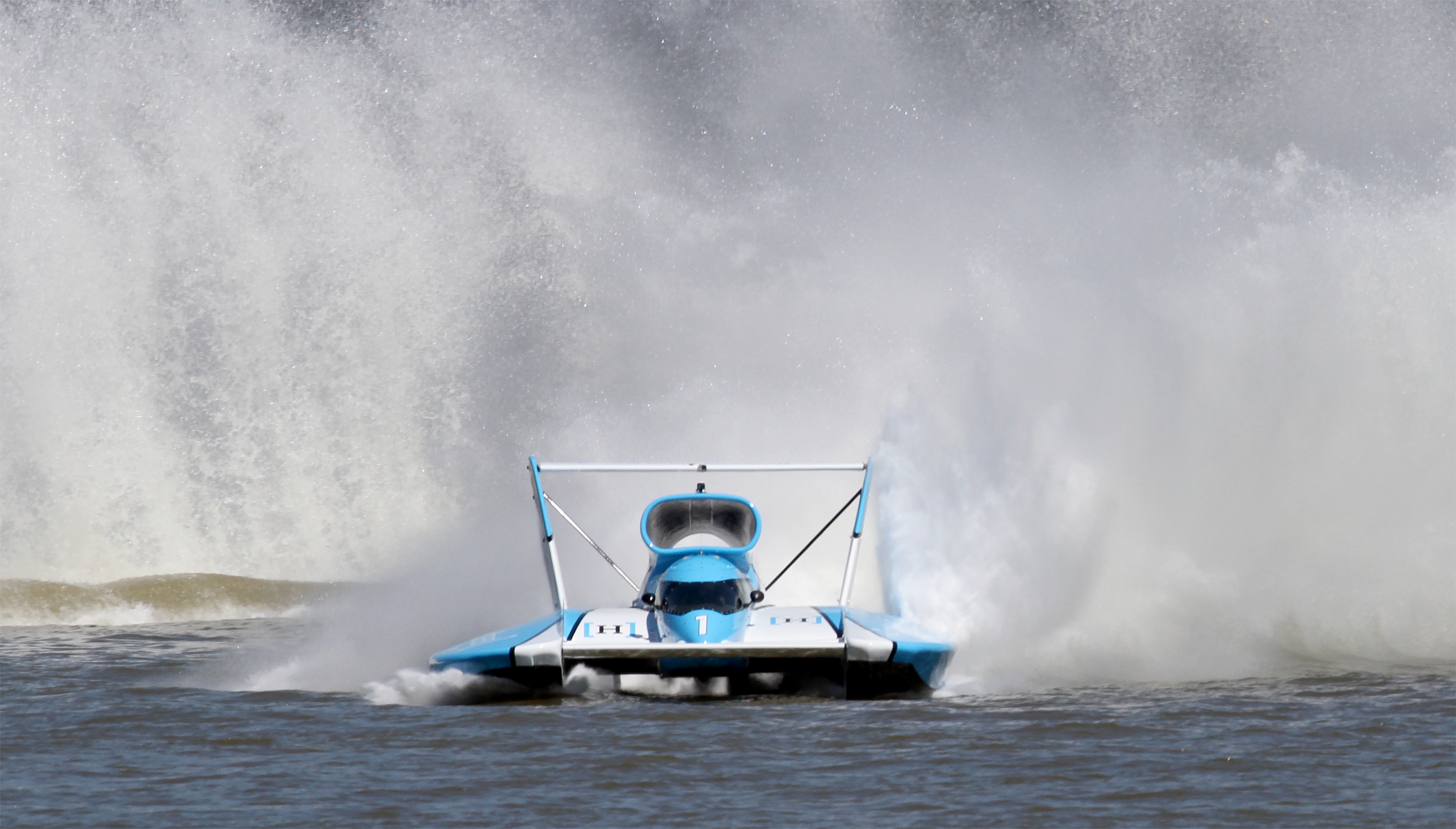
Miss Madison on the Ohio River at the 2017 Madison Regatta
