= Madison (film) =

- Theatrical release poster
- Directed by: William Bindley
- Written by: William Bindley; Scott Bindley
- Produced by: William Bindley; Carl Amari
- Starring: Jim Caviezel; Jake Lloyd; Mary McCormack; Bruce Dern; Brent Briscoe
- Cinematography: James Glennon
- Edited by: William Hoy
- Music by: Kevin Kiner
- Distributed by: Metro-Goldwyn-Mayer
- Release dates: January 23, 2001 (Sundance); April 22, 2005 (United States)
- Running time: 99 minutes
- Country: United States
- Language: English
- Box office: $500,000

Madison is a 2001 American sports drama film directed by William Bindley, about APBA hydroplane racing in the 1970s that is based on a true story. It stars Jim Caviezel as a driver who comes out of retirement to lead the Madison, Indiana, community-owned racing team. This movie also marks the film debut of Brie Larson.

== Plot ==
“After an accident ends his career as a hydroplane pilot, Jim McCormick (Jim Caviezel) settles into life as an air-conditioner mechanic, husband and father in a Midwestern town. The population of Madison, Ind., is relatively small, but it has been a fixture of national powerboat racing for years -- although that's in danger of ending. With life in the town being bleak enough as is, Jim, with the blessing of his wife (Mary McCormack) and son (Jake Lloyd), enters the 1971 Gold Cup hydroplane race.”

== Cast ==
- Jim Caviezel as Jim McCormick
- Jake Lloyd as Mike McCormick
- Mary McCormack as Bonnie McCormick
- Bruce Dern as Harry Volpi
- Paul Dooley as Mayor Don Vaughn
- Brent Briscoe as Tony Steinhardt
- Mark Fauser as Travis
- Reed Diamond as Skip Naughton
- Frank Knapp Jr. as Bobby Humphrey
- Chelcie Ross as Roger Epperson
- Jim Hendrick as himself
- John Mellencamp as narrator (adult Mike McCormick)
- Brie Larson as Racing Girl 2
- Carl Amari as Jake the Banker
- Troy Waters as himself

== Production ==
=== Background ===
Madison, Indiana, on the Ohio River, has sponsored powerboat racing since 1911 and began holding an annual race called the Madison Regatta in 1929. Beginning in 1954, the race became affiliated with the American Power Boat Association, held annually in July. Though Madison has a population of only 12,000, the Regatta maintains its place in the Unlimited hydroplane American Boat Racing Association series, whose other races are in Seattle, Kennewick, Detroit, San Diego, and Doha.

The Regatta regularly draws about 70,000-100,000 people and is a tremendous source of pride for residents of the town. Also significant is that Madison has the world's only community owned unlimited hydroplane, Miss Madison. The boat was traditionally near the bottom of the circuit. In 40+ years of racing, U-6 (its number regardless of its name) had won just six races before 2005.

One of those was an upset in the 1971 Regatta, which is the basis for the movie. Making that victory even sweeter was that it was also for the APBA Gold Cup.

Caviezel's character, Jim McCormick, was a real-life veteran racer and boat owner who drove Miss Madison in 1966 and 1969–71, then raced his own boat until seriously injured some years later. Many of his actual seven-man pit crew, including Harry Volpi, Bobby Humphrey, and Tony Steinhardt, were also portrayed in the film, while Steinhardt himself appeared as a fan in a cameo.

With Jake Lloyd's retirement from acting in 2001 (he completed filming his scenes the previous year), Madison stands as his final film to date.

=== Delayed release ===
Filmed in 2000 and completing post-production in 2001, Madison was selected to be the opening film at the 2001 Sundance Film Festival. Playing to a standing ovation at Sundance, it was picked up for distribution by a company that went out of business, stalling its release. On April 22, 2005, MGM released the film worldwide, making it the last film ever released by the studio as an independent company.

== Reception ==
The review aggregation website Rotten Tomatoes reported a 30% approval rating with an average rating of 4.50/10 based on 33 reviews. The website's consensus calls the film, "A predictable and heavy-handed sports drama." Metacritic assigned a score of 43 out of 100, based on 15 critics, indicating "mixed or average reviews".
