= Dean Chenoweth =

American hydroplane racing pilot

- Dean Chenoweth
- Born: Dean Alan Chenoweth; August 27, 1937; Xenia, Ohio, U.S.
- Died: July 31, 1982 (aged 44); Kennewick, Washington
- Cause of death: Hydroplane racing accident
- Resting place: Tallahassee, Florida
- Monuments: Fountain in Lake Leon
- Known for: Hydroplane racing

Dean Alan Chenoweth (August 27, 1937 – July 31, 1982) was an American hydroplane racing pilot. Known for piloting the famous Miss Budweiser boat and the winner of four American Power Boat Association Gold Cups, he was killed at age 44 in a racing accident on the Columbia River.

== Career ==
Born in Xenia, Ohio, and a long-time resident of Tallahassee, Florida, Chenoweth began his career in motorboat racing at the age of 12. At 15, he won three national championships, in Class A and Class B hydroplanes and Class A stock boats.

Chenoweth moved to unlimited class hydroplane racing in 1968. Between 1968 and 1982, he won four APBA Gold Cups, in 1970, 1973, 1980, and 1981, and won the National High Point Championships four times. Chenoweth also set a record of twenty heat race wins in the first five events of the 1980 season.

Best known as the driver of Bernie Little's famed Miss Budweiser, and owner of a Budweiser distributorship in Tallahassee, where he moved in 1973, Chenoweth survived a number of spectacular accidents, including a massive blowover on Lake Washington at Seattle during a speed record attempt in October 1979.

Chenoweth was inducted into the Motorsports Hall of Fame of America in 1991.

== Death ==
While piloting Miss Budweiser in 1982, Chenoweth was killed on the Columbia River in Washington on July 31. During Saturday morning qualifying for the next day's Columbia Cup at the Tri-Cities, the boat was traveling at about 175 mph (280 km/h) when it blew over and impacted inverted. He suffered massive head, neck, and chest injuries; when pulled from the water, he was unconscious and did not have a pulse. Chenoweth was taken to Kennewick General Hospital, and was pronounced dead 45 minutes after the accident.

Less than ten months earlier, hydroplane racing legend Bill Muncey was killed during the last race of the 1981 season at Acapulco, Mexico.

== Legacy ==
Chenoweth's death led Little to develop a closed cockpit for the next Miss Budweiser boat, and the enclosure became standard for unlimited racers. He is memorialized by a fountain in Lake Leon in Tallahassee's Tom Brown Park; he had been named the city's Man of the Year for 1981.
