= Bill Schumacher =

American hydroplane driver

Bill Schumacher was an American hydroplane driver. He is best known for driving the Unlimited Hydroplane Miss Bardahl to two American Power Boat Association Gold Cup championships in 1967 and 1968.
