= Ron Musson =

Hydroplane driver

Ronald J. Musson (died June 19, 1966) was a hydroplane driver from Akron, Ohio. He is best known for driving the Unlimited Hydroplane Miss Bardahl to three American Power Boat Association Gold Cup championships in 1963, 1964 and 1965. Musson died on Sunday, June 19, 1966 on what became known as "Black Sunday", when three unlimited drivers were killed during the President's Cup race on the Potomac River in Washington, DC. Musson was driving Miss Bardahl at the time. Also killed were Rex Manchester, driving the Notre Dame hydroplane, and Don Wilson, driving Miss Budweiser. Musson was inducted into the Motorsports Hall of Fame of America in 1993.
