= Terry Troxell =

American hydroplane driver

Terry Troxell (c.1948 – June 2009) was a hydroplane driver, known best for racing Unlimited Hydroplanes.

Troxell won the 2005 American Power Boat Association Gold Cup driving the Miss Al Deeby Dodge hydroplane.
