= Miss Bardahl =

Miss Bardahl was an Unlimited Hydroplane that raced from 1957 to 1969.

Between 1963 and 1968, the team won five American Power Boat Association Gold Cups. Driver Ron Musson won three from 1963 through 1965, and driver Bill Schumacher won in 1967 and 1968. Miss Bardahl also was a six time National Champion.

The boat was owned by Ole Bardahl, founder of Bardahl Oil Company.
