= Jack Beebe =

American boat builder and designer

Jack Beebe was an American boat builder and designer from Marine City, Michigan, who drove the Miss Detroit hydroplane to the 1915 American Power Boat Association Gold Cup victory after replacing the original driver of the boat who became seasick. Beebe's boats were known for their speed.
