= Gale V =

Gale V was an unlimited hydroplane that raced in the 1950s. The Gale V team won the National High Point Championship in 1954 and 1955 and won the American Power Boat Association Gold Cup in 1955 with Lee Schoenith driving. The boat was retired after the 1955 season.
