= Miss Madison =

Unlimited Hydroplane boat

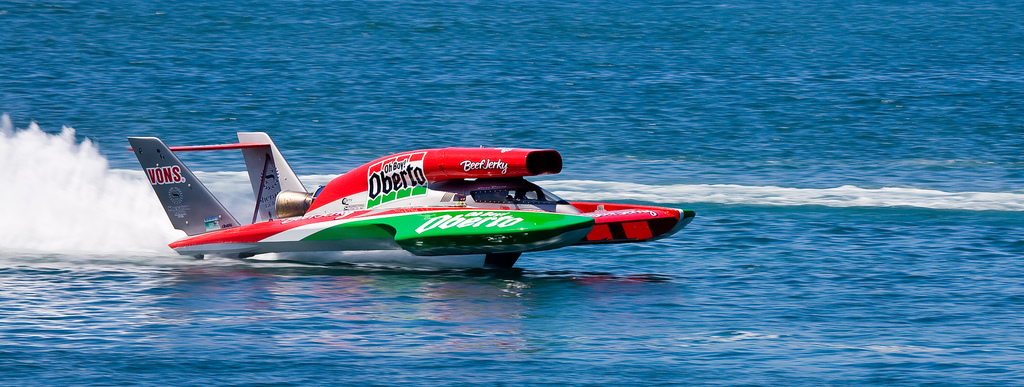
Miss Madison, in the colors of Oberto Sausage Company in 2007. The hull was used until the end of 2023. The 2018 hull was completed and the livery is different.

Miss Madison is an H1 Unlimited hydroplane team. It is the only community-owned Unlimited hydroplane in the world. It is based out of Madison, Indiana, a small town of 12,000 residents on the Ohio River which annually hosts the Madison Regatta. The story of the boat and city are the subject of the 2001 film Madison.

Traditionally running under the U-6 banner, for 2024 they will field a new boat for the 2024 season, U-91 Miss Goodman Real Estate. The number refers to the 1991 founding of the sponsor..

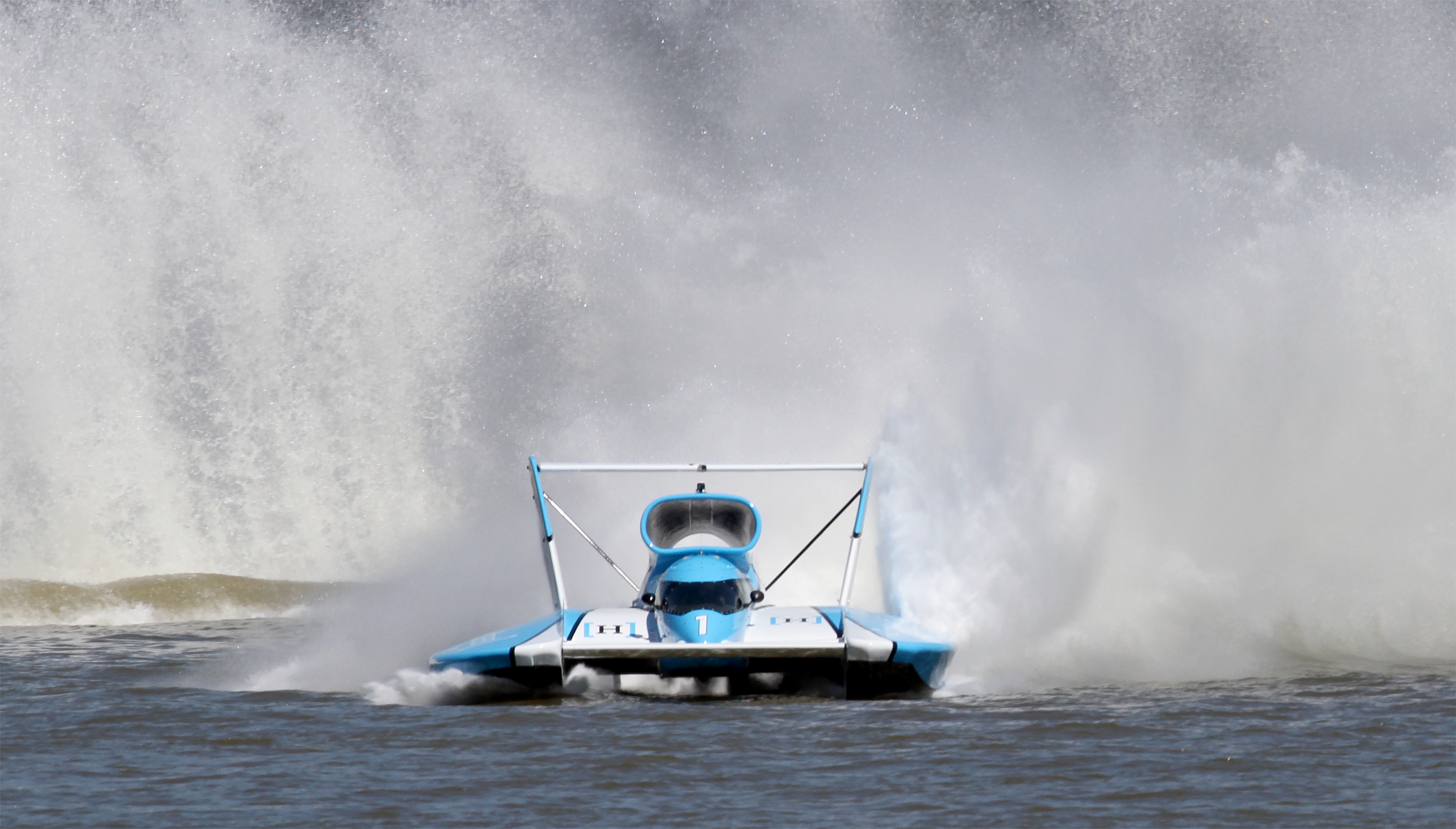
Miss Madison on the Ohio River at the 2017 Madison Regatta

== History ==
The team was started in 1960 when industrialist Samuel F. Dupont donated one of his hydroplanes to the town in 1961 to be run in the American Power Boat Association races. The town's boat is registered as "U-6" (for APBA Unlimited class, #6) in high-points unlimited hydroplane racing since 1961, which makes them the longest-running team in the sport, although the team will change numbers if required by H1 Unlimited regulations that state the defending national champion use the U-1 designation. Through 2008 the U-6 team has used only 7 different hulls, although number 6 was used for only one race in 1988 when the new 5th Miss Madison hull crashed at San Diego in 1988. The Miss Madison team leased the U-3 Risley's hull from owners Ed Cooper, Sr., and Ed Cooper, Jr., for the final race of the year in Las Vegas. The U-3 was officially the U-6 Miss Madison at this one event. The 2nd-to-last hull was built in 1988 by Ron Jones Marine in Seattle, Washington. The hull was first used as a piston-engined boat powered by a V-12 Allison aircraft engine. It was later redesigned for a Lycoming turbine engine, the same type of engine used in the Chinook helicopters. The championship winning U-1 Miss HomeStreet sponsored racing hull was built in 2007 for the H1 Unlimited hydroplane series. A new U-6 debuted in 2018. It was originally built in 2003 but was never completed following Bernie Little's death. That hull was acquired by HomeStreet in 2017 and debuted at the end of the 2018 season. During the 2019 season, the team ran two boats, with the 2007 hull as the U-1918 (for sponsor Oberto Specialty Meats' founding year) and the 2018 hull as the U-6. The second hull was renamed after a sponsorship and management deal, it is now known as the U-91 Miss Goodman Real Estate. The two hulls were raced until 2023.

For 2024, one hull will be raced (the 2018 boat) and will carry U-91 (1991 founding year) of Goodman Real Estate.

== Hulls ==
Miss Madison Racing Hulls
(1961–present)

HULL #	Years	Wins	Powerplant	Formerly	Notes
1	1961-1963	0	Allison V-12	U-79 Nitrogen	Destroyed in 1963 Gold Cup trials
2	1963-1971	3	Allison V-12	U-79-2 Nitrogen Too	1971 Gold Cup champion
3	1972-1977	0	Allison V-12	-	-
4	1978-1988	1	Allison V-12	Pay 'n Pak and Atlas Van Lines	-
5	1988-1990	1	Allison V-12	-	-
-	1991-2006	2	Lycoming Turbine	-	-
6	1988	0	Allison V-12	Risley's	Is the Cooper family U-3 hydroplane, borrowed for one race.
7	2007–2023	12	Lycoming Turbine	-	After the 2018 hull began racing, Miss Madison continued to field the old hull in West Coast races during the 2019 season as the U-1918 Oberto Specialty Meats (referencing the date of the brand's founding). It was the first time there were two Miss Madison boats in a single regatta. Was the U-91 Goodman Real Estate (again referencing its founding, 1991) since 2021.
8	2018-2024	1	Lycoming Turbine	Miss Budweiser (T-7) (never completed)	An unfinished boat formerly owned by Joe Little following his father's death in 2003, the boat was built in Tukwila, WA at the Little shop. HomeStreet Bank acquired the boat when they acquired Hydroplanes, Inc., the Little family shop, and finished the hull in 2018. During the 2019 season, this boat was the U-6 when Miss Madison fielded two boats. In years after the team is the national champion, it carried U-1. When the team downsized in 2024, the boat became the primary boat, now carrying U-91 for its sponsor.
8	2025-present	1	Lycoming Turbine	Miss Budweiser (T-3)	A boat owned by Dave Bartush of Detroit MI, was leased by Miss Madison Racing for the 2025 season after Charlie Grooms wrongfully sold the teams former hulls (2007 "Sharky" and T-7) and equipment to Bruce Ratchford. Under the leadership of Crew Chief Trey Holt, the team plans to compete in Guntersville Alabama, and the hometown race the Madison Regatta.

== Wins ==
The Miss Madison had only a handful of wins in its history prior to joining the H-1 Unlimited series. The team has won ten (2008-10, 2012, 2014-17, 2019, 2021) National High Point Championships for the racing season. The single biggest individual victory occurred in 1971, when the Gold Cup (the World Series of hydroplane racing) was held in Madison for the first time. U-6 went on to win the Atomic Cup in Tri-Cities, Washington, that same year, and finished second nationally in overall points for the 1971 season.

Other major victories occurred when she won in 2001 and 2010 in Madison for the home town fans. Miss Madison has won in Guntersville, Alabama in 1965, Lake Ozark, Missouri in 1983, San Diego, California in 1993, Thunder on the Ohio in Evansville, Indiana in 2005, and the Columbia Cup in Tri-Cities, Washington in 2008 and 2009. Two wins in 2007 coming in Seattle at the Seafair Cup, and San Diego, California.

=== National High Point Championships ===
Year	Driver
2008	Steve David
2009	Steve David
2010	Steve David
2012	Steve David
2014	Jimmy Shane
2015	Jimmy Shane
2016	Jimmy Shane
2017	Jimmy Shane
2019	Jimmy Shane
2021	Team only Jeff Bernard (1) and Jimmy Shane (2-4)
2022	Jimmy Shane

=== Gold Cup Championships ===
Year	Driver
1971	Jim McCormick
2014	Jimmy Shane
2015	Jimmy Shane
2017	Jimmy Shane
2019	Jimmy Shane
2021	Jimmy Shane

== Sponsorship ==
As with any racing team, sponsors have been important to keep teams running. Miss Madison has had many title sponsors through the years. Many of them have been large companies. The boat, racing under the official number U-6, started out as just the Miss Madison and remained that way for a very long time. Sponsorships became a big part of the team after 1988 when the new hull was beginning its racing career. Miss Madison has been sponsored by Mazda, Holset, Kelloggs Frosted Flakes, Jasper Engines and Transmissions, DeWalt Tools, Oberto Sausage Company. HomeStreet Bank began sponsorship starting in 2016. Oberto returned for selected races in 2019 for the second hull. Goodman Real Estate took over in 2021 for selected races, and the team became full-time in 2022.

History of Miss Madison Sponsors Hamm's Beer 1975 Miss Lynnwood 1976 Armstrong's Machine 1977 Starvin Marvin 1977 Dr. Toyota 1980 Frank Kenney Toyota 1981-82 Miss Rich Food Plan Service 1982-83 American Speedy Printing 1984-85 The Ching Group 1985 Holset Miss Madison 1986-90 Holset Miss Mazda 1989-90 Kellogg's 1992-94 Jasper Engines & Transmissions 1995 DeWalt Tools 1995-97 Powerball 1998 Oberto Beef Jerky 2000–15, 2019 (U-1918) Homestreet Bank 2016-present (U-6) Goodman Real Estate 2022-present (U-91)

=== Sponsors by Year and Hull ===
Year	Hull Number	Name
1961	5879	Miss Madison
1962	5879	Miss Madison
1963	5879	Miss Madison
1963	6079	Miss Madison
1964	6079	Miss Madison
1965	6079	Miss Madison
1966	6079	Miss Madison
1967	6079	Miss Madison
1968	6079	Miss Madison
1969	6079	Miss Madison
1970	6079	Miss Madison
1971	6079	Miss Madison
1972	7206	Miss Madison
1973	7206	Miss Madison
1974	7206	Miss Madison
1975	7206	Miss Madison / Hamm's Bear
1976	7206	Miss Madison / Miss Lynnwood
1977	7206	Miss Madison / Barney Armstrong's Machine / Starvin’ Marvin
1978	7325	Miss Madison (Hull originally U-25 Pay’n Pak)
1979	7325	Miss Madison
1980	7325	Dr. Toyota
1981	7325	Frank Kenney Toyota-Volvo
1982	7325	Frank Kenney Toyota-Volvo / Rich Plan Food Service
1983	7325	Frank Kenney Toyota-Volvo / Rich Plan Food Service
1984	7325	American Speedy Printing
1985	7325	American Speedy Printing
1986	7325	Holset - Miss Madison
1987	7325	Holset - Miss Madison
1988	7325	Holset - Miss Madison
1988	8803	Miss Madison (Leased from Cooper's Express)
1988	8806	Holset - Miss Madison / Risley's Holset - Miss Madison
1989	8806	Holset - Miss Madison / Holset Miss Mazda
1990	8806	Holset - Miss Madison / Holset Miss Mazda
1991	8806	Gaylord's at Kilohana / Valvoline Miss Madison / Kellogg's Frosted Flakes
1992	8806	Kellogg's Tony the Tiger
1993	8806	Kellogg's Frosted Flakes
1994	8806	Powerball / Miss Madison
1995	8806	Jasper Engines and Transmissions / Dewalt Tools
1996	8806	Dewalt Tools
1997	8806	Dewalt Tools
1998	8806	Miss Madison
1999	8806	Miss Madison (White)
2000	8806	Miss Madison (Yellow) / Oh Boy! Oberto
2001	8806	Oh Boy! Oberto
2002	8806	Oh Boy! Oberto
2003	8806	Oh Boy! Oberto
2004	8806	Oh Boy! Oberto
2005	8806	Oh Boy! Oberto
2006	8806	Oh Boy! Oberto
2007	0706	Oh Boy! Oberto
2008	0706	Oh Boy! Oberto
2009	0706	Oh Boy! Oberto (U-1)
2010	0706	Oh Boy! Oberto (U-1)
2011	0706	Oh Boy! Oberto (U-1)
2012	0706	Oh Boy! Oberto
2013	0706	Oh Boy! Oberto (U-1)
2014	0706	Oberto
2015	0706	Oberto (U-1)
2016	0706	HomeStreet Bank (U-1)
2017	0706	HomeStreet Bank (U-1)
2018	0706	HomeStreet Bank (U-1) (except San Diego)
2018	1806	HomeStreet Bank (U-1) (San Diego); Miss Madison had acquired Bernie Little's hydroplane racing assets)
2019	1806	HomeStreet Bank (U-6); Entire 2019 season
2019	0706	Oberto Specialty Meats (U-1918); Tri-Cities, Seattle, and San Diego Only
2021	0706	Goodman Real Estate, HomeStreet Bank (U-1); Guntersville and Madison Only
2021	1806	HomeStreet Bank (U-1); Tri-Cities and San Diego Only
2022	1806	HomeStreet Bank (U-1)
2022	0706	Goodman Real Estate (U-91)

from http://www.namba.com

== Drivers ==
Drivers of Miss Madison since 1961.

Driver	Year
Marion Cooper	1961-1963
Morlan Visel	1963
Buddy Byers	1963-1965
Jim McCormick	1966, 1969-1971
Ed O'Halloran	1967-1968
Charlie Dunn	1972-1973
Tom Sheehy	1973, 1982
Milner Irvin	1974, 1978-1981, 1984
Jerry Bangs	1975
Ron Snyder	1976, 1982–84, 1986–88
Jon Peddie	1977-78
Andy Coker	1985-1986
Jerry Hopp	1986, 2000
Mitch Evans	1988
Mike Hanson	1988-98
Todd Yarling	1999
Charley Wiggins	2000
Nate Brown	2000
Steve David	2001-2013
Jon Zimmerman	2011 (Back-up driver for the Gold Cup while Steve David was recovering from injuries from Madison)
Jimmy Shane	2014-22; U-6 (2019)
Jeff Bernard	2019-22; Second boat (2019, 2022-), Primary (Gold Cup, 2021)
Dylan Runne	2023; U-6
Andrew Tate	2023-24; U-91
Brandon Kennedy	2025; U-6
