= Tahoe Miss =

Tahoe Miss was an unlimited hydroplane owned by casino owner Bill Harrah. It raced in the 1960s with Mira Slovak driving it in 1966 to both the National High Point Championship and an American Power Boat Association Gold Cup victory on the Detroit River.
