= Miss Detroit =

The Miss Detroit hydroplane, piloted by Jack Beebe, won the 1915 American Power Boat Association Gold Cup on Manhasset Bay, outside of New York City. As a result of the victory, Detroit Michigan won the right to host the Gold Cup race the following year (1916), thus thrusting the City of Detroit and the Detroit River into Gold Cup hydroplane racing and making Detroit a major venue for the sport.
