= Carl Amari =

American film and television producer, actor, director (born 1963)

- Born: August 20, 1963 (age 62)
- Occupation(s): television producer, actor, director, radio host
- Known for: When Radio Was

Carl Amari (born August 20, 1963) is an American film and television producer, actor, director, and syndicated radio host. He is the creator of When Radio Was.

== Biography ==
Amari attended Triton College and Columbia College.

He founded the company Radio Spirits, which he sold in 1998 for $12 million.

Amari has acted in several motion picture and television projects, including Madison (2001), which he produced. It opened the Sundance Film Festival.

In 2007, Amari produced the Word of Promise audio Bible (NKJV translation) published by Thomas Nelson, Inc.

Irving Brecher, creator of The Life of Riley, praised Amari for paying royalties, which has historically not been common practice in the radio drama community. Amari has threatened legal action against classic radio show collectors who distribute episodes online. Some in the classic radio community find this problematic, as the community's long history of collecting and sharing episodes is partially credited with the survival of radio shows into the 21st century.

He co-wrote a book, The Top 100 Classic Radio Shows, with Martin Grams Jr. It was published in 2017.

== Bibliography ==
- The Top 100 Classic Radio Shows, Carl Amari, Martin Grams, 2017 ISBN 9781684121274
