= Miss Thriftway =

American hydroplane

Miss Thriftway was an unlimited hydroplane in the 1950s and 1960s.

The Miss Thrifway was owned by Williard Rhodes, the President of Associated Grocers, (AG) a Co-Op that represented more than 650 stores. The Miss Thriftway raced from 1955 to 1963

With Bill Muncey driving, the boat won the 1956 and 1957 American Power Boat Association Gold Cup.
