= Jim Hendrick =

American sports announcer

Jim Hendrick (July 26, 1934 - June 15, 2017) was an American sports announcer. Hendrick worked in sports broadcasting for over 50 years. He gained fame for his work as a spokesman for Anheuser-Busch and his association with the American Power Boat Association.

For several years in the 1960s, Hendrick was the play by play announcer for the Detroit Pistons on WKBD, channel 50, Detroit.

Hendrick was a member of the Detroit Sports Broadcasters Association, which was founded in 1948 by Detroit Tigers announcer Ty Tyson.

Hendrick died at the age of 82 in Lakeland, Florida.
