= Bardahl =

Brand of lubricants and additives for internal combustion engines

Bardahl Manufacturing Corporation
- Type: Private
- Industry: Automotive
- Founded: 1939 in Seattle, Washington
- Founder: Ole Bardahl
- Headquarters: Seattle, US
- Area served: 90 countries
- Key people: Evelyn Bardahl McNeil, Chairman of the Board; Hugh McNeil, President and CEO; Oscar Federico Márquez, Chief Operating Officer
- Products: Oil additives, lubricants, gasoline additives
- Brands: Bardahl, Protex by Bardahl
- Revenue: US$ 21,402,000 (2015)
- Number of employees: 34
- Website: bardahl.com

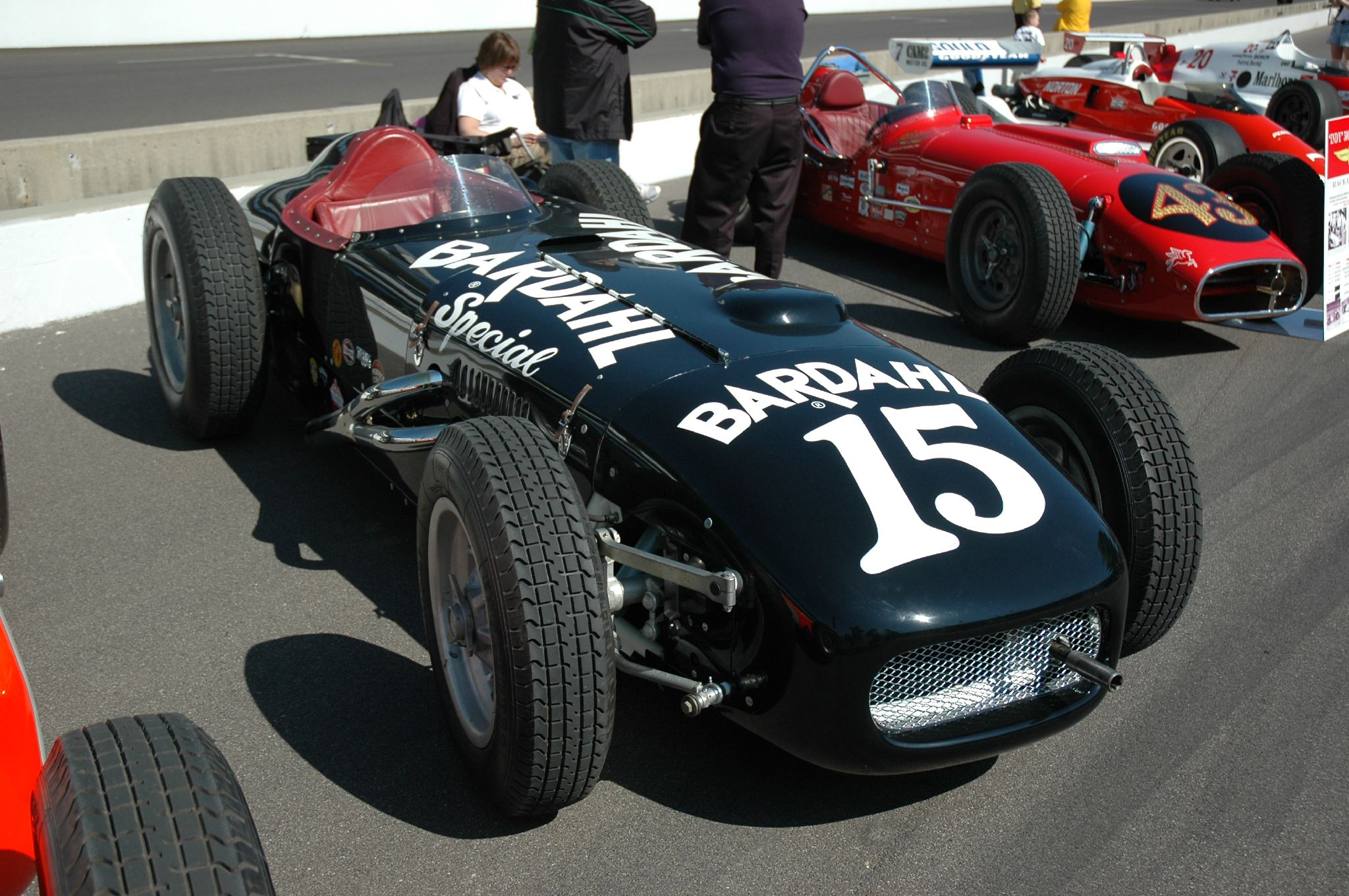
Kurtis 500B Bardahl Special driven in the 1955 Indianapolis 500

Bardahl is a brand of petroleum oil additives, lubricants and gasoline additives for motor vehicles and internal combustion engines made by Bardahl Manufacturing Corporation in Seattle, Washington.

== Ole Bardahl ==
Bardahl Oil Company was founded in 1939 by Ole Bardahl (January 28, 1902 – August 11, 1989), a Norwegian immigrant to the United States. Ole Bardahl arrived in Seattle in 1922 with $29 in his pocket. He became a millionaire by the age of 39 as a general contractor in Seattle, building homes. After that, he founded the Bardahl Oil Company in the Ballard neighborhood of Seattle. The company is still owned and managed by the Bardahl family.

== 1950s ==
The company's original factories are located in Ballard at 1400 N.W. 52nd Street and has a large neon sign on top of the building that would flash "ADD BARDAHL, ADD IT TO YOUR OIL, ADD IT TO YOUR GAS" and light up the image of a car when it was on. This sign would become a Ballard Landmark and was even featured in one of the intros for Almost Live! in the 1980s. In the mid-1950s, Bardahl was the leading brand of motor oil and oil additives in the United States. Bardahl's oil additive was advertised during the 1950s in magazines and animated TV commercials which showed the product's effectiveness in combating engine problems such as "Dirty Sludge" ("Mucky Sludge" in some commercials), "Sticky Valves," "Gummy Rings," "Seymour Pollution," and "Blackie Carbon," all of which were anthropomorphized in the commercials.

== 1960s ==
In the early 1960s York Research Corporation, an independent commercial testing laboratory of Glenbrook, Connecticut conducted controlled testing on Bardahl. As the result of those tests, York President Warren C. Hyer was featured in regional and national Bardahl television advertisements touting the benefits of Bardahl as an oil additive. For many years the York Research company seal could be found on all cans of Bardahl.

== Miss Bardahl ==
The company remains prominent as a result of its sponsorship of motor sports competitors. The Miss Bardahl Hydroplane U-40 was a six-time National Champion and five-time Gold Cup winner, racing in the United States from 1957 to 1969. There was another Miss Bardahl that was used for the 1957 season (U-4) that was turned into the Miss Burien hydroplane in 1958.

Ole was inducted into the Motorsports Hall of Fame of America in 2014.

== 21st century ==
In the early 21st century, Bardahl products were found in many countries. At this time, the Bardahl product line included over 250 products, including engine oils, motor oil and fuel additives, and specialty lubricants. The company had expanded to foreign markets, opening plants in countries such as France, Belgium, Italy, Argentina, Brazil and Singapore.

== Sponsorships ==
Bardahl has been involved in racing, using events as proving grounds for its products, as well as for the new technologies produced by the company's research and development arm. Types included Unlimited Hydroplanes, offshore powerboats, unlimited air racing, IndyCars, CART Racing, NASCAR, motorcycle and snowmobile racing. Al Young's Bardahl sponsored World Championship winning 1970 Dodge Challenger is part of the Museum of History and Industry (MOHAI) artifact collection in Seattle, WA. Formula 1 drivers such as Fangio, Gurney and Fittipaldi are associated with the Bardahl brand.

Bardhal products were often given away as promotional products to studio audience members or contestants on The Gong Show.

Bardahl is a sponsor in professional wrestling's Lucha Libre AAA Worldwide, often as a ring floor sponsor and sponsoring the Bardahl Cup events that are part of Triplemania.

== OEM recognition ==
Bardahl has network of distributors in 90 countries under brands such as Bardahl and Protex by Bardahl. Formulations meet or exceed OEM Top Tier Performance requirements for the automotive industry: Audi - BMW - Chrysler - Citroën - Ferrari - Fiat - Ford - GM - Honda - Hyundai - Mazda - Mercedes - Mitsubishi - Peugeot - Porsche - Renault - Volkswagen
