= Jeff Bernard =

American motorboat racer

Jeff Bernard is an unlimited hydroplane driver from Allen Park, Michigan. He is a fourth-generation driver and is the nephew of former drivers Mike Weber and Mark Weber and step son of former driver Terry Troxell.

Bernard won the Madison Regatta in 2008 and the Thunder on the Ohio race in 2009 driving the U-5 Miss Formulaboats.com hydroplane.
