= Oryx Cup =

- Oryx Cup – UIM World Championship
- Sport: H1 Unlimited
- Founded: 2009
- Country: Doha, Doha Municipality, Qatar
- Most recent champions: J. Michael Kelly, U-1 Graham Trucking (2014)
- Most titles: J. Michael Kelly and Jimmy Shane (2 each)
- Website: Oryx Cup website

The Oryx Cup is a hydroplane boat race in the H1 Unlimited season. The race was held in November in Doha Bay on the Persian Gulf in Doha, Doha Municipality, Qatar. From 2009–2014, the Oryx Cup was designated as the host for the UIM World Championship.

== History ==
The Oryx Cup was founded in January 2009 when H1 Unlimited and the Qatar Marine Sports Federation (QMSF) reached an agreement to have the final race of the 2009 H1 Unlimited hydroplane season in Doha, Qatar. The 2009 event was also sanctioned as the UIM Unlimited Hydroplane World Championship.

For the 2010–2014 H1 Unlimited seasons, the Oryx Cup was designated as the host of the UIM H1 Unlimited Oryx Cup World Championship.

== List of Oryx Cup winners ==
UIM #	Year	Driver	Boat
17	2009	J. Michael Kelly	U-7 Graham Trucking
18	2010	Dave Villwock	Spirit of Qatar
19	2011	Scott Liddycoat	U-7 Valken.com
20	2012	Jimmy Shane	U-5 Graham Trucking
21	2013	Jimmy Shane	U-5 Graham Trucking
22	2014	J. Michael Kelly	U-1 Graham Trucking

== List of Prior UIM World Unlimited Hydroplane Champions ==
The following list are winners of UIM sanctioned unlimited (Gold Cup class) hydroplane world championship events.

#	Year	Driver	Boat	Location
1	1938	Theo Rossi	Alago	Paris (France), Venice (Italy), Detroit, MI (APBA Gold Cup), Washington, DC (four race series)
2	1939	Guy Simmons	My Sin	Venice (Italy), Detroit, MI (APBA Gold Cup), Washington, DC (three race series)
3	1965	Ron Musson	Miss Bardahl	Stateline, NV
4	1967	Bill Sterett, Sr.	Miss Chrysler Crew	Detroit, MI
5	1968	Bill Muncey	Miss U.S.	Seattle, WA
6	1969	Bill Muncey	Miss U.S.	Detroit, MI
7	1972	Bill Muncey	Atlas Van Lines	Madison, IN
8	1973	Mickey Remund	Pay 'N Pack	Seattle, WA
9	1974	George Henley	Pay 'N Pack	Tri-Cities, WA
10	1980	Bill Mincey	Atlas Van Lines	Seattle, WA
11	1981	Dean Chenoweth	Miss Budweiser	Acapulco (Mexico)
12	1982	Chip Hanauer	Atlas Van Lines	Houston, TX
13	1983	Milner Irvin	Miss Renault	Houston, TX
14	1984	Steve Reynolds	Miss Tosti Asti	Houston, TX
15	2004	Dave Villwock	Miss Budweiser	Madison, IN
16	2006	Jean Theoret	Miss Beacon Plumbing	San Diego, CA

Note: The 1961 World Championship Seafair Trophy (won by Ron Musson of Miss Bardahl) was not a sanctioned UIM event
