= Seafair Cup =

Hydroplane boat race on Lake Washington in Seattle

HomeStreet Bank Cup

Event information
- Type: H1 Unlimited hydroplane boat race
- Race area: Lake Washington, Seattle, Washington
- Dates: July 31-August 2
- Sponsor: HomeStreet Bank
- Distance: 2.5 mi (4 km)
- Media coverage: KIRO-TV/KKNW (AM)
- First race: 1951
- Former names: Seafair Cup
- Website: www.seafair.com/default.aspx

The Seafair Cup (branded as the HomeStreet Bank Cup for sponsorship reasons, and formerly the Albert Lee Appliance Cup), is an H1 Unlimited hydroplane boat race held annually in late July and early August on Lake Washington in Seattle, Washington. The race is the main attraction of the annual Seafair festival. Seattle has hosted the Seafair Cup consecutively since 1951. The event was part of the APBA Gold Cup for the following years: 1951 to 1955, 1957 to 1959, 1962, 1965, 1967, 1974, 1981, and 1985.

== History ==
Seattle's history of unlimited hydroplane racing dates back to July 1950, when it was announced that the APBA Gold Cup was leaving Detroit in favor of Seattle. Slo-mo-shun IV, owned by Stanley Sayres, won the Gold Cup race in Detroit that year. At that time, the Gold Cup was run at the home of the winner, so for 1951, the Gold Cup was coming to Seattle. The race was added to the Seafair festival. When the Gold Cup left Seattle for Detroit in 1955, local officials decided to hold a race of their own, and the Seafair Cup was born.

The 1951 Seattle race was co-sponsored through 1960 by the Seattle Yacht Club. Greater Seattle, Inc. (later renamed Seafair, Inc.) became the sole sponsor of the race, starting in 1961. The Seafair Boat Club, which administers the Seattle race on Seafair's behalf, was organized in 1975.

Lou Fageol won the very first Seattle race driving Stan Sayres' Slo-mo-shun V. The Emerald City has hosted the Unlimiteds every year from 1951 to 2019. In 2020 and 2021, the event was cancelled because of the COVID-19 pandemic. The next unlimited hydroplane race in Seattle is planned for 2022.

== Past Seattle Unlimited Hydroplane Winners ==
The following boats and drivers won in Seattle:

Seattle Unlimited Hydroplane Race Winners
Year	Event	Boat	Driver
1951	APBA Gold Cup	Slo-mo-shun V	Lou Fageol
1951	Seafair Trophy	Slo-mo-shun V	Ted Jones
1952	APBA Gold Cup	Slo-mo-shun IV	Stanley Dollar
1953	APBA Gold Cup	Slo-mo-shun IV	Joe Taggart
1954	APBA Gold Cup	Slo-mo-shun V	Lou Fageol
1955	APBA Gold Cup	Gale V	Lee Schoenith
1956	Seafair Trophy	Shanty I	Russ Schleeh
1957	APBA Gold Cup	Miss Thriftway	Bill Muncey
1958	APBA Gold Cup	Hawaii Ka’i III	Jack Regas
1959	APBA Gold Cup	Maverick	Bill Stead
1960	Seafair Trophy	Miss Thriftway	Bill Muncey
1961	"World’s Championship Seafair Trophy"	Miss Bardahl	Ron Musson
1961	Seattle Trophy	Miss Madison	Marion Cooper
1961	Seafair Queen's Trophy	Fascination	Bob Gilliam
1962	APBA Gold Cup	Miss Century 21	Bill Muncey
1963	Seafair Trophy	Tahoe Miss	Chuck Thompson
1964	Seafair Trophy	Miss Bardahl	Ron Musson
1965	APBA Gold Cup	Miss Bardahl	Ron Musson
1966	Seafair Trophy	My Gypsy	Jim Ranger
1967	Seafair Trophy	Miss Chrysler Crew	Mira Slovak
1967	APBA Gold Cup	Miss Bardahl	Billy Schumacher
1968	U.I.M. World's Championship	Miss U. S.	Bill Muncey
1969	Seafair Trophy	Miss Budweiser	Bill Sterett
1970	Seafair Trophy	Miss Budweiser	Dean Chenoweth
1971	Seafair Trophy	Pride of Pay ‘n Pak	Billy Schumacher
1972	Seafair Trophy	Atlas Van Lines	Bill Muncey
1973	U.I.M. World's Championship	Pay ‘n Pak	Mickey Remund
1974	APBA Gold Cup	Pay ‘n Pak	George Henley
1975	Seafair Trophy	Pay ‘n Pak	George Henley
1976	Seafair Trophy	Miss Budweiser	Mickey Remund
1977	Seafair Trophy	Atlas Van Lines	Bill Muncey
1978	Squire Seafair Trophy	Atlas Van Lines	Bill Muncey
1979	Squire Seafair Trophy	Atlas Van Lines	Bill Muncey
1980	U.I.M. World's Championship Seafair Trophy	Atlas Van Lines	Bill Muncey
1981	APBA Gold Cup	Miss Budweiser	Dean Chenoweth
1982	Emerald Cup	Atlas Van Lines	Chip Hanauer
1983	Sea Galley Emerald Cup	Miss Budweiser	Jim Kropfeld
1984	7-Eleven Freedom Cup	Miss Budweiser	Jim Kropfeld
1985	Budweiser APBA Gold Cup	Miller American	Chip Hanauer
1986	Emerald Cup	Miller American	Chip Hanauer
1987	Emerald Cup	Miss Budweiser	Jim Kropfeld
1988	Budweiser Cup	Miss Budweiser	Tom D’Eath
1989	Rainier Cup	Miss Circus Circus	Chip Hanauer
1990	Rainier Cup	Miss Circus Circus	Chip Hanauer
1991	Seafair Trophy	Miss Budweiser	Scott Pierce
1992	Rainier Cup	Tide	George Woods, Jr.
1993	Texaco Cup	Miss Budweiser	Chip Hanauer
1994	Texaco Cup	PICO American Dream	Dave Villwock
1995	Texaco Cup	Miss Budweiser	Chip Hanauer ...
1996	Texaco Cup	PICO American Dream	Dave Villwock
1997	Seafair Texaco Cup	PICO American Dream	Mark Evans
1998	Texaco Cup	Miss Budweiser	Dave Villwock
1999	General Motors Cup	Miss Budweiser	Dave Villwock
2000	General Motors Cup	Miss Budweiser	Dave Villwock
2001	General Motors Cup	Miss E-Lam Plus	Nate Brown
2002	General Motors Cup	Miss Budweiser	Dave Villwock
2003	General Motors Cup	Miss Budweiser	Dave Villwock
2004	General Motors Cup	Miss Budweiser	Dave Villwock
2005	Chevrolet Cup	Llumar Window Film	Jean Theoret
2006	Chevrolet Cup	Miss Beacon Plumbing	Jean Theoret
2007	Chevrolet Cup	Oh Boy! Oberto	Steve David
2008	Chevrolet Cup	Amos W. Hoss	Dave Villwock
2009	Chevrolet Cup	Ellstrom E-Lam Plus	Dave Villwock
2010	Albert Lee Cup	Oh Boy! Oberto	Steve David
2011	Albert Lee Cup	Oh Boy! Oberto	Steve David
2012	Albert Lee Cup	Oh Boy!Oberto	Steve David
2013	Albert Lee Cup	Graham Trucking	Jimmy Shane
2014	Albert Lee Cup	Graham Trucking	J. Michael Kelly
2015	Albert Lee Appliance Cup	Graham Trucking	J. Michael Kelly
2016	Albert Lee Appliance Seafair Cup	Les Schwab	Andrew Tate
2017	Albert Lee Appliance Seafair Cup	Miss HomeStreet	Jimmy Shane
2018	Albert Lee Seafair Cup	Delta Realtrac	Andrew Tate
2019	HomeStreet Bank Cup	Graham Trucking	J. Michael Kelly
2020	No event - COVID-19 Pandemic		
2021	No event - COVID-19 Pandemic		
2022	HomeStreet Bank Cup	U-9 Boitano Homes	J. Michael Kelly
