= Bill Muncey =

American hydroplane racer (1928–1981)

Muncey

William Edward Muncey (November 12, 1928 – October 18, 1981) was an American hydroplane racer from Detroit, Michigan. The International Motorsports Hall of Fame and hydroplane historian Dan Cowie described Muncey as "without question, the greatest hydroplane racer in history." Muncey was nicknamed "Mr. Unlimited" and won 62 races, which was the most races in the history of the sport until Dave Villwock broke his record in 2011.

== Racing career ==
Muncey began his boat racing career in 1949 by sinking in front of a hometown crowd on the Detroit River. Muncey's first attempt to drive in an American Power Boat Association (APBA) Gold Cup event began by blowing up the engine. Muncey went to Gar Wood’s riverfront mansion, and asked Wood for help. Muncey got an engine from Wood, but the bottom of the boat fell out during the next race.

Muncey had his first win at the Gold Cup in 1956 in Miss Thriftway. He followed that with another Gold Cup win in 1957, again in Miss Thriftway. In 1960, Muncey won fourteen races between 1960 and 1962, including six of seven in 1962. In 1976, at age 48, he won five races in his boat Atlas Van Lines to silence the critics that said that he was too old to win. He moved to a new Atlas Van Lines boat in 1977 and won twenty times in the next three seasons. Muncey attributed much of his success to his close friend and an accomplished aeronautical engineer, D.J. Nolan, Sr. of Bloomfield Hills, Michigan. He followed up with four wins in 1980.

In 1981, Muncey won his last race during the Thunder on the Ohio race at Evansville. On October 18 in Acapulco, Mexico, he was leading the final heat of the World Championship race, but was thrown from the boat in a blowover crash while travelling 175 mph (282 km/h), suffering injuries that would be fatal.

In more than three decades of hydroplane racing, Muncey had claimed eight Gold Cups (1956, 1957, 1961, 1962, 1972, 1977, 1978, 1979), seven U.S. National Championships (1960, 1961, 1962, 1972, 1976, 1978, 1979), and four World Championships (1968, 1969, 1972, and 1980). He was named the driver of the year seven times.

As owners, the Muncey family won six High Points Champions (1976, 1978, 1979, 1982, 1983, 1985), with his widow Fran retaining the team with the Atlas Van Lines "Blue Blaster" brand until the end of the 1984 season, when Miller Brewing Company took over sponsorship in 1985 as the Miller American, with the 1988 season being branded as Miller High Life, as part of a deal between NASCAR driver Bobby Allison and his friend Sam Bass where Miller rebranded all motorsport under the High Life brand using a Bass-designed livery for all motorsport sponsored by Miller. Chip Hanauer drove the Muncey operation throughout her control before the team was bought out by Circus Circus at the end of the 1988 season.

The Muncey "Blue Blaster" that he raced from 1977 until his death in 1981 was taken to the Hydroplane and Race Boat Museum in Seattle for restoration in 2011, and during the 2015 Seafair, Hanauer drove the restored boat for its first official appearance since the blowover. (Safety harnesses were not used in hydroplanes until Hanauer's debut in the 1982 "Blue Blaster", and another year before Dean Chenoweth's death led to the development of the safety capsules used in the sport). During the 2024 Motorsports Hall of Fame of America induction ceremony, a 1979 photo of the Atlas Van Lines after a mechanical failure at the San Diego Bayfair Cup featured Muncey standing in the front, and a 4-year old Jimmie Johnson sitting on the rear resurfaced during his induction. Fran Muncey and Chip Hanauer invited Johnson to drive the restored boat, which Johnson did for the Motorsports Hall of Fame of America. Johnson drove the restored 1977 Blue Blaster at Seafair on August 1, 2025.

== Awards ==
- Muncey was inducted in the International Motorsports Hall of Fame in 2004.
- He was inducted in the Motorsports Hall of Fame of America in 1989 in the Power Boats category. His widow Fran was also inducted in the hall in 2021 for her accomplishments as a solo owner after his death.
- Muncey was awarded the National Marine Manufacturers Association Hall of Fame Award in 1988.
- The H1 Unlimited High Points Championship Driver's Trophy is named for Muncey, as of 2011.

== Personal life ==
Muncey graduated from Royal Oak High School in Michigan in 1947. He attended Rollins College in Winter Park, Florida, where he was initiated as a member of Lambda Chi Alpha fraternity. He was twice married and had four children.

== Biography ==
- Hogg, Tony (1979). Thunderboating with Bill Muncey. ISBN 0-931570-01-8. OCLC 78050492.
- Garey, Stephen A. (1982). Bill Muncey: Boat Racing Legend. Unlimiteds Detroit. LCCN 91-672. OCLC 10601864.
- Muntz, A. J. (2013). At the Ragged Edge. CreateSpace Independent Publishing Platform. ISBN 978-1-48194-905-7.
