= Bernie Little =

American motorboat racer (died 2003)

Bernie Little (October 7, 1925 - April 25, 2003) was an American businessman, beer distributor, and the most successful owner in Unlimited Hydroplane racing history. Based in Lakeland, Florida, he was best known as the longtime owner of the Miss Budweiser unlimited hydroplane team, which under his leadership became one of the most successful and recognizable teams in the history of the sport. Over four decades, his boats won 134 of the 354 races they entered, including 22 national championships and 14 Gold Cups. Little was widely credited with popularizing the sport through major sponsorships, television exposure, and safety innovations, and was regarded by contemporaries as one of its most influential figures.

== Early life and career ==
Little was born in McComb, Ohio, on October 7, 1925. He left school during the Great Depression and worked various jobs including delivering newspapers and caddying, before joining the Merchant Marines and later the U.S. Navy during World War II. On New Year's Eve 1943, he married Jane Cunningham; the couple remained married for 59 years until his death.

After the war, Little worked in his family's restaurant and then in car sales, before moving into aviation where he sold airplanes and operated as a fixed-base operator in Tampa and St. Petersburg. He was also an avid pilot, flying aerobatic stunt shows. By the 1950s, he had become a successful entrepreneur with ventures in hotels, nightclubs, hardware, and aircraft sales.

In 1972, encouraged by August Busch III of Anheuser-Busch, Little took over a vacant Anheuser-Busch distributorship in Polk County, Florida, and moved to Lakeland, where he became the exclusive wholesaler for multiple counties.

== Hydroplane Racing Career ==
=== Founding of Miss Budweiser ===
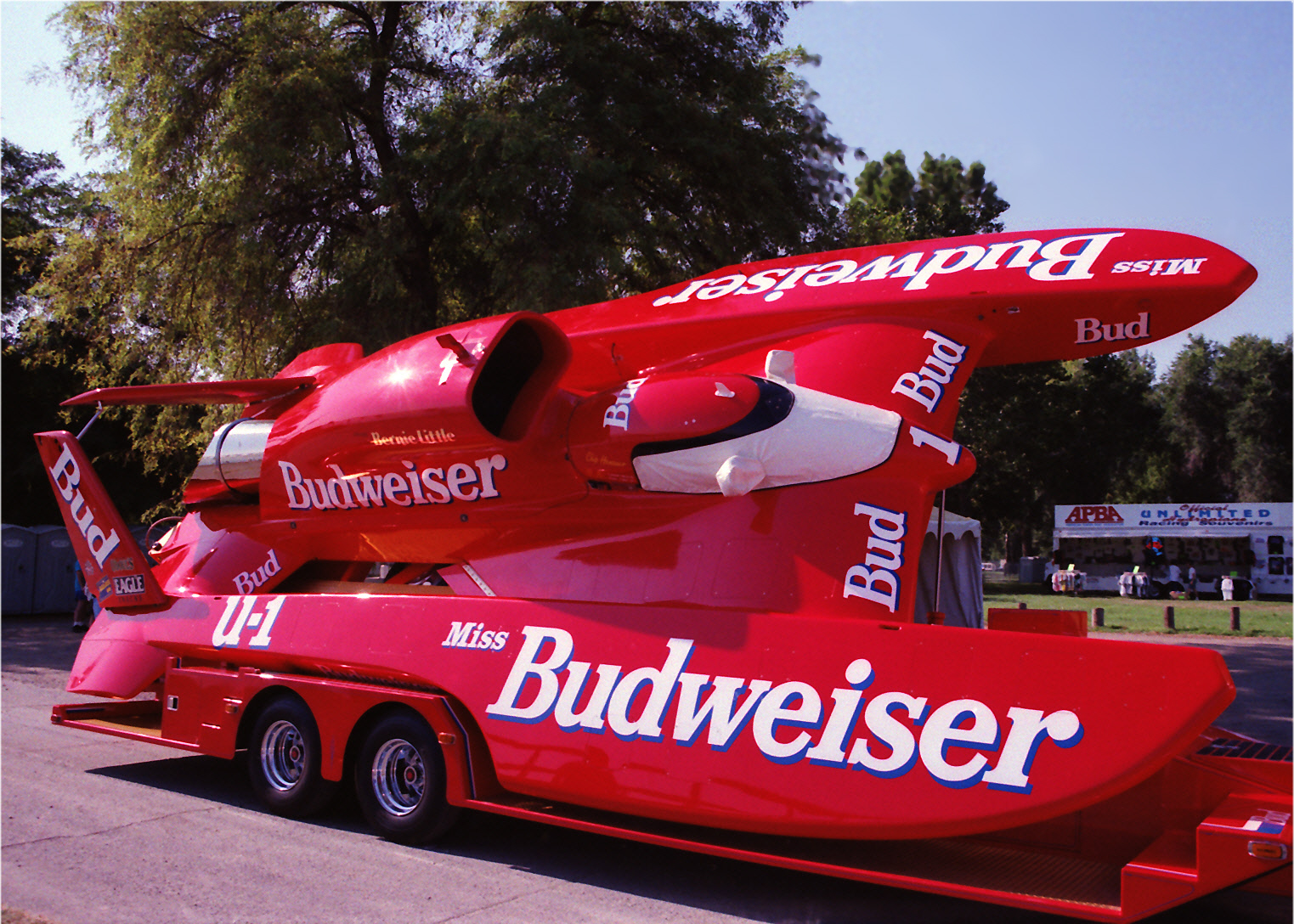
One of 22 hydroplanes that competed as Miss Budweiser during the team's history.

In 1962, while operating his aviation business in St. Petersburg, Little acquired his first hydroplane by trading a cabin cruiser for it. He kept the boat near his hangar, where it caught the attention of August Busch III of Anheuser-Busch. After taking Busch for a ride, Little suggested that Budweiser sponsor the boat — an offer Busch accepted. The partnership created Miss Budweiser, beginning a sponsorship and ensuing sport-wide dominance that would last four decades and transform unlimited hydroplane racing.

=== Rise to Prominence ===
Little's first major win came at the Columbia Cup on the Columbia River in 1966, when driver Bill Brow won at an average speed of 98 mph. In 1969, Miss Budweiser, driven by Bill Sterett, won the Dixie Cup Regatta in Guntersville, Alabama.

=== Safety and Tragedy ===
From the beginning, Little's teams were affected by the dangers of unlimited hydroplane racing. In June 1966, Little's Miss Budweiser was part of the deadliest day in unlimited hydroplane racing history. At the President's Cup Regatta on the Potomac River in Washington, D.C., three drivers were killed in two separate accidents. In the final heat, Miss Budweiser, driven by Don Wilson, collided with Rex Manchester's Notre Dame on the backstretch, killing both men instantly. Earlier the same afternoon, three-time national champion Ron Musson had died when Miss Bardahl exploded at high speed. The triple fatality was the worst tragedy in the sport's history. For Little, who had entered the sport only a few years earlier, the accident was a devastating early setback. Miss Budweiser was noted at the time as the lightest boat in the fleet and among the fastest under calm conditions, but Wilson had only recently begun driving the craft. Despite the disaster, Little remained committed to hydroplane racing, and in later years became a leading advocate for improved driver safety, including the adoption of enclosed cockpits.

In 1979, driver Dean Chenoweth survived a 220 mph crash while attempting to break the straightaway world speed record. Little credited “the flak jacket and the Lord” with saving Chenoweth's life, noting that the protective vest had been crushed in the wreck.

Chenoweth returned to racing but was killed in 1982 during qualifying at the Columbia Cup in Pasco, Washington, when Miss Budweiser flipped after encountering a gust of wind. Following the accident, Little's team pioneered the enclosed cockpit for hydroplanes, which has since been credited with saving drivers’ lives.

=== Dominance and Innovations ===
By the 1990s, Miss Budweiser was often described as the “New York Yankees” of hydroplane racing, fielding budgets estimated at $3 million annually—several times larger than competing teams. Little's boats won consistently, with drivers including Chip Hanauer, Jim Kropfeld, Tom D’Eath, and later Dave Villwock. His dominance drew both admiration and criticism; Hanauer remarked that “sports is all about drama, and he added that … you need someone to love and someone to hate, and he was that guy.” Despite his fierce reputation, Villwock recalled Little as cautious with his drivers, often urging them to slow down rather than take excessive risks. Little was also known as an ambassador for the sport, hosting reporters and crews in his motorcoach and providing meals for teams at race sites.

== Community involvement and personal life ==
Outside of racing, Little was a philanthropist and civic leader in Lakeland. He was described as a “legendary entrepreneur, racer, and giver” by U.S. Rep. Adam Putnam, and credited with raising the profile of Lakeland nationally. He and his wife Jane had three children: Becky, Bernie Jr., and Joe.

== Death and legacy ==
Little died on April 25, 2003, in Lakeland, Florida, at the age of 77 from complications of pneumonia. His death raised questions about the future of both Miss Budweiser and the sport itself, with many noting that Anheuser-Busch's sponsorship under Little had long dominated hydroplane racing and deterred rival sponsors. At the time of his death, he had been married to Jane for 59 years. His son Joe Little took over leadership of the Miss Budweiser team. The following year the team dissolved, and Anheuser-Busch ended their involvement with the sport.
