= HAPO Columbia Cup =

Annual boat race

Event information
- Type: H1 Unlimited hydroplane boat race
- Race area: Columbia River, Tri-Cities, Washington
- Dates: July 24–26
- Sponsor: HAPO Community Credit Union
- Distance: 2.5 mi (4 km)
- Media coverage: KNDU-TV
- First race: 1966
- Former names: Atomic Cup; Columbia Cup
- Website: www.waterfollies.com

The HAPO Columbia Cup is an H1 Unlimited hydroplane boat race held each July on the Columbia River in Columbia Park, Tri-Cities, Washington. The race is the main attraction of the annual Water Follies festivities. With the exception of 2020, Tri-Cities has hosted a race consecutively since 1966.

== History ==
The Columbia River towns of Kennewick, Pasco, and Richland first climbed on the Unlimited bandwagon in 1966 with the first annual Tri-Cities Atomic Cup. There had been talk of inviting the Unlimiteds there as early as 1958. But 1966 was when it finally happened. Bill Brow was the winner that first year, driving Bernie Little's Miss Budweiser.

Driver Dave Villwock and the Miss Elam Plus team won the 2006 Columbia Cup under extraordinary circumstances. Their boat "blew over" during the running of preliminary Heat 2-A. They rebounded in time to win the next two heats and the overall championship.

After the race at Detroit, the home of the annual Gold Cup race, was originally cancelled in 2015, the Gold Cup was moved to the Tri-Cities race, renaming the race to the Gold Cup for that year. When the Detroit race came back at the end of 2015 and into 2016, the Gold Cup returned to the city, and the Tri-Cities race returned to the "Columbia Cup" again.

The race is run on a 2.5 mile oval course located in an area on the Columbia River referred to as the "McNary Pool."

== List of Tri-Cities Unlimited Hydroplane Champions ==
Champions of Tri-Cities Unlimited Hydroplane Events
Year	Event	Boat	Driver
1966	Atomic Cup	Miss Budweiser	Bill Brow
1967	Atomic Cup	Miss Bardahl	Billy Schumacher
1968	Atomic Cup	Miss Eagle Electric	Warner Gardner
1969	Atomic Cup	MYR’s Special	Dean Chenoweth
1970	Atomic Cup	Pay ‘n Pak ‘Lil Buzzard	Tommy Fults
1971	Atomic Cup	Miss Madison	Jim McCormick
1972	Atomic Cup	Atlas Van Lines	Bill Muncey
1973	APBA Gold Cup	Miss Budweiser	Dean Chenoweth
1974	U.I.M. World’s Championship	Pay ‘n Pak	George Henley
1975	APBA Gold Cup	Pay ‘n Pak	George Henley
1976	Columbia Cup	Atlas Van Lines	Bill Muncey
1977	APBA Gold Cup	Atlas Van Lines	Bill Muncey
1978	Columbia Cup	Miss Budweiser	Ron Snyder
1979	Columbia Cup	Atlas Van Lines	Bill Muncey
1980	Columbia Cup	Atlas Van Lines	Bill Muncey
1981	Columbia Cup	The Squire Shop	Chip Hanauer
1982	Columbia Cup	The Squire Shop	Tom D’Eath
1983	Columbia Cup	American Speedy Printing	Jack Schafer, Jr.
1984	APBA Gold Cup	Atlas Van Lines	Chip Hanauer
1985	Columbia Cup	Miller American	Chip Hanauer
1986	Columbia Cup	Miller American	Chip Hanauer
1987	Columbia Cup	Miss Budweiser	Jim Kropfeld
1988	Columbia Cup	Miss Budweiser	Tom D’Eath
1989	Columbia Cup	Cooper’s Express	Mitch Evans
1990	Columbia Cup	Miss Budweiser	Tom D’Eath
1991	Columbia Cup	Winston Eagle	Mark Tate
1992	Budweiser Columbia Cup	Miss Budweiser	Chip Hanauer
1993	Budweiser Columbia Cup	Miss Budweiser	Chip Hanauer
1994	Budweiser Columbia Cup	Miss Budweiser	Chip Hanauer
1995	Budweiser Columbia Cup	Smokin’ Joe’s	Mark Tate
1996	Budweiser Columbia Cup	PICO American Dream	Dave Villwock
1997	Budweiser Columbia Cup	PICO American Dream	Mark Evans
1998	Budweiser Columbia Cup	Miss Budweiser	Dave Villwock
1999	Budweiser Columbia Cup	Miss Budweiser	Dave Villwock
2000	Budweiser Columbia Cup	Miss E-Lam Plus	Mark Evans
2001	Budweiser Columbia Cup	Znetix II	Terry Troxell
2002	Budweiser Columbia Cup	Miss E-Lam Plus	Nate Brown
2003	Budweiser Columbia Cup	Llumar Window Film	Mark Evans
2004	Budweiser Columbia Cup	Miss Budweiser	Dave Villwock
2005	Budweiser Columbia Cup	Ellstrom E-Lam Plus	Dave Villwock
2006	Atomic Cup	Ellstrom E-Lam Plus	Dave Villwock
2007	Lamb Weston Columbia Cup	Ellstrom E-Lam Plus	Dave Villwock
2008	Lamb Weston Columbia Cup	Oh Boy! Oberto	Steve David
2009	Lamb Weston Columbia Cup	Oh Boy! Oberto	Steve David
2010	Lamb Weston Columbia Cup	Oh Boy! Oberto	Steve David
2011	Lamb Weston Columbia Cup	Spirit of Qatar	Dave Villwock
2012	Lamb Weston Columbia Cup	Graham Trucking	Jimmy Shane
2013	Lamb Weston Columbia Cup	Oh Boy! Oberto	Steve David
2014	HAPO Columbia Cup	Oberto	Jimmy Shane
2015	HAPO APBA Gold Cup	Oberto	Jimmy Shane
2016	HAPO Columbia Cup	Miss HomeStreet	Jimmy Shane
2017	HAPO Columbia Cup	Graham Trucking	J. Michael Kelly
2018	HAPO Columbia Cup	Delta Realtrac	Andrew Tate
2019	HAPO Columbia Cup	Graham Trucking	J. Michael Kelly
2021	HAPO Columbia Cup	Pinnacle Peak Consulting	Corey Peabody
2022	HAPO Columbia Cup	Miss Homestreet	Jimmy Shane
2023	HAPO Columbia Cup	Beacon Plumbing	Corey Peabody
2024	Apollo Columbia Cup	Beacon Plumbing	Corey Peabody
2025	Apollo APBA Gold Cup	Miss Apollo	Dave Villwock
