= Chip Hanauer =

American hydroplane racer

Lee Edward "Chip" Hanauer (born July 1, 1954, in Seattle) is the third most successful Unlimited Hydroplane racer in history. He has won the APBA Gold Cup a record 11 times and was the driver of one of the most famous boats in APBA history, the Miss Budweiser, in the early to mid-1990s. He was inducted into the International Motorsports Hall of Fame in 1995 as their youngest inductee. In 2005, he was inducted into the International Motorized Vehicles Hall of Fame. In 1991, he temporarily left the waters for auto racing only to return a season later.

Hanauer was born on July 1, 1954, in Seattle. He grew up with a poster of the international Grand Prix auto racing star Jim Clark of Scotland on the wall of his boyhood bedroom. But finances and his home in Seattle, Washington – a major center of boat racing – dictated that he start in small hydroplanes. Hanauer graduated cum laude from Washington State University in 1976, also the year of his racing debut. Hanauer worked as a teacher of emotionally disturbed children, but became a full-time hydroplane driver in 1978, first winning a race in 1979 in Ogden, Utah.

In 1982, Hanauer became the driver for Atlas Van Lines, replacing owner/driver Bill Muncey, who died in the final race of the 1981 season. Muncey asked his widow, Fran, to continue the race team if he died. Fran selected Hanauer, who was reportedly picked by Bill to replace him, to drive. Hanauer went on to win his first Unlimited National and World Championship. In 1985 he won his fourth consecutive Gold Cup and another National Championship.

In 1986, Hanauer tied Garfield Wood's record for the most consecutive Gold Cup wins. In 1987 he won his sixth consecutive Gold Cup, breaking Gar Wood's record. He won a seventh consecutive Gold Cup victory in 1988. In 1990 he again won the National Championship.

At the end of the 1990 season, Hanauer left hydroplane racing and tried his hand at auto racing, driving for Toyota, but joined Bernie Little's Miss Budweiser hydroplane racing team in 1992. The team owner of the Toyota-sponsored auto racing team for which Hanauer briefly drove in 1991 later commented that Hanauer would certainly have been successful in automobile racing had he pursued that career progression.

In the early 1990s, Hanauer suffered a series of severe injuries in high-speed unlimited hydroplane accidents. Those accidents eventually pushed him to make the decision to retire in 1996. He also developed a serious condition called spasmodic dysphonia which caused him to lose his voice – only to regain it several years later after learning of a treatment in which botox is injected directly into the throat. He continues to volunteer his time at a home for disadvantaged children in Seattle. He also volunteers as a transporter for Disabled American Veterans, picking up disabled veterans from their homes and driving them to appointments at the VA Medical Center in Seattle.

== Awards ==
Hanauer was inducted into the Motorsports Hall of Fame of America in 1995.

== Sources ==
- Britannica - Chip Hanauer
- Biography - Motorsports Hall of Fame
