= Pay 'n Pak =

American home improvement chain

- Company type: Home improvement retail
- Founded: 1962
- Founders: Stan Thurman
- Defunct: 2003
- Fate: Liquidation
- Headquarters: Kent, Washington
- Number of locations: 112 (1987)
- Areas served: Western United States
- Products: Lumber, tools, hardware, garden supplies, plants

Pay 'n Pak was a home improvement chain that was based out of Kent, Washington. Pay 'n Pak began in 1962 and was founded by Stan Thurman, an electric and plumbing supply retailer from Longview, Washington. In 1969, Pay 'n Pak merged with Eagle Electric & Plumbing, a company run by Thurman protégé David Heerensperger. Shortly thereafter, Stan Thurman was voted out and Heerensperger became the chairman of the company until 1989 when he left to form Eagle Hardware & Garden. At the time of a hostile corporate raid attempt in 1987, Pay 'n Pak had 112 stores in the Western United States.

The original flagship store in Kent was called Pay 'n Pak Mall. It featured a departmentalized hardware store broken up into separate stores (an electrical store, plumbing, and lumber). It also contained a coffee shop as well. By the 1980s a larger store was built next to the mall which carried the same format as the other stores had and the mall was sold.

After bankruptcy in 1991, Thurman Industries bought four Pay 'n Pak stores: those located in Butte, Montana, Billings, Montana, Moses Lake, Washington, and Wenatchee, Washington. They were operated as Thurman Pay 'N Pak home centers until March 2003 when Thurman Industries liquidated the stores and closed them down. Ernst took over the Kent store and the distribution center.

Pay 'n Pak was also a sponsor of an unlimited hydroplane racing team from the late 1960s to the early 1980s and won the points championship from 1973-1975. They also sponsored the first winning turbine powered hydroplane from 1980 to 1983. The boat crashed in 1980. It would be the last boat that would carry the Pay 'n Pak name.

== History ==
- 1962 Stan Thurman establishes Pay 'n Pak
- 1969 Pay 'n Pak merges with Eagle Electric & Plumbing and goes public
- 1969 Stan Thurman voted out and David Heerensperger voted in as chairman
- 1988 Pay 'n Pak goes private for $226 million after a corporate raid attempt
- 1989 David Heerensperger leaves as chairman
- 1991 Pay 'n Pak files for Chapter 11 bankruptcy
- 1992 Pay 'n Pak liquidates its remaining stores and four of the former Pay 'n Pak stores were bought by Thurman Industries and operated under the name Thurman Pay 'n Pak
- 2003 Thurman Industries liquidates and closes the remaining four Thurman Pay 'n Paks

== Sources ==
- Robert LaFranco. "Comeuppance?" Forbes, Dec 4, 1995 v156 n13 p74(3)
