= APBA Gold Cup =

Hydroplane boat race in the United States

Event information
- Type: H1 Unlimited hydroplane boat race
- Race area: rotating sites
- Dates: variable, in July or early August
- First race: 1904
- Website: H1 Unlimited Hydroplane Racing Series

The APBA Gold Cup (originally known simply as the Gold Cup, a speedboat race) is an American hydroplane boat race, named for the American Power Boat Association. It is now run as part of the H1 Unlimited season. First run in 1904, it is the oldest trophy in motorsports.

Starting in 1904, the Gold Cup consist of three heats, and starting in 1918 the heat distance was 30 statute miles. In 1963 the number of heats was increased to four, but the total distance was reduced to 60 statute miles. In 1976, the Unlimited Racing Commission adopted a winner-take-all format for all its races including the APBA Gold Cup. In 1981 the total number of heats was reduced to three with the total distance being reduced to 45 statute miles. Since 1983 the Gold Cup has been competed at various total distances ranging from 36 statute miles to 52.5 statute miles.

The drivers with the most Gold Cup victories are Chip Hanauer, and Dave Villwock with 11 victories. Bill Muncey is second with eight.

== List of Gold Cup winners ==
Year	Driver	Boat	Race Location
1904	Carl C. Riotte	Standard	New York
1904	Willis Sharpe Kilmer	Vingt et Un II	New York
1905	Jonathan Wainwright	Chip	Chippewa Bay, NY
1906	Jonathan Wainwright (2)	Chip II	Chippewa Bay, NY
1907	Jonathan Wainwright (3)	Chip II	Chippewa Bay, NY
1908	E.J. Schroeder	Dixie II	Chippewa Bay, NY
1909	E.J. Schroeder (2)	Dixie II	Alexandria Bay, NY
1910	Frederick K. Burnham	Dixie III	Alexandria Bay, NY
1911	J.H. Hayden	MIT II	Alexandria Bay, NY
1912	A. Graham Miles	P.D.Q. II	Alexandria Bay, NY
1913	Casimir S. Mankowski	Ankle Deep	Alexandria Bay, NY
1914	Robert Edgren & Jim Blackton, Jr	Baby Speeddemon II	Lake George, NY
1915	Jack Beebe and John "Freckles" Milot	Miss Detroit	New York
1916	Bernard Smith	Miss Minneapolis	Detroit, MI
1917	Gar Wood	Miss Detroit II	Detroit, MI
1918	Gar Wood (2)	Miss Detroit III	Detroit, MI
1919	Gar Wood (3)	Miss Detroit III	Detroit, MI
1920	Gar Wood (4)	Miss Detroit IV	Detroit, MI
1921	Gar Wood (5)	Miss America	Detroit, MI
1922	Jesse G. Vincent	Packard Chriscraft	Detroit, MI
1923	Caleb Bragg	Packard Chriscraft	Detroit, MI
1924	Caleb Bragg (2)	Baby Bootlegger	Detroit, MI
1925	Caleb Bragg (3)	Baby Bootlegger	Port Washington, NY
1926	George H. Townsend	Greenwich Folley	Port Washington, NY
1927	George H. Townsend (2)	Greenwich Folley	New York
1928	N/A	No Contest	N/A
1929	Richard. F. Hoyt	I M P II	Red Bank, NJ
1930	Victor William Kliesrath	Hotsy Totsy	Red Bank, NJ
1931	Victor William Kliesrath (2)	Hotsy Totsy	Montauk, NY
1932	Bill Horn	Delphine IV	Montauk, NY
1933	George Reis	El Lagarto	Detroit, MI
1934	George Reis (2)	El Lagarto	Lake George, NY
1935	George Reis (3)	El Lagarto	Lake George, NY
1936	Kaye Don	Impshi	Lake George, NY
1937	Clell Perry	Notre Dame	Detroit, MI
1938	Theo Rossi	Alagi	Detroit, MI
1939	Zalmon Guy Simmons, Jr.	G-13 My Sin	Detroit, MI
1940	Sidney Allen	G-4 Hotsy Totsy III	Northport, NY
1941	Zalmon Guy Simmons, Jr. (2)	G-13 My Sin	Red Bank, NJ
1942	N/A	No Contests- World War II	N/A
1943	N/A	No Contests- World War II	N/A
1944	N/A	No Contests- World War II	N/A
1945	N/A	No Contests- World War II	N/A
1946	Guy Lombardo	G-13 Tempo VI	Detroit, MI
1947	Danny Foster	G-99 Miss Peps V	Jamaica Bay, NY
1948	Danny Foster (2)	G-4 Miss Great Lakes	Detroit, MI
1949	Bill Cantrell	U-3 My Sweetie	Detroit, MI
1950	Ted Jones	U-27 Slo-Mo-Shun IV	Detroit, MI
1951	Lou Fageol	U-37 Slo-Mo Shun V	Seattle, WA
1952	Stan Dollar	U-27 Slo-Mo-Shun IV	Seattle, WA
1953	Joe Taggart	U-27 Slo-Mo-Shun IV	Seattle, WA
1954	Lou Fageol (2)	U-37 Slo-Mo-Shun V	Seattle, WA
1955	Lee Schoenith	U-55 Gale V	Seattle, WA
1956	Bill Muncey	U-60 Miss Thriftway	Detroit, MI
1957	Bill Muncey (2)	U-60 Miss Thriftway	Seattle, WA
1958	Jack Regas	U-8 Hawaii Kai III	Seattle, WA
1959	Bill Stead	U-00 Maverick	Seattle, WA
1960	N/A (Note 1)	No Contest- High Winds	Las Vegas, NV
1961	Bill Muncey (3)	U-60 Miss Century 21 Thriftway Stores	Reno, NV
1962	Bill Muncey (4)	U-60 Miss Century 21 Thriftway Stores	Seattle, WA
1963	Ron Musson	U-40 Miss Bardahl	Detroit, MI
1964	Ron Musson (2)	U-40 Miss Bardahl	Detroit, MI
1965	Ron Musson (3)	U-40 Miss Bardahl	Seattle, WA
1966	Miro Slovak	U-3 Tahoe Miss	Detroit, MI
1967	Bill Schumacher	U-40 Miss Bardahl	Seattle, WA
1968	Bill Schumacher (2)	U-1 Miss Bardahl	Detroit, MI
1969	Bill Sterret	U-12 Miss Budweiser	San Diego, CA
1970	Dean Chenoweth	U-12 Miss Budweiser	San Diego, CA
1971	Jim McCormick	U-6 Miss Madison	Madison, IN
1972	Bill Muncey (5)	U-71 Atlas Van Lines	Detroit, MI
1973	Dean Chenoweth (2)	U-12 Miss Budweiser	Tri-Cities, WA
1974	George Henley	U-1 Pay'n Pak	Seattle, WA
1975	George Henley (2)	U-1 Pay'n Pak	Tri-Cities, WA
1976	Tom D'Eath	U-2 Miss U.S.	Detroit, MI
1977	Bill Muncey (6)	U-1 Atlas Van Lines	Tri-Cities, WA
1978	Bill Muncey (7)	U-00 Atlas Van Lines	Owensboro, KY
1979	Bill Muncey (8)	U-1 Atlas Van Lines	Madison, IN
1980	Dean Chenoweth (3)	U-12 Miss Budweiser	Madison, IN
1981	Dean Chenoweth (4)	U-1 Miss Budweiser	Seattle, WA
1982	Chip Hanauer	U-00 Atlas Van Lines	Detroit, MI
1983	Chip Hanauer (2)	U-1 Atlas Van Lines	Evansville, IN
1984	Chip Hanauer (3)	U-1 Atlas Van Lines	Tri-Cities, WA
1985	Chip Hanauer (4)	U-00 Miller American	Seattle, WA
1986	Chip Hanauer (5)	U-1 Miller American	Detroit, MI
1987	Chip Hanauer (6)	U-00 Miller American	San Diego, CA
1988	Chip Hanauer (7)	U-00 Circus Circus	Evansville, IN
1989	Tom D'Eath (2)	U-1 Miss Budweiser	San Diego, CA
1990	Tom D'Eath (3)	U-1 Miss Budweiser	Detroit, MI
1991	Mark Tate	U-10 Winston Eagle	Detroit, MI
1992	Chip Hanauer (8)	U-1 Miss Budweiser	Detroit, MI
1993	Chip Hanauer (9)	U-1 Miss Budweiser	Detroit, MI
1994	Mark Tate (2)	U-10 Smokin' Joe's	Detroit, MI
1995	Chip Hanauer (10)	U-1 Miss Budweiser	Detroit, MI
1996	Dave Villwock	U-100 Pico American Dream	Detroit, MI
1997	Dave Villwock (2)	U-12 Miss Budweiser	Detroit, MI
1998	Dave Villwock (3)	U-1 Miss Budweiser	Detroit, MI
1999	Chip Hanauer (11)	U-100 Miss Pico	Detroit, MI
2000	Dave Villwock (4)	U-1 Miss Budweiser	Detroit, MI
2001	Michael Hanson	U-9 Jones Racing (Tubby's Subs)	Detroit, MI
2002	Dave Villwock (5)	U-1 Miss Budweiser	Detroit, MI
2003	Mitch Evans	U-3 Miss Fox Hills	Detroit, MI
2004	Nate Brown	U-10 Miss DYC	Detroit, MI
2005	Terry Troxell	U-13 Miss Al Deeby Dodge	Detroit, MI
2006	Jean Theoret	U-37 Miss Beacon Plumbing	Detroit, MI
2007	Dave Villwock (6)	U-16 Miss E-Lam Plus	Detroit, MI
2008	N/A (Note 2)	No Contest- High Winds	Detroit, MI
2009	Dave Villwock (7)	U-16 Miss E-Lam Plus	Detroit, MI
2010	Dave Villwock (8)	U-96 Spirit of Qatar	Detroit, MI
2011	Dave Villwock (9)	U-96 Spirit of Qatar	Detroit, MI
2012	Dave Villwock (10)	U-1 Spirit of Qatar 96	Detroit, MI
2013	Kip Brown	U-95 Spirit of Qatar	Detroit, MI
2014	Jimmy Shane	U-6 Oberto Beef Jerky	Detroit, MI
2015	Jimmy Shane (2)	U-1 Oberto Beef Jerky	Tri-Cities, WA
2016	J. Michael Kelly	U-5 Graham Trucking	Detroit, MI
2017	Jimmy Shane (3)	U-1 Miss Homestreet Bank	Detroit, MI
2018	Andrew Tate	U-9 Delta/Realtrac	Detroit, MI
2019	Jimmy Shane (4)	U-6 Miss Homestreet Bank	Madison, IN
2020	N/A	No season (pandemic)	Madison, IN
2021	Jimmy Shane (5)	U-1 Goodman Real Estate Presents Miss Homestreet	Madison, IN
2022	Corey Peabody	U-9 Lynx Healthcare	Guntersville, AL
2023	J. Michael Kelly (2)	U-8 Beacon Electric	Seattle, WA
2024	Corey Peabody (2)	U-9 Beacon Plumbing	San Diego, CA
2025	Dave Villwock (11)	U-27 Miss Apollo	Tri-Cities, WA
2026	Jimmy Shane (6)	U-27 Miss Apollo	Madison, IN

Notes:

1960: Heat 1A completed. Second half of first heat was abandoned when Gale V crashed in Heat 1B. By rule, two heats were required to be completed for an official meeting for series championship purposes. Round abandoned and cancelled by APBA because of high winds.

2008: Heats 1A, 1B, 2A, and 2B completed. Round abandoned after crash in Heat 3A and high winds, declared No Contest by APBA. American Boat Racing Association (now H1 Unlimited) declared the round official, counting all heat races and qualifying results for series championship purposes since nine boats started the first heat race. With two fully completed heats, U-5 FormulaBoats.com (Jeff Bernard, driver) declared round winner with 850 points (fifth in qualifying, first in heat 1B, and first in heat 2B) for National Boat Championship purposes.
