= H1 Unlimited =

Hydroplane racing league

- Category: Unlimited hydroplane racing
- Country: United States
- Inaugural season: 1946
- Drivers: 9
- Teams: 9
- Engine suppliers: Lycoming Engines
- Drivers' champion: (United States) Andrew Tate
- Teams' champion: (United States) BWR Racing
- Official website: www.h1unlimited.com

H1 Unlimited is an American unlimited hydroplane racing league that is sanctioned by the American Power Boat Association (APBA). The series was known as the American Boat Racing Association (ABRA) from 2005 until 2009. The H1 Unlimited season typically runs from July through September, consisting of five races.

A hydroplane (or hydro, or thunderboat) is a type of motorboat used exclusively for racing. A unique characteristic of hydroplanes is that they only use the water they are on for propulsion and steering and not for flotation—when going at full speed they are primarily held aloft by a principle of fluid dynamics known as "planing," with only a fraction of their hull touching the water.

== History ==
The unlimited hydroplane racing series was founded in 1946 when the unlimited class of boats was allowed to compete following World War II and the subsequent availability of surplus aircraft engines. It had been disbanded in 1922 in favor of the newly introduced "Gold Cup Class."

The world's first sanctioned unlimited hydroplane race was held 123 years ago in 1903 in Ireland at Queenstown, and was very modest by later race standards. That race was won by Dorothy Levitt, driving an 11-meter (35 ft) boat, powered by a 56-kilowatt (75 hp) Napier engine, at an average speed of 31.4 km/h (19.5 mph).

The boats were initially restricted to engines of a maximum of 10.24 liters (625 cu in), later increased to 12.00 liters (732 cu in). Hulls with "steps" or "shingles" on the underside were prohibited.

One reason for the rule change was to end the domination of its star driver, Gar Wood, who had won five consecutive APBA Gold Cups from 1917-1921. One win in 1920 in his twin Liberty L-12 powered Miss America, averaged 113.317 km/h (70.412 mph) in the 48 km (30 mi) race over an 8 km (5 mi) course and set a race record that stood until 1946. "King Gar" had entered fifteen Gold Cup heats during those pinnacle years. He finished first twelve times and second three times. Throughout the years, only two boats showed up to challenge Miss America; one of those was piloted by George Wood, Gar's younger brother, in Miss Chicago. Another reason for the rule change was to make racing more affordable.

In 1929, the 725 cu in (11.88 L) Class was introduced by the Mississippi Valley Power Boat Association (MVPBA). The majority of these boats were powered by Hispano-Suiza 8 aircraft engines or Curtiss OX-5s. These boats were popular in the Southern and Midwestern US, but did not attract the media attention that the expensive and exotic-looking Gold Cup Class counterparts had.

In 1946 after the hiatus due to the war, the MVPBA was absorbed into the APBA, and as a result the 725s and the Gold Cups merged to become the APBA Unlimited Class.

Following the protest-ridden 1956 APBA Gold Cup at Detroit, which took 85 days to settle, the Unlimited Class severed all but nominal ties with the APBA. In 1957, the Unlimited Racing Commission (URC) was formed. In the 1990s, the URC was renamed the Unlimited Hydroplane Racing Association (UHRA). In 2001, HYDRO-PROP, Inc., bought the licensing rights to the Unlimited Class from the APBA and managed the unlimited class through the 2004 racing season. The American Boat Racing Association (ABRA) was formed in 2005 and was renamed H1 Unlimited in 2009.

The turbine engine was first used in competition by the U-95 "Whiz-per" in 1974, which sank that August at Seattle. The next entrant with turbine power was the Pay 'n Pak in 1980 on the Columbia River at Tri-Cities, but it suffered a blow-over crash in a test run prior to the Sunday heats. It was the sole turbine again the following year, but through the 1980s, the turbine gradually displaced piston power.

Over the years, the number of major historic teams have disappeared. Miss Budweiser was discontinued after the 2004 season, following the team's 24th National High Points Championship.

== Today ==
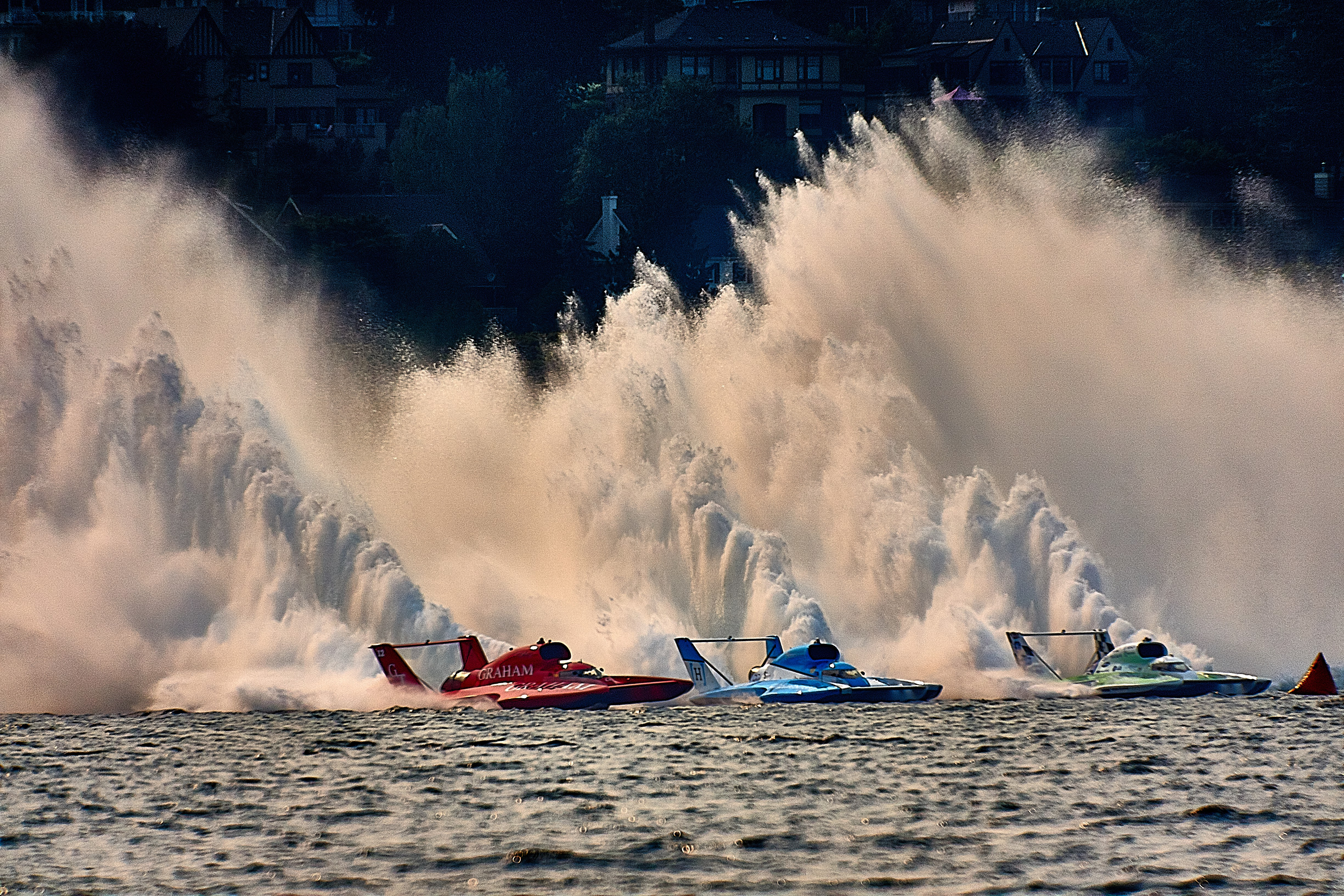
First turn of the Final Heat at Seafair in Seattle, Washington.

The H1 Unlimited class is sanctioned by APBA, its governing body in North America and UIM, its international body.

Unlimited Hydroplanes are fast boats capable of more than 320 km/h (200 mph) on the straights and running average lap speeds of 209–266 km/h (130–165 mph). They are 8.5–9.1 m (28–30 ft) in length and weigh a minimum of 2,982 kg (6,575 lb).

The modern turbine-powered unlimited hydroplane is derived from the 3-point prop-riding hydroplanes of the 1950s. These were the first boats to ride on a cushion of air trapped between "sponsons" mounted on the sides of the front of the boat, and the bottom half of the propeller, which were all that touched the water.

They were called "Unlimited" because they were the only class of boat racing in the APBA that had no restrictions on the displacement size of their piston engines. The designation Unlimited has stayed with the class in the turbine era, even though there are restrictions on the turbine engine and its fuel.

Almost all the H1 Unlimited hydroplanes are powered by Lycoming T55 turbine engines, originally used in Chinook helicopters. The U-440 of the Bucket List Racing team runs a T-53 turbine. The U-3 Go3 Racing team was the last piston powered boat in the fleet, powered by a twin turbocharged Allison V-12 until 2023.

== Past National High Point Champions ==
Since 1946, the National High Point Championships are awarded to the team and to the driver with the most points at the end of the season. The Martini & Rossi National Champion Perpetual Trophy was first awarded in 1959, and the Bill Muncey Trophy was first awarded in 2007.

Martini & Rossi National Champion Perpetual Trophy for Season High Point Team
Year	Team	Engine	Owner	Wins
1946	G-13 Tempo VI	16-cylinder Miller engine	Guy Lombardo	1
1947	Miss Peps V		Walt Dossin; Roy Dossin; Russell Dossin	3
1948	Such Crust		Jack Schafer, Sr.	2
1949	My Sweetie		Ed Gregory; Ed Schoenherr; Horace Dodge, Jr.	4
1950	My Sweetie		Horace Dodge, Jr.	2
1951	Miss Pepsi		Walt Dossin; Roy Dossin	4
1952	Miss Pepsi		Walt Dossin; Roy Dossin	3
1953	Gale II		Joe Schoenith	1
1954	Gale V		Joe Schoenith	4
1955	Gale V		Joe Schoenith	1
1956	Shanty I		Bill Waggoner	3
1957	Hawaii Kai III		Edgar Kaiser	5
1958	Miss Bardahl		Ole Bardahl	3
1959	Maverick		Bill Waggoner	5
1960	Miss Thriftway		Willard Rhodes	4
1961	Miss Century 21		Willard Rhodes	4
1962	Miss Century 21		Willard Rhodes	5
1963	Miss Bardahl		Ole Bardahl	3
1964	Miss Bardahl		Ole Bardahl	4
1965	Miss Bardahl		Ole Bardahl	4
1966	Tahoe Miss		Bill Harrah	4
1967	Miss Bardahl		Ole Bardahl	6
1968	Miss Bardahl		Ole Bardahl	4
1969	Miss Budweiser	Rolls-Royce Merlin	Bernie Little; Tom Friedkin	4
1970	Miss Budweiser	Rolls-Royce Merlin	Bernie Little; Tom Friedkin	4
1971	Miss Budweiser	Rolls-Royce Merlin	Bernie Little; Tom Friedkin	2
1972	Atlas Van Lines		Joe Schoenith	6
1973	Pay 'n Pak	Rolls-Royce Merlin	Dave Heerensperger	4
1974	Pay 'n Pak	Rolls-Royce Merlin	Dave Heerensperger	7
1975	Pay 'n Pak	Rolls-Royce Merlin	Dave Heerensperger	5
1976	Atlas Van Lines	Rolls-Royce Merlin	Bill Muncey	5
1977	Miss Budweiser	Rolls-Royce Merlin	Bernie Little	3
1978	Atlas Van Lines	Rolls-Royce Merlin	Bill Muncey	6
1979	Atlas Van Lines	Rolls-Royce Merlin	Bill Muncey	7
1980	Miss Budweiser	Rolls-Royce Griffon	Bernie Little	5
1981	Miss Budweiser	Rolls-Royce Griffon	Bernie Little	6
1982	Atlas Van Lines	Rolls-Royce Merlin	Fran Muncey	5
1983	Atlas Van Lines	Rolls-Royce Merlin	Fran Muncey; Jim Lucero	3
1984	Miss Budweiser	Rolls-Royce Griffon	Bernie Little	6
1985	Miller American	Lycoming T55	Fran Muncey; Jim Lucero	5
1986	Miss Budweiser	Lycoming T55	Bernie Little	3
1987	Miss Budweiser	Lycoming T55	Bernie Little	5
1988	Miss Budweiser	Lycoming T55	Bernie Little	4
1989	Miss Budweiser	Lycoming T55	Bernie Little	4
1990	Miss Circus Circus	Lycoming T55	Bill Bennett	6
1991	Miss Budweiser	Lycoming T55	Bernie Little	4
1992	Miss Budweiser	Lycoming T55	Bernie Little	7
1993	Miss Budweiser	Lycoming T55	Bernie Little	7
1994	Miss Budweiser	Lycoming T55	Bernie Little	4
1995	Miss Budweiser	Lycoming T55	Bernie Little	5
1996	PICO American Dream	Lycoming T55	Fred Leland	6
1997	Miss Budweiser	Lycoming T55	Bernie Little	6
1998	Miss Budweiser	Lycoming T55	Bernie Little	8
1999	Miss Budweiser	Lycoming T55	Bernie Little	8
2000	Miss Budweiser	Lycoming T55	Bernie Little	6
2001	Miss Budweiser	Lycoming T55-L7C	Bernie Little	1
2002	Miss Budweiser	Lycoming T55-L7C	Bernie Little	3
2003	Miss Budweiser	Lycoming T55-L7C	Joe Little	2
2004	Miss Budweiser	Lycoming T55-L7C	Joe Little	5
2005	Miss Elam Plus	Lycoming T55-L7C	Erick Ellstrom	3
2006	Miss Formulaboats.com II	Lycoming T55-L7C	Ted Porter	1
2007	Miss Elam Plus	Lycoming T55-L7C	Erick Ellstrom	4
2008	Oh Boy! Oberto (Miss Madison)	Lycoming T55-L7C	City of Madison	1
2009	Oh Boy! Oberto (Miss Madison)	Lycoming T55-L7C	City of Madison	1
2010	Oh Boy! Oberto (Miss Madison)	Lycoming T55-L7C	City of Madison	3
2011	Spirit of Qatar	Lycoming T55-L7C	Marine Technologies	3
2012	Oh Boy! Oberto (Miss Madison)	Lycoming T55-L7C	City of Madison	2
2013	Graham Trucking	Lycoming T55-L7C	Team Porter Racing	4
2014	Oberto Beef Jerky	Lycoming T55-L7C	City of Madison	2
2015	Oberto	Lycoming T55-L7C	City of Madison	3
2016	HomeStreet Bank	Lycoming T55-L7C	City of Madison	3
2017	HomeStreet Bank	Lycoming T55-L7C	City of Madison	3
2018	Jones Racing	Lycoming T55-L7C	Michael and Lori Jones	5
2019	HomeStreet Bank	Lycoming T55-L7C	City of Madison	2
2021	HomeStreet Bank	Lycoming T55-L7C	City of Madison	1
2022	HomeStreet Bank	Lycoming T55-L7C	City of Madison	5
2023	Beacon Electric	Lycoming T55-L7C	Strong Racing	2
2024	Goodman Real Estate	Lycoming T55-L7C	City of Madison	2
2025	Goodman Real Estate	Lycoming T55-L7C	BWR Racing	2
2026	BWR Racing	Lycoming T55-L7C	BWR Racing	2

Bill Muncey Trophy for the Season High Point Champion Driver
Year	Driver	Machine	Wins
1946	Guy Lombardo	Tempo VI	1
1947	Danny Foster	Miss Peps V	3
1948	Dan Arena	Such Crust	2
1949	Bill Stead	My Sweetie	4
1950	Danny Foster	Such Crust; Delphine X	2
1951	Chuck Thompson	Miss Pepsi	4
1952	Chuck Thompson	Miss Pepsi	3
1953	Lee Schoenith	Gale II	1
1954	Lee Schoenith	Gale V	4
1955	Lee Schoenith	Gale V	1
1956	Russ Schleeh	Shanty I	3
1957	Jack Regas	Hawaii Kai III	5
1958	Mira Slovak	Miss Bardahl	3
1959	Bill Stead	Maverick	5
1960	Bill Muncey	Miss Thriftway	4
1961	Bill Muncey	Miss Century 21	4
1962	Bill Muncey	Miss Century 21	5
1963	Bill Cantrell	Gale V	0
1964	Ron Musson	Miss Bardahl	4
1965	Ron Musson	Miss Bardahl	4
1966	Mira Slovak	Tahoe Miss	4
1967	Billy Schumacher	Miss Bardahl	6
1968	Billy Schumacher	Miss Bardahl	4
1969	Bill Sterett, Sr.	Miss Budweiser	4
1970	Dean Chenoweth	Miss Budweiser	4
1971	Dean Chenoweth	Miss Budweiser	2
1972	Bill Muncey	Atlas Van Lines	6
1973	Mickey Remund	Pay 'n Pak	4
1974	George Henley	Pay 'n Pak	7
1975	Billy Schumacher	Weisfield's	2
1977	Mickey Remund	Miss Budweiser	3
1976	Bill Muncey	Atlas Van Lines	5
1978	Bill Muncey	Atlas Van Lines	6
1979	Bill Muncey	Atlas Van Lines	7
1980	Dean Chenoweth	Miss Budweiser	5
1981	Dean Chenoweth	Miss Budweiser	6
1982	Chip Hanauer	Atlas Van Lines	5
1983	Chip Hanauer	Atlas Van Lines	3
1984	Jim Kropfeld	Miss Budweiser	6
1985	Chip Hanauer	Miller American	5
1986	Jim Kropfeld	Miss Budweiser	3
1987	Jim Kropfeld	Miss Budweiser	5
1988	Tom D'Eath	Miss Budweiser	4
1989	Chip Hanauer	Miss Circus Circus	3
1990	Chip Hanauer	Miss Circus Circus	6
1991	Mark Tate	Winston Eagle; Oh Boy! Oberto	3
1992	Chip Hanauer	Miss Budweiser	7
1993	Chip Hanauer	Miss Budweiser	7
1994	Mark Tate	Smokin' Joe's	2
1995	Mark Tate	Smokin' Joe's	4
1996	Dave Villwock	PICO American Dream	6
1997	Mark Tate	Close Call	1
1998	Dave Villwock	Miss Budweiser	8
1999	Dave Villwock	Miss Budweiser	8
2000	Dave Villwock	Miss Budweiser	6
2001	Dave Villwock	Miss Budweiser	1
2002	Dave Villwock	Miss Budweiser	3
2003	Dave Villwock	Miss Budweiser	2
2004	Dave Villwock	Miss Budweiser	5
2005	Steve David	Oh Boy! Oberto (Miss Madison)	1
2006	Steve David	Oh Boy! Oberto (Miss Madison)	0
2007	Dave Villwock	Miss Elam Plus	4
2008	Steve David	Oh Boy! Oberto (Miss Madison)	1
2009	Steve David	Oh Boy! Oberto (Miss Madison)	1
2010	Steve David	Oh Boy! Oberto (Miss Madison)	3
2011	Dave Villwock	Spirit of Qatar	3
2012	Steve David	Oh Boy! Oberto (Miss Madison)	2
2013	Jimmy Shane	Graham Trucking	4
2014	Jimmy Shane	Oh Boy! Oberto (Miss Madison)	2
2015	Jimmy Shane	Oberto	3
2016	Jimmy Shane	HomeStreet Bank	3
2017	Jimmy Shane	HomeStreet Bank	2
2018	Andrew Tate	Jones Racing	5
2019	Jimmy Shane	HomeStreet Bank	2
2021	J. Michael Kelly	Miss Tri-Cities	2
2022	Jimmy Shane	HomeStreet Bank	5
2023	J. Michael Kelly	Beacon Electric	2
2024	Andrew Tate	Goodman Real Estate	2
2025	Andrew Tate	Goodman Real Estate	2
2026	Andrew Tate	BWR Racing	2

== Standing All-Time Competition and Qualifying Speed Records ==
Record	Speed	Driver	Boat	Location	Year
Qualifying	173.384 mph	Dave Villwock	Miss Budweiser	San Diego, CA	1999
Competition Lap	166.221 mph	Steve David	Miss T-Plus	Pearl Harbor, HI	1992
Heat Avg	162.910 mph	Corey Peabody	Beacon Plumbing	Guntersville, AL	2023
Race Avg	157.574 mph	Andrew Tate	BWR Racing	San Diego, CA	2026
