= Miss Budweiser =

Racing boats

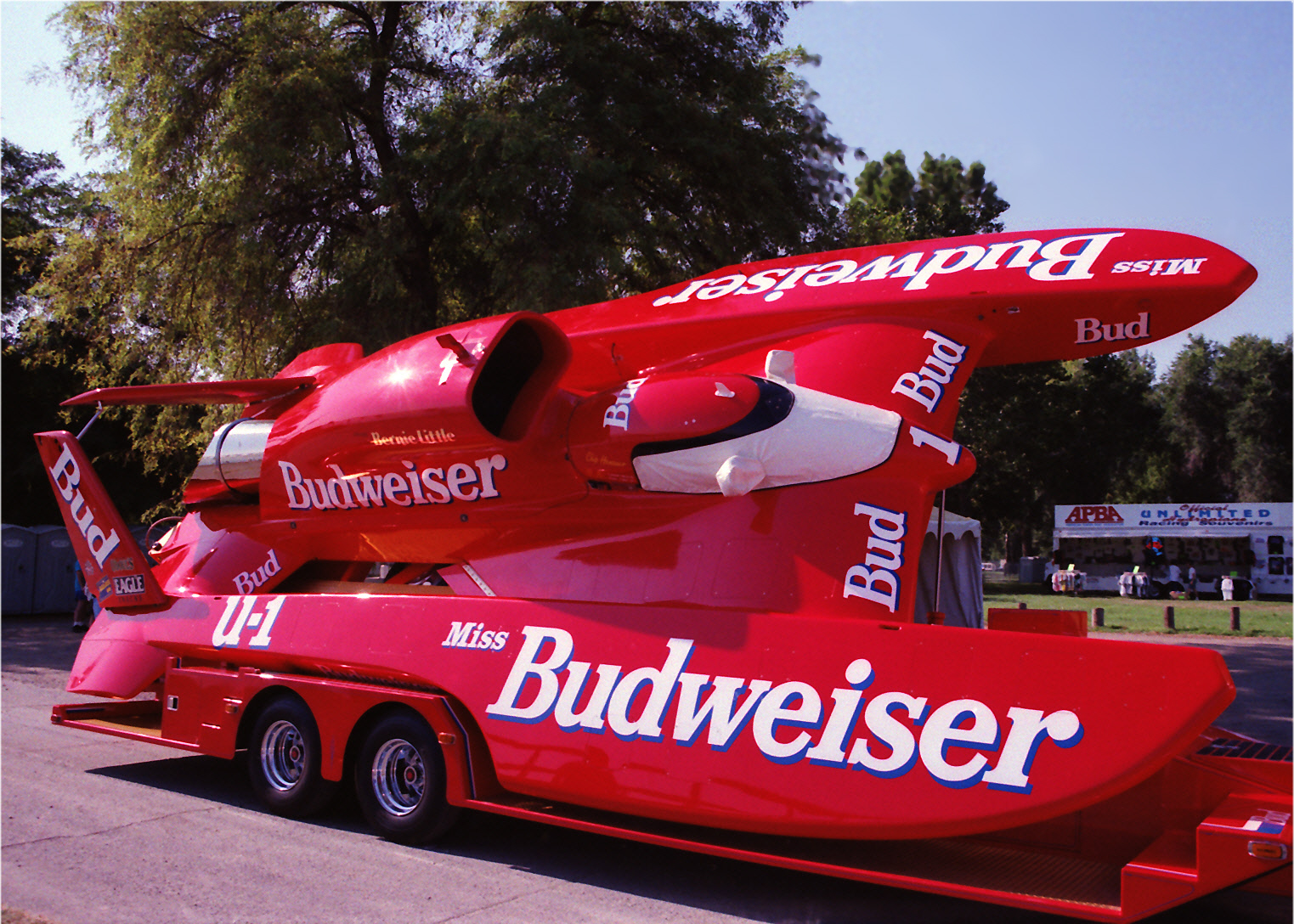
Miss Budweiser hydroplane

The Miss Budweiser were 22 hydroplanes sponsored by Budweiser beer that raced in the unlimited class under the U-12 banner. They were owned (some were leased backups) by Bernie Little. Anheuser-Busch sponsorship began in 1963, thanks to the friendship of Little and A-B president August Busch III.

After Little's death in April 2003, his youngest son Joe ran the operation for the two final seasons. Following the 2004 season, changes in Anheuser-Busch leadership resulted in the end of their 42 successful years of sponsorship in which the boat(s), drivers and crews accrued over 130 wins.

== Notable drivers ==
- Bob Schroeder 1963
- Chuck Hickling 1964–1965
- Bill Brow 1966–1967; 1 win
- Mike Thomas 1967; 1 win
- Bill Sterett 1968–1969; 5 wins
- Dean Chenoweth 1970–1972, 1973, 1979–1982; 23 wins
- Terry Sterett 1972
- Howie Benns 1974; 3 wins
- Mickey Remund 1975–1977; 6 wins
- Ron Snyder 1978; 1 win
- Jim Kropfeld 1983–1989; 22 wins
- Tom D'Eath 1988–1991; 13 wins
- Scott Pierce 1991; 3 wins
- Chip Hanauer 1992–1996; 22 wins
- Mike Hanson 1994; 1 win
- N. Mark Evans 1995–1996; 2 wins
- Mark Weber 1997; 1 win
- Dave Villwock 1997–2004; 30 wins
