= Dave Villwock =

American hydroplane racer

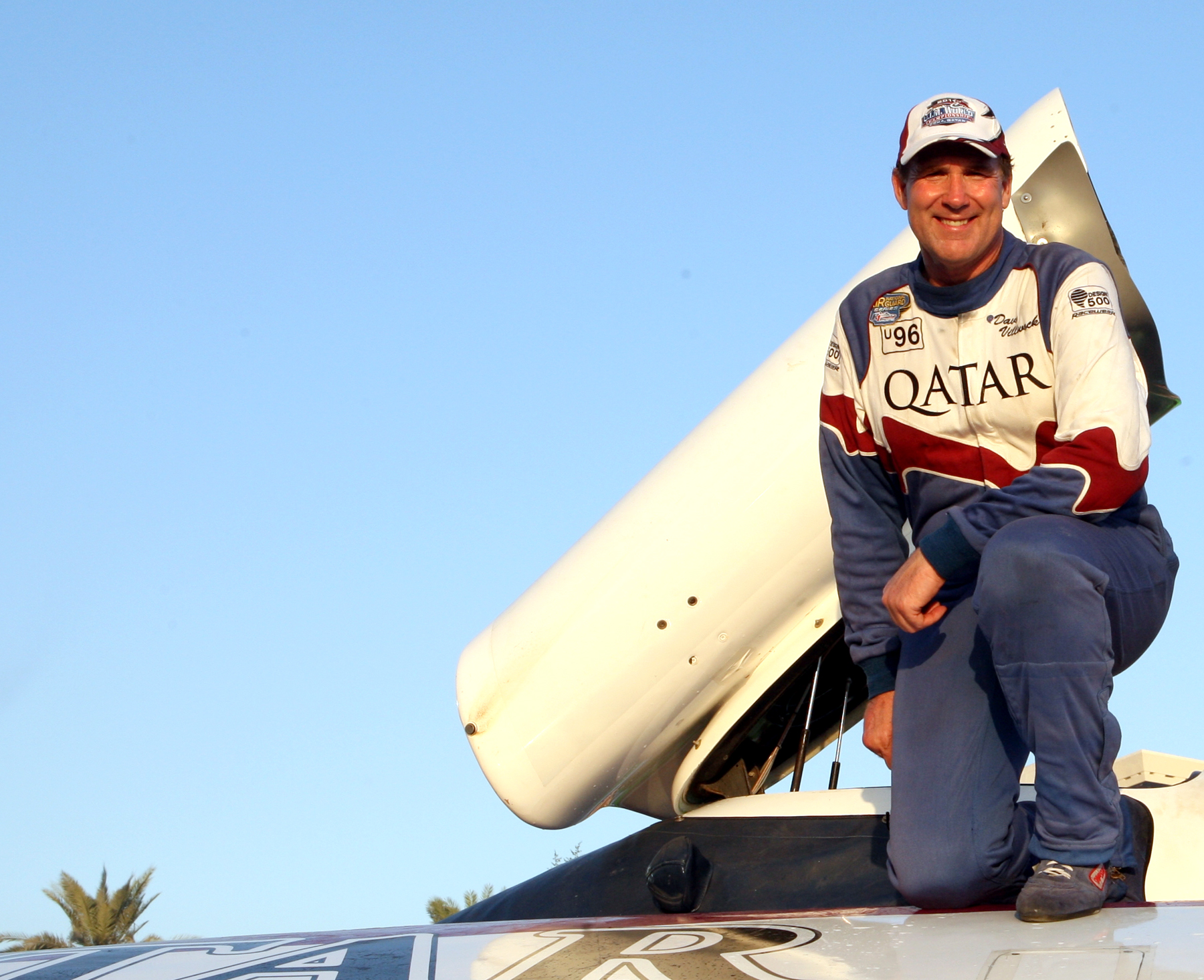
Dave Villwock

Dave Villwock (born February 10, 1954) is a hydroplane driver, known best for racing Unlimited Hydroplanes.

Villwock has the most victories in unlimited hydroplane history for a driver with 67.(As of July 27, 2025: 68.)

Villwock won ten National High Point Championships as a driver. Eight of those championships came while piloting Miss Budweiser. Villwock also won ten American Power Boat Association Gold Cup championships in his career.(As of July 27, 2025: eleven.)

On April 10, 2021, it was announced that Villwock would come out of retirement to drive for Sharon and Kelly Stocklin's Bucket List Racing team for the 2021 season.

On July 27, 2025, Villwock, at age 71, drove the U-27 Miss Apollo to Gold Cup victory in Tri-Cities, Washington.

Boats Driven By Villwock in his career
Boat Number	Boat name	Boat Owner	Years Driven
U-102.5	Coors Dry	Ron Jones, Jr.	1992
U-31	Miss Circus Circus	Bill Bennett	1993
U-100	PICO American Dream	Fred Leland	1994-1996
U-12	Miss Budweiser	Bernie Little	1997-2004
U-16	Miss ELAM Plus	Erick Ellstrom	2005-2009
U-96	Spirit of Qatar	Erick Ellstrom	2010-2012
U-37	Miss Beacon Plumbing	Billy and Jane Schumacher	2014
U-40	Miss Beacon Plumbing	Sharon and Kelly Stocklin	2021–2022
U-27	Miss Apollo	Charley Wiggins	2024-2025
