= American Power Boat Association =

Motorboat racing association in the U.S.

Logo of APBA

The American Power Boat Association (APBA) is an American membership-owned corporation. In 1903, New York's Columbia Yacht Club had formulated a constitution for what ultimately became the APBA. It is the United States sanctioning authority for the Union Internationale Motonautique, the world governing body for powerboat racing. Headquartered in Eastpointe Michigan, the APBA has over 3,500 active members and sanctions over 150 races nationwide. The APBA sanctions all types of power boat racing from 205+ mph Unlimited Hydroplanes to smaller Junior Class racing starting at age 9.

The APBA additionally works with H1 Unlimited in the area of Unlimited Hydroplane Racing.

== Hall of Champions ==
Each year, the association inducts powerboat drivers into its "Hall of Champions".

- 2009 induction
- 2010 induction
- 2021 induction
- 2022 induction
- 2023 induction
- 2025 induction
