= Sadler-Meyer Special =

- Category: Sports car
- Constructor: Sadler Car Company
- Designer(s): Bill Sadler
- Production: 1958-1959

Technical specifications
- Chassis: Tubular steel space frame, fiberglass body
- Suspension (front): Double wishbones
- Suspension (rear): De Dion axle
- Engine: Chevrolet small-block 339 cu in (5.6 L) 90° V8 NA Front-engine, longitudinally mounted
- Torque: 372 lb⋅ft (504 N⋅m)
- Transmission: BorgWarner T10 4 forward, plus reverse manual Halibrand quick-change differential
- Power: 425 hp (317 kW)
- Brakes: Solid rotor disc brakes; Inboard drum brakes

Competition history

The Sadler-Meyer Special is a custom-built American sports racing car, designed, developed, and built by Canadian mechanic, designer, engineer, and race car driver, Bill Sadler, in 1958. Only one was built.

== History and background ==
John van Meyer owned a cycle-fendered Special built for prewar road racing that he campaigned in early SCCA road races and hillclimbs. The car started with a Ford Flathead V8, which was first replaced by a Cadillac engine, and later with a Pontiac V8.

In 1958 Meyer approached Sadler to have him update the car and return it to competitive form. Sadler carried over the Pontiac V8, Borrani wire wheels and De Dion tube rear suspension from Meyer's old roadster, but fabricated a new ladder chassis and added an enveloping body. The car was completed in 1959.

The Sadler-Meyer carried Meyer to his second New York State Hillclimb Championship in 1959, and set fastest time-of-day at the Giants Despair Hillclimb in 1960, 1961 and 1962. Meyer eventually sold the Sadler-Meyer and moved on to other cars.

The Sadler-Meyer has been restored twice; once in the 1980s by owner Robert Fernando, after which it appeared in historic racing events, and again in 2008, this time with input from Sadler. Over the years the car's body was revised, with changes that include enclosed side pipes, Plexiglas side curtains, a recontoured radiator opening and extended nose, and a clear cover over the engine intake that replaced the original prominent scoop.

In its current state the car is powered by what started out as a 283 cu in (4.6 L) small-block Chevrolet V8 stroked out to 339 cu in (5.6 L). The intake is an Offenhauser manifold and six Stromberg 97 carburetors. Engine output was measured to be 425 hp (316.9 kW) at 6500 rpm. Other features include a BorgWarner T10 4-speed transmission, Halibrand quick change differential, solid rotor front disc brakes, inboard rear drums, and Halibrand centerlock wheels.

The car was raced in the 2009 Colorado Grand and then shown at the Greenwich Concours d’Elegance.
