= Hochsimmer =

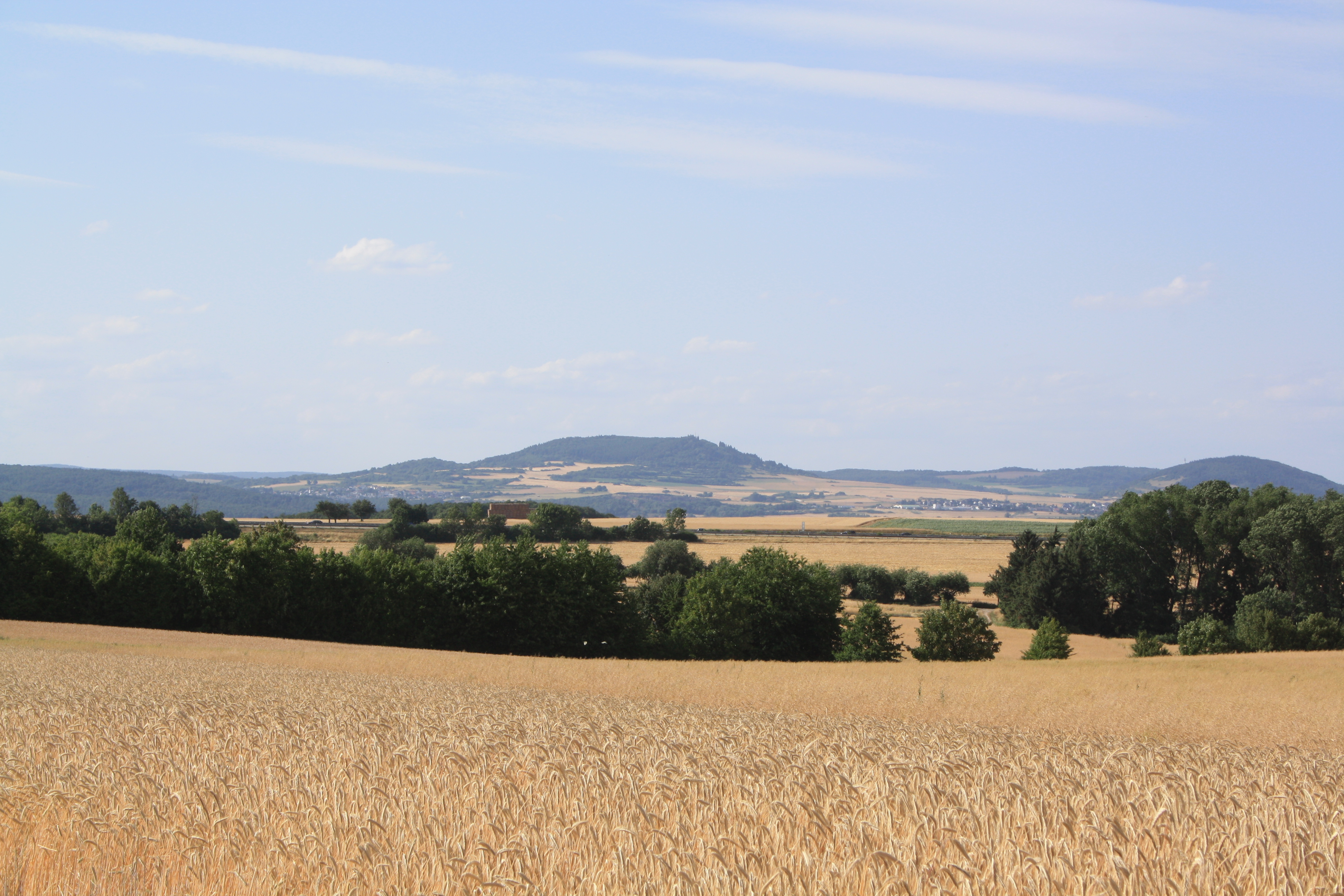
- The Hochsimmer with Sankt Johann (left) and Ettringen (right)

Highest point
- Elevation: 587.9 m above sea level (NHN) (1,929 ft)
- Coordinates: 50°21′38″N 7°11′55″E

Geography
- Location within Rhineland-Palatinate
- Location: near Ettringen; Mayen-Koblenz, Rhineland-Palatinate, Germany
- Parent range: Eifel (Eastern High Eifel)

Geology
- Mountain type: Cinder cone
- Rock type: Basalt

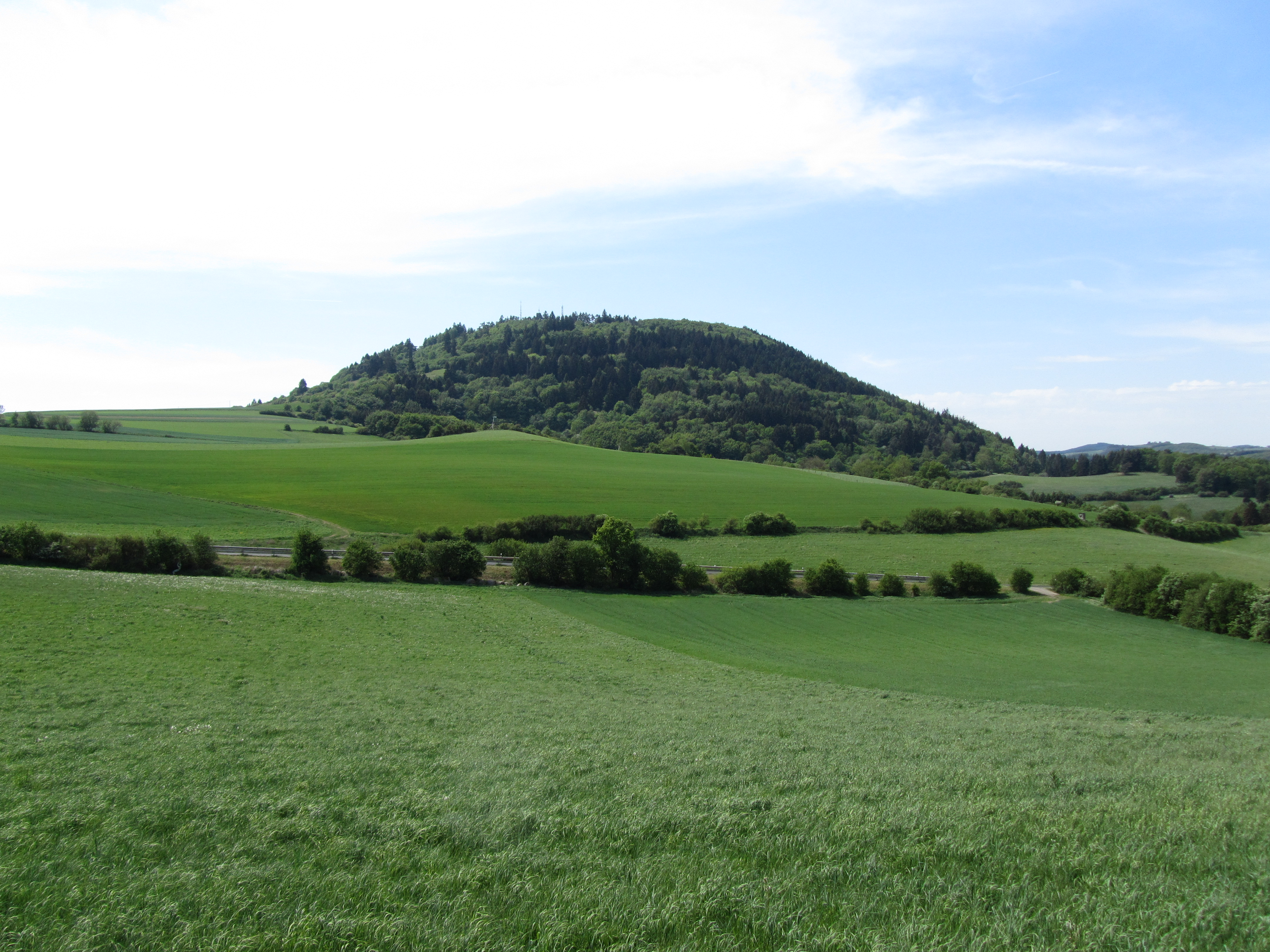
View from the L 82 (Ettringen–Bell) looking west-southwest to the Hochsimmer

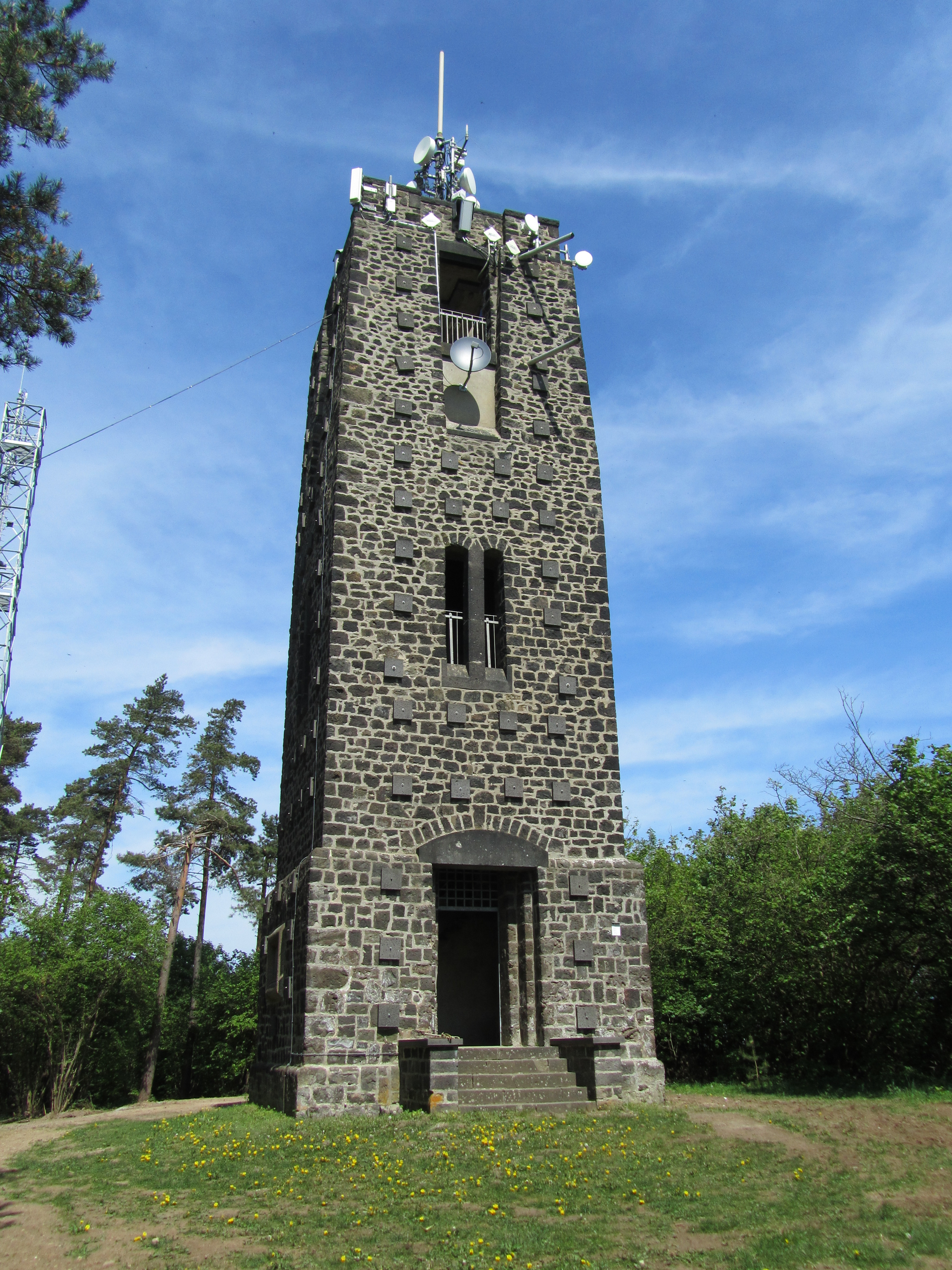
Hochsimmer Tower (viewing tower)

The Hochsimmer is a volcanic cone, 587.9 m above sea level (NHN), in the Eifel Mountains in Germany. It rises near Ettringen in the Rhineland-Palatine county of Mayen-Koblenz. At the summit is an observation tower, the Hochsimmer Tower.

== Geography ==
=== Location ===
The Hochsimmer rises within the High Eifel (East Eifel) around 1.7 km west-northwest of the village of Ettringen. Flowing past its western foot roughly from north to south is part of the middle reaches of the Rhine tributary, the Nette. Through its valley runs the Landesstraße 83, which links Weibern to the northwest with Mayen to the southeast. At the eastern foot of the hill is the L 82 road to Bell, and, at its southern foot is the village of St. Johann.

=== Height and summits ===
The Hochsimmer has two domed summits or kuppen: the West Top (West Top 50°21′38.5″N 7°11′54.8″E) is 587.9 m high and the East Top (East Top 50°21′36.3″N 7°12′9.1″E) is 583.3 m high. About 600 metres southwest of the summit is the Kleiner Simmer (514.7 m).

== Towers ==
On the east top of the Hochsimmer stands the 18-metre-high Hochsimmer Tower, an observation tower built in 1909 and 1911. From its viewing platform there is a view of the Eastern High Eifel, the Middle Rhine Basin and of Ettringen; in good visibility, even Cologne Cathedral may be seen. About 30 metres northwest of the viewing tower is a transmission tower.

== Gallery ==
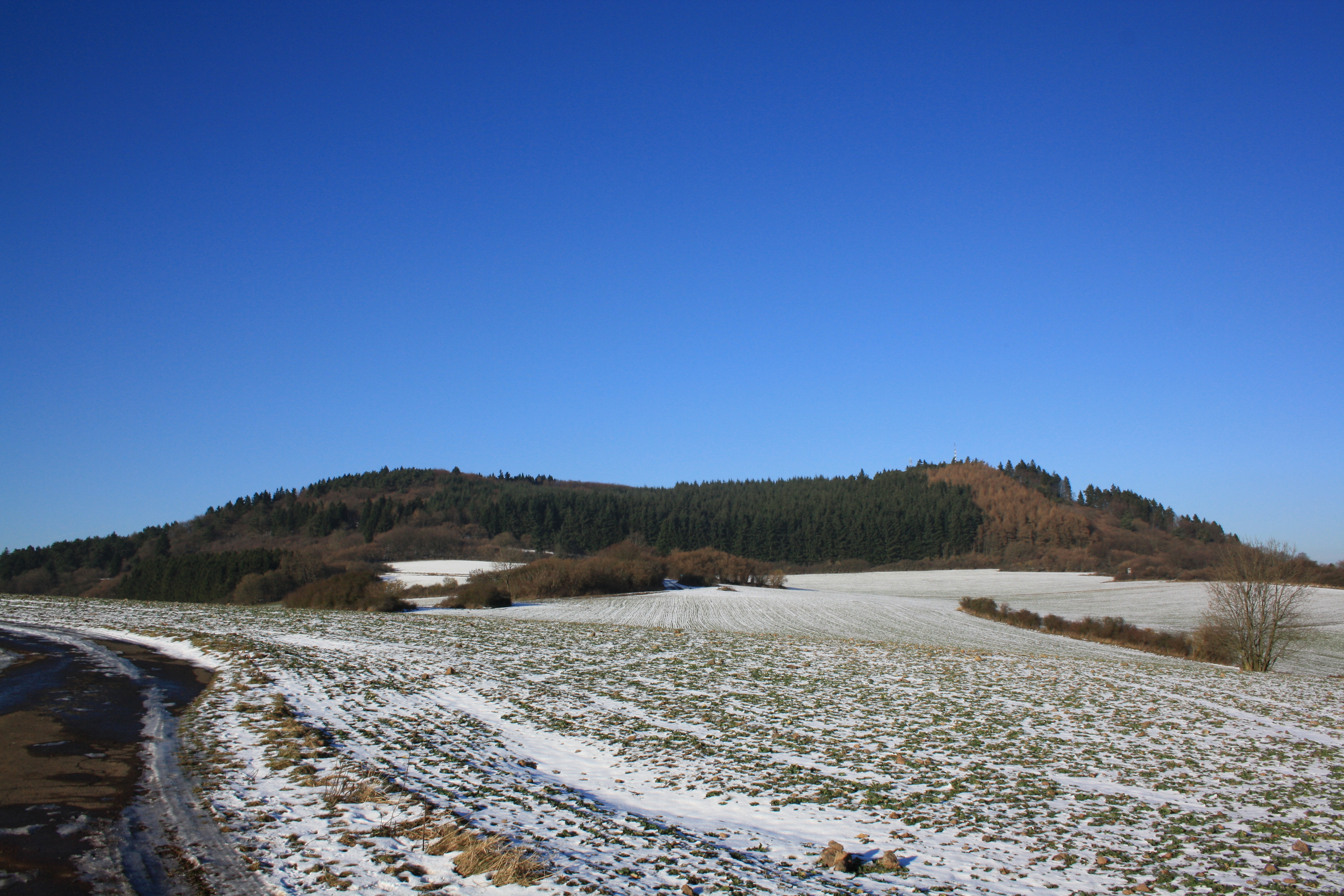
The Hochsimmer from the south

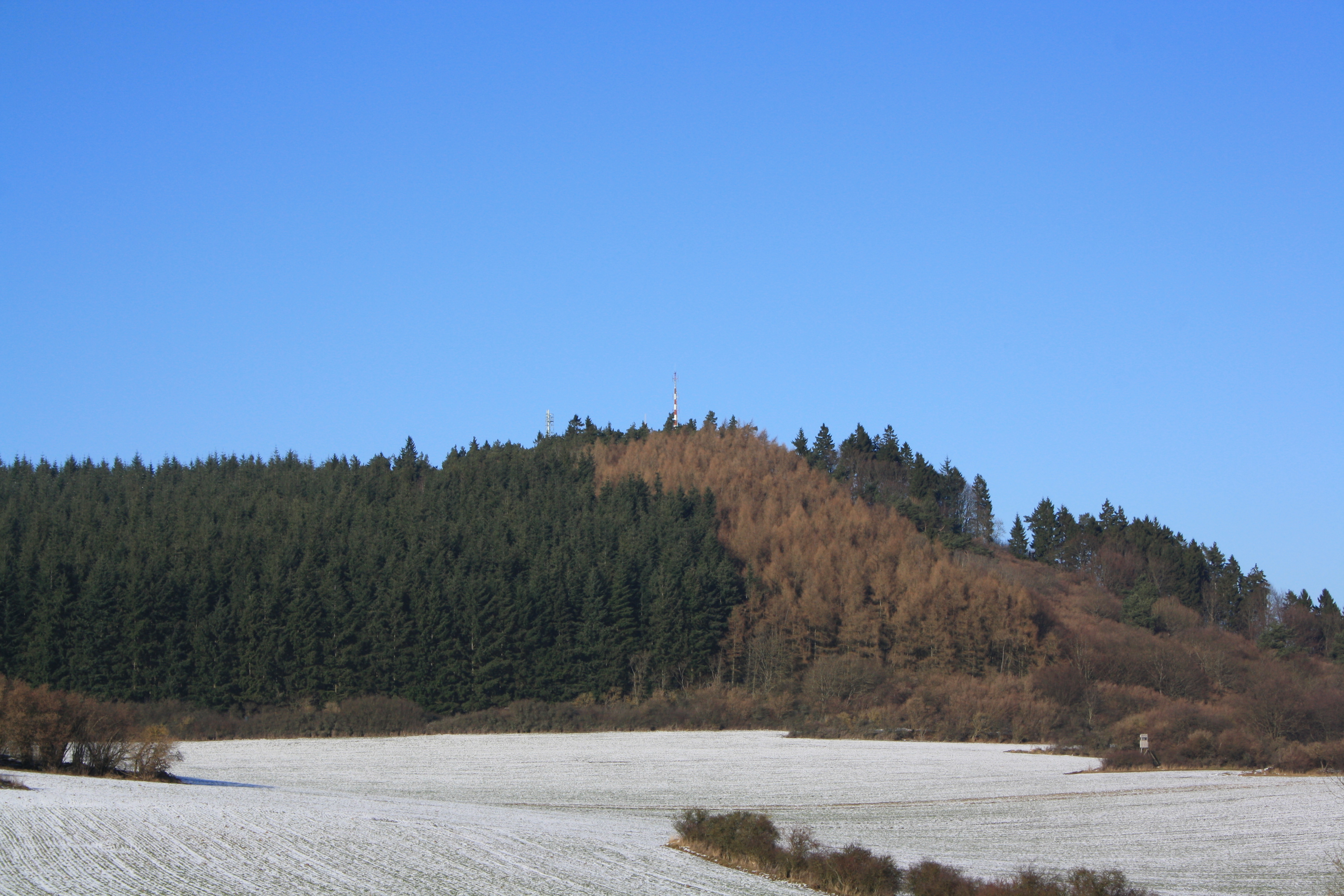
The East Top from the south

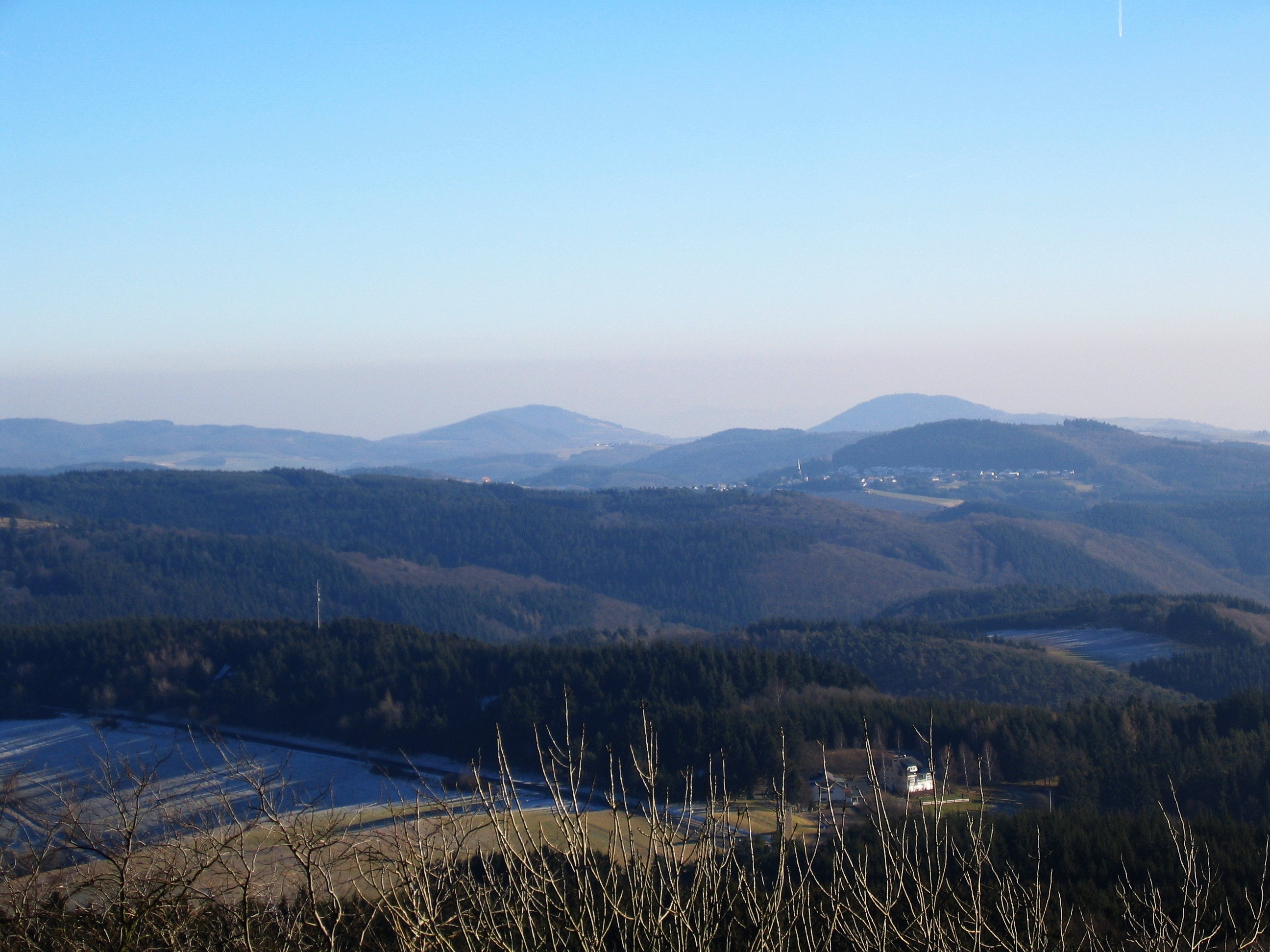
The Hochsimmer (right), seen from the Hohe Acht

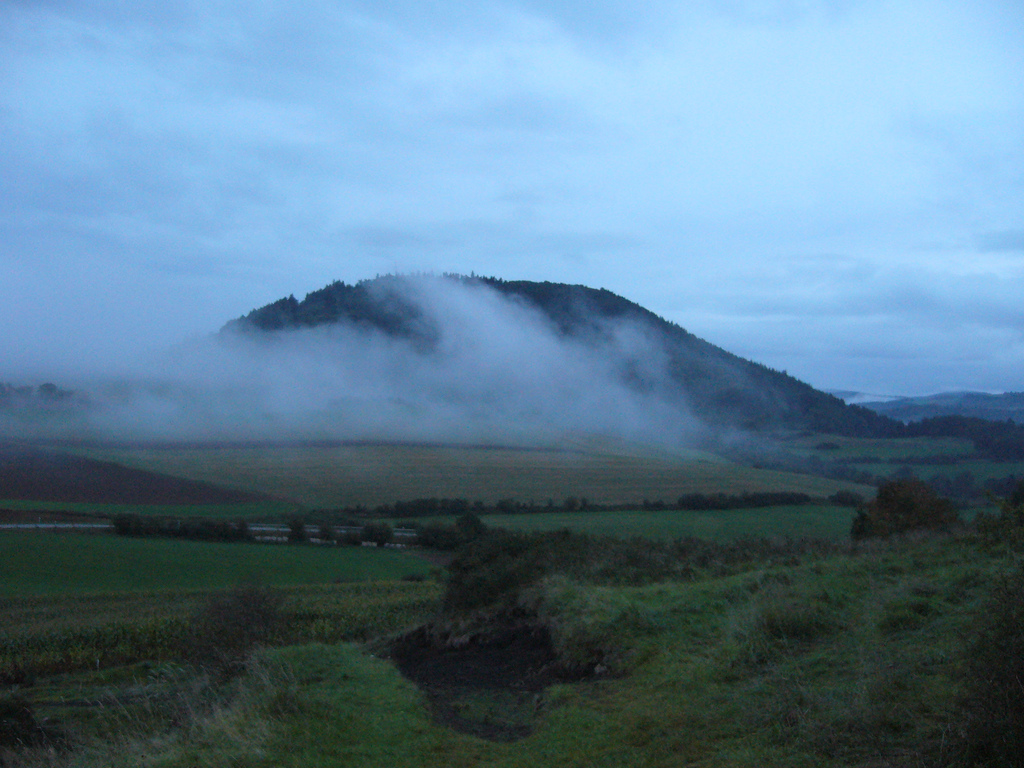
View from Hochstein

== See also ==
- List of volcanoes in Germany
