= Roland Z-602 =

German ultralight aircraft

Z-602
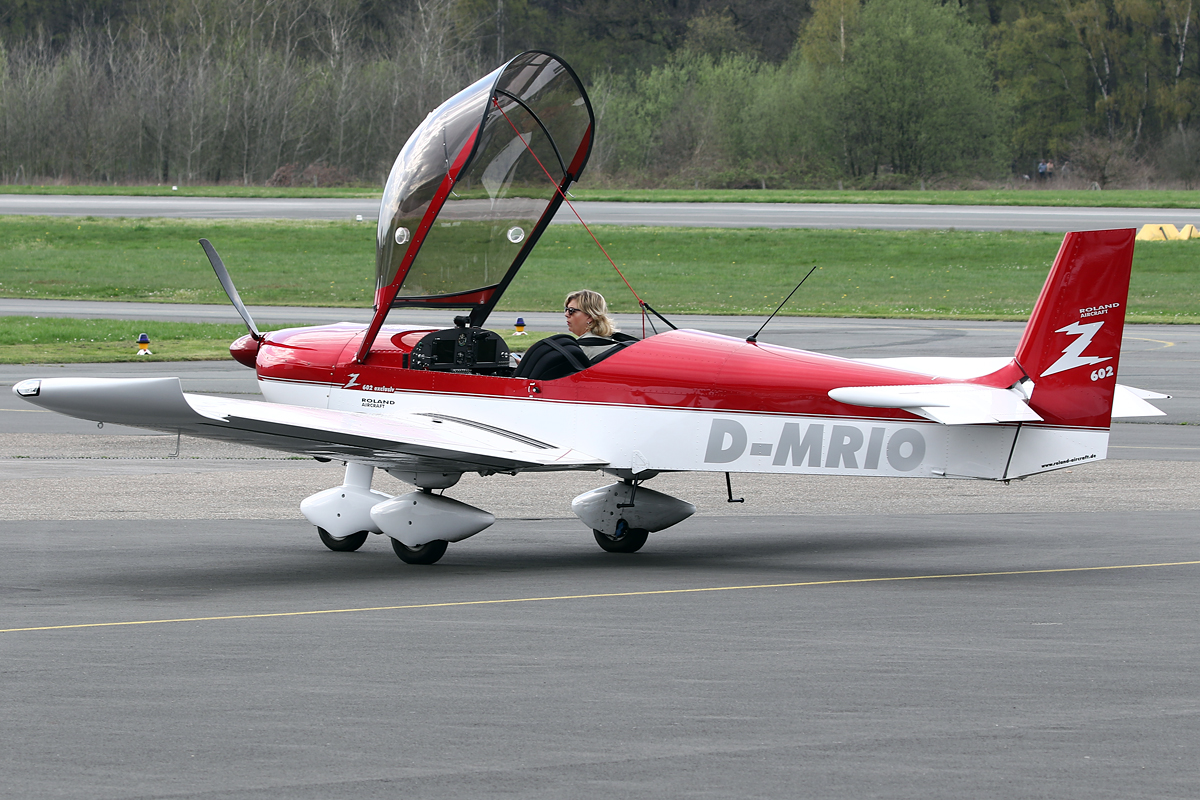

General information
- Type: Ultralight aircraft and Light-sport aircraft
- National origin: Germany
- Manufacturer: Roland Aircraft
- Status: In production (2012)

The Roland Z-602 is a German ultralight and light-sport aircraft, produced by Roland Aircraft of Mendig. The aircraft is supplied as a kit for amateur construction or as a complete ready-to-fly-aircraft.

== Design and development ==
The aircraft was designed to comply with the Fédération Aéronautique Internationale microlight rules and US light-sport aircraft rules. It features a cantilever low-wing, a two-seats-in-side-by-side configuration enclosed cockpit under a bubble canopy, fixed tricycle landing gear or conventional landing gear and a single engine in tractor configuration.

The aircraft is made from sheet aluminum. Its 8.23 m (27.0 ft) span wing has an area of 12.4 m^{2} (133 sq ft) and flaps. The standard engine available is the 100 hp (75 kW) Rotax 912ULS four-stroke powerplant.

The Z-602 is offered with three landing gear configurations: fixed tricycle, conventional and retractable as the RG model. It is sold with two different levels of options, the Economy and the Exclusiv. The fixed gear model can be derigged and transported by trailer in 20 minutes.

As of August 2012, the design does not appear on the Federal Aviation Administration's list of approved special light-sport aircraft.

== Operational history ==
Reviewer Marino Boric described the design in a 2015 review as having "an elegant appearance in flight."

== Specifications (Z-602 Exclusiv RG) ==
Data from Bayerl and Roland Aircraft

General characteristics

- Crew: one
- Capacity: one passenger
- Length: 6.10 m (20 ft 0 in)
- Wingspan: 8.23 m (27 ft 0 in)
- Wing area: 12.4 m^{2} (133 sq ft)
- Empty weight: 286 kg (631 lb)
- Gross weight: 590 kg (1,301 lb)
- Fuel capacity: 130 litres (29 imp gal; 34 US gal) in two tanks
- Powerplant: 1 × Rotax 912ULS four cylinder, liquid and air-cooled, four stroke aircraft engine, 75 kW (101 hp)

Performance

- Maximum speed: 243 km/h (151 mph, 131 kn)
- Cruise speed: 230 km/h (140 mph, 120 kn)
- Stall speed: 63 km/h (39 mph, 34 kn)
- Never exceed speed: 243 km/h (151 mph, 131 kn)
- Service ceiling: 3,700 m (12,000 ft)
- g limits: +6/-6
- Rate of climb: 5 m/s (980 ft/min)
- Wing loading: 47.6 kg/m^{2} (9.7 lb/sq ft)
