= Roland Me 109 Replica =

German homebuilt aircraft

Me 109 Replica

General information
- Type: Ultralight aircraft and Light-sport aircraft
- National origin: Germany
- Manufacturer: Roland Aircraft
- Status: Under development (2012)
- Number built: one prototype

History
- Developed from: Messerschmitt Bf 109

The Roland Me 109 Replica is a German ultralight and light-sport aircraft, under development by Roland Aircraft of Mendig. The aircraft is an 83% replica of the Second World War Messerschmitt Bf 109 G-6 fighter aircraft and will be supplied as a kit for amateur construction or as a complete ready-to-fly-aircraft.

== Design and development ==
The aircraft was designed to comply with the Fédération Aéronautique Internationale microlight rules and US light-sport aircraft rules. Like the aircraft it replicates, it features a cantilever low-wing, a two-seats-in-tandem enclosed cockpit under a framed canopy, retractable conventional landing gear and a single engine in tractor configuration.

The aircraft is predominantly made from aluminum sheet. Its 8.13 m (26.7 ft) span wing has an area of 17.5 m^{2} (188 sq ft) and mounts flaps. The standard engine intended is the 100 hp (75 kW) Rotax 912ULS, although consideration is being given to using a 180 hp (134 kW) four-stroke powerplant as well.

The plan is to produce the Me 109 Replica under sub-contract in the Czech Republic.

== Specifications (Me 109 Replica) ==
Data from Bayerl and Roland Aircraft

General characteristics

- Crew: one
- Capacity: one passenger
- Length: 7.41 m (24 ft 4 in)
- Wingspan: 8.13 m (26 ft 8 in)
- Wing area: 17.5 m^{2} (188 sq ft)
- Gross weight: 600 kg (1,323 lb)
- Powerplant: 1 × Rotax 912ULS four cylinder liquid and air-cooled, horizontally-opposed, piston engine, 75 kW (101 hp)

Performance

- Maximum speed: 300 km/h (190 mph, 160 kn)
- Wing loading: 34.3 kg/m^{2} (7.0 lb/sq ft)

== See also ==
- Peak Aerospace Me 109R - a similar replica
- W.A.R. BF-109
