= Roland Aircraft =

German aircraft manufacturer

- Company type: Privately held company
- Industry: Aerospace
- Headquarters: Mendig, Germany
- Products: Kit aircraft
- Owner: Roland Hauke
- Website: www.roland-aircraft.de

Roland Aircraft is a German aircraft manufacturer based in Mendig. The company is owned by Roland Hauke and specializes in the manufacture of all-metal aircraft, made from aluminium sheet.

While known for its Roland Me 109 Replica, the company also builds the Roland S-STOL two seat STOL design and the Roland Z-120 Relax, a single-seat high-wing design for the German 120 kg class.

== Aircraft ==
Summary of aircraft built by Roland Aircraft
Model name	First flight	Number built	Type
Roland Me 109 Replica			Warbird replica
Roland S-STOL			two seat, STOL, high-wing ultralight aircraft
Roland Z-120 Relax			single seat, high-wing, ultralight aircraft
Roland Z-602			two seat, low-wing, ultralight aircraft
