= Rieden =

Rieden may refer to:

- in Switzerland
  - Rieden, Switzerland, in the canton of St. Gallen
  - Rieden, Zurich, part of Wallisellen
- in Germany:
  - Rieden, Upper Palatinate, in Bavaria
  - Rieden, Swabia, in the Ostallgäu district, Bavaria
  - Rieden am Forggensee, in the Ostallgäu district, Bavaria
  - Rieden, Rhineland-Palatinate, in the Mayen-Koblenz district, Rhineland-Palatinate
