= Roland Z-120 Relax =

German ultralight aircraft

Z-120 Relax

General information
- Type: Ultralight aircraft
- National origin: Germany
- Manufacturer: Roland Aircraft
- Status: In production (2017)

The Roland Z-120 Relax is a German ultralight aircraft, designed and produced by Roland Aircraft of Mendig, introduced at the AERO Friedrichshafen show in 2015. The aircraft is supplied as a kit for amateur construction or complete and ready-to-fly.

== Design and development ==
The Z-120 was designed to comply with the German 120 kg class rules, hence its designation. It features a cantilever high-wing, a single-seat, an enclosed cabin accessed by open doorways, fixed conventional landing gear and a single engine in tractor configuration.

The aircraft is made from special thin-gauge sheet aluminum for lightness. Its 7.45 m (24.4 ft) span wing has an area of 9.6 m^{2} (103 sq ft) and lacks flaps. The standard engine used is a 35 hp (26 kW) Woelfe Aixro XF40 single-rotor Wankel engine.

== Specifications (Z-120) ==
Data from Tacke

General characteristics

- Crew: one
- Wingspan: 7.45 m (24 ft 5 in)
- Wing area: 9.6 m^{2} (103 sq ft)
- Empty weight: 120 kg (265 lb)
- Gross weight: 245 kg (540 lb)
- Fuel capacity: 25 litres (5.5 imp gal; 6.6 US gal)
- Powerplant: 1 × Woelfe Aixro XF40 single-rotor Wankel engine, 26 kW (35 hp)
- Propellers: 2-bladed fixed pitch

Performance

- Maximum speed: 160 km/h (99 mph, 86 kn)
- Cruise speed: 140 km/h (87 mph, 76 kn)
- Stall speed: 54 km/h (34 mph, 29 kn)
- Rate of climb: 2.5 m/s (490 ft/min)
- Wing loading: 25.5 kg/m^{2} (5.2 lb/sq ft)
