= Freedom Festival =

Freedom Festival may refer to:

- America's Freedom Festival at Provo, held annually in Provo, Utah
- Evansville Freedom Festival, held annually in Evansville, Indiana
- Freedom Festival, Hull, held annually in Kingston upon Hull, United Kingdom
- Porcupine Freedom Festival, held annually in Lancaster, New Hampshire
- Windsor–Detroit International Freedom Festival, a multi-national event held at the border cities of Detroit, Michigan and Windsor, Ontario

== See also ==
- FreedomFest, a Libertarian festival
