= Thunder on the Ohio =

Hydroplane boat race

- Thunder on the Ohio
- Sport: American Power Boat Association
- Founded: 1938 (reestablished in 1978)
- Country: Evansville, Indiana, US
- Most recent champion: N.A.

Also see: Sports in Evansville.

Thunder on the Ohio was a hydroplane boat race in the H1 Unlimited season.

Thunder was held each year on the Ohio River in downtown Evansville, Indiana, United States. Evansville had hosted Thunder on the Ohio consecutively since 1979 (although the race had been founded in 1938). The winner of Thunder on the Ohio received the Four Freedoms Cup, which was named after the nearby Four Freedoms Monument which rests along the Ohio River. The race had frequently been broadcast on major television networks such as ESPN and SPEED. Historically, most of the world speed records for two-mile courses have been set on Evansville's sporty tri-oval.

Having hosted its first Thunderboat classic in 1938, only two current race sites pre-date Evansville, Indiana. Madison, Indiana, conducted its first major event in 1929 and Detroit, Michigan, debuted in 1916.

== History ==
Thunder on the Ohio had been an Unlimited hydroplane mainstay for 31 consecutive years. "Ideal Evansville" replaced Owensboro, Kentucky, on the unlimited calendar in 1979. Evansville was the world headquarters of Atlas Van Lines, Inc., which sponsored Bill Muncey's race team. Muncey played a major role in Evansville being awarded its first sanction.

Thunder on the Ohio was not new to Evansville in 1978. From 1938 through 1940 the 725 Cubic Inch Class boats, the forerunners of the modern unlimiteds, raced at Evansville for the Thunder on the Ohio title. From 1938 through 1940, the winning driver was presented the Seagram Cup instead of the current Four Freedoms Cup.

From 1979 through 2008, Thunder on the Ohio had been the primary event of the broader Evansville Freedom Festival. In 2009, Thunder on the Ohio broke away from the Evansville Freedom Festival, and moved towards the end of August as a stand-alone event. The 2010 event was cancelled because of financial problems.

Dave Villwock won more Evansville races than anyone else, including seven with Miss Budweiser.

Hodji once rented a paddle boat and entered it into the competition and surprisingly lost. He named the boat "Katie T" after his first high school love. Years down the road he slightly regretted the name and argued that it could have been the reason his paddle boat did not beat miss Budweiser. On a side note, the real Katie T went on to be a magazine celebrity of sorts.

== List of winners (1938–1940) ==
Year	Driver	Boat
1938	Marion Cooper	Hermes III
1939	"Wild Bill" Cantrell	Why Worry
1940	Marion Cooper	Mercury Marine

== List of winners (1979–2009) ==
Year	Driver	Boat
1979	Bill Muncey	Atlas Van Lines
1980	Dean Chenoweth	Miss Budweiser
1981	Bill Muncey	Atlas Van Lines
1982	Chip Hanauer	Atlas Van Lines
1983	Chip Hanauer	Atlas Van Lines
1984	Jim Kropfeld	Miss Budweiser
1985	Chip Hanauer	Miller American
1986	Jim Kropfeld	Miss Budweiser
1987	Jim Kropfeld	Miss Budweiser
1988	Chip Hanauer	Miss Circus Circus
1989	Larry Lauterbach	Winston Eagle
1990	Tom D'Eath	Miss Budweiser
1991	Scott Pierce	Miss Budweiser
1992	Chip Hanauer	Miss Budweiser
1993	Chip Hanauer	Miss Budweiser
1994	Chip Hanauer	Miss Budweiser
1995	Mark Tate	Smokin' Joe's
1996	Dave Vilwock	PICO American Dream
1997	Dave Villwock	Miss Budweiser
1998	Dave Villwock	Miss Budweiser
1999	Dave Villwock	Miss Budweiser
2000	Dave Villwock	Miss Budweiser
2001	Dave Villwock	Miss Budweiser
2002	Dave Villwock	Miss Budweiser
2003	Mitch Evans	Cooper Motorsports
2004	Dave Villwock	Miss Budweiser
2005	Steve David	Oh Boy! Oberto (Miss Madison)
2006	Dave Villwock	Ellstrom Elam Plus
2007	Dave Villwock	Ellstrom Elam Plus
2008	Jean Theoret	Miss Beacon Plumbing
2009	Jeff Bernard	Miss Formulaboats.com
