= Aixro XF-40 =

German aircraft motor

XF-40
- Type: Aircraft engine
- National origin: Germany
- Manufacturer: Aixro
- Major applications: Roland Z-120 Relax; Garland Vampire

The Aixro XF-40 (or XF40) is a German aircraft engine, designed and produced by Aixro of Aachen for use in ultralight aircraft.

== Design and development ==
The XF-40 is a single-rotor Wankel engine. It is a 294 cc (17.9 cu in) displacement, liquid-cooled, petrol engine design, with a poly V belt reduction drive with a reduction ratio of 1.25:1. It employs capacitor discharge ignition and produces 36 hp (27 kW) at 6500 rpm.

== Applications ==
- Roland Z-120 Relax
- Garland Vampire

== Specifications (XF-40) ==
Data from Tacke

=== General characteristics ===
- Type: Single rotor Wankel aircraft engine
- Displacement: 294 cc (17.9 cu in)
- Length: 300 mm (11.8 in)
- Width: 250 mm (9.8 in)
- Height: 250 mm (9.8 in)
- Dry weight: 18.7 kg (41.2 lb)

=== Components ===
- Fuel type: petrol
- Cooling system: liquid
- Reduction gear: poly V belt

=== Performance ===
- Power output: 36 hp (27 kW)

== See also ==
Related lists

- List of aircraft engines
