= Peak Aerospace Me 109R =

German homebuilt aircraft

Me 109
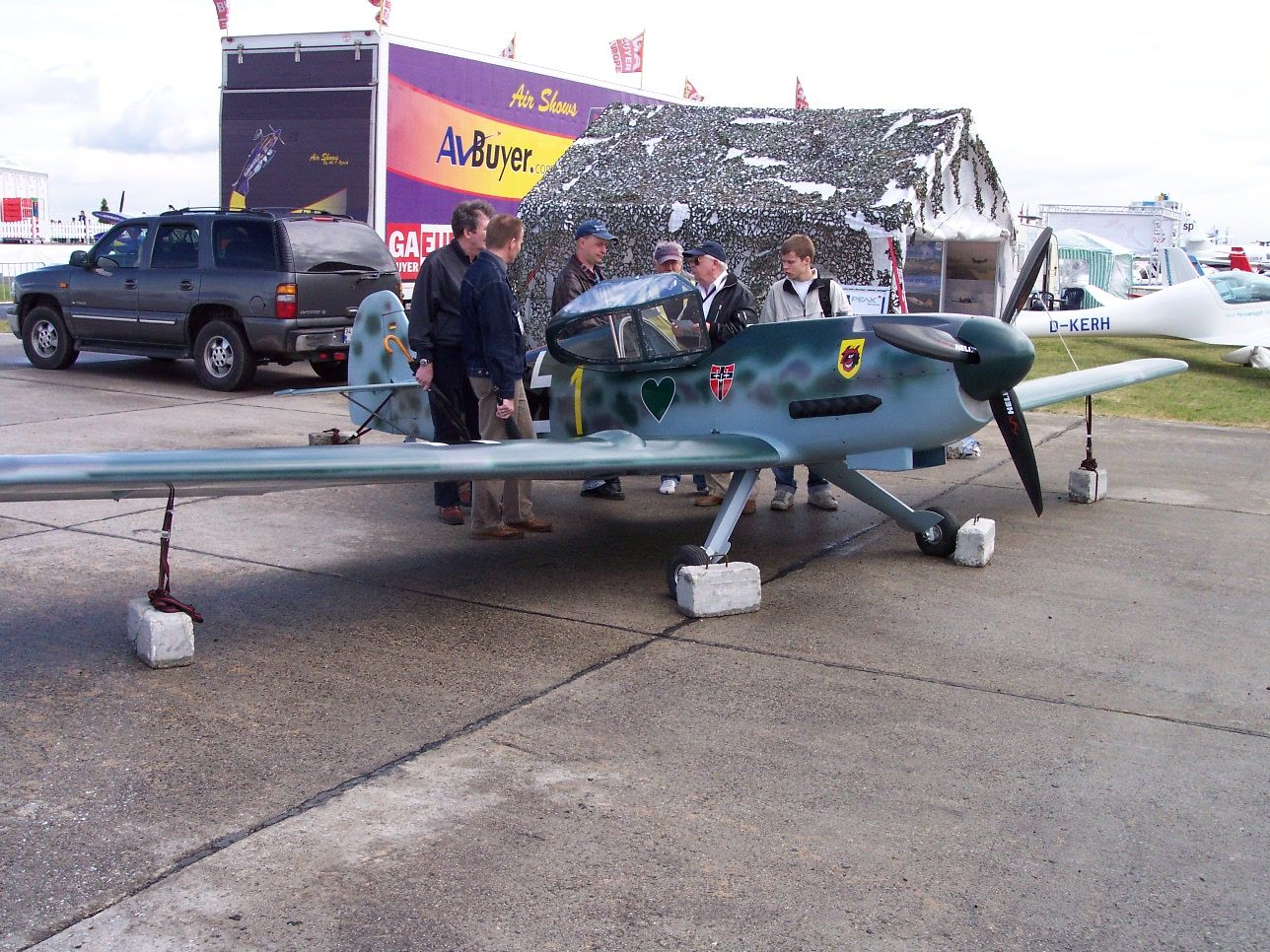
- Me 109R

General information
- Type: Ultralight aircraft
- National origin: Germany
- Manufacturer: Peak Aerospace; Classic Planes
- Designer: Tassilo Bek
- Status: In production (2013)

History
- First flight: 1991
- Developed from: Messerschmitt Bf 109

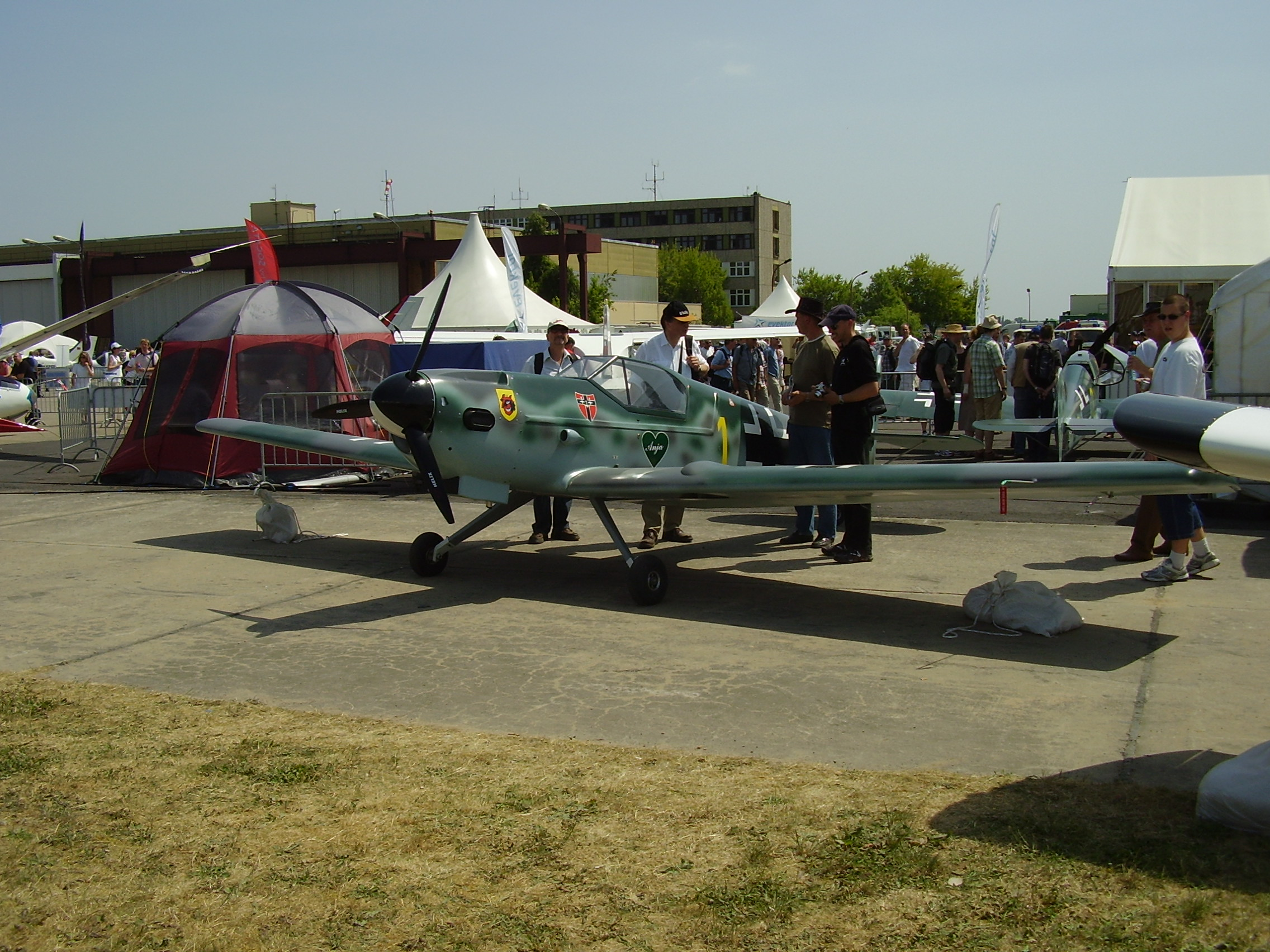
Me 109R

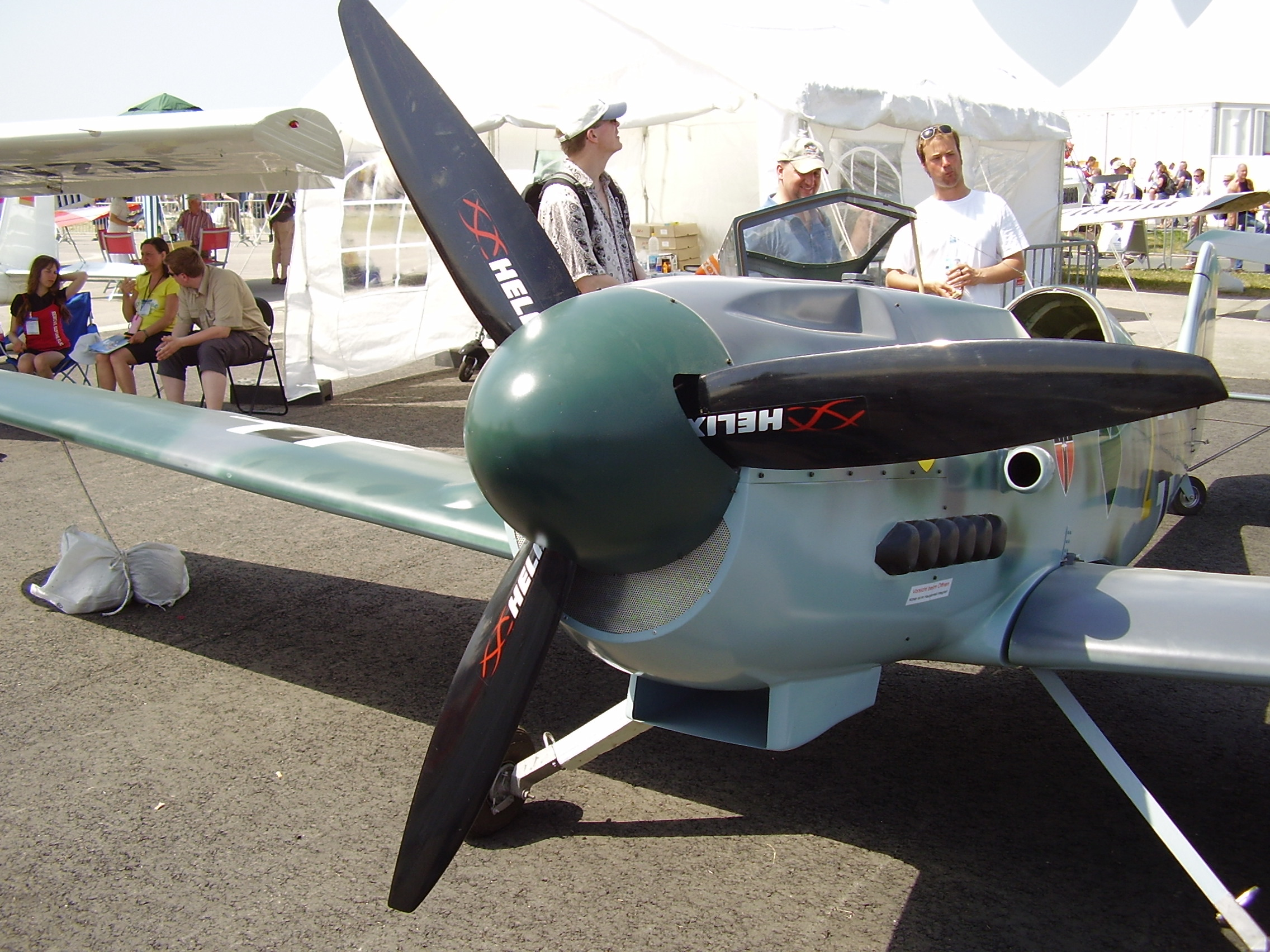
Me 109R

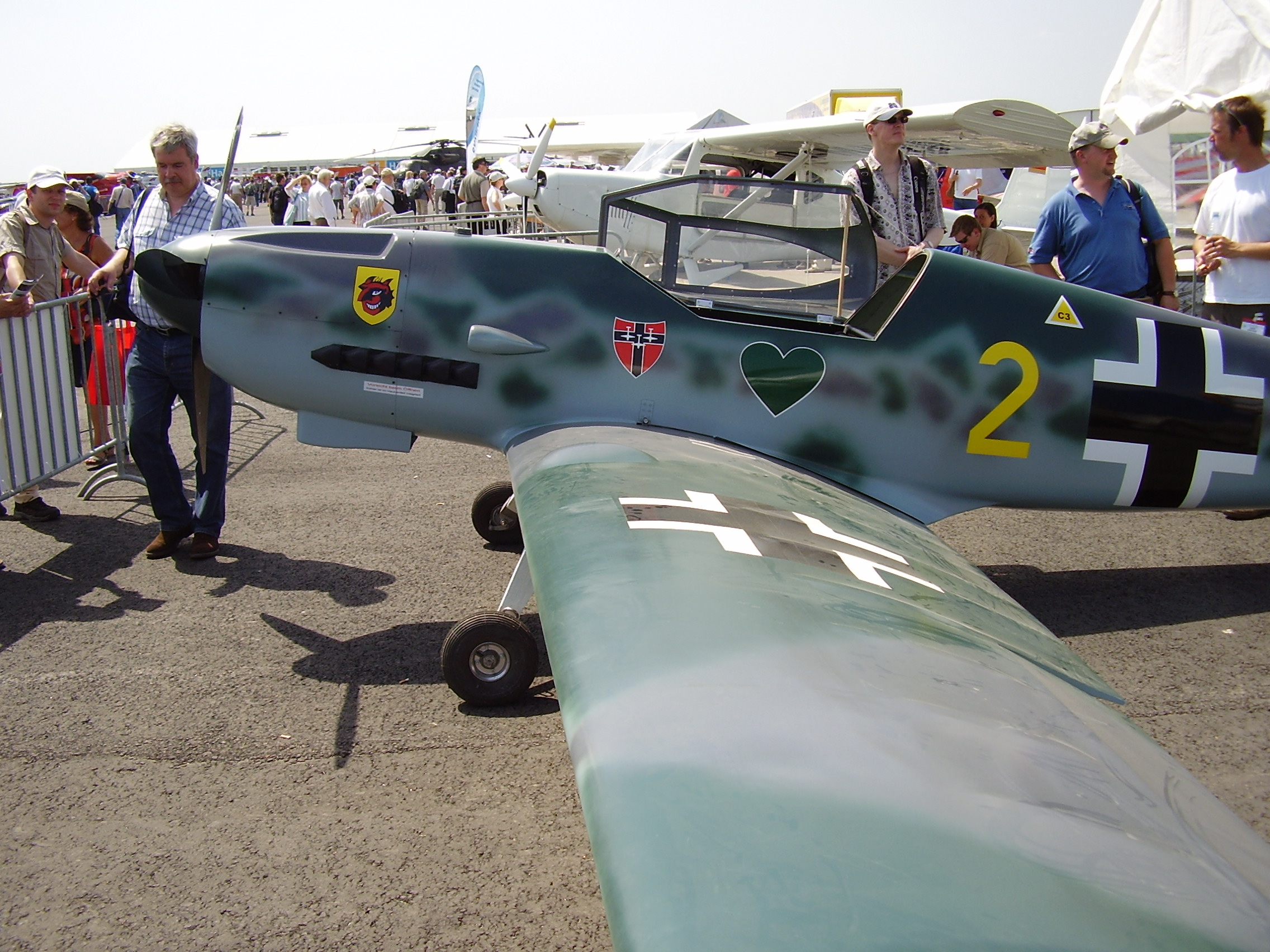
Me 109R

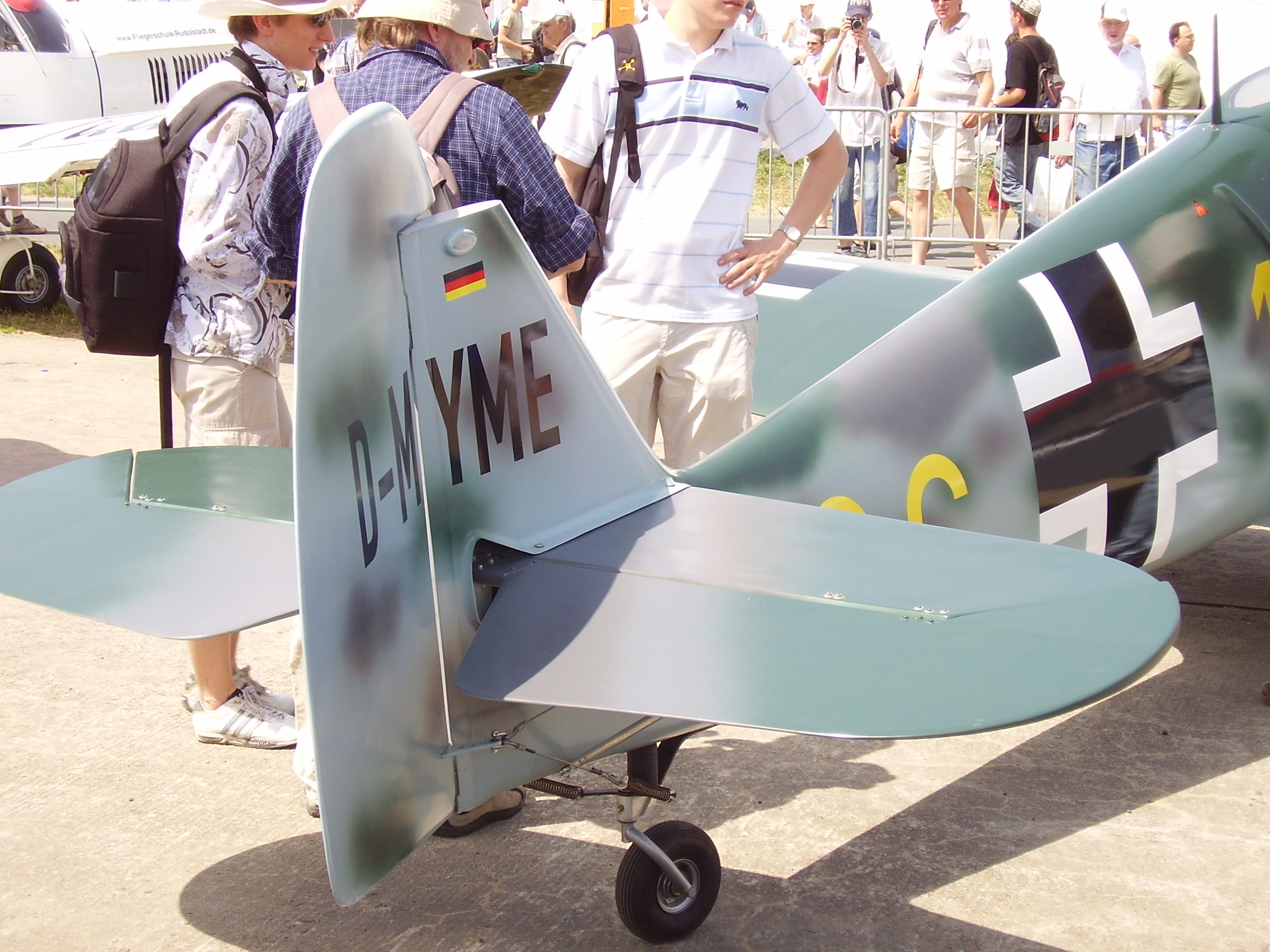
Me 109R

The Peak Aerospace Me 109R is a family of German replica warbird ultralight aircraft that was designed by Tassilo Bek, and originally produced by Peak Aerospace of Pasewalk. The company since changed its name to Classic Planes GmbH. The design, first flown in 1991, is an 80% scale replica of the Second World War Messerschmitt Bf 109 and is supplied as a kit for amateur construction or as a complete ready-to-fly-aircraft.

== Design and development ==
The aircraft was designed to comply with the Fédération Aéronautique Internationale microlight rules. It features a cantilever low-wing, a single-seat enclosed cockpit, retractable conventional landing gear and a single engine in tractor configuration.

The first replica was inspired by Bek's inspection of a Loehle 5151 Mustang scale replica fighter at AirVenture in the late 1980s. He was impressed with the scale warbird, but wanted a German aircraft and so returned home and set out to design an Me 109 replica.

The first prototype, registered D-MBAK, was of all wooden construction, powered by a Hirth 2704 producing only 40 hp (30 kW) and first flew in 1991. This aircraft achieved 190 km/h (118 mph) on its low power output, but Bek started a second prototype based on lessons learned in 1992. The second aircraft, registered D-MYBB, first flew in 1992, but was lost in an accident that same year. Bek's third prototype, D-MNBP, was flown in about 1994 and resulted in some kits being sold.

Bek flew a homebuilt category version of the Me 109 in 1996, powered by a Hirth F30 and later a Subaru automotive conversion, which became the prototype of the Me 109R kit aircraft. Bek then sold the company and the new owner ceased development of the Me 109. In 2003 Christian Engelen purchased the project and continued work on the aircraft, officially re-launching it in 2004. Since then production has continued on a demand basis.

The current production version, the Me 109R is made from composites. Its 8.10 m (26.6 ft) span wing has an area of 10.53 m^{2} (113.3 sq ft) and flaps. Standard engines available include the 64 hp (48 kW) Rotax 582 two-stroke, the 70 hp (52 kW) Weber Motor MPE 750 and the 80 hp (60 kW) D-Motor LF26 four-stroke powerplants.

== Variants ==
Me 109R Microlight
Version for the European microlight class with a gross weight of 300 kg (660 lb)
Me 109R Experimental
Version for the homebuilt aircraft class with a gross weight of 500 kg (1,100 lb), stressed for +6/-4g and intended for aerobatics. Powered by an 80 hp (60 kW) Rotax 912UL, a 70 to 120 hp (52 to 89 kW) MPE 750 or 80 hp (60 kW) D-Motor LF26 boxer engine.

== Specifications (Me 109R) ==
Data from Bayerl and Peak Aerospace

General characteristics

- Crew: one
- Capacity: one passenger
- Length: 6.3 m (20 ft 8 in)
- Wingspan: 8.10 m (26 ft 7 in)
- Height: 1.5 m (4 ft 11 in)
- Wing area: 10.53 m^{2} (113.3 sq ft)
- Empty weight: 190 kg (419 lb)
- Gross weight: 322 kg (710 lb)
- Fuel capacity: 52 litres (11 imp gal; 14 US gal)
- Powerplant: 1 × Rotax 582 twin cylinder, liquid-cooled, two stroke aircraft engine, 48 kW (64 hp)
- Propellers: 3-bladed Helix-Carbon composite

Performance

- Maximum speed: 190 km/h (120 mph, 100 kn)
- Cruise speed: 175 km/h (109 mph, 94 kn)
- Stall speed: 59 km/h (37 mph, 32 kn)
- Never exceed speed: 190 km/h (120 mph, 100 kn)
- Rate of climb: 6 m/s (1,200 ft/min)
- Wing loading: 30.6 kg/m^{2} (6.3 lb/sq ft)

== See also ==
- Roland Me 109 Replica - a similar replica
- W.A.R. BF-109
