= Garland Aerospace =

Australian aircraft manufacturer

Garland Aerospace Pty Ltd
- Type: Privately held company
- Industry: Aerospace
- Founded: 2013
- Defunct: 2016
- Fate: Out of business
- Headquarters: Camden, New South Wales, Australia
- Key people: Director and CEO: Kenneth Sydney Garland
- Products: Ultralight aircraft, aircraft parts
- Services: Aircraft construction training

Garland Aerospace Pty Ltd was an Australian aircraft manufacturer based in Camden, New South Wales and founded by Kenneth Sydney Garland. The company specialized in the design and manufacture of ultralight aircraft in the form of kits for amateur construction and ready-to-fly aircraft.

The company was founded in about 2013 and seems to have gone out of business in 2016.

== History ==
Kenneth Garland holds the rights to the Sadler Vampire SV-2 design and had also acquired many of the drawings, tooling and parts for the design through his company Aero.V.Australia. Aero.V.Australia was an aircraft maintenance and repair company, that seems to have been formed in 2006 and gone out of business in 2013. Garland Aerospace was formed to develop the 1980s vintage Sadler Vampire design into the Garland Vampire. Three versions were produced, the GA-1 for the US FAR 103 Ultralight Vehicles category, the GA-2 an updated version for the homebuilt market and the GA-3 with more power and a higher gross weight.

Garland Aerospace was also engaged in developing a whole range of new aircraft designs. These included the GA-5 Warlang, a UAV version of the Vampire; the GA-6 Torana, a two seat design based on the Goair Trainer; the GA-7 Winjeel, a two-seat aircraft with conventional landing gear; the GA-8 Woomera, a new Vampire-based design for the US ultralight category, to be powered by a Compact Radial Engines MZ202 60 hp (45 kW) two stroke engine and the GA-9 Starship, a new design based on the Vampire with a Rotax 914 turbocharged 115 hp (86 kW) powerplant and retractable landing gear. There is no evidence that any of these aircraft were ever taken beyond the concept stage.

The company also provided aircraft construction technique classes to prospective aircraft builders in subjects including sheet metal, woodworking, aircraft fabric covering, welding, fibreglass construction and aircraft painting and finishing. The company also sold aircraft parts and piston aircraft engines.

== Aircraft ==
Summary of aircraft built by Garland:

- Garland Vampire
