= Roland S-STOL =

German STOL aircraft

S-STOL

General information
- Type: Ultralight aircraft and Light-sport aircraft
- National origin: Germany
- Manufacturer: Roland Aircraft
- Status: In production (2012)

The Roland S-STOL is a German STOL ultralight and light-sport aircraft, produced by Roland Aircraft. The aircraft is supplied as a kit for amateur construction or as a complete ready-to-fly-aircraft.

== Design and development ==
The aircraft was designed to comply with the Fédération Aéronautique Internationale microlight rules and US light-sport aircraft rules. It features a strut-braced high-wing, a two-seats-in-side-by-side configuration enclosed cockpit accessed via doors, fixed tricycle landing gear and a single engine in tractor configuration.

The aircraft is made from sheet aluminum. Its 8.20 m (26.9 ft) span wing has an area of 11.4 m^{2} (123 sq ft) leading edge slots and flaps. The wing is supported by V-struts with jury struts. The standard engine available is the 80 hp (60 kW) Rotax 912UL four-stroke powerplant. The S-STOL can be de-rigged for storage and folding wings are a factory option. The aircraft can be fitted with wheels, skis and floats and can be used to tow gliders and hang gliders.

== Operational history ==
Reviewer Marino Boric described the design in a 2015 review saying, "high reliability, robustness and real short-field ability make it a good-natured aircraft with forgiving characteristics both in the air and on the ground, where its robust undercarriage, high ground clearance and tundra tires help it cope with the roughest strips."

== Specifications (S-STOL) ==
Data from Bayerl and Roland Aircraft

General characteristics

- Crew: one
- Capacity: one passenger
- Length: 6.10 m (20 ft 0 in)
- Wingspan: 8.20 m (26 ft 11 in)
- Wing area: 11.4 m^{2} (123 sq ft)
- Empty weight: 275 kg (606 lb)
- Gross weight: 530 kg (1,168 lb)
- Fuel capacity: 90 litres (20 imp gal; 24 US gal) in two wing tanks
- Powerplant: 1 × Rotax 912UL four cylinder, liquid and air-cooled, four stroke aircraft engine, 60 kW (80 hp)

Performance

- Maximum speed: 180 km/h (110 mph, 97 kn)
- Cruise speed: 140 km/h (87 mph, 76 kn)
- Stall speed: 58 km/h (36 mph, 31 kn)
- Service ceiling: 4,600 m (15,000 ft)
- g limits: +6/-3
- Rate of climb: 6.5 m/s (1,280 ft/min)
- Wing loading: 46.5 kg/m^{2} (9.5 lb/sq ft)

== See also ==
- Zenith STOL CH 701
