= SCI Aviation =

- Headquarters: Shanghai, China
- Key people: 堡仕尔
- Products: Experimental aircraft engines
- Website: http://sci.aircraftnurse.com/

SCI Aviation is a Chinese aircraft engine manufacturer.

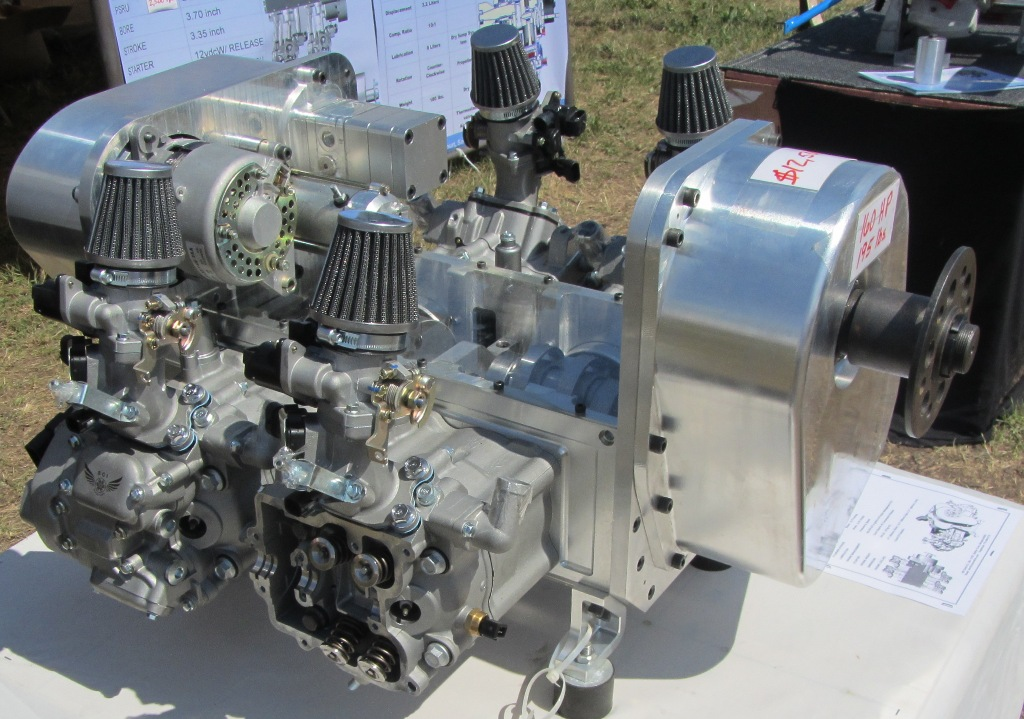
A SCI Aviation B4-160 engine

SCI Aviation started as an aircraft engine manufacturer when it bought the rights to the Sadler Radial engine originally intended for the Denny Kitfox homebuilt. The engine is redesigned and marketed as the R6-80. A follow-on of which is the R6-150. SCI also has designed a boxer engine using Suzuki 600cc cylinder heads on an aluminum block with gear reduction named the B4-160.

== Aircraft Engines ==
Summary of aircraft engines built by SCI Aviation
| Model name | First flight | Number built | Type |
|---|---|---|---|
| R6-80 | | | 80 hp Six cylinder radial |
| R6-150 | | | 150 hp Six cylinder radial |
| B4-160 | 2012 | | Four cylinder horizontally opposed |
