= Mendig (Verbandsgemeinde) =

- Verbandsgemeinde
- Location of Mendig within Mayen-Koblenz district
- Interactive map of Mendig
- Location within Germany Location within Rhineland-Palatinate
- Coordinates: 50°22′N 7°17′E
- Country: Germany
- State: Rhineland-Palatinate
- District: Mayen-Koblenz
- Seat: Mendig
- Subdivisions: 5 municipalities

Area
  - Total: 53.94 km^{2} (20.83 sq mi)

Population (2025-12-31)
  - Total: 13,678
  - Density: 253.6/km^{2} (656.8/sq mi)
- Time zone: UTC+01:00 (CET)
  - Summer (DST): UTC+02:00 (CEST)
- Website: www.mendig.de

Mendig is a Verbandsgemeinde ("collective municipality") in the district Mayen-Koblenz, in Rhineland-Palatinate, Germany. The seat of the municipality is in Mendig.

The Verbandsgemeinde Mendig consists of the following Ortsgemeinden ("local municipalities"):

1. Bell
2. Mendig
3. Rieden
4. Thür
5. Volkesfeld
