= Sadler Vampire =

American ultralight aircraft

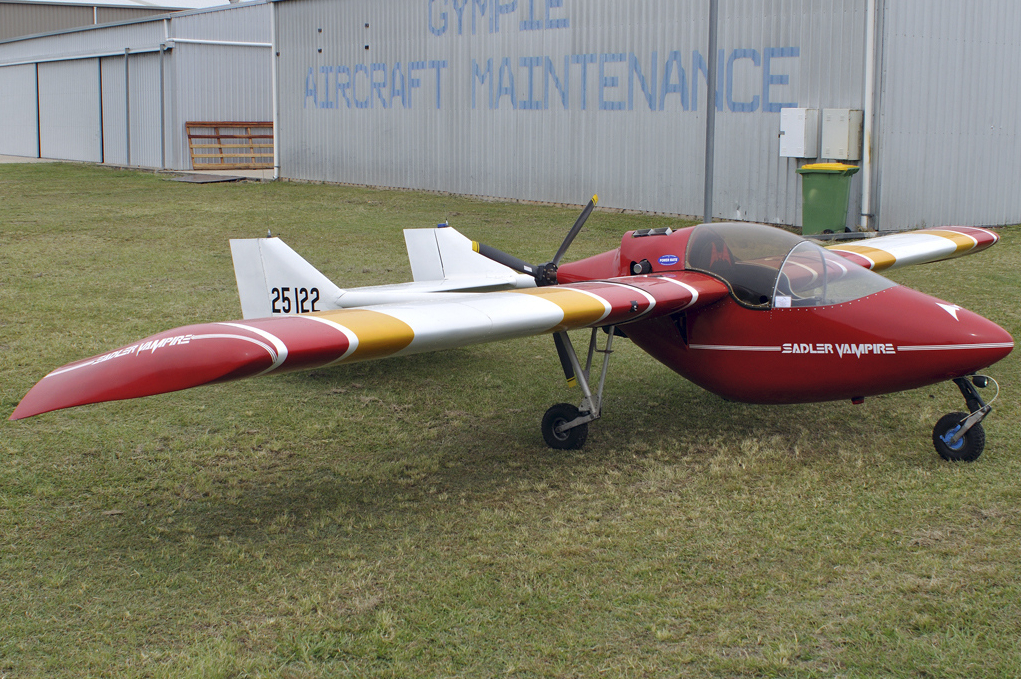

General information
- Type: Sport aircraft
- National origin: United States
- Manufacturer: American Microflight; Sadler Aircraft Company; Garland Aerospace; Wedgetail Aircraft
- Designer: William G. Sadler

History
- First flight: mid 1982
- Variant: Garland Vampire

The Sadler SV-1 Vampire is a single-seat ultralight sport aircraft developed in the United States in the early 1980s. It is uncharacteristic of ultralight designs in both its layout and its construction. The Vampire is a mid-wing cantilever monoplane of pod-and-boom configuration and twin booms joined by a common horizontal stabilizer. The wings fold for storage and transport, and the undercarriage is of fixed tricycle type. The single engine and pusher propeller are mounted at the rear of the pod that also includes the open cockpit. Construction throughout is of metal.

The Vampire won the "Grand Champion Design" Award at the EAA Fly-in at Oshkosh, Wisconsin in August 1982. Subsequently, designer William Sadler founded American Microflight (later Sadler Aircraft Company) to produce the aircraft. Series production began in February 1983, and had reached the rate of four per month by 1984. Rights to this sport version were sold to Aero.V Australia based at Illawarra Regional Airport in Albion Park Rail, New South Wales.

By the late 1980s, Sadler was offering a militarized version of the design as the Piranha. Equipped with an enclosed cockpit, bullet-resistant fuselage pod made of Kevlar, machine gun mounts in the wing roots, and a hardpoint under each wing for disposable stores, the Piranha is intended to provide ground attack, counter-insurgency, and interdiction missions. Power was originally provided by a converted Volkswagen air-cooled engine, but a converted Chevrolet V-8 automotive engine was eventually fitted. A UAV version was developed around the same time. Designated the UAV-18-50, it carried a pilot for takeoffs and landings. It never flew without a pilot on board and was never fitted with any armament.

In May 2010 it was announced that the company and its one prototype aircraft, some spares and one Jabiru 3300 engine were all for sale for US$50,000. Company vice president David Littlejohn placed the blame for the sale of the company on the economic downturn. "We failed to meet the required pipeline commitments needed to receive second-stage capital from our investors" he explained.

Garland Aerospace produced the Garland Vampire in Australia between 2013 and 2016, a series of designs developed from the original Vampire.

Wedgetail Aircraft of Camden, New South Wales, Australia started manufacturing the SV-2 Vampire in 2018.

== Variants ==
Prototype 1
The original prototype. 30' wing, 20 hp Solo single-cylinder 2-stroke engine.
Vampire
Production version with a 30' wing. American FAR Part 103 legal. Now back in production by Garland Aerospace as the Vampire I
SV-1
22' wing. Produced in Australia under license by Skywise Ultraflight with a KFM 107 engine. No longer produced.
SV-2
22' wing. Produced in Australia under license by Skywise Ultraflight with a Rotax 447 engine. No longer produced.
SV-2A
Very similar to the SV-2. Current production rights held by Garland Aerospace Pty Ltd.
SV-3
Similar to the SV-2A with an HKS-700E 4-stroke engine. Current Production rights held by Garland Aerospace.com.au.
UAV18-50/Experimental #001
Also known as the RPV18-50 and the OPV18-50. Similar to the SV-2 with shorter wings and thicker wing skins. Originally powered by a Rotax 503 engine. Produced for General Atomics for evaluation in the Predator program. Only 1 built.
A-22
Armed model designed for counterinsurgency, shares few components with the SV series. Originally powered by a 120hp Volkswagen engine with a turbocharged 180hp option, later by a 300hp Chevrolet V-6. Can mount dual 7.62mm M60 machine guns, 70mm rocket pods, and Mark 81 250lb bombs with a maximum payload of 1,000lbs. Attracted interest from several Eastern European countries. Unknown number built.
Piranha
Based on the A-22. Powered by a V-8 engine, capable of speeds up to 285 mph. Only 1 built.
Vampire 2
2-seat US-LSA compliant version. Original prototype destroyed in post-crash fire, Sept 2008. Introduced at AirVenture 2009. The two-seat LSA version draws heavily upon the Piranha design, including the landing gear, airframe and the folding wing system. The LSA version is powered by the 120 hp (89 kW) Jabiru 3300 four-stroke powerplant. As of August 2012, the design does not appear on the Federal Aviation Administration's list of approved special light-sport aircraft. Both the original ultralight and the 2-seat LSA version are known as the "Sadler Vampire."

== Specifications (Vampire Ultralight) ==
Data from Jane's All the World's Aircraft 1985–87, p.677

General characteristics

- Crew: One pilot
- Length: 17 ft 6 in (5.33 m)
- Wingspan: 28 ft 0 in (8.53 m)
- Height: 4 ft 8 in (1.42 m)
- Wing area: 116 sq ft (10.8 m^{2})
- Empty weight: 250 lb (114 kg)
- Gross weight: 550 lb (250 kg)
- Powerplant: 1 × KFM 107ER , 20 hp (15 kW)

Performance

- Maximum speed: 63 mph (101 km/h, 55 kn)
- Range: 300 mi (480 km, 260 nmi)
- Service ceiling: 10,500 ft (3,200 m)
- Rate of climb: 350 ft/min (1.8 m/s)
