= Garland Vampire =

Australian homebuilt aircraft

Vampire

General information
- Type: Amateur-built aircraft
- National origin: Australia
- Manufacturer: Garland Aerospace
- Status: Production completed (2016)

History
- Manufactured: 2013-2016
- Developed from: Sadler Vampire

The Garland Vampire is an Australian amateur-built aircraft that is derived from the Sadler Vampire and was produced by Garland Aerospace of Camden, New South Wales. When it was available the aircraft was supplied as a kit for amateur construction or as a complete ready-to-fly-aircraft.

The company seems to have been founded about 2013 and gone out of business in 2016 and production ended.

== Design and development ==
The Vampire features a cantilever mid-wing, a single-seat cockpit under a bubble canopy, fixed tricycle landing gear and a single engine in pusher configuration, with a twin-boom tail.

The aircraft is of mixed construction, with the wings, tail and tail-booms made from aluminum and the fuselage cockpit pod and wingtips from fibreglass. The aircraft can have its wings removed and be ready for ground trailer transport in 10 minutes, without the need to disconnect the flying controls.

== Variants ==
Vampire GA-1
This lower-powered model has a 7.4 m (24.3 ft) span wing with an area of 9.4 m^{2} (101 sq ft). The empty weight is 120 kg (265 lb) and gross weight 235 kg (518 lb). The standard engine used is the 36 hp (27 kW) Aixro XF-40 four-stroke Wankel engine.
Vampire GA-2
An updated model of the original SV-2 for the homebuilt market. The standard engine used is the 60 hp (45 kW) HKS 700E four-stroke powerplant.
Vampire GA-3
This higher-powered model incorporates Kevlar in the cockpit pod construction. It has a 7.0 m (23.0 ft) span wing with an area of 8.65 m^{2} (93.1 sq ft). The empty weight is 170 kg (375 lb) and gross weight 320 kg (705 lb). The standard engine used is the 60 hp (45 kW) HKS 700E four-stroke powerplant.

== Specifications (GA-3) ==
Data from Tacke

General characteristics

- Crew: one
- Wingspan: 7.0 m (23 ft 0 in)
- Wing area: 8.65 m^{2} (93.1 sq ft)
- Empty weight: 170 kg (375 lb)
- Gross weight: 320 kg (705 lb)
- Fuel capacity: 40 litres (8.8 imp gal; 11 US gal)
- Powerplant: 1 × HKS 700E two cylinder, air-cooled, four stroke aircraft engine, 45 kW (60 hp)
- Propellers: 3-bladed ground adjustable

Performance

- Maximum speed: 203 km/h (126 mph, 110 kn)
- Cruise speed: 175 km/h (109 mph, 94 kn)
- Stall speed: 63 km/h (39 mph, 34 kn)
- Rate of climb: 5 m/s (980 ft/min)
- Wing loading: 37.0 kg/m^{2} (7.6 lb/sq ft)
