= American Red Ball =

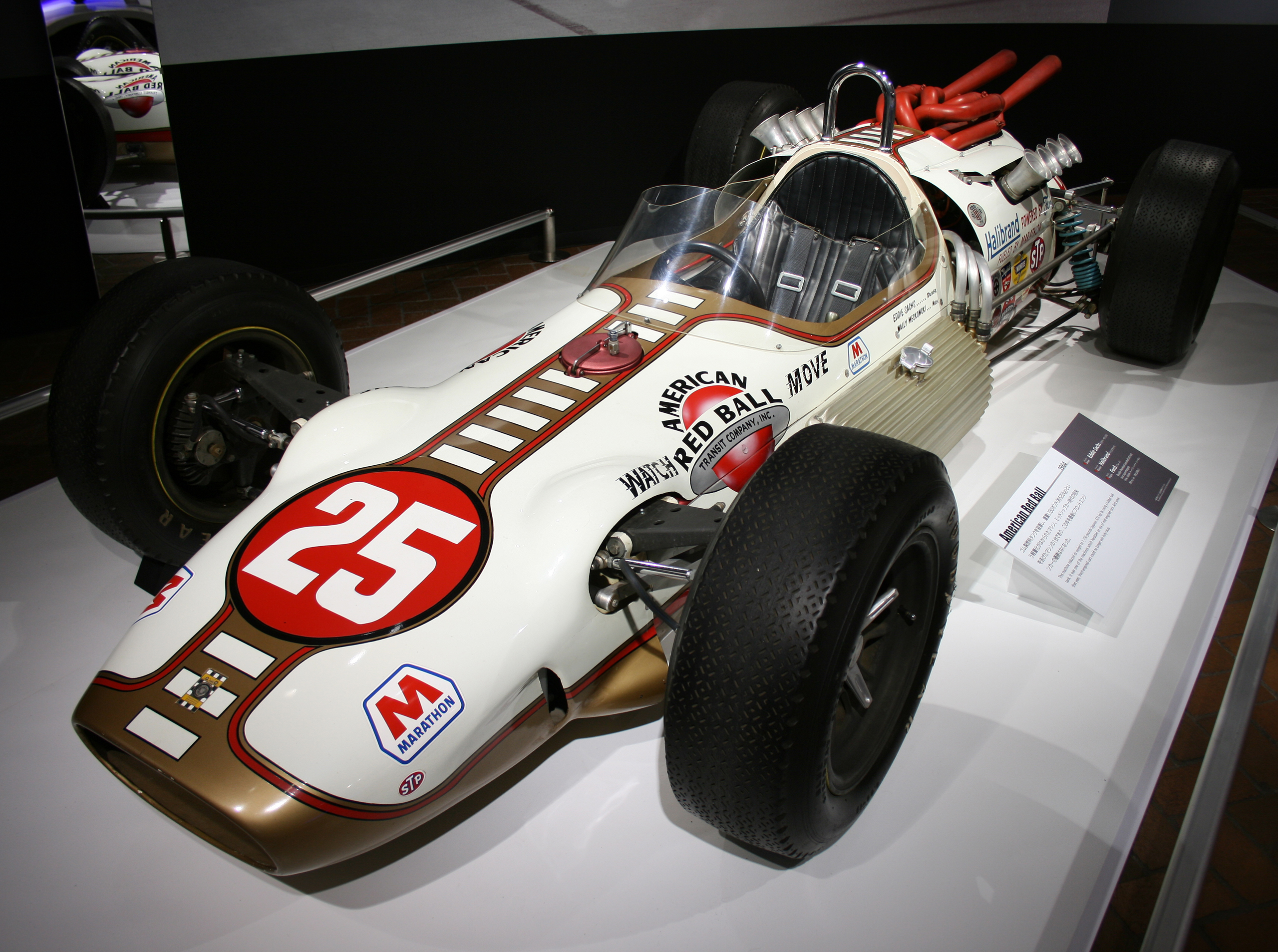
A replica of the American Red Ball Halibrand-Ford from the 1964 Indianapolis 500

American Red Ball is a moving company operating worldwide. It was founded in Indianapolis in 1919 as American Red Ball Transit Co. Inc.

In 1996, owners Walter and AliceJo Saubert sold the company to Atlas World Group. At the time it was the 13th largest mover in the United States. The domestic subsidiary was spun off to management in 2001. Atlas retained Red Ball International, a military mover.
