= W.A.R. BF-109 =

American homebuilt aircraft

General information
- Type: Homebuilt aircraft
- National origin: United States
- Manufacturer: War Aircraft Replicas International, Inc.

The W.A.R. BF-109 is a near-scale homebuilt replica of a Messerschmitt Bf 109 fighter.

== Variants ==
Some versions were built using 125 hp (93 kW) Lycoming O-235 and 123 hp (92 kW) HCI radial engines.

== Specifications (W.A.R. BF-109) ==
General characteristics

- Crew: 1
- Capacity: 1
- Empty weight: 600 lb (272 kg)
- Gross weight: 900 lb (408 kg)
- Powerplant: 1 × Continental O-200 , 100 hp (75 kW)

Performance

- Maximum speed: 143 kn (165 mph, 266 km/h)
- Cruise speed: 117 kn (135 mph, 217 km/h)
- Stall speed: 48 kn (55 mph, 89 km/h)
- Range: 350 nmi (400 mi, 640 km)
- Wing loading: 12 lb/sq ft (59 kg/m^{2})

== See also ==
- Peak Aerospace Me 109R
- Roland Me 109 Replica
