= Bill Sadler (engineer) =

Canadian race car builder, engineer, and aviation designer (1931–2022)

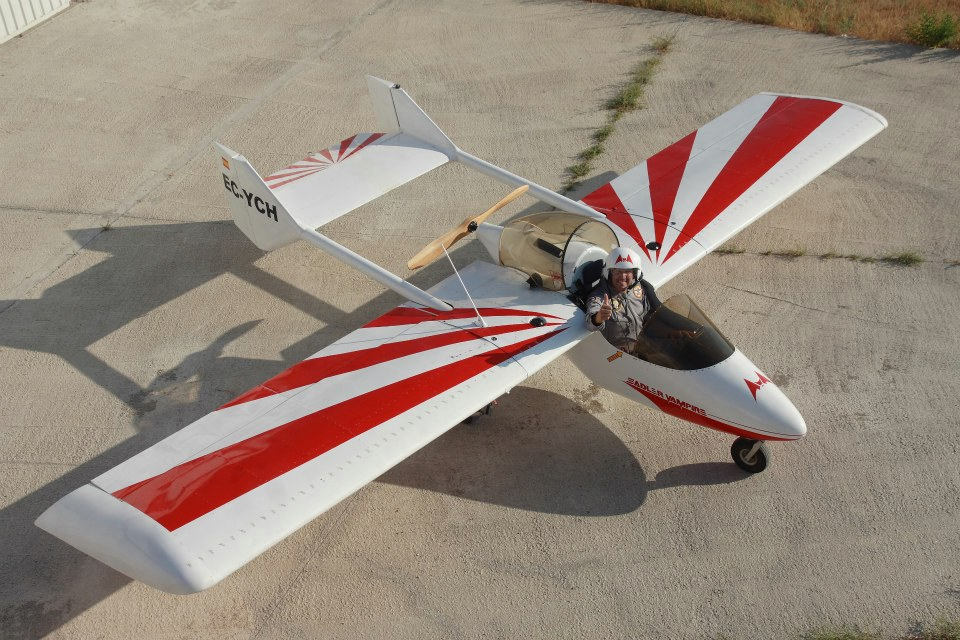
- Sadler in a Sadler Vampire
- Born: 3 September 1931; St. Catharines, Ontario, Canada
- Died: 5 April 2022 (aged 90); Cathedral City, California, U.S.
- Occupations: Race car designer; Racing driver; Electronics engineer; Aviation designer

William George Sadler (3 September 1931 – 5 April 2022) designed, built, and drove his own sports racing cars, some of which anticipated the later Formula 5000 and Can-Am cars. He left racing and earned a masters of electrical and electronics engineering, then went on to design and build light aircraft and aircraft engines, and was involved in the early development of unmanned aerial vehicles (UAVs).

== Biography ==
Sadler was born in St. Catharines, Ontario on 3 September 1931 to George and Bertha Sadler. His father ran Sadler's Auto Electric. The company was the Canadian agent for Lucas of Britain. Sadler's early hobbies included photography and ham radio. He dropped out of St. Catharines Collegiate High School to work full-time for his father. At eighteen he was given the job of opening a branch of Sadler's Auto Electric in Hamilton, Ontario.

Sadler was hired by Canadian Westinghouse in Hamilton, where he stayed for five years, becoming a guided missile technician. His specialty was the "Velvet Glove" missile for the Royal Canadian Air Force's CF-104 squadron. While at Westinghouse he was granted a patent on a design for a microwave test apparatus.

In 1953, while honeymooning in England, with travel expenses paid for by Lucas, Sadler saw his first sports car race, which sparked his interest in the sport. He began racing cars when he returned to Canada. After racing a few modified production cars, he began building his first Special one year later.

In the autumn of 1956 Sadler quit Westinghouse and moved with wife Anne and their two daughters, Susan and Catherine, to England to work for John Tojeiro for one year. Sadler's second home-built Special accompanied the family overseas. While in England the family lived in a trailer in Tojeiro's yard. At the Tojeiro Car Company, he was responsible for the design, pattern making, and finishing machine work for two of Tojeiro's new racing cars.

Sadler became an associate member of the Society of Automotive Engineers. He served as Technical editor for Canada Track & Traffic magazine, contributing an article to the debut issue of September 1959. He left that position near the end of 1961.

He started the Sadler Car Company in the spring of 1959 with a loan from his parents and access to Sadler's Electric's machine shop, including their dynamometer. The company's core staff would eventually include body fabricator Mike Saggers, welder Harry Ross, and mechanic Chuck Richardson. Over the course of a few short years Sadler produced a series of sports racing cars, open-wheeled Formula Junior and Formula Libre cars, and go-karts. He built the first rear mid-engine road-racing special, and proved that this configuration was competitive.

At one event, the team's sponsor overruled Sadler's decision that a car was not ready to race. Sadler's place in the cockpit was taken by another driver, and the car went out, overturning on lap two. Shortly after this Sadler announced his withdrawal from racing and car building.

After leaving auto racing Sadler first returned to Westinghouse. He then enrolled at Indiana Tri-State College, where he earned a degree in Electronics Engineering in just two years. From there he moved to the Massachusetts Institute of Technology (MIT), which he attended on a full scholarship. While between colleges he earned his pilot's license. He graduated from MIT in two semesters with a master's degree in Electrical and Electronics Engineering and went to work for General Dynamics, where he managed the Advanced Development Lab in San Diego. Among the projects he was involved with at General Dynamics were the Forward Looking Light Attack Radar (FLLAR), and the Alerting Long-Range Airborne Radar for MTI (ALARM).

== Cars ==
=== non-Sadler Car Company cars ===
One of Sadler's earliest cars was a 1939 American Bantam panel truck that had been Sadler's Auto Electric's delivery vehicle. Sadler completely rebuilt the truck and engine, added a column shift of his own design, and converted it into a convertible with a soft top that he sewed himself.

Sadler did one track outing in the MG TD that he and wife Anne were given as a wedding present by Sadler's father.

The first car he campaigned seriously was a 1949 Hillman Minx. Sadler replaced the car's original four-cylinder engine with a Ford V8-60 flathead V8.

Sadler raced a Singer Sports in 1954. He also made a few appearances in a Triumph TR2 as driver for Southam Sales and Service in 1955 and 1956.

Sadler bought Jaguar D-Type XKD 545 after the car suffered a crash in 1960 at Watkins Glen. He rebuilt it and raced the car at least twice. He later sold it, at one point offering to sell it to Brock Yates for $2000.00. It appears that it was eventually sold to John Cannon.

=== Sadler Mk.1 ===
Sadler built his first special, the Mk.1, over the winter of 1953–54. He made a multi-tubular chassis of 2.5 in (64 mm) mild steel for it.

Much of the car's running gear and original powertrain came from a Jowett Javelin sedan. The front suspension was independent, with longitudinal torsion bar springs. At the rear was the Jowett's live axle, also suspended on torsion bars. Sadler changed the final drive ratio by using a set of 4.11:1 gears from a Studebaker. The steering system used a rack-and-pinion from a Morris Minor installed upside down, with Morris tie rods and Jowett steering arms, and gave two turns lock-to-lock.

Power came from the 1,486 cc (90.7 cu in) Jowett overhead valve (OHV) flat-four engine fitted with a reground camshaft, dual valve springs with competition Jowett outer springs and Austin Healey inner springs, Jupiter R1 pistons, and a lightened flywheel. The Jowett's transmission was also used.

The car debuted in 1954 at Watkins Glenn, fitted with simple aluminum torpedo bodywork and cycle fenders. In January 1955 work started on a new enveloping fiberglass body. During the winter of 1955–56 the Jowett engine and transmission were replaced with a 1,991 cc (121.5 cu in) Standard wet liner inline-four engine from a Triumph TR2, and Triumph four-speed transmission. Sadler designed and built his own custom fuel injection system for this engine.

The Triumph engine threw a rod at the Harewood Acres circuit on 4 August. Sadler replaced the damaged four-cylinder with a Canadian-built 1956 Chevrolet small-block V8 displacing 265 cu in (4.3 L) and making 200 hp (149.1 kW) with dual four-barrel carburetors. The TR2 flywheel, clutch, bell housing, and transmission were carried over, and an adapter was made to mate the engine to the bellhousing. Sadler also built a new rear suspension that replaced the original Panhard rod with a custom frame to reduce wheelspin. The final drive ratio was changed to 3.54:1

=== Sadler Mk.2 ===
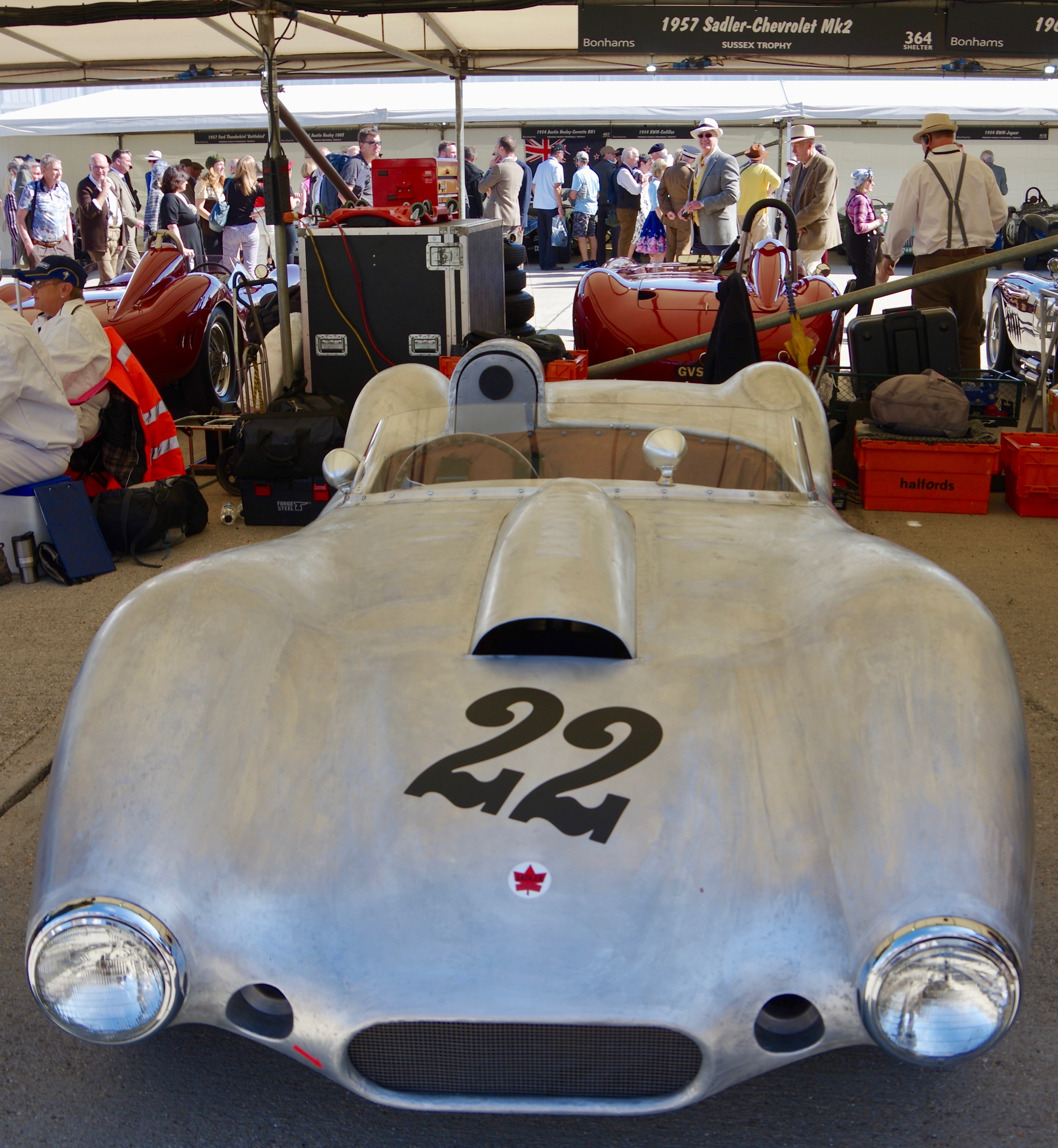
1957 Sadler Mk.2

Wheelspin continued to be a problem with the Mk.1, and Sadler felt that an independent rear suspension (IRS) was the solution. He was already planning to race the car overseas, so it would have to comply with new rules enacted by the Fédération Internationale de l'Automobile (FIA) dictating certain basic dimensions. He had also acquired a 1934 ENV preselector gearbox. To add the IRS, accommodate the new transmission, and comply with FIA rules, he decided that a new chassis was needed, and this led to the Mk.2 being built.

Using the ENV preselector allowed the car to dispense with clutch, pressure plate, and flywheel. The gearbox was mounted at the rear of the car. With this close-ratio 4-speed unit, the next gear could be selected at any time, and the shift triggered by cycling the clutch pedal.

For the Mk.2, Sadler laid out a ladder chassis with main tubes of 3.5 in (89 mm) diameter chromoly steel. It was sized so that the cockpit would be 47 in (1,194 mm) wide, as required by the FIA. The Jowett kingpins and upper wishbones were carried over from the Mk.1, as was the Morris Minor steering rack, although in the Mk.2 the rack was moved forward. The front torsion bar springs used in the Mk.1 were replaced by a lower transverse leaf spring. Initially the drum brakes and wire wheels were Austin-Healey pieces.

The rear suspension was Sadler's original design. He took the rear axle from a 1940 Ford V8 and cut the axle tubes cut off, then machined the housing sides to accept roller bearings and adapter plates. Spicer 1310 U-joints from a 1950 Canadian Chrysler were adapted to fit modified GMC 3 ton truck propeller shaft sections with splines, that then mated with Spicer 1350 U-joints that in turn attached to the axle stubs. The rear wheels were located by two long A-arms, and the wheels suspended by a transverse leaf made to Sadler's specifications.

The car underwent several updates. The original 265 CID V8 was later replaced with a 283 cu in (4.6 L) Canadian-built version of the 1957 Corvette engine fitted with a Duntov cam, lightened valves, a Delco dual-point distributor, and a trio of two-barrel carburetors in place of the original dual four-barrels. The engine was bored out to 300 cu in (4.9 L). After returning from England, Sadler replaced the Healey front drum brakes with Triumph discs and installed a new body. Rear radius rods were also added later, as were front lower A-arms and Armstrong springs and shock absorbers.

Sadler's 1958 win at Watkins Glen in the Mk.2 caught the attention of Earl G. Nisonger, president of the Nisonger Corporation, an auto parts supply company and British parts importer handling Smiths products. Nisonger convinced Sadler to replace the used running gear on the Mk.2 with new parts, and hired Bob Said to drive the car.

=== Sadler Mk.3 ===
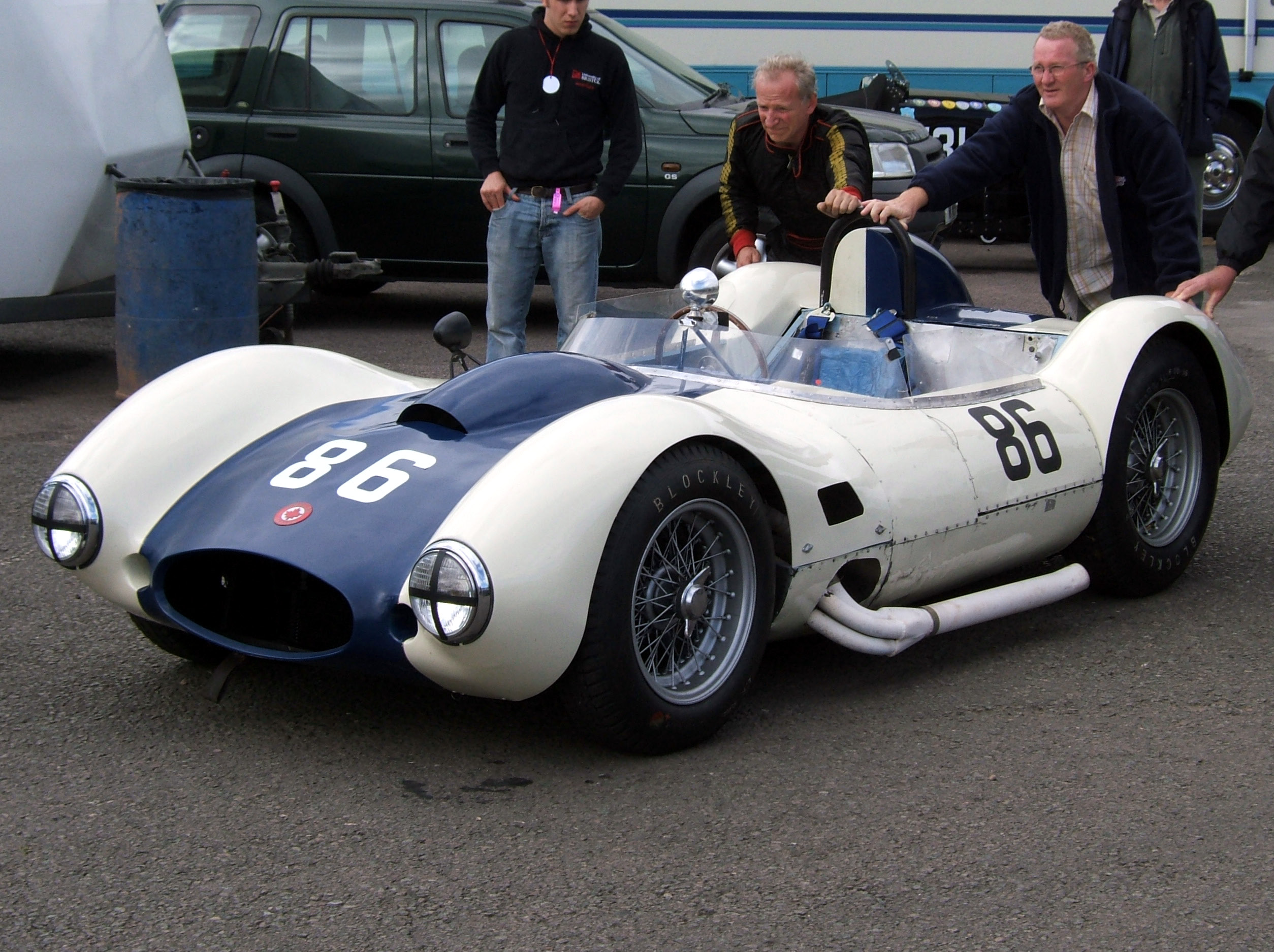
Sadler Mk.3 at Donington Park

After the updates to the Mk.2 were completed, Nisonger commissioned Sadler to build a completely new car that he would also sponsor for the 1959 racing season.

The Sadler Mk.3 that resulted was smaller, lower, and lighter than Sadler's earlier designs, with a more powerful engine. The first car was built over the course of seven weeks, for a cost of $10,000. The Mk.3 had a wheelbase of 86 in (2,184 mm) and tracks of 53.5 in (1,359 mm) in front and 51 in (1,295 mm) in back. The car weighed 1,650 lb (748.4 kg).

Instead of a Mk.2 style ladder chassis of large-diameter tubes, the Mk.3 had a space frame of square-section seamless chromoly tubing. In front was an upper and lower A-arm suspension with coil springs over Koni shock absorbers. In back Sadler installed a low-pivot swing axle with trailing arms. A Girling disc brake with aluminum caliper was at each wheel. Steering was by rack-and-pinion, and the differential was a Halibrand quick change unit.

The car's engine was a 283 CID block bored and stroked out to 327 cu in (5.4 L), with a compression ratio of 11:1, a Racer Brown "Super-Torque #2" camshaft, and Hilborn fuel injection. Power output was 340 bhp (253.5 kW). The transmission was a BorgWarner T-10 four-speed, and both engine and transmission were offset to the left.

The car that Nisonger sponsored raced as the Nisonger KLG Special, named for the KLG sparkplug line that the Smiths Group had bought from Kenelm Lee Guinness. Drivers were Sadler, Paul O'Shea, and Bruce Kessler.

A total of eight Mk.3s were built in 1959. Years later Sadler built a new Mk.3, largely out of spare parts, which he campaigned in vintage races.

=== Sadler-Meyer Special ===
John van Meyer owned a cycle-fendered Special built for prewar road racing that he campaigned in early SCCA road races and hillclimbs. The car started with a Ford Flathead V8, which was first replaced by a Cadillac engine, and later with a Pontiac V8.

In 1958 Meyer approached Sadler to have him update the car and return it to competitive form. Sadler carried over the Pontiac V8, Borrani wire wheels and De Dion tube rear suspension from Meyer's old roadster, but fabricated a new ladder chassis and added an enveloping body. The car was completed in 1959.

The Sadler-Meyer carried Meyer to his second New York State Hillclimb Championship in 1959, and set fastest time-of-day at the Giants Despair Hillclimb in 1960, 1961 and 1962. Meyer eventually sold the Sadler-Meyer and moved on to other cars.

The Sadler-Meyer has been restored twice; once in the 1980s by owner Robert Fernando, after which it appeared in historic racing events, and again in 2008, this time with input from Sadler. Over the years the car's body was revised, with changes that include enclosed side pipes, Plexiglas side curtains, a recontoured radiator opening and extended nose, and a clear cover over the engine intake that replaced the original prominent scoop.

In its current state the car is powered by what started out as a 283 cu in (4.6 L) small-block Chevrolet V8 stroked out to 339 cu in (5.6 L). The intake is an Offenhauser manifold and six Stromberg 97 carburetors. Engine output was measured to be 425 hp (316.9 kW) at 6500 rpm. Other features include a BorgWarner T10 4-speed transmission, Halibrand quick change differential, solid rotor front disc brakes, inboard rear drums, and Halibrand centerlock wheels.

The car was raced in the 2009 Colorado Grand and then shown at the Greenwich Concours d’Elegance.

=== Sadler Mk.4 ===
Just a single Mk.4 was built. It was a simplified version of the Mk.3, with a live axle in place of the earlier car's IRS. The car was built for David Greenblatt. At some point the engine received a Latham supercharger.

Racing sponsorship was provided by Gorries Downtown Chevrolet Oldsmobile, a car dealership in Toronto that billed itself as "Canada's Corvette Headquarters". The Mk.4 was raced as the "Gorries Sadler Corvette". Greenblatt won the 1960 Quebec Drivers Championship in the car.

Greenblatt later partnered with Luigi Cassiani to launch their own line of cars called the Dailu. The Sadler Mk.4 influenced their first car, the Dailu MK I. The degree of influence is described as ranging from providing the concept, to the frame design, up to the Dailu MK I being a rebody of the Sadler. The Dailu MK I adapted an IRS from a 1961 Jaguar XK-E.

=== Formula Junior ===
Sadler built a series of twelve Formula Junior race cars, six of which are said to survive.

The car was a front-engine design with a steel tubular chassis. The aluminum skin was stressed. Many of the mechanical components used, including the engine, transmission, and axle, were British Motor Corporation (BMC) parts from their Austin-Healey Sprite model. List price was $2,995 complete.

=== Sadler Sportkart ===
Sadler built a line of go-karts called the Sadler Sportkart. The product served as a time-filler between work on the larger racing cars.

Engine options ranged from a 2.2 hp (1.6 kW) single engine kart up to a 15 hp (11.2 kW) dual engine, with the 2.2 hp model priced at $185.50 and the 15 hp model costing $350. Drive for the single, offset engine model went to the nearest rear wheel, with power taken to the opposite side by a driveshaft. A total of 30 karts were built.

Production of the Sportkart ended in 1961.

=== Sadler Formula 3 ===
Sadler built a single Formula Three open wheel racer for a client in Buffalo, New York. Braking was provided by two Al-fin drum brakes in front and just a single one in the rear. Powering the car was a 649 cc (39.6 cu in) parallel twin engine as used in the Triumph Tiger. The car is said to still exist.

=== Sadler Formula Libre ===
Sadler built two Formula Libre cars, one with the engine in the front and one with the engine in back.

His first attempt was essentially a front-engined Formula Junior car with a Chevrolet V8 shoehorned into it, which did not leave room for a clutch or a gearbox. Having the engine connected directly to the car's differential meant that when the engine was running the car was moving, and it would stall if its speed dropped too low. This car was never raced.

Sadler's next Formula Libre used the brakes and front suspension from the earlier car in a new chassis with a 301 cu in (4.9 L) Chevrolet V8 mounted behind the driver. This car had a clutch, but no gearbox, and so had only one forward speed. The engine was tuned to have a wide powerband.It was nicknamed the "Formula Ferocious".

This was the first time that a Chevrolet small-block V8 was installed in a modern rear-engined racing car. Its pioneering use of a mid-mounted domestic V8 engine set the pattern for future F-5000 cars.

The car debuted at the 1960 Formula Libre race at Watkins Glen, where it was driven by Peter Ryan. It ran as high as fifth place until the engine failed. The Formula Ferocious was retired, then later restored for vintage racing.

=== Sadler Mk.5 ===
Two Sadler Mk.5s were built in 1960 for the 1961 season. The cars were sponsored by the Canadian Comstock Company, with the racing program under the auspices of Comstock Vice president Charles I. Rathgeb Junior. The cars were originally raced as Comstock-Sadlers.

Sadler laid out a space frame chassis for the Mk.5, and used aluminum bodywork with flop-down doors. The front suspension used Healey parts, and a rack-and-pinion steering rack from a Morris Minor. Brakes were Girling discs, outboard from an Austin-Healey in front, and inboard from an MGA in back, with coil-over dampers also from Girling. The resulting cars had a wheelbase of 90 in (2,286 mm), front and rear tracks of 50 and 48 in (1,270 and 1,219 mm) respectively, and a dry weight of 1,475 lb (669.0 kg).

Power came from a Chevrolet small-block V8. The cars' first engine was a 283 CID V8 bored and stroked to 327 cu in (5.4 L). Later a small-block enlarged to 364 cu in (6.0 L) was installed, with a compression ratio of 13:1 or 14:1. Cadillac connecting rods were installed, and large valves. Claimed horsepower for this larger engine was 370 bhp (275.9 kW).

In both cases the engine was mounted behind the driver, making the Sadler Mk.5 the first mid-engined sports-racing car powered by a small block Chevy V8 engine.

The Mk.5 had two forward speeds. Sadler built a two-speed transaxle out of a Halibrand quick-change differential with a rear housing extended to accommodate another set of gears, and used Ford synchronizers. The shift pattern was low-neutral-high.

One month after the Mk.5s debuted Sadler closed down his company and left auto racing.

After a disappointing season, and facing difficulty sourcing a replacement transaxle, the Comstock team replaced the Sadler Mk.5 with a new front-engined sports racer with a chassis designed by Dick Syson, who was also Sadler's successor as Technical Editor of Canada Track & Traffic. The new car was the Comstock EXP.

Veedol Motor Oil later sponsored a Mk.5, which was renamed either "Miss Veedol" or the "Veedol Special".

A Mk.5 was purchased by Peter Broeker and converted into the Stebro Mark III by having its wheelbase stretched by 8 in (203 mm) and a conventional transaxle substituted for the two speed modified Halibrand differential.

One Mk.5 was ultimately destroyed in a fire. The remains of the other car, originally driven by Nat Adams, were later bought by Jack Boxstrom and restored. After many years Boxstrom sold the car to a new owner in England. It remains involved in vintage racing.

=== Formula Super Vee ===
In 1972 Sadler built a Formula Super Vee racer for his personal use.

== Aircraft ==
While living in Scottsdale, Arizona, Sadler was a distributor of the Lazair ultralight sold by Ultra Flight Sales.

In 1982 he took an ultralight of his own design to the EAA AirVenture Oshkosh show, where it won the Grand Champion Award.

In 1984 he was one of the founders of the Light Aircraft Manufacturers Association.

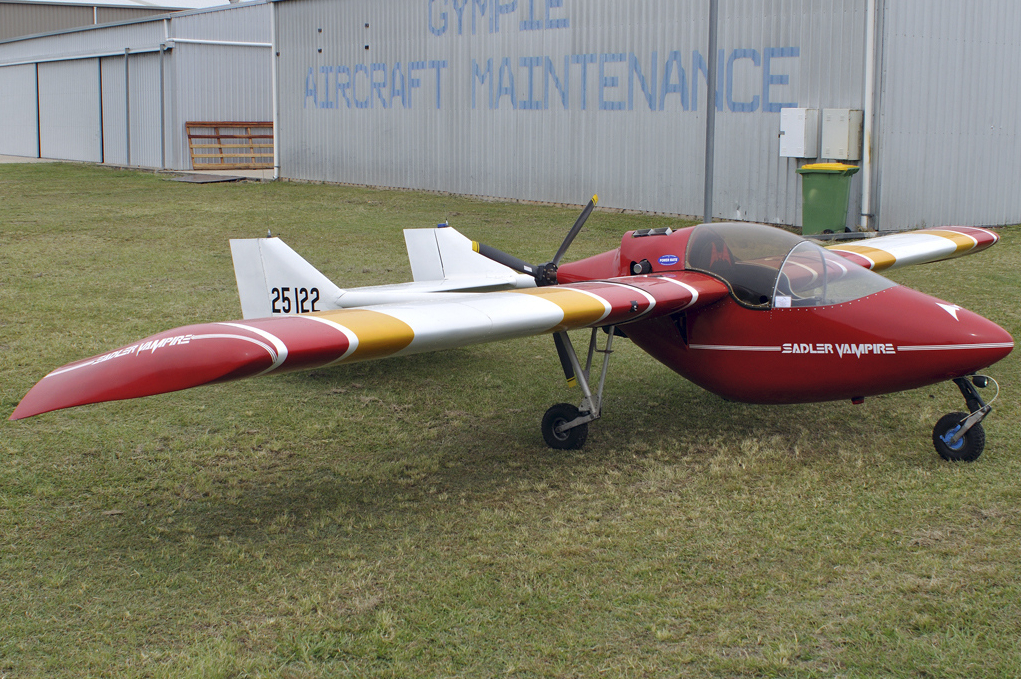
Sadler Vampire

1984 was also when Sadler established the American Microflight company, later renamed the Sadler Aircraft Corporation, and put his 1982 ultralight design into production as the Sadler Vampire. The Vampire was a mid-wing, twin-boom, ultralight aircraft with a single engine in a pusher configuration and a 30 ft (9.1 m) wingspan. The design referenced the de Havilland Vampire. The wings could be double folded, allowing the plane to be trailered easily.

Twenty-eight copies of the Vampire were built by Sadler's companies. The design was licensed to Skywise Ultraflight in Australia, who produced the SV-1, SV-2, SV-2A, and SV-3 models, with a wingspan reduced to 22 ft (6.7 m) and a variety of available engines. Skywise built an additional thirty copies of the Vampire. Production rights later passed, by way of Aero. V. Australia, to Garland Aerospace Pty Ltd., who produced three variations: the GA-1, GA-2, and GA-3.

In 1985 Sadler began a search for a small aircraft engine. That search eventually led to his designing a radial aircraft engine of his own that was developed for production by Bill Gewald. The men formed Sadler Radial Engines Inc. to produce and sell the engine. The design was assigned U.S. patent 5,150,670A. The Sadler R1765U was a four-stroke, six cylinder engine with two radial banks of three cylinders each. The pistons and cylinder barrels were Volkswagen parts. The engine had a dual electronic ignition firing two sparkplugs per cylinder. This direct drive engine was 20.5 in (521 mm) wide, 19.4 in (493 mm) high, and approximately 17 in (432 mm) long, depending on configuration. Power output was 65 hp (48.5 kW), and weight was 121.4 lb (55.1 kg) for the basic engine and 162 lb (73.5 kg) when the engine mount, exhaust manifold, and propeller were included. Forty-three prototype engines were built, but none were sold, as the company had difficulty providing parts for service. Rights to the original 1,721 cc (105.0 cu in) model engine were bought by SCI Aviation. SCI produced the 2.2 L (134 cu in) R6-80 and 3.2 L (195 cu in) R6-150.

In June 1987 Sadler signed a contract with General Atomics to convert his plane into a unmanned drone, later badged as a "Predator", with a computerized, GPS based autopilot. The earliest versions had a pilot on board, usually Sadler himself. The vehicle developed was the GA UAV 18–50. The aircraft was successfully demonstrated to American Missile Command late in 1988.

A piloted militarized version of the Vampire was also built; the model A-22 Piranha Light Attack and Surveillance Aircraft (LASA).

Engines considered for the Piranha were the Volkswagen air-cooled engine and a water-cooled automobile V6 engine from Chevrolet. The engine finally chosen was an aluminum block Chevrolet small-block V8 developing an estimated 450 hp (335.6 kW). The Piranha came equipped with a ballistically deployed parachute capable of lowering pilot and aircraft together safely to the ground. The tub was reinforced with Kevlar to protect the pilot from light arms fire. The aircraft provided up to four hard points for mounting armaments and ordnance, including a McDonnell Douglas/Boeing (MDHC) M230LF 30 mm cannon, M60 type 7.62 mm machine guns, 7-shot rocket launching pods for 70 mm MK66, MK4 or MK40 rockets, LAU-32 rocket pods, MK81 general purpose low-drag bombs, MK122 Fireye fire bombs, an SUU-11 7.62 mm minigun pod, or an XM13 grenade launcher. The Piranha weighed 1,450 lb (657.7 kg) and had a vertical climb rate of greater than 4000 fpm (20.32 m/s).

Republic of Turkey Adventure with Turkish Aerospace Industries (TAI/ later named as TUSAŞ)

In 1997 Sadler Aircraft Corp. partnered with Türk Havacılık ve Uzay Sanayii A.Ş. (TUSAŞ — Turkish Aerospace Industries Inc.) to adapt the Piranha for the Turkish military, resulting in the TG-X1 Bat. This very light single-seat attack and surveillance aircraft made its debut flight in February 1997. Chevy V8 engine was installed with titanium conrods. The vision of pilot was excellent and performance was superior to helicopters with a fraction of the cost. Aircraft has foldable wings and can take-off from unprepared runways. Prototype aircraft was crash landed in one of the flight tests due to engine failure. Sadler due to low altitude tried to land the aircraft to the runway that he took off. He survived with minor injuries. Aircraft was fixed and flew many more test flights. McDonnell Douglas/Boeing (MDHC) M230LF 30 mm cannon (This cannon is used on AH-64 Apache attack helicopters) was brought to the prototype shop but never installed on TG-X1. Project was cancelled due to lack of interest from military. Members of the design team remember him as a sharp, mission focused, bold pilot and as a practical engineer. One and only prototype aircraft is still intact and kept in TUSAŞ perimeter.

Sadler later designed a two-seat Light-sport aircraft (LSA) called the Vampire 2 that was first shown at the 2009 AirVenture Oshkosh. Power came from a Jabiru 3300 making 120 hp (89.5 kW). The first prototype was destroyed in a fire in 2008. Ron Fisher later obtained the surviving prototype with the intent of having it certified and go into production as the Fisher Kingfisher.

== Instrumentation ==
In the early 2000s Sadler was Director of engineering at Arizona Instrument LLC. While there he received two patents for continuous flow moisture analyzers.

== Personal life ==
Sadler was a member of Mensa International.

Sadler died in Cathedral City, California on 5 April 2022. He was survived by wife Anne, ex-wife Linda, and daughters Sue, Cate, and Vicki.

== Racing history ==
- First place
  - 21 October 1956 at Watkins Glen, in Sadler Mk.2
  - 1 June 1958 in SCCA Regional at Dunkirk, in Sadler Mk.2
  - 27 June 1958 in SCCA Regional at Watkins Glen, in Sadler Mk.2
  - 30 May 1959 in LASC Formula Libre at Green Acres, in Sadler Mk.3
  - 30 May 1959 in LASC Modified 1.5 class at Green Acres, in Sadler Mk.3
  - 18 June 1960 in BEMC Modified +1.5 class at Harewood Acres, in Sadler Mk.4
- Second place
  - 8 August 1953 in S3.0 class at Edenvale, in Hillman Minx V8
  - 16 June 1956 in S2.0 class at Harewood Acres, in Sadler Mk.1
  - 19 July 1958 in Modified +1.5 class at Harewood Acres, CM class win, in Sadler Mk.2
  - 9 July 1961 in MMGCC Main race at St. Eugene, in Sadler Mk.5
- Third place
  - 16 June 1956 in GP at Harewood Acres, in Sadler Mk.1
  - 22 September 1957 in NSCC S+1.5 class as Mallory Park, in Sadler Mk.2
  - 5 October 1957 in Formula Libre at National Silverstone, in Sadler Mk.2
  - 31 August 1958 in Preliminary at Thompson, in Sadler Mk.2
  - 1 September 1958 in SCCA National at Thompson, in Sadler Mk.2
- Other class wins
  - 7 September 1958 set Best Time of Day at the Brighton Speed Trials. His prize was a cheque for £100 that he invested in aluminum body panels.
  - 17 May 1959 in SCCA National at Cumberland, BM class win, eighth overall, in Sadler Mk.3
  - 3 December 1960 in Governor's Trophy at 7th Annual International Bahamas Speed Weeks, C class win, fifth overall, in Sadler Mk.3

== Honours ==
- Inducted into the Canadian Motorsports Hall of Fame in 1993. Sadler was honoured as Canada's most successful racing car builder, and for his influence on the development of later Group 7 and Can-Am cars.
- Inducted into the St. Catharines Sports Hall of Fame in 1998.
- Guest of Honor at the Gold Cup Historics, held 5–8 June 2003.
- Inducted into the Watkins Glen Drivers Walk of Fame in 2004.
- Appeared at the Monterey Historics in 2014, where he won the "Spirit of Excellence Award" in the Formula Junior class. At Portland that same year Sadler won the "Spirit of Vintage Racing".
