= Rieden, Rhineland-Palatinate =

Rieden
- Municipality
- Coat of arms

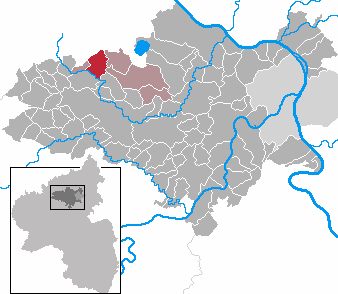
- Location of Rieden within Mayen-Koblenz district
- Interactive map of Rieden
- Location within Germany Location within Rhineland-Palatinate
- Coordinates: 50°23′49″N 7°10′48″E
- Country: Germany
- State: Rhineland-Palatinate
- District: Mayen-Koblenz
- Municipal assoc.: Mendig

Government
  - Mayor (2019–24): Andreas Doll

Area
  - Total: 9.1 km^{2} (3.5 sq mi)
- Elevation: 380 m (1,250 ft)

Population (2025-12-31)
  - Total: 1,214
  - Density: 130/km^{2} (350/sq mi)
- Time zone: UTC+01:00 (CET)
  - Summer (DST): UTC+02:00 (CEST)
- Postal codes: 56745
- Dialling codes: 02655
- Vehicle registration: MYK

Rieden (German pronunciation: [ˈʁiːdn̩]) is a municipality in the district of Mayen-Koblenz in Rhineland-Palatinate, western Germany.
