= Atlas World Group =

U.S. moving and storage company

Atlas World Group, Inc.
- Type: Private
- Industry: Moving and storage
- Founded: 1948; 78 years ago
- Headquarters: Evansville, Indiana, U.S.
- Key people: Jack Griffin (chairman & CEO)
- Website: atlasworldgroupinc.com

Atlas World Group, Inc. is an American privately held company in the moving and storage industry headquartered in Evansville, Indiana. Founded in 1948, Atlas is the 11th largest private company in the state. Atlas World Group is the parent and holding company of Atlas Van Lines, Inc., and eight other subsidiary companies that offer transportation, storage, and related relocation services on a global scale through its network of agents and service partners. Service areas include consumer relocation, corporate relocation, government and military services, international relocation, and logistics.

Atlas World Group's flagship company, Atlas Van Lines, is an agent-owned company and similar in form to a cooperative. It has approximately 500 agents in more than 140 countries. Among these agents, 75 own shares in Atlas World Group. Atlas Van Lines is the second-largest interstate motor carrier in the United States.

== History ==
Atlas traces its roots to 1948, when a group of 33 entrepreneurs formed a cooperative for interstate transportation of household goods. The group took the name "Atlas Van Lines" and opened a new headquarters building in Evansville, Indiana. The company changed ownership structure in the 1980s when it offered stock to the public. After a hostile takeover attempt, the company returned to ownership by its agents in 1988. Atlas expanded rapidly in the 1990s and established Atlas World Group as the holding company for Atlas Van Lines, Inc., and seven subsidiaries.

In 1996 Atlas purchased Red Ball Corporation, the 13th largest household mover in the United States at the time, including its two subsidiaries: American Red Ball International, an international freight forwarder based in Seattle, Washington, and American Red Ball Transit Co. based in Indianapolis, Indiana. Red Ball specialized in the moves of US military personnel. In 2001, Atlas sold American Red Ball Transit, the domestic subsidiary, to its management.

In 1997 the company added Atlantic Relocation Systems (more than 600 vehicles) and Bekins Northwest (more than 250). In 2000, Atlas purchased a controlling interest in Cornerstone Relocation Group, a full service global relocation management company based in Basking Ridge, New Jersey, expanding global relocation services to corporate transportation clients.

In 2020, Atlas won a three-year contract from the United States Transportation Command valued at nearly $7.2 billion for all global relocation services for the United States Department of Defense and the United States Coast Guard service members, their families, and Department of Defense civilians.

== Subsidiaries ==
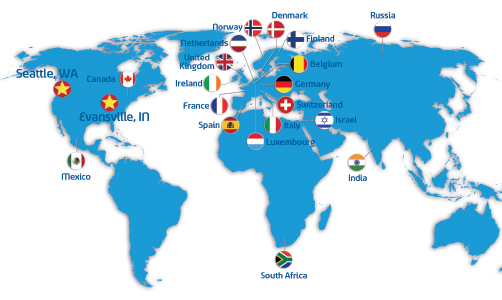

Atlas Van Lines, the Atlas World Group's flagship company, was founded by a group of 33 moving companies referred to as agents. Atlas is still distinguished by its agent ownership to this day and is represented by nearly 500 Atlas agents across the world. Atlas Van Lines is the second-largest carrier of household goods in the United States. The moving company is headquartered in Evansville, Indiana.

Atlas Van Lines Canada is the cross-border sister company of Atlas Van Lines in full operation since 1963. Headquartered in Oakville, Ontario, there are 150 agents throughout Canada.

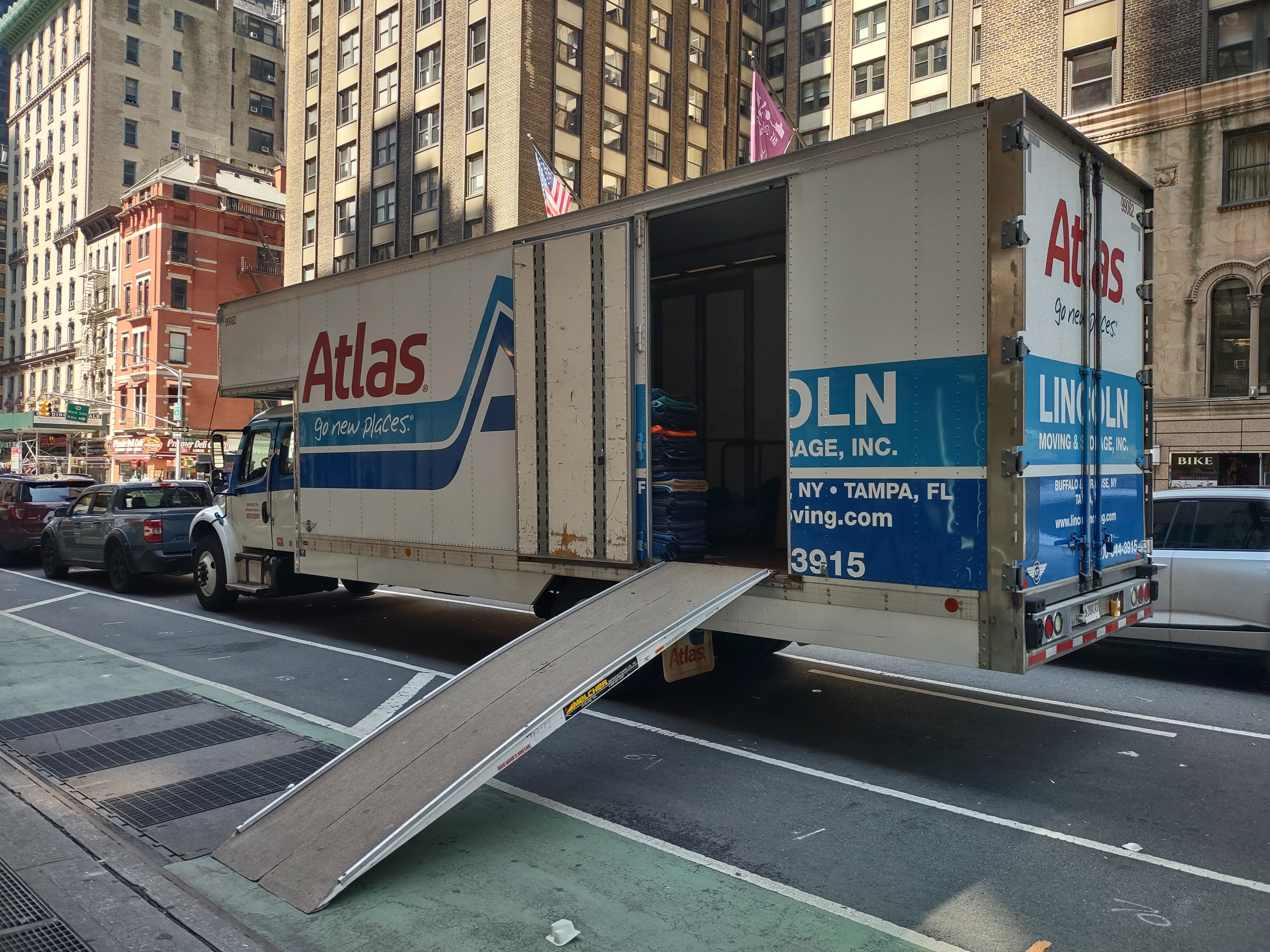
An Atlas Van Lines Truck in New York City

In Seattle, Washington, Atlas Van Lines International, Inc., handles international relocations for corporate professionals, military service members, government personnel, as well as their families. In 2015, the company was shortlisted for Best International Moving Company of the Year by the U.S. Expatriate Management and Mobility Awards.

Atlas Logistics, Inc., in Evansville is the commercial logistics arm of Atlas World Group. In operation since 1970, Atlas Logistics provides supply chain management, freight brokerage, padded van transportation, and project management with a specialization in retail, hospitality, healthcare, and fine art industries. Titan Global Distribution handles project management out of St. Louis, Missouri.

Avail Move Management in Evansville, formed in 2003, focuses on third-party relocation management services. Other subsidiaries include Cornerstone Relocation Group, Atlas Terminal Company, and Atlas World-Class Travel.
