= Bell, Mayen-Koblenz =

Bell
- Municipality
- Coat of arms

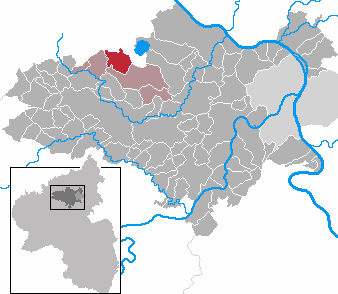
- Location of Bell within Mayen-Koblenz district
- Interactive map of Bell
- Location within Germany Location within Rhineland-Palatinate
- Coordinates: 50°23′25″N 07°14′05″E
- Country: Germany
- State: Rhineland-Palatinate
- District: Mayen-Koblenz
- Municipal assoc.: Mendig

Government
  - Mayor (2019–24): Stefan Zepp

Area
  - Total: 10.26 km^{2} (3.96 sq mi)
- Elevation: 370 m (1,210 ft)

Population (2025-12-31)
  - Total: 1,340
  - Density: 131/km^{2} (338/sq mi)
- Time zone: UTC+01:00 (CET)
  - Summer (DST): UTC+02:00 (CEST)
- Postal codes: 56745
- Dialling codes: 02652
- Vehicle registration: MYK
- Website: www.bell-eifel.de

Bell (German pronunciation: [bɛl]) is a municipality in the district of Mayen-Koblenz in Rhineland-Palatinate, western Germany.
