= Evansville Freedom Festival =

The Evansville Freedom Festival was an annual festival in Evansville, Indiana that celebrates the Fourth of July. What began in 1970 with only a handful of events has grown to include unlimited boat racing, airshows, food booths, dances, and music culminating with a fireworks show over the Evansville riverfront.

From 1979 to 2008, the Thunder on the Ohio hydroplane races had been the signature event of the Evansville Freedom Festival. Thunder was typically the first official race of the American Boat Racing Association season. In 2009, Thunder on the Ohio broke away from Evansville's Freedom Festival and moved to the end of August as a stand-alone event. Thunder still draws boats and drivers from all over the country as well as some local favorites.

The United States Navy's Blue Angels have been an added attraction in recent years. The Blue Angels were part of the Freedom Festival's air show in both 2001 and 2005.

In 2011, the Freedom Festival became the ShrinersFest, as it is now run by the local Hadi Temple.

== See also ==
- List of festivals in the United States
