= Halibrand =

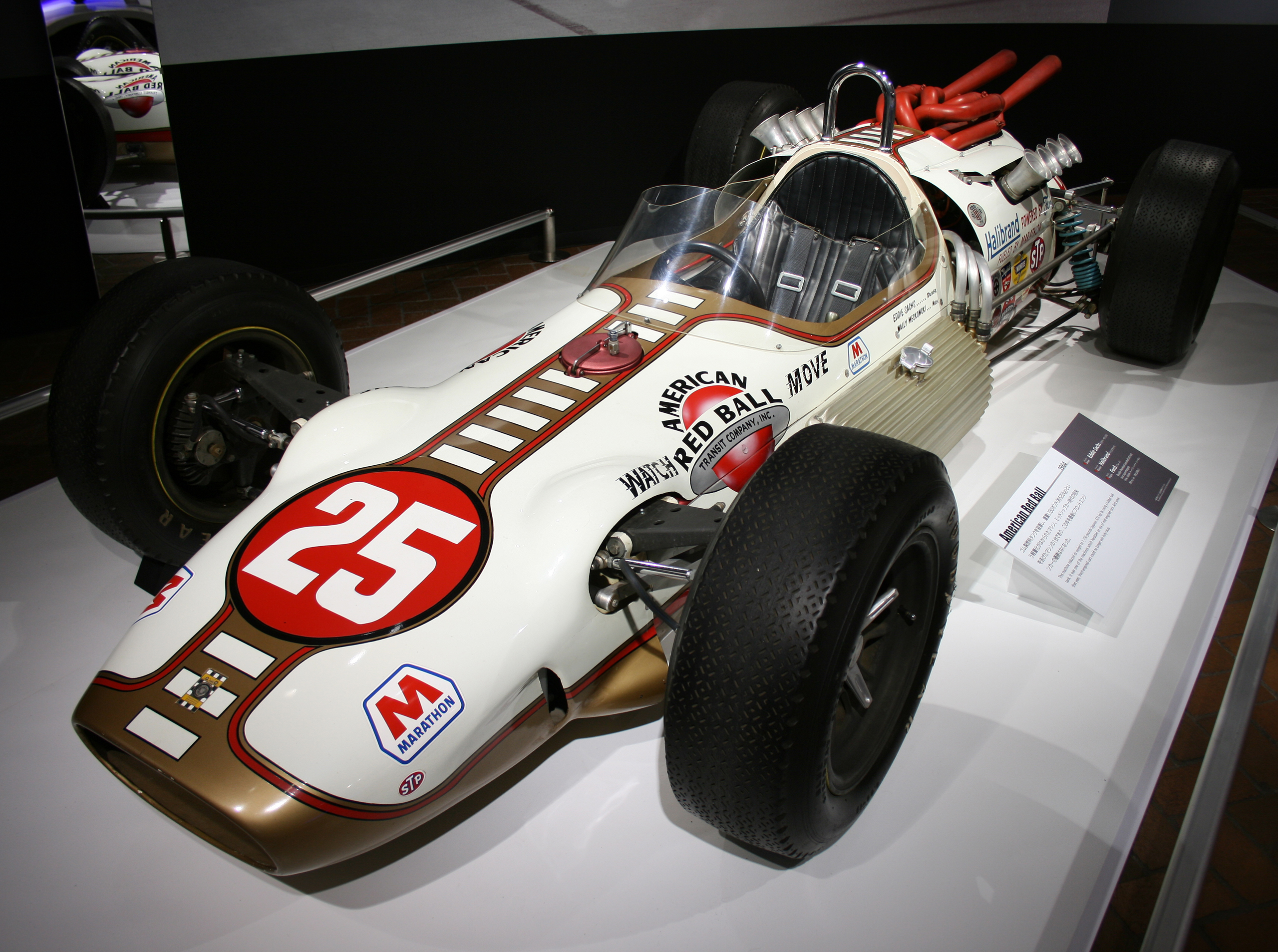
Eddie Sachs' American Red Ball Special Halibrand Shrike-Ford from the 1964 Indianapolis 500

Halibrand is an American maker of racing wheels and quick-change rearend housings.

Halibrand started in Culver City, California in 1946. Its first product was a magnesium wheel for Indy cars, as a replacement for the wire wheels then commonplace. The slotted design favored by hot rodders is based on a sprint car design from the 1950s.

== Sources ==
- Shelton, Chris. "Then, Now, and Forever" in Hot Rod, March 2017, pp. 16–29.
- Taylor, Thom. "Beauty Beyond the Twilight Zone" in Hot Rod, April 2017, pp. 30–43.
