= Mendig =

- Town
- Coat of arms

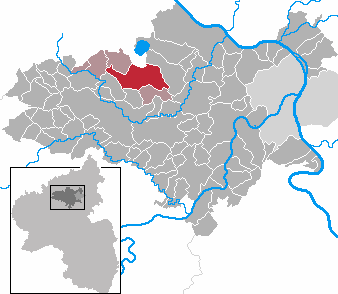
- Location of Mendig within Mayen-Koblenz district
- Interactive map of Mendig
- Location within Germany Location within Rhineland-Palatinate
- Coordinates: 50°22′28″N 7°16′51″E
- Country: Germany
- State: Rhineland-Palatinate
- District: Mayen-Koblenz
- Municipal assoc.: Mendig

Government
  - Mayor (2019–24): Hans Peter Ammel (SPD)

Area
  - Total: 23.75 km^{2} (9.17 sq mi)
- Elevation: 220 m (720 ft)

Population (2025-12-31)
  - Total: 9,017
  - Density: 379.7/km^{2} (983.3/sq mi)
- Time zone: UTC+01:00 (CET)
  - Summer (DST): UTC+02:00 (CEST)
- Postal codes: 56743
- Dialling codes: 02652
- Vehicle registration: MYK, MY
- Website: www.stadt-mendig.de

Mendig (German: [ˈmɛndɪç]) is a small town in the district Mayen-Koblenz, in Rhineland-Palatinate, Germany. It is situated approximately 6 km north-east of Mayen, and 25 km west of Koblenz. Mendig is the seat of the Verbandsgemeinde ("collective municipality") Mendig.

The popular rockfestival Rock am Ring was held in Mendig in 2015 and 2016.

== Personalities ==
- Rosemarie Nitribitt (1932-1957), spent her childhood in foster care in the Mendig Kaplan-slip road
- Andrea Nahles (born 1970), politician, Member of Bundestag (SPD) and a former Minister for Labour and Social Affairs, was born in Mendig

== Transport ==
Mending station is located at the Cross Eifel Railway which is served by line RB23 (Limburg - Diez - Bad Ems - Koblenz - Andernach - Mayen) as well RB38 (Andernach - Mayen - Kaisersesch), both operated by section Lahn-Eifel-Bahn of Deutsche Bahn.

Mendig train station also has a park and ride parking lot for all users of public transport.
