= 2019 H1 Unlimited season =

2019 H1 Unlimited

Seasons
- ← 2018 2021 →

The 2019 H1 Unlimited season is the sixty-fourth running of the H1 Unlimited series for unlimited hydroplanes, sanctioned by the APBA.

== Teams and drivers ==
2019 Teams
No	Team	Engine	Owner	Driver
U-1	Delta Realtrac	Lycoming T-55/L-7 turbine	Lori and Mike Jones	Andrew Tate
U-3	Go3RacingṪ	Turbocharged V-12 Allison	Ed Cooper	Jimmy King
U-6	HomeStreet Bank	Lycoming T-55/L-7 turbine	City of Madison	Jimmy Shane
U-7	Spirit of Detroit Racing	Lycoming T-55/L-7 turbine	Dave Bartush	Bert Henderson / Patrick Haworth
U-11	J&Ds presented by Reliable Diamond Tool	Lycoming T-55/L-7 turbine	Shannon and Scott Raney	Tom Thompson / Jamie Nilsen
U-12	Graham Trucking	Lycoming T-55/L-7 turbine	Rob Graham	J. Michael Kelly
U-98	GT American Dream	Lycoming T-55/L-7 turbine	Rob Graham	Corey Peabody
U-99.9	Darrell Strong presents PayneWest Insurance	Lycoming T-55/L-7 turbine	Greg O’Farrell	Brian Perkins
U-440	Bucket List Racing	Lycoming T-53 turbine	Kelly Stocklin	Dustin Echols
U-1918	Oberto Specialty Meats	Lycoming T-55/L-7 turbine	City of Madison	Jeff Bernard

Note: Ṫ—The U-3 is the only piston powered boat in the fleet, powered by a dual turbocharged Allison V-12.

== Season schedule and results ==
2019 Season Schedule and Results
Race title	Location	Date	Winning boat	Winning driver
Guntersville Lake Hydrofest	Guntersville, Alabama	June 28–30	HomeStreet Bank	Jimmy Shane
APBA Gold Cup at the Madison Regatta	Ohio River, Madison, Indiana	July 5–7	HomeStreet Bank	Jimmy Shane
HAPO Columbia Cup	Columbia River, Tri-Cities, Washington	July 26–28	Graham Trucking	J. Michael Kelly
HomeStreet Bank Cup	Lake Washington, Seattle, Washington	August 2–4	Graham Trucking	J. Michael Kelly
San Diego Bayfair	Mission Bay, San Diego, California, California	September 13–15	Graham Trucking	J. Michael Kelly

== National High Points Standings ==
National High Points Results
No	Boat	Driver	Guntersville	Madison	Tri-Cities	Seattle	San Diego	Driver Total	Team Total
U-1	Delta Realtrac	Andrew Tate	—	1,447	1,705	1,205	—	4,357	4,357
U-3	Go3Racing	Jimmy King	—	—	630	—	—	630	630
U-6	HomeStreet Bank	Jimmy Shane	1,925	2,100	1,925	1,427	1,600	8.977	8,977
U-7	Spirit of Detroit Racing	Bert Henderson	1,175	1,444	1,186	593	557	4,955	5,124
U-7	Spirit of Detroit Racing	Patrick Haworth	—	—	—	—	169	169	5,124
U-11	J&Ds presented by Reliable Diamond Tool	Jamie Nilsen	—	—	356	1200	830	2,386	4,220
U-11	J&Ds presented by Reliable Diamond Tool	Tom Thompson	780	1,054	—	—	—	1,834	4,220
U-12	Graham Trucking	J. Michael Kelly	1,639	1,305	1,595	1,395	1,385	7,319	7,319
U-98	GT American Dream	Corey Peabody	955	994	880	632	167	3,628	3,628
U-99.9	Darrell Strong presents PayneWest Insurance	Brian Perkins	—	—	958	936	—	1,894	1,894
U-440	Bucket List Racing	Dustin Echols	1,073	790	326	—	—	2,189	2,189
U-1918	Oberto Specialty Meats	Jeff Bernard	—	—	1,238	854	1,120	3,212	3,212
