= 2015 H1 Unlimited season =

2015 H1 Unlimited

Seasons
- ← 2014 2016 →

The 2015 H1 Unlimited season is the sixtieth running of the H1 Unlimited series for unlimited hydroplanes, sanctioned by the APBA. It will be the first time since 2009 that the series will have no sanctioning from the UIM.

== Teams and drivers ==
In 2015, all boats used Lycoming Engines with the exception of the U-3 Go3Racing team which used an Allison V-12 engine and the U-18 Bucket List Racing team that used a smaller T-53 Lycoming turbine engine.

No	Engine	Team	Owner	Driver	Rounds
U-1	Lycoming T55	Oh Boy! Oberto	City of Madison	Jimmy Shane	All
U-3	Allison V-12	Go3Racing	Ed Cooper	Jimmy King	2
U-5	Lycoming T55	Graham Trucking I	Ted Porter	J. Michael Kelly	All
U-7	Lycoming T55	Graham Trucking II	Ted Porter	Jesse Robertson (R)	All
U-9	Lycoming T55	Red Dot/Les Schwab	Mike and Lori Jones	Scott Liddycoat	4
GBR11	Lycoming T55	Miss Peters & May	Scott and Shannon Raney	Tom Thompson	All
U-12	Lycoming T55	Miss Diljulio	Jay Leckrone and Denise Garl	Patrick Sankuer	All
U-18	Lycoming T53	Bucket List Racing	Kelly Stocklin	Kelly Stocklin	4
U-21	Lycoming T55	Lakeridge Paving	Greg and Brian O'Farrell	Brian Perkins	4
U-22	Lycoming T55	Webster Racing	Steve and Sue Webster	Mike Webster	4
U-27	Lycoming T55	Wiggins Racing	Milt and Charley Wiggins	Cal Phipps	4
U-96	Lycoming T55	Elam Plus	Erik Ellstrom	Jean Theoret	4
U-100	Lycoming T55	Leland Unlimited	Leland Unlimited	Kevin Eacret	4

== 2015 Season Summary ==
The 2015 season began with the 65th annual Madison Regatta held in Madison, IN on July 3–5. Race officials battled high waters and floating debris on the Ohio River the entire weekend. Because of debris, race officials opted for a series of two- and three-boat shootouts instead of the usual four-boat heat races. In the final — reduced from five laps to three — J. Michael Kelly, driving the U-5 Graham Trucking boat, won for the second straight year. The formatted Madison Regatta will not count toward the national points race.

The 2015 Coeur d’Alene Silver Cup, scheduled to be held on July 17–19, was cancelled in April.

The second race of the season (and the first official high points race) was the APBA Gold Cup held at Tri-Cities, WA on July 24–26. Jimmy Shane in the U-1 Oberto captured the 2015 Gold Cup Championship after officials checked the video and saw that Jean Theoret in the U-96 Ellstrom Elam Plus went into an area called the DMZ and was disqualified from the championship heat. In what looked to spectators like a battle for second and third between Shane and J. Michael Kelly in the U-5 Graham Trucking, Shane and Kelly battled deck-to-deck for all five laps for the championship with Shane edging Kelly by the smallest of margins.

The third race of the season was the Albert Lee Appliance Cup at Seafair held at Seattle, WA on July 31-August 2. Michael Kelly driving for Graham Trucking earned his second straight Albert Lee Cup victory at Seafair Sunday. He beat Jimmy Shane driving for Oh Boy! Oberto after their boats bumped in the final lap and Shane was penalized. Jean Theoret in the Ellstrom Elam Plus placed second, and Scott Liddycoat in the Les Schwab/RedDOT took third.

The fourth race of the season was the UAW/GM Spirit of Detroit Hydrofest held at Detroit, MI on August 22–23. Jimmy Shane, in the U-1 Oberto, thrilled the crowd in the seven-boat, five-lap final which included a side-by-side battle with J. Michael Kelly all the way down the backstretch on the next-to-last lap. Shane beat Kelly by seven-boat lengths. Brian Perkins finished third, followed by Cal Phipps and Scott Liddycoat.

The final race of the season was the San Diego Bayfair on September 18–20. For the third straight year Jimmy Shane won the H1 Unlimited Hydroplane national championship, wrapping up the title early on the final day of the 2015 San Diego Bayfair at Mission Bay. In the final, Shane dominated the way he had all weekend and polished off his perfect Bayfair performance with his second Bill Muncey Cup victory in the last three years. Scott Liddycoat, driver of the So. Call 811/Red Dot/Jones Racing boat, finished second in the final while Cal Phipps, driver of the Dalton Industries/Wiggins Racing boat, finished third. Oberto announced that this season was its final season as a title sponsor for an H1 Unlimited boat. The Miss Madison boat, which is publicly owned by the town of Madison, Ind., will continue racing next season under a different title sponsor.

== Season schedule and results ==
2015 H1 Unlimited Hydroplane Race Winners
Race title	Location	Date	Winning boat	Winning driver
Indiana Governor's Cup (Madison Regatta)	Ohio River, Madison, Indiana	July 3–5	Graham Trucking I†	J. Michael Kelly†
Silver Cup	Coeur d'Alene, Idaho	July 17–19	Event cancelled	
HAPO Gold Cup	Columbia River, Tri-Cities, Washington	July 24–26	Oh Boy! Oberto	Jimmy Shane
Albert Lee Appliance Cup	Lake Washington, Seattle, Washington	July 31-August 2	Graham Trucking I	J. Michael Kelly
UAW-GM Spirit of Detroit Hydrofest	Detroit River, Detroit, Michigan	August 22–23	Oh Boy! Oberto	Jimmy Shane
San Diego Bayfair	Mission Bay, San Diego, California, California	September 18–20	Oh Boy! Oberto	Jimmy Shane

†: Due to debris in the river as a result of recent rains, the course was shortened and was run as a non-championship exhibition race.

== National High Points Standings ==
2015 High Points
Place	Boat #	Boat	Driver	Points
1	U-1	Oh Boy! Oberto	Jimmy Shane	6,560
2	U-5	Graham Trucking I	J. Michael Kelly	5,463
3	U-27	Wiggins Racing	Cal Phipps	4,735
4	U-9	Red Dot/Les Schwab	Scott Liddycoat	4,703
5	U-21	Lakeridge Paving	Brian Perkins	3,603
6	U-3	Go3Racing	Jimmy King	3,107
7	U-96	Elam Plus	Jean Theoret	2,783
8	U-100	Leland Unlimited	Kevin Eacret	2,669
9	GBR11	Miss Peters & May	Tom Thompson	2,511
10	U-7	Graham Trucking II	Jesse Robertson	2,435
11	U-22	Webster Racing	Mike Webster	1,482
12	U-12/12R	Miss Diljulio	Patrick Sankuer (0) David Warren (691)	691
13	U-18	Bucket List Racing	Mark Evans (169) Kelly Stockton (0)	169
