= 2021 H1 Unlimited season =

The 2021 H1 Unlimited season is the sixty-fifth running of the H1 Unlimited series for unlimited hydroplanes, sanctioned by the APBA. The 2020 season would have been the sixty-fifth running but that season was cancelled because of COVID-19.

== Teams and drivers ==
2021 Teams
No	Boat	Engine	Owner	Driver
U-1	Goodman Real Estate/Miss HomeStreet	Lycoming T-55/L-7	City of Madison	Jeff Bernard and Jimmy Shane
U-3Ṫ	Grigg's Presents Ace Hardware	Turbocharged V-12 Allison	Ed Cooper	Jimmy King
U-8	Miss Tri-Cities	Lycoming T-55/L-7	Darrell & Vanessa Strong	J. Michael Kelly
U-9	Pinnacle Peak Consulting	Lycoming T-55/L-7	Darrell & Vanessa Strong	Corey Peabody
U-11	J&D's Hydraulic	Lycoming T-55/L-7	Scott and Shannon Raney	Jamie Nilsen
U-12	Graham Trucking	Lycoming T-55/L-7	Rob Graham	Andrew Tate
U-40	Beacon Plumbing	Lycoming T-55/L-7	Kelly and Sharon Stocklin	Dave Villwock
U-440	Martin Nelson & Co.	Lycoming T-53	Kelly and Sharon Stocklin	Dustin Echols and Kelly Stocklin

Note: Ṫ—The U-3 is the only piston powered boat in the fleet, powered by a dual turbocharged Allison V-12.

== Summary ==
The 2021 opened with the Guntersville Lake Hydrofest held at Guntersville, AL on June 26–27. J. Michael Kelly took home the Southern Cup Trophy for First Place Driver.

The second race was the APBA Gold Cup held at the Madison, IN Regatta on July 2–4. Jimmy Shane, driving Miss HomeStreet, captured his fifth Gold Cup victory Sunday in H1 Unlimited Racing Series on the Ohio River in Madison, Indiana. His victory in the 111th running of the event was the fifth in his career, putting him fourth on the list of all-time Gold Cup champions, tied with the legendary Gar Wood. Shane grabbed the inside lane at the start of the winner-take-all final heat and was never challenged. Andrew Tate, driving Graham Trucking, took second in the final heat and third-place honors went to Corey Peabody, driving Pinnacle Peak Consulting.

The third race was the HAPO Columbia Cup held at Tri-Cities, WA on July 23–25. Corey Peabody in the U-9 Pinnacle Peak Racing boat finished first. It's Peabody's first H1 Unlimited victory. J. Michael Kelly, driving the U-8 Miss Tri-Cities boat, finished second. Jimmy Shane, driving Miss HomeStreet, was forced to grab lane 5 on the outside before the race began and finished third.

The fourth and final race of the season was the San Diego Bayfair on September 17–19. On Saturday, September 18, Jimmy Shane drove the U-1 HomeStreet Bank to two heat wins to clinch the team national high points championship. In Sunday's final, J. Michael Kelly driving the U-8 Miss Tri-Cities is won the 2021 Bill Muncey Cup on Mission Bay and also won the National Drivers High Point Championship. Kelly was awarded the victory in San Diego after it was determined that Dave Villwock in the U-40 Beacon Plumbing — after crossing the finish line first in the final — was disqualified for going under 80 mph in the pre-race setup period. Because he jumped the gun, the U-1 Miss Homestreet driven by Jimmy Shane was given a one lap penalty. Shane was awarded second.

== Season schedule and results ==
2021 Season Schedule and Results
Race title	Location	Date	Winning boat	Winning driver
Guntersville Lake Hydrofest	Guntersville, Alabama	June 26–27	U-8 Miss Tri-Cities	J. Michael Kelly
APBA Gold Cup at the Madison Regatta	Ohio River, Madison, Indiana	July 2–4	U-1 HomeStreet presents Miss Goodman Real Estate	Jimmy Shane
HAPO Columbia Cup	Columbia River, Tri-Cities, Washington	July 23–25	U-9 Pinnacle Peak Consulting	Corey Peabody
San Diego Bayfair	Mission Bay, San Diego, California, California	September 17–19	U-8 Miss Tri-Cities	J. Michael Kelly

Both the HomeStreet Bank Cup and Detroit Hydrofest were cancelled due to the COVID-19 pandemic.

== National High Points Standings ==
National High Points Results
No	Boat	Driver	Guntersville	Madison	Tri-Cities	San Diego	Driver Total	Team Total
U-1	Miss Madison (Note: Raced as Goodman Real Estate/Miss Madison during the season.)	Jimmy Shane	300	1,600	1,925	1,600	5,425	6,454
U-1	Miss Madison	Jeff Bernard	1,029	—	—	—	1,029	6,454
U-8	Miss Tri-Cities	J. Michael Kelly	1,580	750	1,705	1,570	5,605	5,605
U-9	Pinnacle Peak Consulting	Corey Peabody	1,100	975	1,388	810	4,273	4,273
U-12	Graham Trucking	Andrew Tate	925	1,500	955	—	3,380	3,380
U-40	Beacon Plumbing	Dave Villwock	295	1,027	797	1,080	3,199	3,199
U-11	J&D's Hydraulic	Jamie Nilsen	825	469	1,323	50	2,667	2,667
U-3	Grigg's Presents Ace Hardware	Jimmy King	—	—	790	—	790	790
U-440	Martin Nelson & Co.	Dustin Echols	0	—	649	—	649	649
U-440	Martin Nelson & Co.	Kelly Stocklin	—	—	—	0	0	649
