= 2013 H1 Unlimited season =

Sports season

The 2013 H1 Unlimited season is the fifty-eighth running of the H1 Unlimited series for unlimited hydroplanes, sanctioned by the APBA.

== Teams and drivers ==
2013 Teams
No	Team	Driver	Owner	Engine
U-1	Oh Boy! Oberto/Miss Madison	Steve David	City of Madison	Lycoming T-55/L-7 turbine
U-5	Graham Trucking	Jimmy Shane	Rob Graham	Lycoming T-55/L-7 turbine
U-9	Red Dot	Jon Zimmerman	Lori and Mike Jones	Lycoming T-55/L-7 turbine
U-11	Peters & May	Tom Thompson	Scott Raney	Lycoming T-55/L-7 turbine
U-14	Toyota/Centurian Unlimited Racing	Greg Hopp	Jay Leckrone	Lycoming T-55/L-7 turbine
U-21	Go Fast, Turn Left Racing	Brian Perkins	Greg O’Farrell	Lycoming T-55/L-7 turbine
U-22	Rocky Mountain Tint/Webster Racing	Mike Webster	Webster Family	Lycoming T-55/L-7 turbine
U-37	Beacon Plumbing	J. Michael Kelly	Billy & Jane Schumacher	Lycoming T-55/L-7 turbine
U-48	Snoqualmie Casino	Jamie Nilsen	Greg O’Farrell	Lycoming T-55/L-7 turbine
U-57	FEDCO	Mark Evans	Evans Brothers Racing	Lycoming T-55/L-7 turbine
U-95	Spirit of Qatar	Kip Brown	Nate Brown	Lycoming T-55/L-7 turbine
U-100	Leland Unlimited	David Warren	Leland Racing	Lycoming T-55/L-7 turbine

== Season schedule and results ==
2013 High Points Season Schedule and Results
Race title	Location	Date	Winning boat	Winning driver
Oryx Cup/UIM Championship	Doha Bay, Doha, Qatar	February 8–12	Graham Trucking	Jimmy Shane
Big Wake Weekend	Folsom Lake, Folsom, California	May 31-June 2	Oh Boy! Oberto/Miss Madison	Steve David
Indiana Governor’s Cup	Ohio River, Madison, Indiana	July 5–7	Weather cancellation	
Detroit APBA Gold Cup	Detroit River, Detroit, Michigan	July 12–14	Spirit of Qatar	Kip Brown
Columbia Cup	Columbia River, Tri-Cities, Washington	July 26–28	Oh Boy! Oberto/Miss Madison	Steve David
Albert Lee Cup	Lake Washington, Seattle, Washington	August 1–3	Graham Trucking	Jimmy Shane
Diamond Cup	Lake Coeur d'Alene, Coeur d'Alene, Idaho	August 30-September 1	Graham Trucking	Jimmy Shane
HomeStreet Bank Bayfair	Mission Bay, San Diego, California, California	September 15–17	Graham Trucking	Jimmy Shane

== National High Points Standings ==
Team Standings
Place	Boat		Points
1	Graham Trucking	Jimmy Shane	10532
2	Oh Boy! Oberto/Miss Madison	Steve David	10464
3	Spirit of Qatar	Kip Brown	8234
4	Red Dot	Jon Zimmerman	5926
5	Beacon Plumbing	J. Michael Kelly	5873
6	Peters & May	Tom Thompson	5586
7	FEDCO	Evans/Robertson	4858
8	Rocky Mountain Tint/Webster Racing	Mike Webster	3639
9	Toyota/Centurian Unlimited Racing	Greg Hopp	3349
10	Go Fast, Turn Left Racing	Brian Perkins	1440
11	Leland Unlimited	David Warren	1243
12	Snoqualmie Casino	Jamie Nilsen	795
