= 2017 H1 Unlimited season =

The 2017 H1 Unlimited season is the sixty-second running of the H1 Unlimited series for unlimited hydroplanes, sanctioned by the APBA.

== Teams and drivers ==
2018 Teams
| No | Team | Driver | Owner | Engine |
|---|---|---|---|---|
| U-1 | HomeStreet Bank | Jimmy Shane | City of Madison | Lycoming T-55/L-7 turbine |
| U-3 | Go3RacingṪ | Jimmy King | Ed Cooper | Turbocharged V-12 Allison |
| U-7 | Spirit of Detroit | Bert Henderson | Dave Bartush | Lycoming T-55/L-7 turbine |
| U-9 | Delta/Realtrac | Andrew Tate | Lori and Mike Jones | Lycoming T-55/L-7 turbine |
| U-11 | Miss J & D's | Tom Thompson | Shannon and Scott Raney | Lycoming T-55/L-7 turbine |
| U-12 | Graham Trucking | J. Michael Kelly | Rob Graham | Lycoming T-55/L-7 turbine |
| U-16 | OH BOY! Oberto | J.W. Myers | Ellstrom Racing | Lycoming T-55/L-7 turbine |
| U-21 | Go Fast, Turn Left Racing | Brian Perkins | Greg O’Farrell | Lycoming T-55/L-7 turbine |
| U-27 | Wiggins Racing | Cal Phipps | Milt and Charley Wiggins | Lycoming T-55/L-7 turbine |
| U-440 | Bucket List Racing | Dustin Echols | Kelly Stocklin | Lycoming T-53 turbine |
| U-99.9 | Miss Rock powered by Carstar | Greg Hopp | Stacy Briseno / Leland Racing | Lycoming T-55/L-7 turbine |

Note: Ṫ—The U-3 is the only piston powered boat in the fleet, powered by a dual turbocharged Allison V-12.

== Season schedule and results ==
2017 High Points Season Schedule and Results
| Race title | Location | Date | Winning boat | Winning driver |
|---|---|---|---|---|
| HAPO Columbia Cup | Columbia River, Tri-Cities, Washington | July 28–30 | Graham Trucking | J. Michael Kelly |
| Albert Lee Cup | Lake Washington, Seattle, Washington | August 4–8 | HomeStreet Bank | Jimmy Shane |
| Metro Detroit Chevy Dealers Presidents Cup | Detroit River, Detroit, Michigan | August 26 | Delta/Realtrac | Andrew Tate |
| Metro Detroit Chevy Dealers APBA Gold Cup | Detroit River, Detroit, Michigan | August 27 | HomeStreet Bank | Jimmy Shane |
| HomeStreet Bank Bayfair | Mission Bay, San Diego, California, California | September 15–17 | Delta/Realtrac | Andrew Tate |

Note: The 2017 Madison Regatta was an unofficial H1 Unlimited event. The event was won by Andrew Tate in the U-9 Delta/Realtrac.

== National High Points Standings ==
National High Points Results
| No | Boat | Driver | Madison | Tri-Cities | Seattle | Presidents | Gold Cup | San Diego | Driver Total | Team Total |
|---|---|---|---|---|---|---|---|---|---|---|
| U-1 | HomeStreet Bank | Jimmy Shane | 0 | 1805 | 1469 | 1125 | 1180 | 1725 | 7304 | 7304 |
| U-3 | Go3Racing | Jimmy King | — | 1435 | — | 60 | 800 | — | 2295 | 2295 |
| U-7 | Spirit of Detroit | Bert Henderson | — | — | — | 809 | 565 | — | 1374 | 1374 |
| U-9 | Delta/Realtrac | Andrew Tate | 0 | 1769 | 1151 | 1280 | 1200 | 1580 | 6980 | 6980 |
| U-11 | Miss J & D's | Tom Thompson | 0 | 1250 | 863 | 70 | 60 | 1017 | 3260 | 3260 |
| U-12 | Graham Trucking | J. Michael Kelly | — | 1695 | 1570 | 950 | 770 | 1120 | 6105 | 6105 |
| U-16 | OH BOY! Oberto | J.W. Myers | — | — | 937 | — | — | — | 937 | 937 |
| U-21 | Go Fast, Turn Left Racing | Brian Perkins | — | 40 | 975 | — | — | — | 1015 | 1015 |
| U-27 | Wiggins Racing | Cal Phipps | 0 | — | — | — | — | — | 0 | 0 |
| U-440 | Bucket List Racing | Dustin Echols | — | — | 507 | 352 | 225 | 719 | 1803 | 1803 |
| U-99.9 | Miss Rock powered by Carstar | Greg Hopp | — | 915 | 789 | 0 | 0 | — | 1704 | 1704 |
