= 2018 H1 Unlimited season =

The 2018 H1 Unlimited season is the sixty-third running of the H1 Unlimited series for unlimited hydroplanes, sanctioned by the APBA.

== Teams and drivers ==
2018 Teams
No	Team	Driver	Owner	Engine
U-1	HomeStreet Bank	Jimmy Shane	City of Madison	Lycoming T-55/L-7 turbine
U-3	Go3RacingṪ	Jimmy King	Ed Cooper	Turbocharged V-12 Allison
U-7	Spirit of Detroit	Bert Henderson	Dave Bartush	Lycoming T-55/L-7 turbine
U-9	Delta/Realtrac and Les Schwab Tires	Andrew Tate	Lori and Mike Jones	Lycoming T-55/L-7 turbine
U-11	Reliable Diamond Tool presents J&D's	Tom Thompson	Shannon and Scott Raney	Lycoming T-55/L-7 turbine
U-12	Graham Trucking	J. Michael Kelly	Rob Graham	Lycoming T-55/L-7 turbine
U-21	Go Fast, Turn Left Racing	Brian Perkins	Greg O’Farrell	Lycoming T-55/L-7 turbine
U-440	Bucket List Racing	Dustin Echols	Kelly Stocklin	Lycoming T-53 turbine
U-99.9	Miss Rock powered by Carstar	Aaron Salmon	Greg O’Farrell	Lycoming T-55/L-7 turbine

Note: Ṫ—The U-3 is the only piston powered boat in the fleet, powered by a dual turbocharged Allison V-12.

== Season schedule and results ==
2018 Season Schedule and Results
Race title	Location	Date	Winning boat	Winning driver
Guntersville Lake Hydrofest	Guntersville, Alabama	June 22–24	Delta/Realtrac and Les Schwab Tires	Andrew Tate
Indiana Governor's Cup	Ohio River, Madison, Indiana	July 6–8	HomeStreet Bank	Jimmy Shane
HAPO Columbia Cup	Columbia River, Tri-Cities, Washington	July 26–28	Delta/Realtrac and Les Schwab Tires	Andrew Tate
Albert Lee Cup	Lake Washington, Seattle, Washington	August 2–4	Delta/Realtrac and Les Schwab Tires	Andrew Tate
Metro Detroit Chevy Dealers APBA Gold Cup	Detroit River, Detroit, Michigan	August 24–26	Delta/Realtrac and Les Schwab Tires	Andrew Tate
HomeStreet Bank Bayfair	Mission Bay, San Diego, California, California	September 14–16	Delta/Realtrac and Les Schwab Tires	Andrew Tate

== National High Points Standings ==
National High Points Results
No	Boat	Driver	Guntersville	Madison	Tri-Cities	Seattle	Detroit	San Diego	Driver Total	Team Total
U-1	HomeStreet Bank	Jimmy Shane	1180	1580	600	1427	2000	1200	7987	7987
U-3	Go3Racing	Jimmy King	—	—	146	—	620	—	756	756
U-7	Spirit of Detroit	Bert Henderson	—	—	—	—	565	—	565	565
U-9	Delta/Realtrac and Les Schwab Tires	Andrew Tate	1700	1500	2080	1505	1805	1580	10170	10170
U-11	Reliable Diamond Tool presents J&D's	Tom Thompson	1195	1220	1092	464	1585	625	6181	6181
U-12	Graham Trucking	J. Michael Kelly	—	—	895	829	—	—	1724	1724
U-21	Go Fast, Turn Left Racing	Brian Perkins	1094	—	1119	1175	—	1295	4683	4683
U-440	Bucket List Racing	Dustin Echols	60	1229	932	424	1444	1110	5199	5199
U-99.9	Miss Rock powered by Carstar	Aaron Salmon	—	225	225	949	—	525	1924	1924
