= Hayden Homes Amphitheater =

Outdoor theater in Oregon, United States

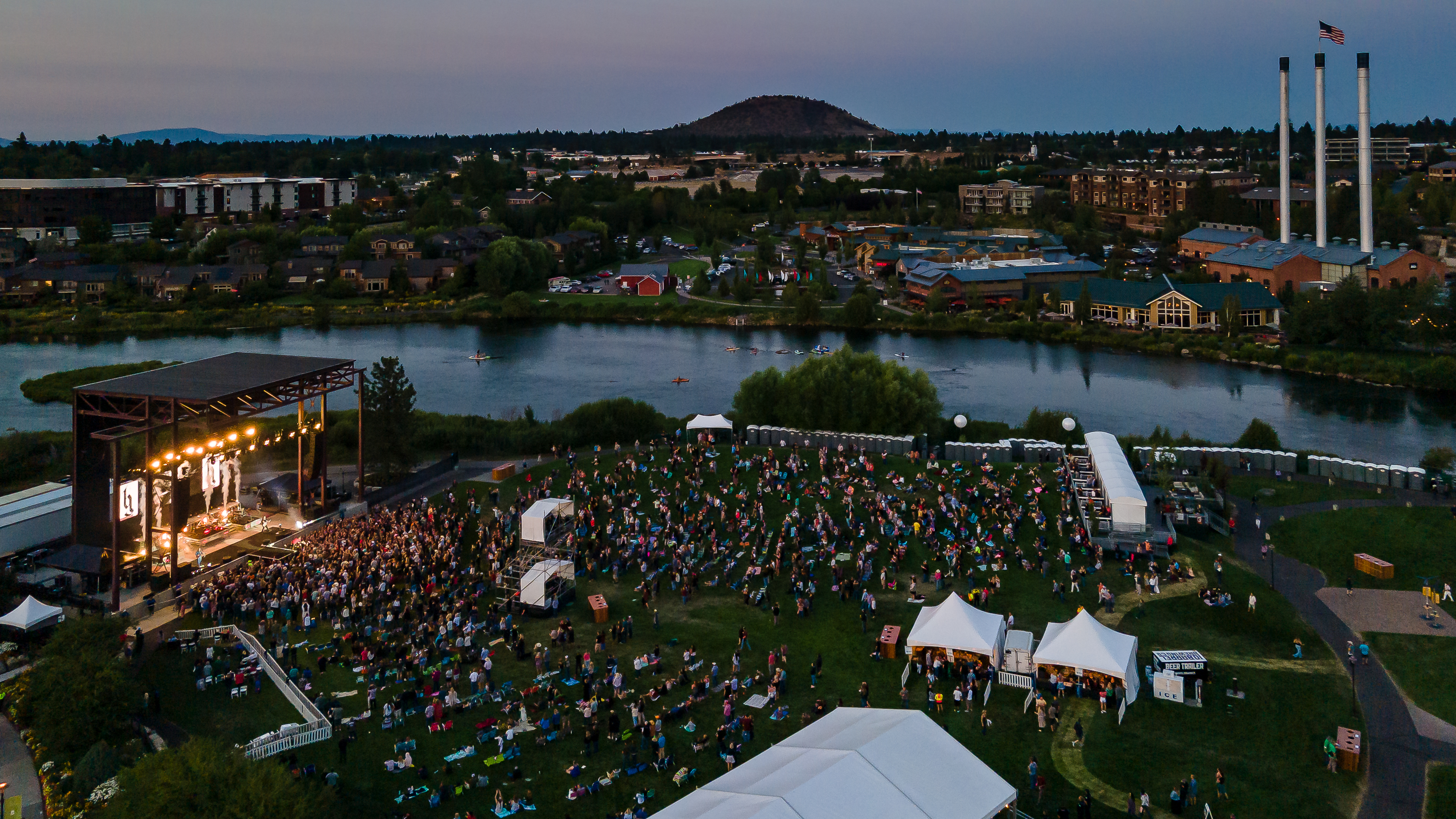
- The amphitheater in 2021
- Interactive map of Hayden Homes Amphitheater
- Address: 344 SW Shevlin-Hixon Dr; Bend, OR 97702
- Location: Bend, Oregon
- Coordinates: 44.047°N 121.318°W
- Capacity: 8,000

Construction
- Opened: 2002

Website
- https://bendconcerts.com/

The Hayden Homes Amphitheater is an outdoor amphitheater built in the historic Old Mill District in Bend, Oregon. The amphitheater's name-in-title sponsor is Hayden Homes, a Central Oregon home builder. The venue was formerly named the Les Schwab Amphitheater, after a Central Oregon businessman.

Opened in 2002, the venue accommodates approximately 8,000 people for concerts and other events in a casual outdoor setting. On the west bank of the Deschutes River, it sits at an elevation of 3,600 feet (1,100 metres) above sea level.

== Overview ==
The venue was built in 2001 and opened the next year as the Les Schwab Amphitheater, after the Central Oregon businessman who founded the tire retail chain also carrying his name.

Artists that have performed at the amphitheater include Coldplay, Willie Nelson, the Beach Boys, the Pixies, Crosby, Stills & Nash, Jack Johnson, Fiona Apple, ZZ Top, Paul Simon, AFI, The Flaming Lips, Wilco, Beck, Bob Dylan, The Shins, Tenacious D, Ringo Starr, the Dave Matthews Band, Phish, Portugal. The Man, John Legend, My Morning Jacket, 311, Khruangbin, the Chicks, Norah Jones, Indigo Girls, Tears for Fears, LCD Soundsystem, Tegan and Sara, Vampire Weekend, Primus, Spoon, St. Vincent, "Weird Al" Yankovic, and Jim Gaffigan. The venue has also hosted events such as Bend Brewfest.

The venue was one of four finalists selected in the 2016 Sunset Magazine Awards in the "Best Outdoor Music Venue" category, which honors a Western theater, amphitheater or other outdoor concert site for constantly delighting music lovers.

In 2020, the venue was upgraded to accommodate larger productions. It re-opened for the 2021 concert season with new seating areas and a modified design for improved viewing. In November of that year, the amphitheater was renamed the Hayden Homes Amphitheater after a Central Oregon-based home builder established in Redmond in 1989, after it had been a longtime supporter of the venue. According to developer of the Old Mill District Bill Smith, "Hayden Homes shares the same values we do. We named the venue after Les Schwab the man for 20 years, to honor his contribution to helping build the Old Mill District. Hayden Homes builds and invests in this community ... Passing the torch to Hayden Homes feels right."

== Economic impact ==
A 2015 research study found that the Hayden Homes Amphitheater impacts the Central Oregon economy in the following ways:

- 125,000 visitors to the venue brought in an estimated 27 million dollars of revenue to the region
- Among the out-of-town visitors, 75 percent said they came specifically for the concert.
- The average length of stay for out-of-town concert attendees was 3.4 nights with 74 percent staying in Bend lodging accommodations, and the remaining 26 percent divided between surrounding communities of Redmond, Sunriver and Sisters.
- Total concert-related spending in the Central Oregon area was estimated to be nearly $19 million, spent on dining, shopping, lodging, recreation, groceries, gas stations, and a variety of other services.
- Total trip-related spending by out-of-town visitors attracted to Bend specifically to attend the concert series was $16 million.

== Gallery ==
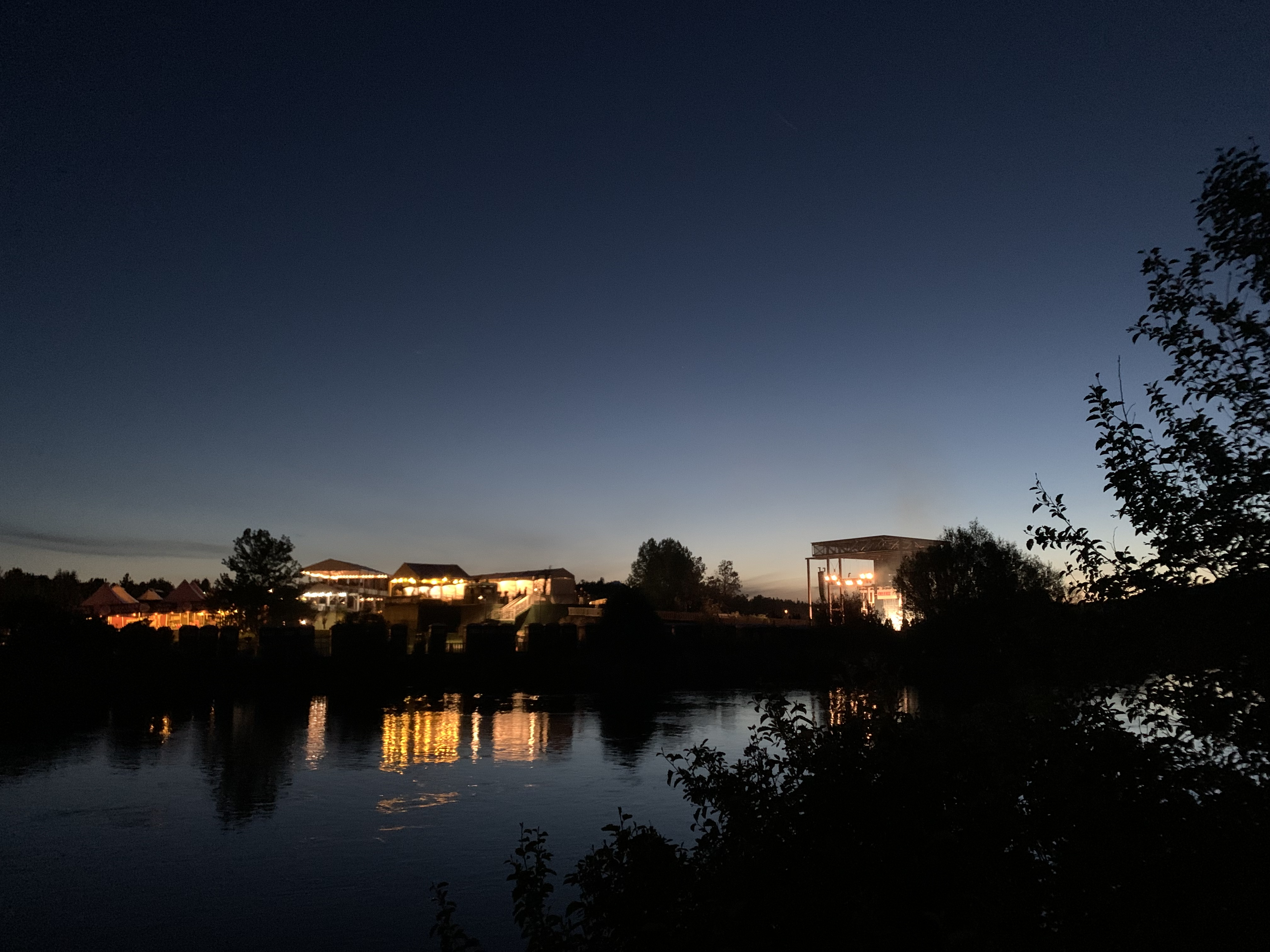
View from across the Deschutes River

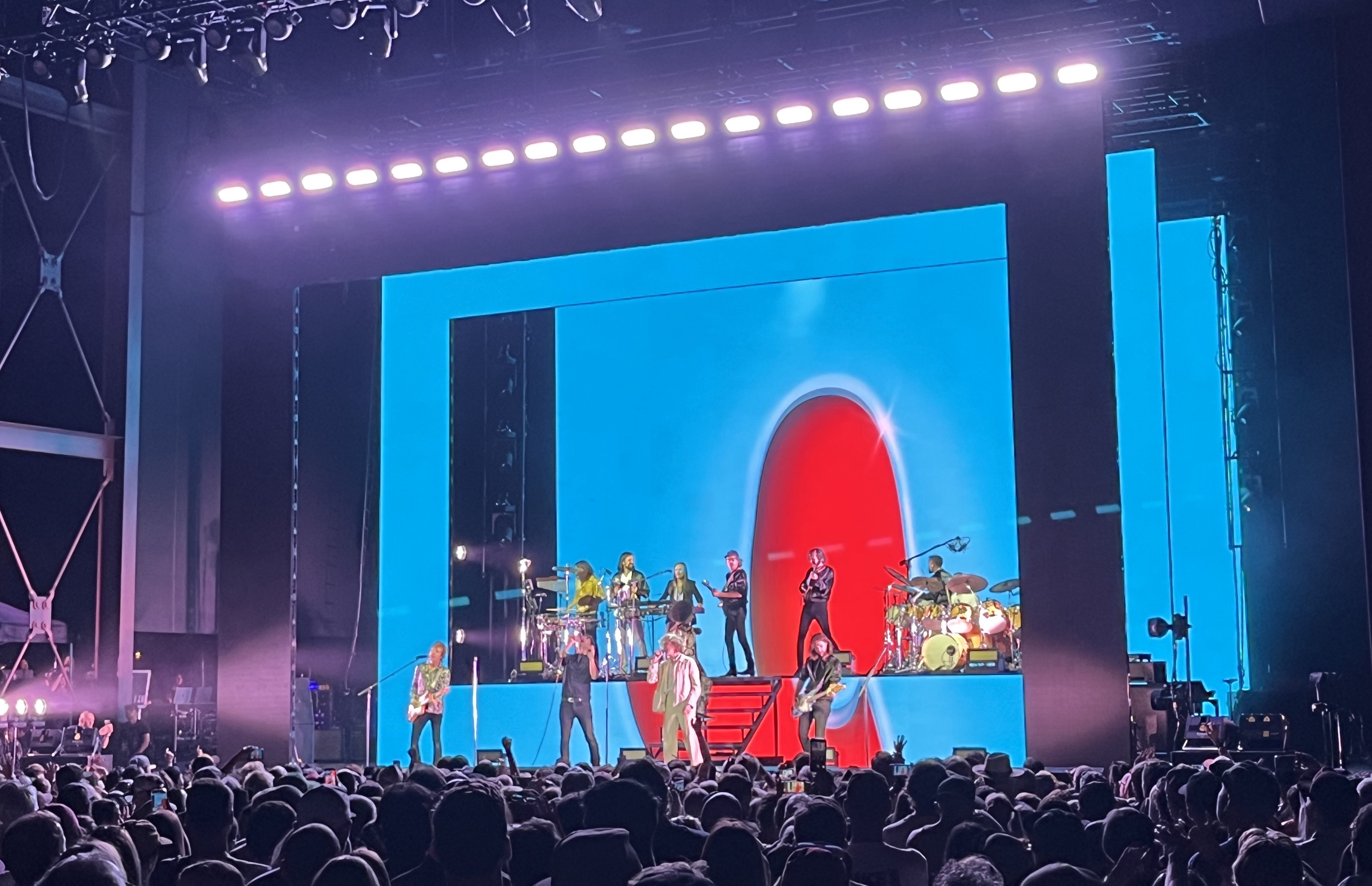
Beck plays with Phoenix in 2023
