= 2014 H1 Unlimited season =

Sports season

The 2014 H1 Unlimited season is the fifty-ninth running of the H1 Unlimited series for unlimited hydroplanes, sanctioned by the APBA.

== Teams and drivers ==
2014 Teams
No	Team	Driver	Owner	Engine
U-1	Graham Trucking	J. Michael Kelly	Rob Graham	Lycoming T-55/L-7 turbine
U-6	Oberto/Miss Madison	Jimmy Shane	City of Madison	Lycoming T-55/L-7 turbine
U-7	Graham Trucking II	Cal Phipps	Rob Graham	Lycoming T-55/L-7 turbine
U-9	Red Dot	Jon Zimmerman	Lori and Mike Jones	Lycoming T-55/L-7 turbine
GBR11	Miss J & D's	Tom Thompson	Shannon and Scott Raney	Lycoming T-55/L-7 turbine
U-12	Miss DiJulio	Greg Hopp/ Jesse Robertson	Jay Leckrone	Lycoming T-55/L-7 turbine
U-17	Our Gang Racing	Jeff Bernard	Nate Brown	Lycoming T-55/L-7 turbine
U-18	Bucket List Racing	Kelly Stocklin	Kelly Stocklin	Lycoming T-53 turbine
U-21	Go Fast, Turn Left Racing	Jamie Nielson/ Jeff Bernard/ Scott Liddycoat/ Dave Villwock	Greg O'Farrell	Lycoming T-55/L-7 turbine
U-22	Webster Racing	Mike Webster	Webster Family	Lycoming T-55/L-7 turbine
U-37	Beacon Plumbing	Dave Villwock	Billy & Jane Schumacher	Lycoming T-55/L-7 turbine
U-96	Qatar	Kip Brown/Jean Theoret	Ellstrom Family	Lycoming T-55/L-7 turbine
U-100	Leland Racing	Dave Warren	Leland Racing	Lycoming T-55/L-7 turbine

== Season schedule and results ==
2014 High Points Season Schedule and Results
Race title	Location	Date	Winning boat	Winning driver
Indiana Governor's Cup	Ohio River, Madison, Indiana	July 5–6	Graham Trucking	J. Michael Kelly
Detroit APBA Gold Cup	Detroit River, Detroit, Michigan	July 11–13	Oberto/Miss Madison	Jimmy Shane
HAPO Columbia Cup	Columbia River, Tri-Cities, Washington	July 25–27	Oberto/Miss Madison	Jimmy Shane
Albert Lee Cup	Lake Washington, Seattle, Washington	August 1–3	Graham Trucking	J. Michael Kelly
Diamond Cup	Lake Coeur d'Alene, Coeur d'Alene, Idaho	August 30-September 1	Cancelled by organizers on July 19	
HomeStreet Bank Bayfair	Mission Bay, San Diego, California, California	September 15–17	Graham Trucking	J. Michael Kelly
Oryx Cup/UIM Championship	Doha Bay, Doha, Qatar	November 20–22	Graham Trucking	J. Michael Kelly

== National High Points Standings ==
2014 Team Championship
Place	Boat	Points
1	Oberto/Miss Madison	9157
2	Graham Trucking	8736
3	Graham Trucking II	7115
4	Red Dot	5604
5	Go Fast, Turn Left Racing	4652
6	Webster Racing	4005
7	Miss J & D's	3962
8	Qatar	2920
9	Leland Racing	1388
10	Bucket List Racing	1248
11	Miss DiJulio	1243
12	Beacon Plumbing	375
13	Our Gang Racing	209

2014 Driver Championship
Place	Driver	Points
1	Jimmy Shane	9157
2	J. Michael Kelly	8736
3	Cal Phipps	7115
4	Jon Zimmerman	5604
5	Mike Webster	4005
6	Tom Thompson	3962
7	Jamie Nielson	3232
8	Kip Brown	1870
9	Dave Warren	1388
10	Kelly Stocklin	1248
11	Jean Theoret	1050
12	Jeff Bernard	1024
13	Greg Hopp	891
14	Dave Villwock	705
15	Jesse Robertson	352
16	Scott Liddycoat	275
