= 2015 APBA Gold Cup =

- Date: July 24–26, 2015
- Location: Columbia River in Kennewick, Washington
- Course: Temporary water circuit 2.5 mi (4.023 km)
- Distance: 5 laps, 12.5 miles (20.117 km)
- Scheduled distance: 5 laps, 12.5 miles (20.117 km)
- Weather: Partly sunny skies with a temperature of 79°F (26°C); wind out of the south at 8 mph (12.9 km/h)

Pole position
- Winner: Jean Theoret; U-96 Ellstrom Racing
- Speed: 160.509

Heat race winners
- Heat 1A Winner: Jean Theoret; U-96 Ellstrom Racing
- Heat 1B Winner: Jimmy Shane; U-1 Miss Madison
- Heat 2A Winner: J. Michael Kelly; U-5 Porter Racing I
- Heat 2B Winner: Scott Liddycoat; U-9 Jones Racing
- Heat 3A Winner: Cal Phipps; U-27 Wiggins Racing
- Heat 3B Winner: Jean Theoret; U-96 Ellstrom Racing
- Heat 4A Winner: Jimmy Shane; U-1 Miss Madison
- Heat 4B Winner: J. Michael Kelly; U-5 Porter Racing I

Winner
- Team: Jimmy Shane; U-1 Miss Madison

The 2015 APBA Gold Cup, the 111th running of the APBA Gold Cup race and the 50th running of the local event, was held on July 24, 25, and 26, 2015 on the Columbia River in Kennewick, Washington. Contested over eight heats and a final on the 2.5-mile (4 km) oval, it was the first points-payin race of the 2015 H1 Unlimited season after the original first race, the Indiana's Governors Cup, was converted into an exhibition event after numerous delays. Jimmy Shane won the race, his second consecutive and all-time APBA Gold Cup win, the first win of the season, and the third APBA Gold Cup win for Miss Madison. J. Michael Kelly finished second, while Cal Phipps, Brian Perkins, and Scott Liddycoat rounded out the top five.

Jean Theoret won the pole with a speed of 160.509 miles per hour (258.314 km/h). Jimmy Shane, J. Michael Kelly, and Jean Theoret each won two heats apiece, with Scott Liddycoat and Cal Phipps winning the two remaining heats.

== Qualifying ==
Jean Theoret ran the fastest lap in qualifying with a speed of 160.509 mph (258.314 km/h). However, due to an N2 violation, the team was fined $100 following the time trials.

Pos	No.	Driver	Team	Speed
1	U-96	Jean Theoret	Ellstrom Racing	160.509
2	U-1	Jimmy Shane	Miss Madison	157.395
3	U-5	J. Michael Kelly	Porter Racing I	156.519

== Heats ==
=== Heat 1A (July 25) ===
Jean Theoret won Heat 1A with a top lap speed of 141.697 mph (228.039 km/h).

==== Results ====
Pos	No.	Driver	Team	Points
1	U-96	Jean Theoret	Ellstrom Racing	400
2	U-3	Jimmy King	Go 3 Racing	300
3	U-100	Kevin Eacret	Leland Unlimited Racing	225
4	U-9	Scott Liddycoat	Jones Racing	169
5	U-7	Jesse Robertson	Porter Racing II	127
6	GBR11	Tom Thompson	Unlimited Racing Group	95

==== Violations ====
No.	Reason	Penalty
U-7	Jumped Gun	One Lap
U-11	Failure to leave Right of Way to U-11	One Lap and $250 fine

=== Heat 1B (July 25) ===
Jimmy Shane won Heat 1B with a top lap speed of 143.441 mph (230.846 km/h).

==== Results ====
Pos	No.	Driver	Team	Points
1	U-1	Jimmy Shane	Miss Madison	400
2	U-27	Cal Phipps	Wiggins Racing	300
3	U-21	Brian Perkins	Go Fast Turn Left Racing	225
4	U-5	J. Michael Kelly	Porter Racing I	169
5	U-22	Mike Webster	Webster Racing	0

==== Violations ====
No.	Reason	Penalty
U-5	Jumped Gun	One Lap
U-22	Inside Buoy	Disqualification

=== Heat 2A (July 26) ===
Heat 2A was scheduled to be run on Saturday, July 25, but, due to high winds, was moved to Sunday. J. Michael Kelly won Heat 2A with a top lap speed of 151.194 mph (243.323 km/h).

==== Results ====
Pos	No.	Driver	Team	Points
1	U-5	J. Michael Kelly	Porter Racing I	400
2	U-96	Jean Theoret	Ellstrom Racing	300
3	U-1	Jimmy Shane	Miss Madison	225
4	U-22	Mike Webster (hydroplane racer)	Webster Racing	169
5	U-3	Jimmy King	Go 3 Racing	0

==== Violations ====
No.	Reason	Penalty
U-3	DMZ Violation	Disqualification

=== Heat 2B (July 26) ===
Like Heat 2A, Heat 2B was scheduled to be run on Saturday, July 25, but, due to high winds, was moved to Sunday. Scott Liddycoat won Heat 1A with a top lap speed of 144.763 mph (232.973 km/h).

==== Results ====
Pos	No.	Driver	Team	Points
1	U-9	Scott Liddycoat	Jones Racing	400
2	U-27	Cal Phipps	Wiggins Racing	300
3	GBR11	Tom Thompson	Unlimited Racing Group	225
4	U-21	Brian Perkins	Go Fast Turn Left Racing	169
5	U-7	Jesse Robertson	Porter Racing II	127
6	U-100	Kevin Eacret	Leland Unlimited Racing	95

=== Heat 3A (July 26) ===
Cal Phipps won Heat 3A with a top speed of 142.899 mph (229.974 km/h).

==== Results ====
Pos	No.	Driver	Team	Points
1	U-27	Cal Phipps	Wiggins Racing	400
2	U-21	Brian Perkins	Go Fast Turn Left Racing	300
3	GBR11	Tom Thompson	Lnlimited Racing Group	225
4	U-3	Jimmy King	Go 3 Racing	169
5	U-7	Jesse Robertson	Porter Racing II	0
6	U-12	Mark Evans	Centurion Racing	0

==== Violations ====
No.	Reason	Penalty
U-7	TBA	DNF
U-12	DMZ Violation	Disqualification

=== Heat 3B (July 26) ===
Jean Theoret won Heat 3B with a top lap speed of 148.129 mph (238.391 km/h). However, Theoret committed an unknown Level II penalty and thus was fined $250 and had 50 points deducted from his heat earnings.

==== Results ====
Pos	No.	Driver	Team	Points
1	U-96	Jean Theoret	Ellstrom Racing	350
2	U-1	Jimmy Shane	Miss Madison	300
3	U-9	Scott Liddycoat	Jones Racing	225
4	U-22	Mike Webster	Webster Racing	169
5	U-100	Kevin Eacret	Leland Unlimited Racing	127
6	U-5	J. Michael Kelly	Porter Racing I	95

==== Violations ====
No.	Reason	Penalty
U-5	Jumped the Gun	$250 Fine and 50-Point Deduction
U-96	Unknown Level II Violation	$250 Fine and 50-Point Deduction

=== Heat 4A (July 26) ===
Jimmy Shane won Heat 4A with a top lap speed of 144.999 mph (233.353 km/h).

==== Results ====
Pos	No.	Driver	Team	Points
1	U-1	Jimmy Shane	Miss Madison	400
2	U-27	Cal Phipps	Wiggins Racing	300
3	U-21	Brian Perkins	Go Fast Turn Left Racing	225
4	U-12	Mark Evans	Centurion Racing	169
5	U-7	Jesse Robertson	Porter Racing II	127

==== Violations ====
No.	Reason	Penalty
U-7	Didn't Maintain Speed Before Start	One Lap

=== Heat 4B (July 26) ===
J. Michael Kelly won Heat 4B with a top lap speed of 145.018 mph (233.384 km/h).

==== Results ====
Pos	No.	Driver	Team	Points
1	U-5	J. Michael Kelly	Porter Racing II	400
2	U-9	Scott Liddycoat	Jones Racing	300
3	U-22	Mike Webster	Webster Racing	225
4	U-96	Jean Theoret	Ellstrom Racing	169
5	GBR11	Tom Thompson	Unlimited Racing Group	127

==== Violations ====
No.	Reason	Penalty
U-96	Didn't Maintain Speed Before Start	One Lap
GBR11	Jumped Gun	One Lap

=== Final Heat (July 26) ===
Jimmy Shane won the Final Heat with a top lap speed of 145.018 mph (233.384 km/h) to win his second consecutive and overall APBA Gold Cup, both with Miss Madison. Jean Theoret dominated the final, but was later disqualified due to a DMZ violation.

==== Results ====
Pos	No.	Driver	Team	Points
1	U-1	Jimmy Shane	Miss Madison	400
2	U-5	J. Michael Kelly	Porter Racing I	300
3	U-27	Cal Phipps	Wiggins Racing	225
4	U-21	Brian Perkins	Go Fast Turn Left Racing	169
5	U-9	Scott Liddycoat	Jones Racing	127
6	GBR11	Tom Thompson	Unlimited Racing Group	95
7	U-96	Jean Theoret	Ellstrom Racing	0

==== Violations ====
No.	Reason	Penalty
U-96	DMZ Violation	Disqualification
