= Evergreen Speedway =

Motorsports track in the United States

- Oval (1954–present)
- Location: Monroe, Washington
- Coordinates: 47°52′7″N 121°59′14″W
- Capacity: 15,000
- Owner: Snohomish County
- Operator: High Road Promotions (March 2011–present)
- Opened: 1955
- Major events: Current: Formula D (2006–present); Former: ARCA Menards Series West (1964–1965, 1967–1993, 1996–2008, 2011–2020, 2022–2023); Global Rallycross (2016–2017); NASCAR Northwest Series (1985–2006); NASCAR Craftsman Truck Series (1995–2000)

Outer Oval
- Surface: Asphalt
- Length: 0.625 mi (1.006 km)

Inner Oval 1
- Surface: Asphalt
- Length: 0.375 mi (0.604 km)

Inner Oval 2
- Surface: Asphalt
- Length: 0.200 mi (0.322 km)

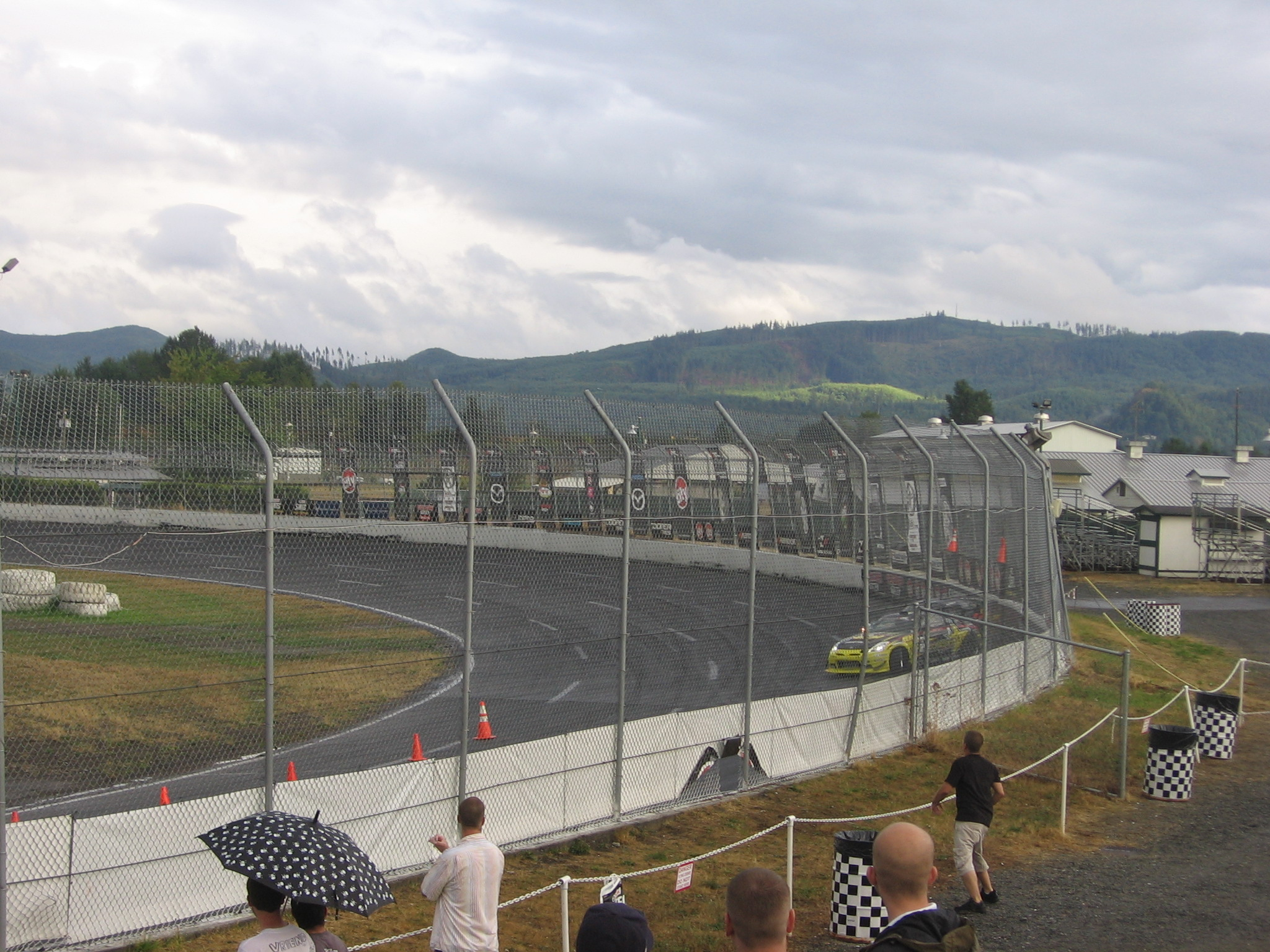
Turn 1

Evergreen Speedway is an automobile racetrack located within the confines of the Evergreen State Fairgrounds in Monroe, Washington. The stadium can accommodate up to 7,500 spectators in the covered grandstand and an additional 7,500 in the uncovered modular grandstands. The layout of the track is unique in that it incorporates an oversized 0.625 mi (1.006 km) paved outer oval, a 0.375 mi (0.604 km) paved inner oval, a 0.200 mi (0.322 km) paved inner oval, a 0.125 mi (0.201 km) dragstrip, and the #2 ranked figure-eight track in the United States. The track is the only sanctioned NASCAR track in Washington State. Evergreen Speedway hosts Formula D the third weekend in July every year. Along with NASCAR, the multi-purpose track can be configured to road courses with sanctioned SCCA, USAC, ASA and NSRA events. Under new ownership for the 2011 season and beyond, Evergreen Speedway has become a NASCAR Top Ten Short Track in North America from 2012 though 2016.

== History ==
The land was originally the Snohomish County poor farm, which was established in 1893. In 1949 the county allowed the Evergreen State Fair to use a portion of the land. In 1950 the county allowed the fair to use more land upon which a 0.625 mi (1.006 km) horse track was built. In 1954 Jimmie Collier convinced Snohomish County officials to allow him to convert the track for use in racing his Ford Model T roadster. The fair board, led by manager Bob Follis, promoted racing events over the Memorial Day and July 4 holidays in 1955. Poor weather hampered the events and after losing much money the fair board contracted with Gents Enterprises out of Seattle to promote events in 1956. Those events were discontinued in July 1956. The track continued with equestrian events over the next few years, but auto racing was not. In 1962 Dick Norton signed a ten-year contract to promote events on the track. After signing the contract, he planned on running a few end of the season events on the dirt but was unable to do so. The track was paved in the early 1963 and the first events were held over the Memorial Day weekend. An inner 1/5th mile track and the figure eight track was paved in 1966 and in 1967 the original bleachers were demolished and the current grandstands built.

Through the years the track played host to a wide variety of racing events including Sprint Cars, Roadsters, Midgets, Figure Eights, Foreign Stock, Modified, Hobby Stocks, Jalopies, Limited Sportsmen, Demolition, Grand National, Winston West, NASCAR Northwest Tour, Super Stocks, Mini Stocks, Stinger-8, Hornets and Bombers. Evergreen Speedway also hosted the "500," the richest and most prestigious race in the west.

The NASCAR Craftsman Truck Series ran an event at Evergreen Speedway once per year from 1995 to 2000.

=== 2011- present ===
High Road Promotions LLC owner Douglas Hobbs won the Snohomish County bid to operate Evergreen Speedway until 2036. The 25-year contract, beginning in March 2011, ensures NASCAR will remain in the state of Washington. As the only NASCAR track in Washington state, Evergreen Speedway was the first West Coast facility to feature a 500 lap NASCAR event. Douglas Hobbs has extensive automobile, world stage events management, such as four Olympic Games and regional and NASCAR experience, assisting Evergreen Speedway landing the Craftsman Truck Series race at the track. Evergreen Speedway hosts a number of local as well as regional racing series’. The NASCAR Whelen All American Series runs on a weekly basis. Some of the classes that can currently be seen are Speedway Chevrolet Super Late Models (Super Stocks), Les Schwab Street Stocks (Bombers), Foster Press Mini Stocks, Super Figure-Eights, Outlaw Figure-8s, Stinger-8s, Northwest Legends, Hornets, Jr. Hornets (12–14 year olds), School Bus Races, Crash Cars, Demolition Derbies, Drifting, Autocross, and drag racing.

2012 marked the addition of the Richard Petty Driving Experience. A Motocross Track and beginners MX track for riders 65cc and under. Also an ATV race facility was added.

Evergreen Speedway is the premiere "Short Track" on the Northwest, in addition to being named the #2 Figure 8 track in America.

Evergreen Speedway is one of the stops of the Formula Drift professional drift series.

Along with the professional drift series, Evergreen Speedway is also the location for the Evergreen Drift ProAm series. Evergreen Drift is the Northwest series that feeds drivers into the Pro ranks of FD. Through Evergreen Drift, Evergreen Speedway plays host to not only the series events but also many open drift and drift school events.

Evergreen Speedway hosted a Global RallyCross Championship round in 2016. It was confirmed later that Evergreen will also have a round in 2017.
