= 2016 H1 Unlimited season =

Sports season

The 2016 H1 Unlimited season is the sixty-first running of the H1 Unlimited series for unlimited hydroplanes, sanctioned by the APBA.

== Teams and drivers ==
In 2016, all boats used Lycoming Engines with the exception of the U-3 Go3Racing team which used an Allison V-12 engine and the U-18 Bucket List Racing team that used a smaller T-53 Lycoming turbine engine.

2016 Teams
No	Team	Driver	Owner	Engine
U-1	Miss HomeStreet Bank	Jimmy Shane	City of Madison	Lycoming T55
U-3	Grigg's Ace Hardware; Miss DiJulio	Jimmy King	Ed Cooper	Allison V-12
U-5	Graham Trucking I	J. Michael Kelly	Ted Porter	Lycoming T55
U-7	Graham Trucking II	Jeff Bernard	Ted Porter	Lycoming T55
U-9	Bello's Realtrac Performance/ Les Schwab/ Delta Research/Realtrac	Andrew Tate (R)	Mike and Lori Jones	Lycoming T55
U-11	Miss Peters & May	Tom Thompson	Scott and Shannon Raney	Lycoming T55
U-16	Oh Boy! Oberto	Jean Theoret	Ellstrom Family	Lycoming T55
U-18	Bucket List Racing	Dustin Echols	Kelly Stocklin	Lycoming T53
U-21	PayneWest Insurance/ Albert Lee Appliance/ Miss Al Deeby/ All Access Equipment	Brian Perkins	Greg and Brian O'Farrell	Lycoming T55
U-27	Dalton Industries	Cal Phipps	Milt and Charley Wiggins	Lycoming T55
U-57	Spirit of Detroit	Corey Peabody (R)	Dave Bartush	Lycoming T55
U-99.9	CARSTAR/Miss Rock	Kevin Eacret	Stacy Briseno	Lycoming T55

== 2016 Season Summary ==
The 2016 season began with the 66th annual Madison Regatta held in Madison, IN on July 1–3. Jimmy Shane, piloting the hometown U-1 HomeStreet Bank Miss Madison boat, finished first. J. Michael Kelly, in the U-5 Graham Trucking craft, officially placed second, followed by Brian Perkins, piloting the U-21 PayneWest Insurance.

The next race was the HAPO Columbia Cup held at Tri-Cities, WA on July 29–31. J. Michael Kelly, driving the U-5 Graham Trucking, was named the winner of the 2016 HAPO Columbia Cup. Jimmy Shane drove the U-1 Miss HomeStreet Bank to an apparent victory; however, after the race, H1 officials reviewed video and reversed an initial call, saying Shane slid out from Lane 1 and hit Jean Theoret in the U-16 Oh Boy! Oberto. Theoret finished second behind Kelly, while Jimmy King in the U-3 Griggs presents the Miss Ace Hardware was third. The U-1 Miss HomeStreet Bank team filed an appeal with the APBA, and on December 7, 2016, the team received notification from APBA National Commissioner, Charles D. Strang, that their August appeal and request for a review of the final heat and race results of the 2016 HAPO Columbia Cup was completed and that the HomeStreet Bank Unlimited Hydroplane had been declared the winner of the race.

The third race of the season was the Albert Lee Cup at Seafair held at Seattle, WA on August 5–7. Andrew Tate in the U-9 Sound Propeller presents Les Schwab Tires boa grabbed the inside lane on the Lake Washington course and grabbed the first win by a rookie at Seafair since 1956. Jimmy Shane in the U-1 HomeStreet Bank finished second. Third place was awarded to Brian Perkins at the wheel of U-21 Albert Lee Appliance, after J. Michael Kelly was hit with a one-lap penalty for a lane violation.

The fourth race of the season was the ABPA Gold Cup hosted by the UAW-GM Hydrofest at Detroit, MI on August 26–28. J. Michael Kelly in the U-5 Graham Trucking won the 100th anniversary Gold Cup to beat two-time defending champion Jimmy Shane in the U-1 HomeStreet Bank by 30 lengths. Jeff Bernard in the U-7 took third.

The final race of the season was the San Diego Bayfair on September 15–17. Jimmy Shane drove U-1 Miss HomeStreet Bank to a convincing victory at the HomeStreet Bayfair Regatta for the Bill Muncey Cup on Mission Bay. In addition, the Miss HomeStreet Bank team captured its third consecutive national championship, and Shane earned his fourth consecutive driving championship. Second place went to Andrew Tate driving U-9 Delta Realtrac, and J. Michael Kelly finished third with U-5 Graham Trucking.

== Season schedule and results ==
2016 Race Results
Race	Location	Dates	Winning Boat	Winning driver
MainSource Bank's Indiana Governors Cup	Madison, IN	July 1–3	Miss HomeStreet Bank	Jimmy Shane
HAPO Columbia Cup	Tri-Cities, WA	July 29–31	Miss HomeStreet Bank	Jimmy Shane
Albert Lee Appliance Seafair Cup	Seattle, WA	August 5–7	Les Schwab/Sound Propeller	Andrew Tate
UAW-GM Hydrofest-APBA Gold Cup	Detroit, MI	August 26–28	Graham Trucking	J. Michael Kelly
San Diego Bayfair	San Diego, CA	September 15–17	Miss HomeStreet Bank	Jimmy Shane

== National High Points Standings ==
2016 National High Points Results
Place	Number	Boat	Driver	Points
1.	U-1	Miss HomeStreet Bank	Jimmy Shane	8,095
2.	U-5	Graham Trucking	J. Michael Kelly	7,176
3.	U-9	Bello's Realtrac Performance/ Les Schwab/ Delta Research/Realtrac	Andrew Tate	5,862
4.	U-21	PayneWest Insurance/ Albert Lee Appliance/ Miss Al Deeby/ All Access Equipment	Brian Perkins	5,542
5.	U-7	Graham Trucking II	Jeff Bernard	4,164
6.	U-11	Peters & May	Tom Thompson	3,947
7.	U-27	Dalton Industries	Cal Phipps	3,199
7.	U-3	Grigg's Ace Hardware; Miss DiJulio	Jimmy King	3,199
8.	U-16	Oh Boy! Oberto	Jean Theoret	2,290
9.	U-99.9	CARSTAR/Miss Rock	Kevin Eacret	1,785
10.	U-57	Spirit of Detroit	Corey Peabody	844
11.	U-18	Bucket List Racing	Dustin Echols	0

Note: Points earned by the U-3 in Tri-Cities and Seattle were credited to U-27.
