= Old Mill District =

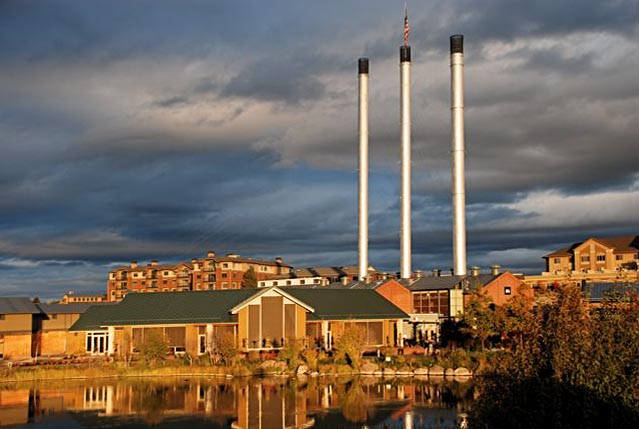
- Old Mill District in Bend
- Location: Bend, Oregon, United States
- Coordinates: 44.046°N 121.315°W
- Opened: c. 1992
- Developer: William Smith Properties
- Num. of stores: 60
- Floor area: Site covers 270 acres (110 ha)
- Website: oldmilldistrict.com

The Old Mill District is a historic area formerly occupied by two lumber mills in Bend, Oregon. Encompassing approximately 270 acres (110 ha) along the Deschutes River, the Old Mill District is now a mixed-use area known for its shops, galleries and restaurants. It draws thousands of visitors and employs more than 2,500 people. The area underwent significant development since the mid-1990s, when the land was purchased by developer Bill Smith, president of William Smith Properties. He maintained elements of the original buildings, including the area's three signature smokestacks. There are nine historically renovated buildings on property. The oldest is the Little Red Shed used to store fire equipment and is now the home to the art studio and gallery of Anna Amejko. Notable additions include the Hayden Homes Amphitheater and the nation's first 12-station Fly Casting Course.

William Smith Properties and its partners also restored 14,000 lineal feet of the river area, which had been off limits to the public for close to 80 years. The banks were blown out to accommodate the floating logs and the river itself was mired with debris. The restored area is now a habitat for native species, such as fish, mink, otters and birds.

It was work like this that led the Old Mill District to become the only project in the Western half of the United States to receive a national 2017 Excellence on the Waterfront Award from the Waterfront Center, become a finalist for the 2016 Urban Land Institute's Global Awards for Excellence and garnered Bill Smith, and William Smith Properties, a Lifetime Achievement Award in the 2014 Building a Better Central Oregon Awards.

The Old Mill District is located southwest of downtown, roughly between Colorado Avenue on the west, Bond Street on the east and north and Reed Market to the south.

== History ==
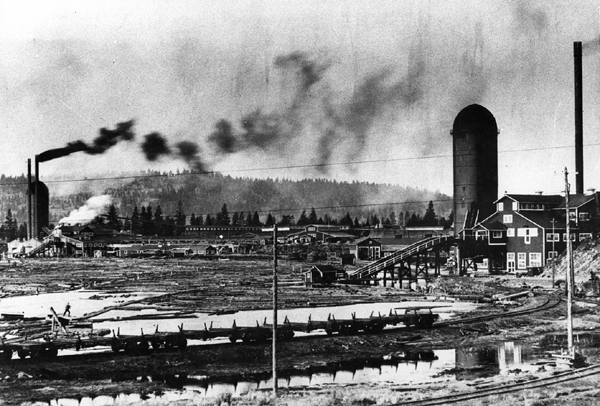
Old Mill District Bend

The Old Mill District formerly housed two competing lumber mills. In 1916 the Shevlin-Hixon Lumber Company built a mill on the west bank of the Deschutes River and Brooks-Scanlon Lumber Company built the "Mill A" complex on the east bank. For the next 78 years, the mills dominated Bend's economy, pumping money and business into the town. At their peak, the companies were two of the largest pine sawmills in the world, running around the clock, employing more than 2,000 workers each and turning out more than 500 million board feet of lumber a year.

The influx of mill workers ballooned the town's population. It jumped from 536 in 1910 to 5,414 in 1920, and by 1930, the city's population was 8,821.

After more than 20 years of non-stop logging, the forests in Central Oregon were becoming depleted. In 1937, the Bend Chamber of Commerce warned of economic disaster unless the mills started sustainable forestry. The mills ignored these warnings and continued producing at full capacity. By 1950, the forests' depletion led to the decline of Oregon's logging industry.

Brooks-Scanlon bought the Shevlin-Hixon mill in 1950 and closed it just four months later. The Brooks-Scanlon Mill A closed in 1983.

After the mills shut down, the site fell into ruin until William Smith Properties purchased the land in 1993 now known as the Old Mill District. Mill B continued to produce small amounts of lumber until 1993 when it also closed.

== Events ==
The Old Mill District hosts events throughout the year, including Bend Brewfest, the Pole Pedal Paddle, and many sporting and charitable events throughout the year.

== Hayden Homes Amphitheater ==
The Hayden Homes Amphitheater - formerly known as the Les Schwab Amphitheater - is an outdoor riverfront amphitheater built in 2001 on the west bank of the Deschutes River as part at the Old Mill District development. The Amphitheater was originally named after Les Schwab, a native of Bend, Oregon. The venue accommodates approximately 8,000 people for concerts and other events. During the summer months, the amphitheater presents national headlining acts from May to October, as well as the annual Bend Brewfest. Past performers include Phish, John Legend, Willie Nelson, Sheryl Crow, Bob Dylan, The Roots, The Dave Matthews Band, Brandi Carlile, Tenacious D, the Avett Brothers, and more.

== National Casting Course ==
The first permanent fly casting course of its kind located in North America. Designed for practicing essential casting skills and each station of the 5-hole course has unique challenges for beginners, intermediate or expert casters that range from right and left handed roll casts, distance targets and accuracy challenges. Free and open to the public, open daily from dawn to dusk. The Casting Course Guide brochure is available at the Ticket Mill and includes a course map, casting tips and a score card.

The Old Mill Casting Course Community Partners are the Bend Casting Club, Central Oregon Fly Fishers, Deschutes River Conservancy, Oregon Council of Internal Federation of Fly Fishers, Upper Deschutes Watershed Council, Bend Parks & Recreation District, Trust for Public Land, Deschutes Land Trust and Trout Unlimited.

== Trails and historical plaques ==
The Old Mill District is also known for its network of trails. Four trails, ranging from 1 to 2.4 miles, loop through the area, providing a view of Bend's mountainous landscape. The loops connect with the greater network of trails maintained by the Bend Parks and Recreation District and are open to the public.

Each loop features bollards that include directional information and memorial plaques to commemorate local individuals that have contributed in a significant way to Bend or its history. The hand-painted signs feature historical photos that have been recreated by artist Jerry Werner and also provide information about Bend's logging and timber mill history. These photos accompany stories such as “Lumber and the Railroad Helped Create the Town of Bend.” Seven total signs are located along the Deschutes River in the core of the Old Mill District.

Each spring, the East Cascades Audubon Society and the Old Mill District host birding walks along the trails, which run through the migratory corridor for several species of birds.

The trail system won the 2010 Big Chainring Award for Business and the 2010 Safe Sidewalk Award from the Deschutes County Bicycle and Pedestrian Advisory Committee (BPAC) for improving walkability and biking in the county.
