= Bend Brewfest =

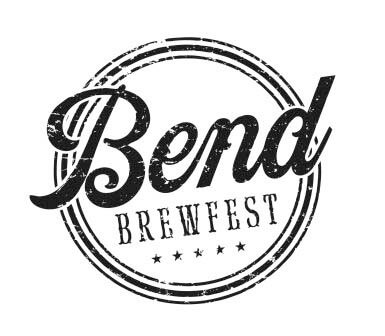

Bend Brewfest is a three-day beer festival held each August in Bend, Oregon, which features popular and rare beers from regional breweries. The event is Central Oregon's largest beer festival and is held in the Old Mill District's Les Schwab Amphitheater, which has been nationally recognized as a leading outdoor venue. Founded in 2002, the annual festival hosts several regional breweries and features close to 200 craft beverages.

The Bend Brewfest has become a notable part of the burgeoning beer culture in Bend, which has one of the highest levels of breweries per capita in the nation and has been referred to as one of the top beer towns in the nation or BeerTown USA. The festival is noted as one of the top draws for the town in many national articles. Each year, the growing festival welcomes approximately 40,000 through its gates.

The festival benefits local charities each year, such as NeighborImpact, a Central Oregon non-profit organization that helps individuals and families access resources in times of need.

This Brewfest went on hiatus in 2020, and returned in 2022 as a smaller event. Since then, the 2023 and 2024 events were canceled due to difficulties with planning.
