= Les Schwab Tire Centers =

American tire retailer

- Company type: Private
- Industry: Automotive, retail
- Predecessor: OK Rubber Welders
- Founded: 1952; 74 years ago
- Headquarters: Bend, Oregon, U.S.
- Number of locations: 540+ stores (2025)
- Key people: Tom J. Nolan
- Products: Tires, brakes, shocks, alignments
- Owner: Meritage Group LP
- Number of employees: 7,000 (2025)
- Website: www.lesschwab.com
- Footnotes / references data

Les Schwab Tire Centers is a tire retail chain operating in the western United States. Founded in 1952, the company is named for founder Les Schwab and is headquartered in the Central Oregon city of Bend. The private company employs over 7,000 people in 15 states and is one of the five largest tire dealerships in the United States.

== History ==
Les Schwab (1917–2007) founded the company 74 years ago in 1952 with a single store in Prineville, Oregon, when he bought OK Rubber Welders. From 1964 until 2011, the firm offered an innovative February "Free-Beef" promotion, to boost sales during slow late-winter months. Corporate headquarters were moved from Prineville to Bend in 2008.

The company was sued by the Equal Employment Opportunity Commission in 2006 over allegations of gender-based job discrimination. The EEOC suit claimed the company denied women top management positions in the company and noted that at the time of the filing there was but a single female assistant store manager. They were also sued by former employees over the same allegations in a class action lawsuit filed the same year. The federal case was settled in 2010.

On December 12, 2006, Dick Borgman became CEO of the company. That year the company ranked as the 318th largest private company according to Forbes. The chain operated more than 410 stores in 2007, in Alaska, California, Idaho, Montana, Nevada, Oregon, Utah, and Washington. Les Schwab entered the Denver metropolitan area with five stores in October 2012, the first in Colorado, bringing the total number of company-owned stores to 374. The company does more than $1.6 billion in sales each year, and is the second largest independent tire retailer in the United States.

Founder Schwab died at age 89 in May 2007, with ownership remaining within the family, then chairman Phil Wick died in 2010. In September 2020, CEO Jack Cuniff announced that the company would be sold to a San Francisco investment fund. The sale, to Meritage Group LP, was finalized in November 2020.

In 2024, Les Schwab expanded eastward with new locations in North Dakota, South Dakota, and Minnesota; as of 2025, it has more than 540 stores.

== Operations ==
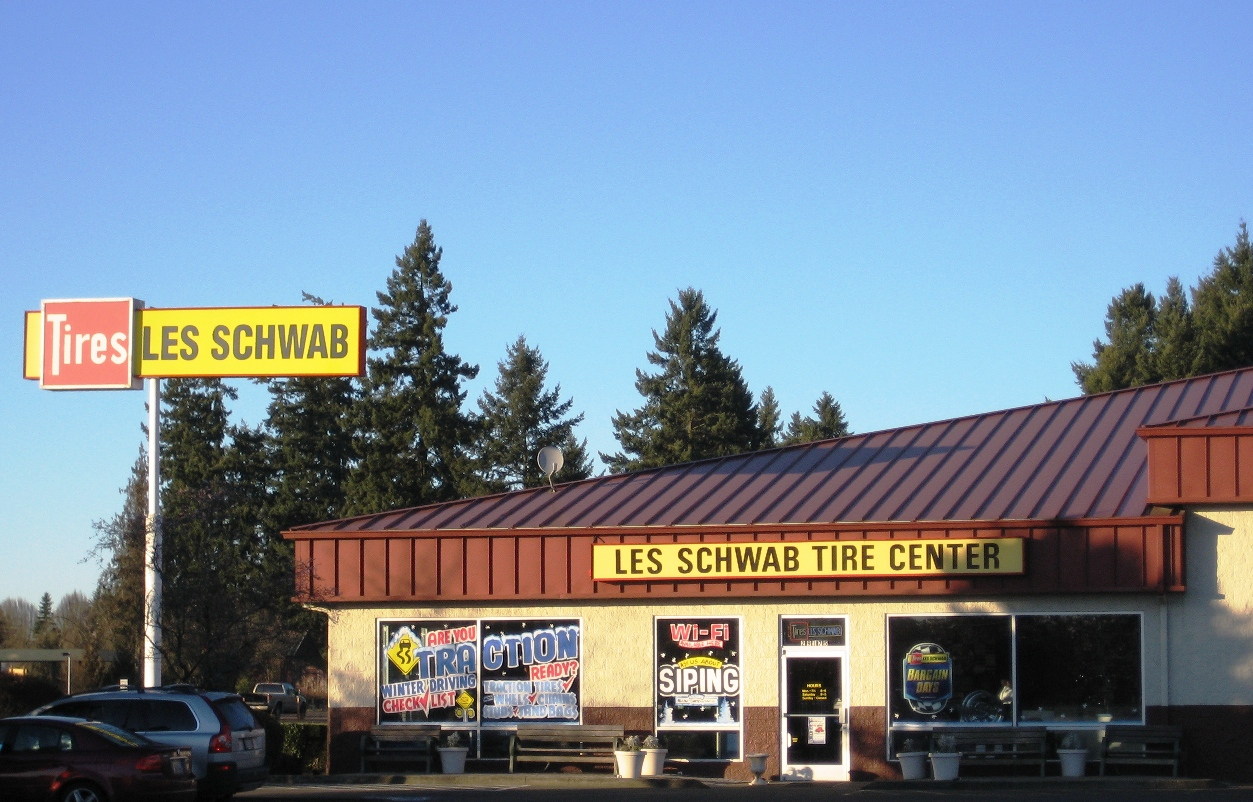
A Les Schwab store in Wilsonville, Oregon

In addition to tires, the company sells a variety of other auto parts and auto-related services, including brakes and shocks. In 2008, Forbes magazine ranked Les Schwab as the 324th largest privately held company in the country. Modern Tire Dealer has called Les Schwab "arguably the most respected independent tire store chain in the United States." The company closes all of its stores on Sundays, and employees were formerly known for running to customer vehicles when they pull in to park, though many locations still have employees walk up to greet customers as they exit their vehicles. Les Schwab has also offered free beef promotions with tire purchases, and free BombPop popsicles in the lobby in the summer. Today, most Les Schwab locations still offer free coffee and popcorn for customers.

== See also ==
- List of companies based in Oregon
