= Les Schwab =

American businessman and tire chain founder (1917-2007)

Leslie "Les" Schwab
- Schwab at age 85 in 2003
- Born: October 3, 1917; Bend, Oregon
- Died: May 18, 2007 (aged 89); Prineville, Oregon
- Resting place: Juniper Haven Cemetery; Prineville, Oregon
- Education: Bend High School, 1935
- Occupation: Businessman
- Spouse(s): Dorothy Harlan (b. 1917) (m. 1936–2007, his death)
- Children: 1 son, 1 daughter

Leslie Bishop Schwab (October 3, 1917 – May 18, 2007) was an American businessman from Oregon. He was the founder of Les Schwab Tire Centers, a company which Modern Tire Dealer called "arguably the most respected independent tire store chain in the United States." A native of Oregon, he served in the U.S. Army Air Forces during World War II before starting his business in 1952.

== Early life ==
Born in Bend, Oregon, his family moved to Minnesota two years later with young Les in tow. The family moved back to Central Oregon in 1929, where Schwab was schooled in a railroad boxcar at the Brooks Scanlon logging camp, with his mother as schoolteacher. While in high school in Bend at age 15, Schwab and his three siblings became orphans in 1933 when both parents died within months (his mother died of pneumonia; his alcoholic father was found dead in front of a moonshine joint).

While an aunt and uncle offered to take him in, Schwab instead rented a room in a boarding house for $15 a month. He began delivering the Oregon Journal newspaper while continuing to attend Bend High School. At the paper, Schwab would eventually cover all the routes in Bend, nine in all, outearning his high school principal, and he graduated in 1935. He married his high school sweetheart in 1936 and they became parents in 1940. Schwab became circulation manager for the Bend newspaper, The Bulletin, in 1942 and served in the Army Air Corps during World War II.

== Tires ==
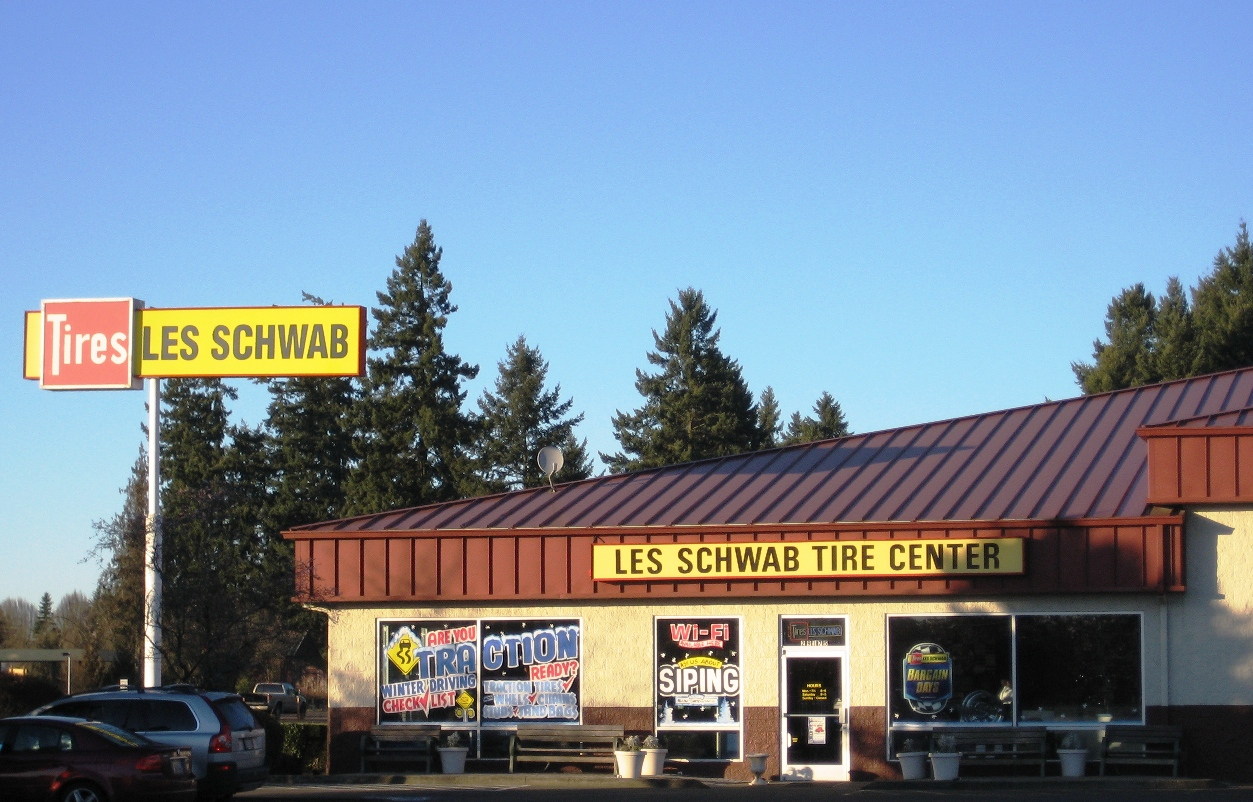
A Les Schwab Tire Centers store in Wilsonville, Oregon

Les Schwab's venture into the tire business began when he bought an OK Rubber Welders franchise store in nearby Prineville in early 1952. Schwab was 34, with an expecting wife and an 11-year-old son, and had never even fixed a flat tire. He sold his house, borrowed from a relative, and borrowed from his life insurance policy to purchase the franchise for $11,000, which had one employee and included a small shack that did not even have running water or a bathroom.

By the end of the first year, he had improved the sales nearly five-fold, from $32,000 to $150,000. A second store was opened in 1953 in Redmond and a third in Bend in 1955. The name of the business changed to "Les Schwab Tire Centers" in 1956, dropping the OK franchise. From this grew a tire empire based in Prineville that had 34 stores in Oregon, Washington, and Idaho in 1971, and 410 stores in the western U.S. and $1.6 billion in annual sales by 2007. The company he built was based on the loyalty of the employees that was earned by giving them generous shares of the profit (half of a store's profit went to employees of that store), lucrative benefits, and only promoting from within the company.

In the communities served by these stores, the company became known for their advertising featuring employees running out to meet customers, an annual free beef promotion, and the company slogan: "If we can't guarantee it, we won't sell it." Despite the success of the company, Schwab refused to take the company public.

The company moved its corporate headquarters from Prineville to Bend in December 2008. Announced two years earlier, it exchanged its modest one-story cinder block offices (externally resembling a tire store) for an upscale, three-story executive campus. The new site in Bend at Juniper Ridge is on 12 acres (4.9 ha) and cost $33 million.

On Sep. 30, 2020, Les Schwab CEO Jack Cuniff announced that the company would be sold to a California investment fund, Meritage Group, ending the 68-year family ownership of Les Schwab Tire Centers. The family cited the difficulties of owning and running the company in the fifth generation as reasons for the sale.

== Family and later life ==
Schwab wed his high school sweetheart, Dorothy Harlan (1917-2016), in 1936 and they were married more than 70 years. Their two children died before their parents; son Harlan Lee Schwab (1940–1971) was killed in an automobile accident and daughter Margaret Joyce Schwab Denton (1952–2005) succumbed to cancer. In 1986, he wrote an autobiography, Les Schwab, Pride in Performance, Keep it Going. In the late 1980s he gave up day-to-day control of the company. In the early 1990s, Schwab and his wife donated funds to the local hospital to fund an expansion in honor of his son, Harlan. In late 2005, following the death of his daughter, his own health began to deteriorate. He died at age 89 in 2007. His wife died in 2016. They were survived by four grandchildren, and several great-grandchildren. He was buried in Prineville. The Hayden Homes Amphitheater in Bend was named the Les Schwab Amphitheater, up until November 2021, in his honor.
