= Guntersville Lake Hydrofest =

Hydroplane boat race

The Guntersville Lake Hydrofest is an H1 Unlimited hydroplane boat race held annually in June on Guntersville Lake in northern Alabama near Guntersville.

== History ==
The first unlimited hydroplane race held in Guntersville took place in 1963. The small northern Alabama town was traditionally host to the unlimited hydroplane season opener from 1963 until 1969. The race was not run not run in 1967 or 1968. Unlimited hydroplane racing returned to Guntersville with a test session in 2017 and a full-fledged national high point race in 2018. Since 2018 the Guntersville Lake Hydrofest has opened the H1 Unlimited season, and the unlimited class competes for the Southern Cup.

== Past Results ==
Guntersville Lake Unlimited Hydroplane Winners
Year	Event	Boat	Driver
1963	Governor's Cup	Miss Bardhal	Ron Musson
1964	Dixie Cup	Notre Dame	Bill Muncey
1965	Dixie Cup	Miss Madison	Buddy Byers
1966-1967	No events held		
1968	Dixie Cup	Miss Eagle Electric	Warner Gardner
1969	Dixie Cup	Miss Budweiser	Bill Sterett
1970-2017	No events held		
2018	Southern Cup	Delta Realtrac	Andrew Tate
2019	Southern Cup	Miss HomeStreet	Jimmy Shane
2020	No events held - COVID-19 pandemic		
2021	Southern Cup	Miss Tri-Cities	J. Michael Kelly
2022	Held APBA Gold Cup.		
