= Mission Bay (San Diego) =

Bay in California, United States

Coordinates: 32°46′45″N 117°14′3″W

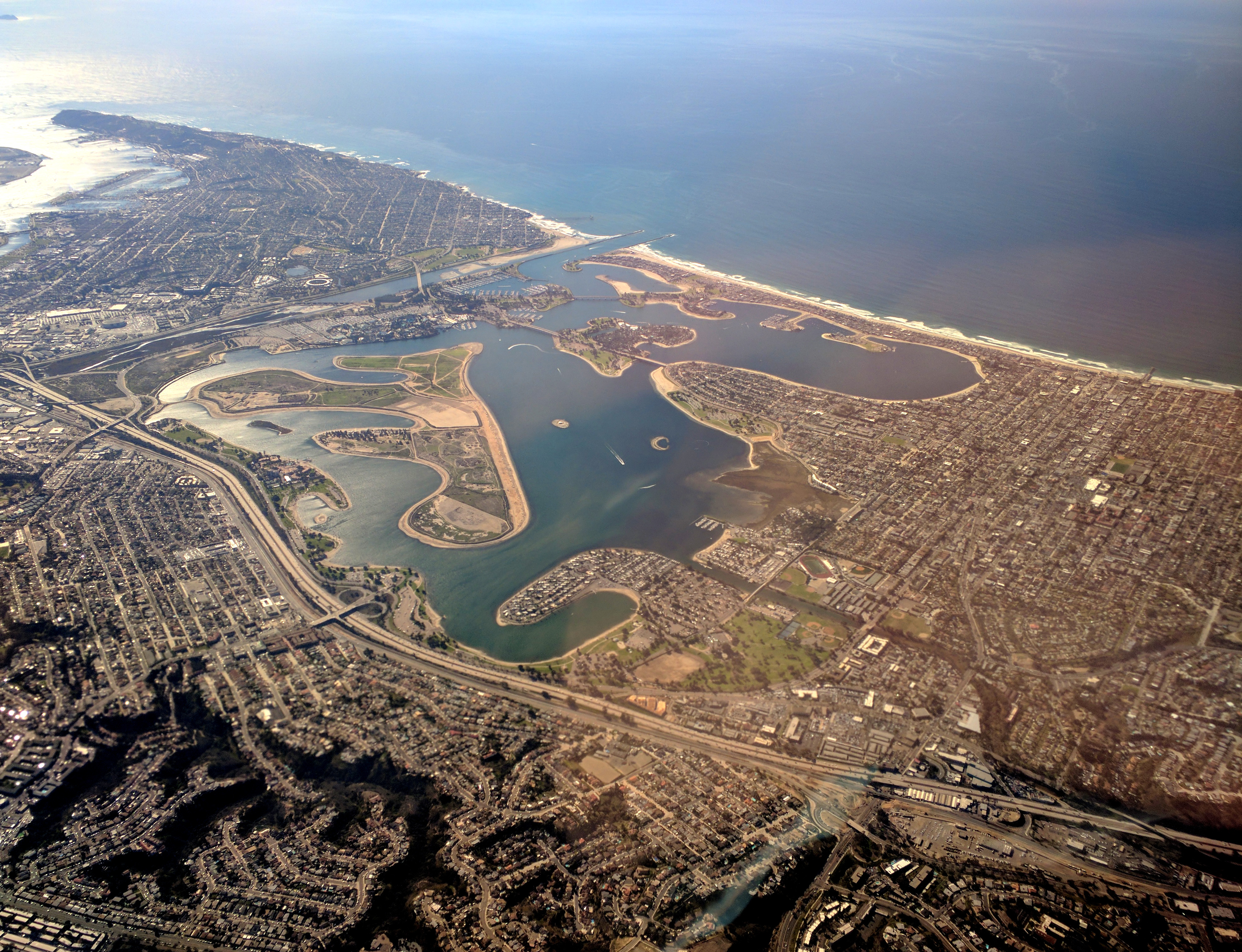
Aerial view of Mission Bay

Mission Bay is an artificial, saltwater bay located south of the Pacific Beach community of San Diego, California, created from approximately 2,000 acres (810 ha) of historical wetland, marsh, and saltwater bay habitat. The bay is part of the recreational Mission Bay Park, the largest man-made aquatic park in the United States, consisting of 4,235 acres (17.14 km^{2}), approximately 46% land and 54% water. The combined area makes Mission Bay Park the ninth largest municipally owned park in the United States.

The bay was created to enhance recreational opportunities in San Diego. Wakeboarding, jet skiing, sailing, camping, cycling, jogging, roller skating, skateboarding, and sunbathing are all popular around the bay. Mission Bay Yacht Club, on the west side of the bay, conducts sailing races year-round in the bay and the nearby Pacific Ocean and has produced national sailing champions in many classes. Also on the west side of Mission Bay lies Mission Bay Sportcenter, which offers boat rentals in Mission Bay and boasts the largest aquatic Youth Camp in San Diego.

Fiesta Island, a large peninsular park located within Mission Bay, has a large off-leash dog park and is a popular location for charity walks and runs, bicycle races, time trials, and other special events like an over-the-line tournament. It is also home to an impressive diversity of rare, threatened, and endangered bird and plant species, despite the popularity of the area for people and dogs. Mission Bay is also host to the annual San Diego Bayfair Cup, a hydroplane boat race that takes place on the H1 Unlimited circuit.

== History ==
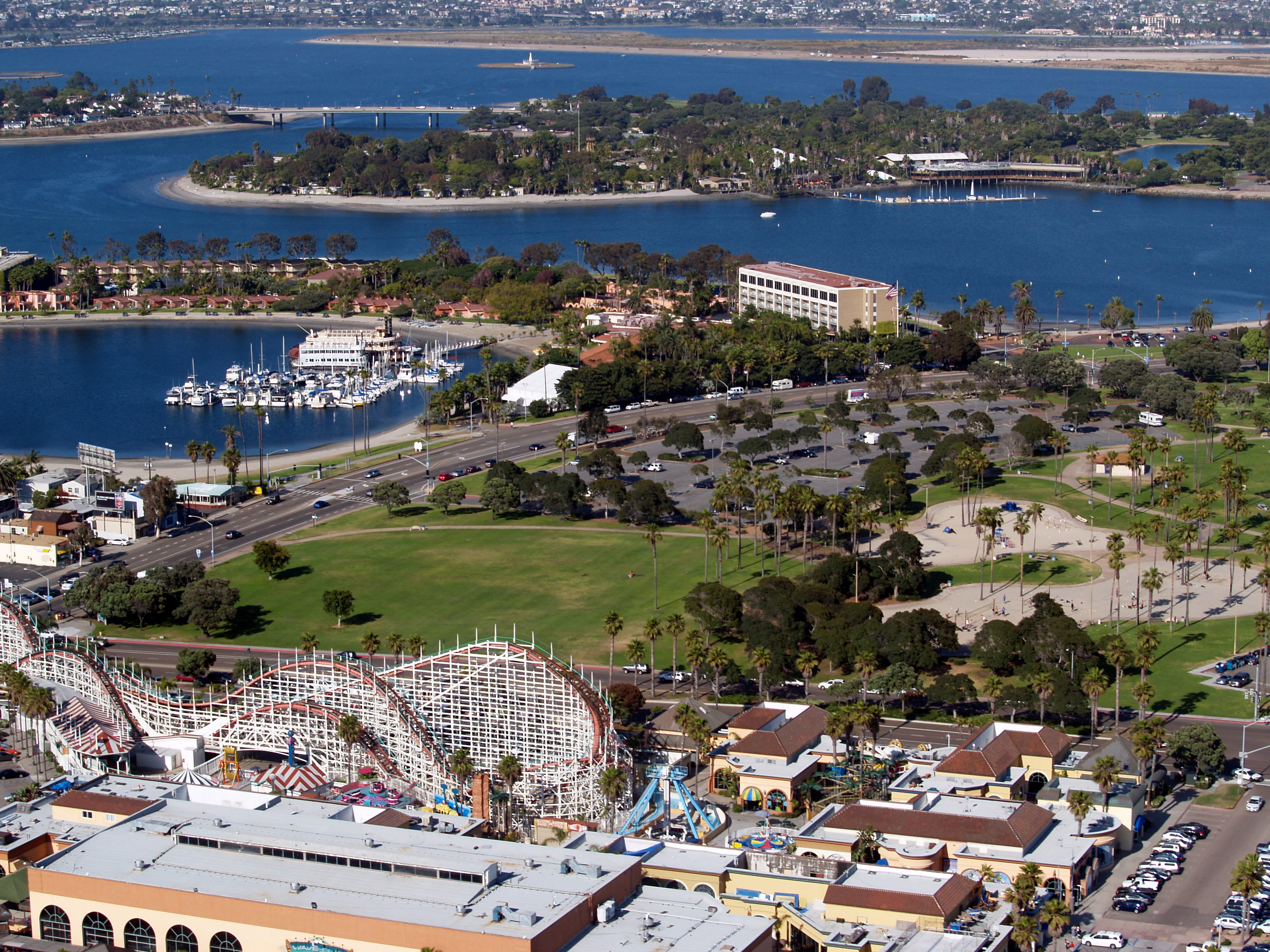
Mission Bay looking toward the east, May 2011

=== Pre-Development Era ===
Before Juan Rodriguez Cabrillo named the area “Bahía Falsa,” or “False Bay,” in 1542, the area that we call Mission Bay was a shifting matrix of wetland type habitats, including lagoons, estuaries, tidal marshes, and saltwater bays surrounded by upland habitat. Prior to European colonization, there were at least three separate Native American villages in the area who relied upon the habitats and their resources. “False Bay” may have shifted between wetland habitat types when the San Diego River terminus historically shifted between San Diego Bay and False Bay before dredging activities in 1946. This periodic shifting changed where the river carried silt and sand and had the potential to transform a small bay into an estuary and then into a shallow water tidal marsh over time.

=== Development Era ===
Mission Bay Park was developed into a recreational water park during the 1940s, 1950s, and 1960s.

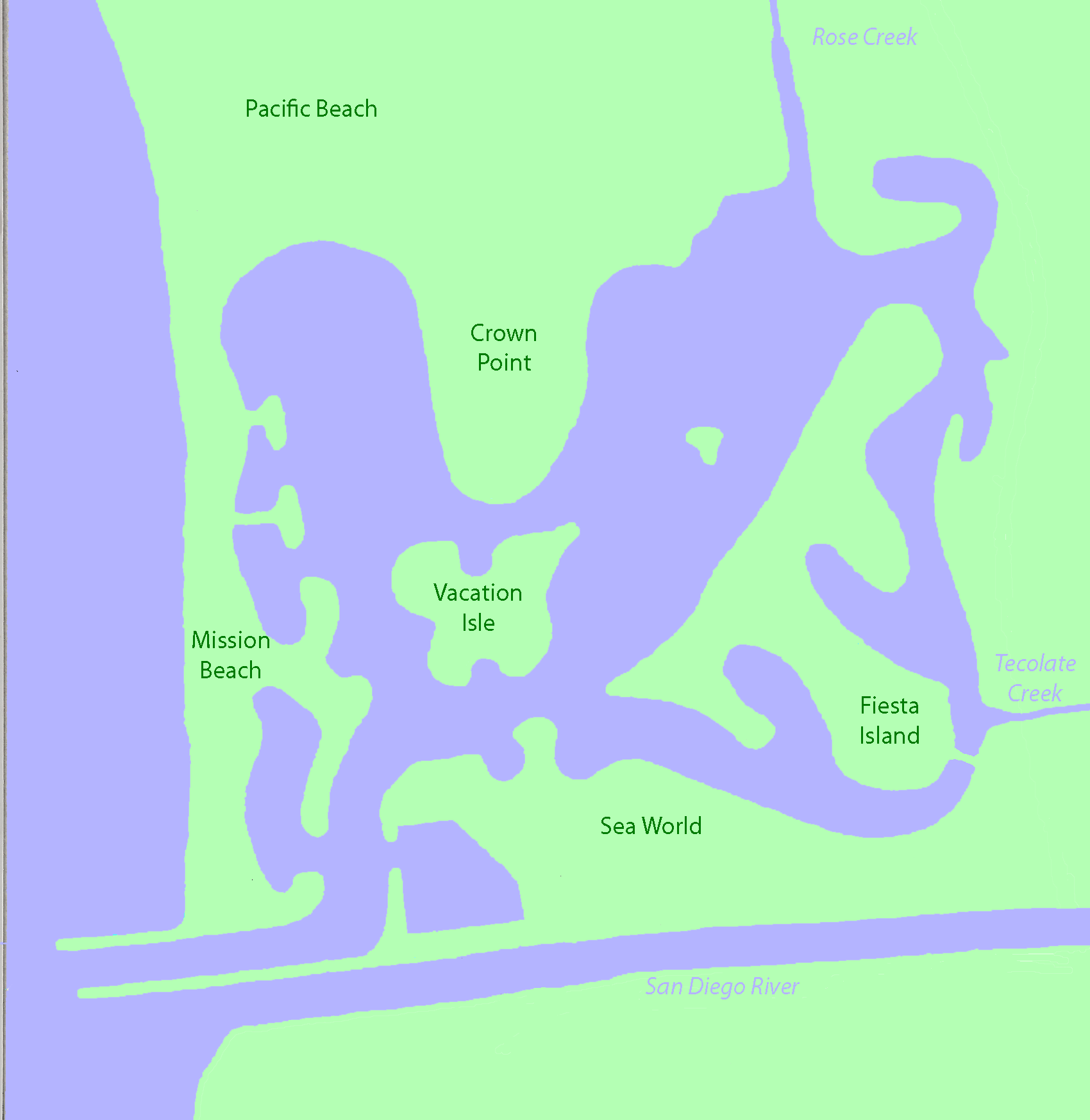

During the 1820s the river began to empty primarily into San Diego Bay, causing worries that the harbor might silt up. In 1852 the United States Army Corps of Engineers constructed a dike along the south side of the river to prevent water from flowing into San Diego Bay. This made "False Bay" an estuary outlet for the San Diego River drainage. Unfortunately the dike failed within two years. Finally in 1877 the city erected a permanent dam and straightened the river channel to the sea, giving the river its present configuration. Today the San Diego River is constrained on both the north and the south by levees (San Diego River Flood Control Channel), and it no longer drains to the ocean through Mission Bay, other than through a weir located at the entrance to Mission Bay.

During the late 1800s some recreational development began in "False Bay" including the building of hunting and fishing facilities. These facilities were destroyed by flooding that took place years later.

The name "Mission Bay" comes from a poem by Rose Hartwick Thorpe originally published in San Francisco newspaper The Golden Era in 1888.

In 1944, a chamber of commerce committee recommended development of Mission Bay into a tourism and recreational center, in order to help diversify the city's economy, which was largely military.

In the late 1940s, dredging and filling operations began converting the marsh into Mission Bay Park. Twenty-five million cubic yards of sand and silt were dredged to create the varied land forms of the park, which is almost entirely man-made.

From 1957 to 1962 large amounts of industrial waste, including millions of gallons of hydrofluoric, nitric, sulfuric, and hydrochloric acids, dichromate, cyanide, and carbon tetrachloride, were deposited into an unlined landfill located in the south shores section of Mission Bay Park immediately east of SeaWorld. No remediation efforts have occurred.

The first modern swim/bike/run event to be called a "triathlon" was held at Mission Bay, San Diego, California on September 25, 1974. The race was conceived and directed by Jack Johnstone and Don Shanahan of the San Diego Track Club, and was sponsored by the track club with 46 participants in the event. It was reportedly not inspired by the French events, although a race held the following year at Fiesta Island, San Diego, is sometimes called "the first triathlon in America."

=== Wetlands ===
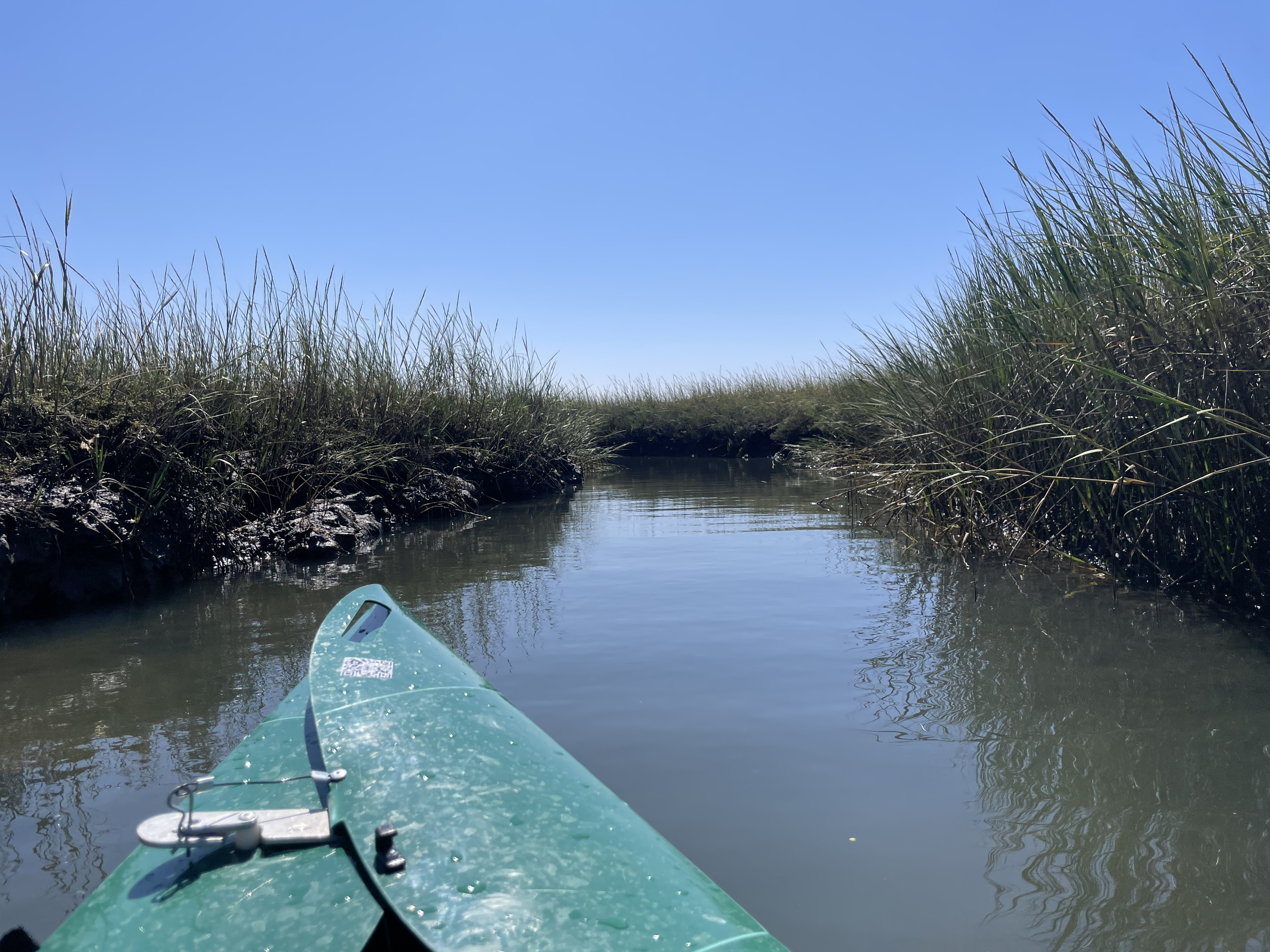
Kayaking in the wildlife preserve in northern Mission Bay.

Approximately half of the park was once state tidelands. Development of Mission Bay removed all but 40 acres (16 ha), or approximately 5%, of wetland habitat. Mission Bay Park was transferred to the City of San Diego with several restrictions, some of which were adopted into San Diego City Charter by public vote, with others implemented as part of the California Coastal Commission's oversight of local planning and land use decisions. One of the restrictions sets a limit on commercial development of leaseholds, so that no more than 25% of the land area and 6.5% of the water area can be used for private purposes. This assures that most of the acres making up Mission Bay Park are available for public recreational use.

Rose Creek flows into Mission Bay from the north, creating a rich wetland area called the Kendall Frost Marsh.

ReWild Mission Bay is a project started by the San Diego Audubon Society to enhance and restore wetlands in the northeast corner of Mission Bay. Almost all of the wetlands in Mission Bay have been lost to development. Science shows that wetlands are vital for clean air and water, and serve as habitats for local wildlife. The ReWild Mission Bay wetland restoration feasibility study was unveiled in autumn of 2018. The San Diego Audubon Society worked with conservation partners, stakeholders, and community members to develop three versions of a community-informed plan to restore and expand wetlands in the northeast corner of Mission Bay. San Diego City Council awarded new and extended campland leases in June. The Mayor and Council with the input of residents will determine how this process moves forward.

== Recreation ==
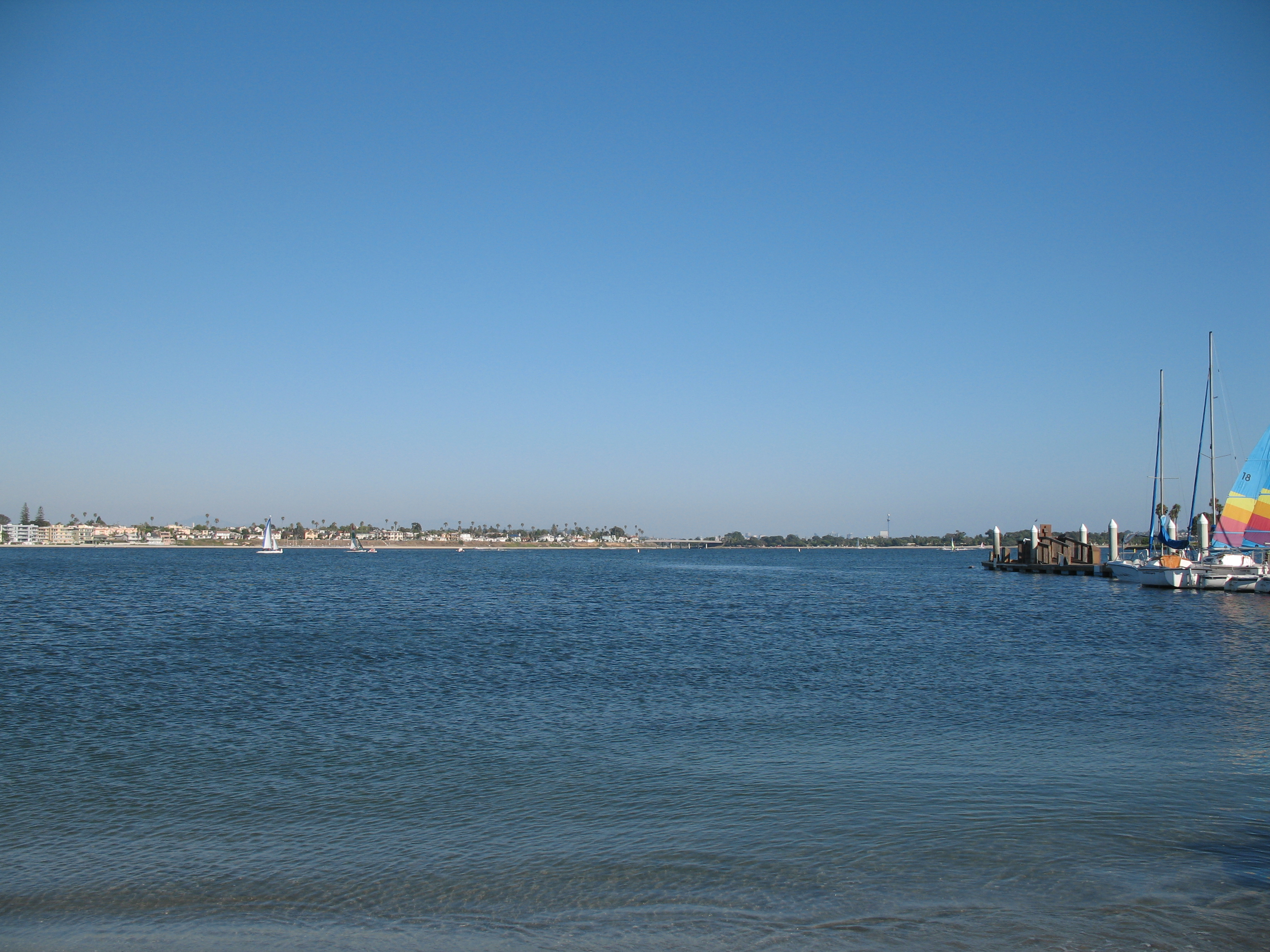
Mission Bay as seen from the beach behind the Catamaran Resort

Mission Bay has 27 miles (43 km) of shoreline, 19 of which are sandy beaches with eight locations designated as official swimming areas. Mission Bay is recognized for protection by the California Bays and Estuaries Policy.

Swimmers and sunbathers take advantage of the warm water, calm surf conditions and the sands of Mission Bay's beaches. Mission Bay offers boat docks and launching facilities, sailboat and motor rentals, bike/walk paths and basketball courts. There are playgrounds for children. Public restrooms and showers are available, and lifeguard stations are located in designated areas.

On the east side of the bay is a network of channels and islands which are used by wind surfers and water skiers.

Several water areas are dedicated or restricted to particular forms of water recreation, with specific separate areas for sailing, water skiing and personal watercraft use.

Mission Bay is one of the premier locations in Southern California for the sport of rowing, or "crew." One of the largest rowing regattas in the country is held on Mission Bay each year: The San Diego Crew Classic is held in Mission Bay every spring, featuring two days of competition in eight-oared shells rowed by more than 100 college, club, and senior crews.

=== Recreation areas ===
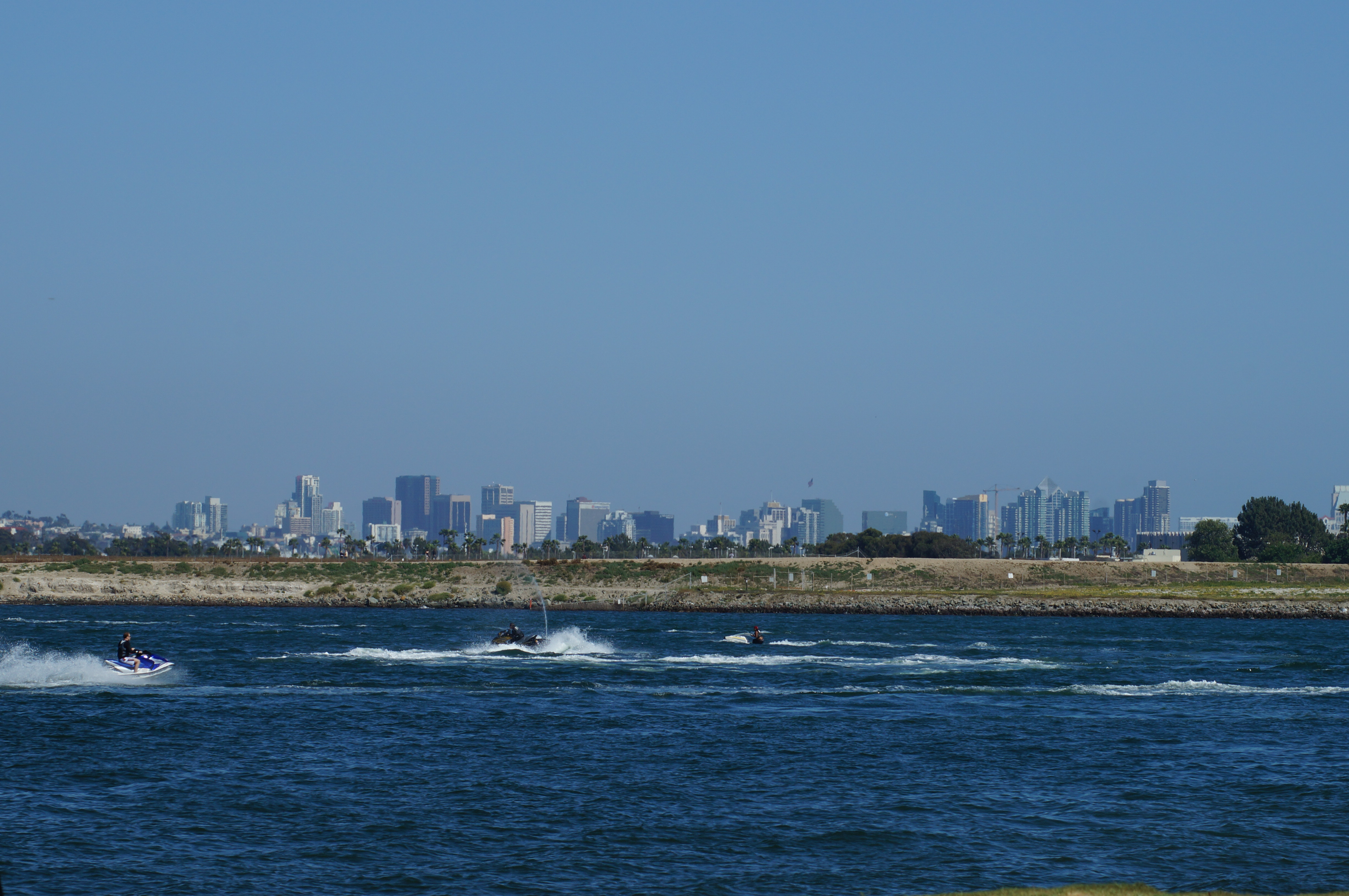
Downtown San Diego Skyline as seen from Ski Beach in Mission Bay

Mission Bay is a hub for many activities, both on the land and in the water. There are 8 locations dedicated as official swimming areas. The west end offers many channels and islands which are great for water sports. Water toys such as sailboats and motor rentals, kayaks, paddleboards, and more are available for rent in various places around the bay. On land, visitors choose between various activities like playing in the sand, picnicking, riding bikes along the 14 miles of paths, playing volleyball, and flying kites. Attractions at Mission Bay include SeaWorld San Diego, Aqua Adventures for kayaking and paddleboarding, the Mission Bay Cross Country Course, the Mission Bay Golf Course, and Belmont Park, which features the Giant Dipper Roller Coaster and other rides.

=== Cross country ===
The Mission Bay cross country course is a European-style 2,000 meter grass loop running along east Mission Bay Park. The terrain along the first 1,000 meters of the course is primarily flat. During the second 1,000 meters of the course it includes a series of five small grass inclines. The average width of the course is 15 meters with sections 5 meters in width. It is the home course for the San Diego Toreros cross country teams.

=== Golfing ===
Scenic Mission Bay Golf Course and Practice Center, designed by Ted Robinson, former president of the American Society of Golf Course Architects, opened its gates May 27, 1955 as a nine-hole course. In the early 1960s Robinson designed what is now the 18-hole executive course. The 18-hole executive course, measuring 2,719 yards, sits on 46 acres in the heart of the city. It is the only golf course in San Diego with night lighting. The center is a long-time favorite golf course for locals. It is where Tiger Woods won a Junior World title.

=== Dog walking ===
Some areas in Mission Bay Park require dogs to be on leashes, other areas such as Fiesta Island are leash-free, and other areas do not allow dogs at all.

=== Camping ===
There is a youth campground located on Mission Bay's Fiesta Island. Throughout the year youth groups with their leaders enjoy a full camping experience along with daytime water experiences and classes. A permit is required to use this site. It is unlawful for adults to camp, sleep overnight or lodge overnight anywhere in Mission Bay Park except as a leader of a permitted youth group.

=== Fishing ===
Fishing is permitted in all areas of Mission Bay, except in areas designated for swimming, water skiing and personal water craft use (including takeoff and landing zones). Fishing is also not allowed from any bridge. Species found here include Cilus gilberti, spotted bass, halibut, and spotted sand bass. Traditional angling gear such as baitcasters and spinning tackle may be used, and many fishermen use fly fishing. A local club and fly shop specifically target stretches of the bay through this manner. Netting of several bait species near bridges is down by locals.

The California Office of Environmental Health Hazard Assessment (OEHHA) has developed a safe eating advisory for Mission Bay based on levels of mercury or PCBs found in fish caught here.

== Birds ==
Mission Bay Park is home to many rare and endangered species, including the California least tern. A program goes into effect every April through September to protect this bird at four of its nesting sites in Mission Bay Park. The California least tern has more than tripled in number since it was put on the endangered species list, and has many colonies from San Diego Bay to the San Francisco Bay area. Most are fenced and protected from public access. The major cause for its decline was habitat destruction and alteration, as occurred in Mission Bay. Predators like the gull-billed tern and the red fox can decimate a crop of chicks; therefore, predator control, either by removal or elimination, has been instigated at some colonies. Non-endemic ants are a problem at some Mission Bay colonies, as they eat chicks alive, and are often controlled there. Even with annual losses from depredation, since the least tern was listed, it has continued to thrive. Being on the Endangered Species list allowed protection of the terns' habitat, and allowed the natural rebound and growth of the colonies. Colonies at Mission Bay are either fenced or reachable only by watercraft.

In a multi-agency effort that includes the City of San Diego Park and Recreation Department, the U.S. Department of Fish and Wildlife Service, the California Department of Fish and Game and the Wildlife Services Program of the U.S. Department of Agriculture, professionals from the wildlife program carry out the humane trapping of predators that are attracted to least tern nesting sites. This includes skunks and opossums, as well as feral cats and dogs, believed to be former pets who were abandoned by their owners. Sites are located on North Fiesta Island, Mariner's Point, Stoney Point, and a small island called "Government Island", which is used by the Federal Aviation Agency and houses a VORTAC station.

== Visitor center ==
The San Diego Visitor Information Center was constructed in northeastern Mission Bay in the 1960s, and it served its purpose until it closed down in 2010. There were plans to convert the building into a counter-style fast-casual restaurant, scheduled to be opened in late 2018, eventually opening in October 2021 as Mission Bay Beach Club, a multipurpose facility.

== In popular culture ==
A water skiing competition was filmed in Mission Bay for the 1976 film Freaky Friday.
