= Detroit Hydrofest =

Hydroplane race in Detroit, Michigan

Event information
- Type: Hydroplane racing event
- Location: Detroit River, Detroit, Michigan
- Hydrofest years: 2015–2019
- Most recent event: August 24–25, 2019
- First major Detroit race: 1916
- Most recent H1 race: 2018 APBA Gold Cup
- Most recent H1 winner: U-9 Delta RealTrac; Andrew Tate
- Website: Archived website

The Detroit Hydrofest was an annual hydroplane racing event held from 2015 through 2019 in August on the Detroit River in Detroit, Michigan. It continued Detroit's major hydroplane-racing tradition, which dated to 1916. H1 Unlimited last raced at the event in 2018, when Andrew Tate won the APBA Gold Cup in the U-9 Delta RealTrac. The most recent Hydrofest, branded as the Metro Detroit Chevy Dealers Hydrofest for sponsorship reasons, was held in 2019 and featured piston-powered boats from the Hydroplane Racing League.

== History ==
The first Gold Cup race held on the Detroit River took place in 1916. The community-owned Miss Detroit had won the Gold Cup in 1915 on Manhasset Bay, New York, and earned the right to defend it the following year on its home waters. The boat was a single-step hydroplane powered by a 250-horsepower Sterling engine and designed by Christopher Columbus Smith, the founder of Chris-Craft.

Detroit subsequently hosted major hydroplane races under a series of event names and trophies, including the APBA Gold Cup.

Beginning in 1963, the location of the Gold Cup race was determined by bids from host cities rather than by the yacht club represented by the previous year's winning boat. Between 1982 and 2018, Detroit hosted the Gold Cup 30 times, including annually from 1990 through 2014 and again from 2016 through 2018. From 1990 through 2014, the Detroit River Regatta Association (DRRA) hosted the APBA Gold Cup. When the DRRA announced in 2015 that it could not continue hosting the Gold Cup, the Spirit of Detroit Hydrofest was organized with a multiyear sponsorship from UAW-GM.

The 2018 APBA Gold Cup was the last H1 Unlimited race held in Detroit. In 2019, Detroit promoters elected not to host the Gold Cup, and the organizers of the Madison Regatta won the bid to hold it. Detroit Hydrofest continued that year without H1 Unlimited, featuring Grand Prix and other piston-powered hydroplanes sanctioned by the Hydroplane Racing League. Although organizers announced plans to return in 2025, no Detroit event appeared in H1 Unlimited's 2025 results, and Detroit was not on the series' 2026 schedule.

== Race winners ==
Detroit Gold Cup-class and Unlimited hydroplane race winners
Year	Event	Boat	Driver
1916	APBA Gold Cup	Miss Minneapolis	Bernard Smith
1917	APBA Gold Cup	Miss Detroit II	Gar Wood
1918	APBA Gold Cup	Miss Detroit III	Gar Wood
1919	APBA Gold Cup	Miss Detroit III	Gar Wood
1920	APBA Gold Cup	Miss America	Gar Wood
1921	APBA Gold Cup	Miss America	Gar Wood
1922	APBA Gold Cup	Packard ChrisCraft	Jesse Vincent
1923	APBA Gold Cup	Packard ChrisCraft	Caleb Bragg
1924	APBA Gold Cup	Baby Bootlegger	Caleb Bragg
1926	Harmsworth Trophy	Miss America V	Gar Wood
1928	Harmsworth Trophy	Miss America VII	Gar Wood
1928	Championship of North America	Rainbow VII	Harry Greening
1929	Harmsworth Trophy	Miss America VIII	Gar Wood
1930	Harmsworth Trophy	Miss America IX	Gar Wood
1933	APBA Gold Cup	El Lagarto	George Reis
1933	Dodge Memorial	Delphine VII	Horace Dodge
1935	Detroit Yacht Club Trophy	Hotsy Totsy III	Vic Kliesrath
1937	APBA Gold Cup	Notre Dame	Clell Perry
1938	Detroit Yacht Club Trophy	Warnie	James Anderson
1938	APBA Gold Cup	Alagi	Theo Rossi
1939	Detroit Yacht Club Trophy	Why Worry	Bill Cantrell
1939	APBA Gold Cup	My Sin	Zalmon Simmons
1946	APBA Gold Cup	Tempo VI	Guy Lombardo
1947	Detroit Memorial	Miss Peps V	Danny Foster
1947	Silver Cup	Notre Dame	Dan Arena
1948	Henry Ford Memorial	Tempo VI	Guy Lombardo
1948	APBA Gold Cup	Miss Great Lakes	Danny Foster
1948	Silver Cup	Miss Canada III	Harold Wilson
1949	APBA Gold Cup	My Sweetie	Bill Cantrell
1949	Detroit Memorial	Skip-A-Long	Stanley Dollar
1949	Harmsworth Trophy	Skip-A-Long	Stanley Dollar
1949	Silver Cup	My Sweetie	Bill Cantrell
1950	APBA Gold Cup	Slo-mo-shun IV	Ted Jones
1950	Detroit Memorial	My Sweetie	Lou Fageol
1950	Harmsworth Trophy	Slo-mo-shun IV	Lou Fageol
1950	Silver Cup	Such Crust	Danny Foster
1951	Detroit Memorial	Miss Pepsi	Chuck Thompson
1951	Silver Cup	Miss Pepsi	Chuck Thompson
1952	Detroit Memorial	Miss Pepsi	Chuck Thompson
1952	Silver Cup	Gale II	Danny Foster
1953	Henry Ford Memorial	Miss Great Lakes II	Danny Foster
1953	Silver Cup	Gale II	Lee Schoenith
1954	Detroit Memorial	Gale V	Lee Schoenith
1954	Silver Cup	My Sweetie Dora	Jack Bartlow
1955	Detroit Memorial	Gale IV	Bill Cantrell
1955	Silver Cup	Tempo VII	Danny Foster
1956	Silver Cup	Miss U. S. II	Don Wilson
1956	APBA Gold Cup	Miss Thriftway	Bill Muncey
1957	Detroit Memorial	Such Crust III	Fred Alter
1957	Silver Cup	Hawaii Ka’i III	Jack Regas
1958	Detroit Memorial	Miss Thriftway	Bill Muncey
1958	Silver Cup	Maverick	Bill Stead
1959	Detroit Memorial	Miss Supertest III	Bob Hayward
1959	Silver Cup	Maverick	Bill Stead
1960	Detroit Memorial	Miss Thriftway	Bill Muncey
1960	Silver Cup	Nitrogen Too	Ron Musson
1961	Detroit Memorial	Gale V	Bill Cantrell
1961	Silver Cup	Miss Bardahl	Ron Musson
1962	Spirit of Detroit Trophy	Miss Century 21	Bill Muncey
1963	APBA Gold Cup	Miss Bardahl	Ron Musson
1964	APBA Gold Cup	Miss Bardahl	Ron Musson
1964	Spirit of Detroit Trophy	Such Crust IV	Walt Kade
1965	Spirit of Detroit Trophy	Tahoe Miss	Chuck Thompson
1966	APBA Gold Cup	Tahoe Miss	Mira Slovak
1966	Horace Dodge Memorial	Miss Lapeer	Warner Gardner
1967	U.I.M. World's Championship	Miss Chrysler Crew	Bill Sterett
1968	APBA Gold Cup	Miss Bardahl	Billy Schumacher
1969	U.I.M. World's Championship	Miss U. S.	Bill Muncey
1970	Horace Dodge Memorial	MYR Sheet Metal	Bill Muncey
1971	Horace Dodge Memorial	Miss Budweiser	Dean Chenoweth
1972	APBA Gold Cup	Atlas Van Lines	Bill Muncey
1973	Gar Wood Memorial	Miss Budweiser	Dean Chenoweth
1973	National Champions Regatta	Miss Budweiser	Dean Chenoweth
1974	Gar Wood Memorial	Miss Budweiser	Howie Benns
1975	Gar Wood Trophy	Miss U. S.	Tom D’Eath
1976	APBA Gold Cup	Miss U. S.	Tom D’Eath
1977	Gar Wood Memorial	Atlas Van Lines	Bill Muncey
1978	Spirit of Detroit Trophy	Atlas Van Lines	Bill Muncey
1979	Spirit of Detroit Regatta	Atlas Van Lines	Bill Muncey
1980	Spirit of Detroit Regatta	Miss Budweiser	Dean Chenoweth
1981	Stroh's Silver Cup	Miss Budweiser	Dean Chenoweth
1982	APBA Gold Cup	Atlas Van Lines	Chip Hanauer
1983	Stroh's Thunderfest	Atlas Van Lines	Chip Hanauer
1984	Stroh's Thunderfest	Miss Budweiser	Jim Kropfeld
1985	Stroh's Thunderfest	Miller American	Chip Hanauer
1986	APBA Gold Cup	Miller American	Chip Hanauer
1987	Budweiser Thunderboat Championship	Mr. Pringles	Scott Pierce
1988	Spirit of Detroit Regatta	Miller High Life	Chip Hanauer
1989	Budweiser Spirit of Detroit Race	Miss Circus Circus	Chip Hanauer
1990	APBA Gold Cup	Miss Budweiser	Tom D’Eath
1991	APBA Gold Cup	Winston Eagle	Mark Tate
1992	Budweiser APBA Gold Cup	Miss Budweiser	Chip Hanauer
1993	Budweiser APBA Gold Cup	Miss Budweiser	Chip Hanauer
1994	APBA Gold Cup	Smokin’ Joe's	Mark Tate
1995	APBA Gold Cup	Miss Budweiser	Chip Hanauer
1996	APBA Gold Cup	PICO American Dream	Dave Villwock
1997	Chrysler Jeep APBA Gold Cup	Miss Budweiser	Dave Villwock
1998	Chrysler Jeep APBA Gold Cup	Miss Budweiser	Dave Villwock
1999	Chrysler Jeep APBA Gold Cup	Miss PICO	Chip Hanauer
2000	Chrysler Jeep APBA Gold Cup	Miss Budweiser	Dave Villwock
2001	Chrysler Jeep APBA Gold Cup	Tubby's Grilled Submarines	Mike Hanson
2002	APBA Gold Cup	Miss Budweiser	Dave Villwock
2003	Chrysler Jeep APBA Gold Cup	Miss Foxhills Chrysler-Jeep	Mitch Evans
2004	Chrysler Jeep APBA Gold Cup	Miss D.Y.C.	Nate Brown
2005	Chrysler Jeep APBA Gold Cup	Miss Al Deeby Dodge	Terry Troxell
2006	Chrysler Jeep APBA Gold Cup	Miss Beacon Plumbing	Jean Theoret
2007	Chrysler Jeep APBA Gold Cup	Ellstrom E-Lam Plus	Dave Villwock
2009	Chrysler Jeep APBA Gold Cup	Ellstrom E-Lam Plus	Dave Villwock
2010	Jarvis Restoration APBA Gold Cup	Spirit of Qatar	Dave Villwock
2011	APBA Gold Cup	Spirit of Qatar	Dave Villwock
2012	DYC presents APBA Gold Cup	Spirit of Qatar	Dave Villwock
2013	APBA Gold Cup	Spirit of Qatar	Kip Brown
2014	APBA Gold Cup	Oberto	Jimmy Shane
2015	Spirit of Detroit Hydrofest	Oberto	Jimmy Shane
2016	UAW/GM Hydrofest APBA Gold Cup	Graham Trucking	J. Michael Kelly
2017	President's Cup	Delta RealTrac	Andrew Tate
2017	APBA Gold Cup	Miss HomeStreet	Jimmy Shane
2018	APBA Gold Cup	Delta RealTrac	Andrew Tate
2019–2026	No H1 Unlimited event		

Detroit joined the Unlimited hydroplane circuit in 1946.
