= San Diego Bayfair Cup =

Hydroplane boat race

Event information
- Type: H1 Unlimited hydroplane boat race
- Race area: Mission Bay, San Diego, California
- Distance: 2.5 mi (4 km)
- First race: 1964
- Former names: San Diego Cup (1964-1968, 1974); APBA Gold Cup (1969-1970, 1987, 1989, 2024); Weisfield's Trophy (1975); Jack-In-The-Box Regatta (1976-1979); Circus Circus Thunderboat Regatta (1980-1981); Circus Circus Regatta (1982); Miller High Life Regatta (1983, 1988); Miller High Life Thunderboat Regatta (1984-1985); Miller Thunderboat Regatta (1986); Thunderboat Regatta (1990, 2005, 2007-2008); Budweiser Cup (1991-1992); Star Mart Cup (1993); Bayfair Cup (1994-1995, 2012-present); Bayfair Bill Muncey Cup (1996-2002); WAMU Thunderboat Regatta (2003); WAMU Bill Muncey Cup (2004); Proboat Models World Championship (2006); Air National Guard Championship (2010-2011)
- Website: San Diego Bayfair Cup

The San Diego Bayfair Cup is an annual H1 Unlimited hydroplane boat race held on Mission Bay in San Diego, California. Founded in 1964, the race is the main attraction of the annual San Diego Bayfair. The race was run as part of the APBA Gold Cup in 1969, 1970, 1987, and 1989.

== List of San Diego Unlimited Hydroplane Champions ==
Past San Diego Unlimited Hydroplane Champions
Year	Event	Boat	Driver
1964	San Diego Cup	Mariner Too	Warner Gardner
1965	San Diego Cup	Miss Bardahl	Ron Musson
1966	San Diego Cup	Miss Budweiser	Bill Brow
1967	San Diego Cup	Miss Bardahl	Billy Schumacher
1968	San Diego Cup	My Gypsy	Tommy Fults
1969	APBA Gold Cup	Miss Budweiser	Bill Sterett
1970	APBA Gold Cup	Miss Budweiser	Dean Chenoweth
1974	San Diego Cup	Pay ‘n Pak	George Henley
1975	Weisfield’s Trophy	Pay ‘n Pak	George Henley
1976	Jack-In-The-Box Regatta	Olympia Beer	Billy Schumacher
1977	Jack-In-The-Box Regatta	Miss Budweiser	Mickey Remund
1978	Jack-In-The-Box Regatta	Atlas Van Lines	Bill Muncey
1979	Jack-In-The-Box Regatta	Miss Circus Circus	Steve Reynolds
1980	Circus Circus Thunderboat Regatta	Atlas Van Lines	Bill Muncey
1981	Circus Circus Thunderboat Regatta	Miss Budweiser	Dean Chenoweth
1982	Circus Circus Regatta	Atlas Van Lines	Chip Hanauer
1983	Miller High Life Regatta	Atlas Van Lines	Chip Hanauer
1984	Miller High Life Thunderboat Regatta	Miss Budweiser	Jim Kropfeld
1985	Miller High Life Thunderboat Regatta	Miss Budweiser	Jim Kropfeld
1986	Miller Thunderboat Regatta	Miss Bahia	Ron Armstrong
1987	APBA Gold Cup	Miller American	Chip Hanauer
1988	Miller High Life Regatta	Oh Boy! Oberto	George Woods, Jr.
1989	APBA Gold Cup	Miss Budweiser	Tom D’Eath
1990	Thunderboat Regatta	Miss Circus Circus	Chip Hanauer
1991	Budweiser Cup	Miss Budweiser	Scott Pierce
1992	Budweiser Cup	Coors Dry	Dave Villwock
1993	Star Mart Cup	Kellogg’s Frosted Flakes	Mike Hanson
1994	Bayfair	PICO American Dream	Dave Villwock
1995: Bayfair	Smokin’ Joe’s	Mark Tate	
1996	Bayfair Bill Muncey Cup	Miss Budweiser	Mark Evans
1997	Bayfair Bill Muncey Cup	PICO American Dream	Mark Evans
1998	Bayfair Bill Muncey Cup	Miss Budweiser	Dave Villwock
1999	Bayfair Bill Muncey Cup	Miss Budweiser	Dave Villwock
2000	Bayfair Bill Muncey Cup	Miss Budweiser	Dave Villwock
2001	Bayfair Bill Muncey Cup	Miss E-Lam Plus	Nate Brown
2002	Bill Muncey Cup	Miss Sun Harbor Mortgage	Mike Hanson
2003	Washington Mutual Thunderboat Regatta	Llumar Window Film	Mitch Evans
2004	Washington Mutual Bill Muncey Cup	Miss Budweiser	Dave Villwock
2005	Thunderboat Regatta	Ellstrom E-Lam Plus	Dave Villwock
2006	Proboat Models U.I.M. World’s Championship	Miss Beacon Plumbing	Jean Theoret
2007	Thunderboat Regatta	Oh Boy! Oberto	Steve David
2008	Thunderboat Regatta	Formulaboats.com	Jeff Bernard
2010	Air National Guard Championship	Spirit of Qatar	Dave Villwock
2011	Air National Guard Championship	Spirit of Qatar	Dave Villwock
2012	San Diego Bayfair	Oh Boy! Oberto	Steve David
2013	Bayfair	Graham Trucking	Jimmy Shane
2014	Bayfair	Graham Trucking	J. Michael Kelly
2015	San Diego Bayfair	Oberto	Jimmy Shane
2016	HomeStreet Bank Bayfair	Miss HomeStreet	Jimmy Shane
2017	HomeStreet Bank Bayfair	Delta Realtrac	Andrew Tate
2018	HomeStreet Bank Bayfair	Delta Realtrac	Andrew Tate
2019	HomeStreet Bank Bayfair	Graham Trucking	J. Michael Kelly.
2021	HomeStreet Bank Bayfair	Miss Tri-Cities (U-8)	J. Michael Kelly
2022	HomeStreet Bank Bayfair	Miss HomeStreet Bank	Jimmy Shane

No races in 2020, 2022, or 2023
