= USS Bingham =

1944 US Haskell-class attack transport

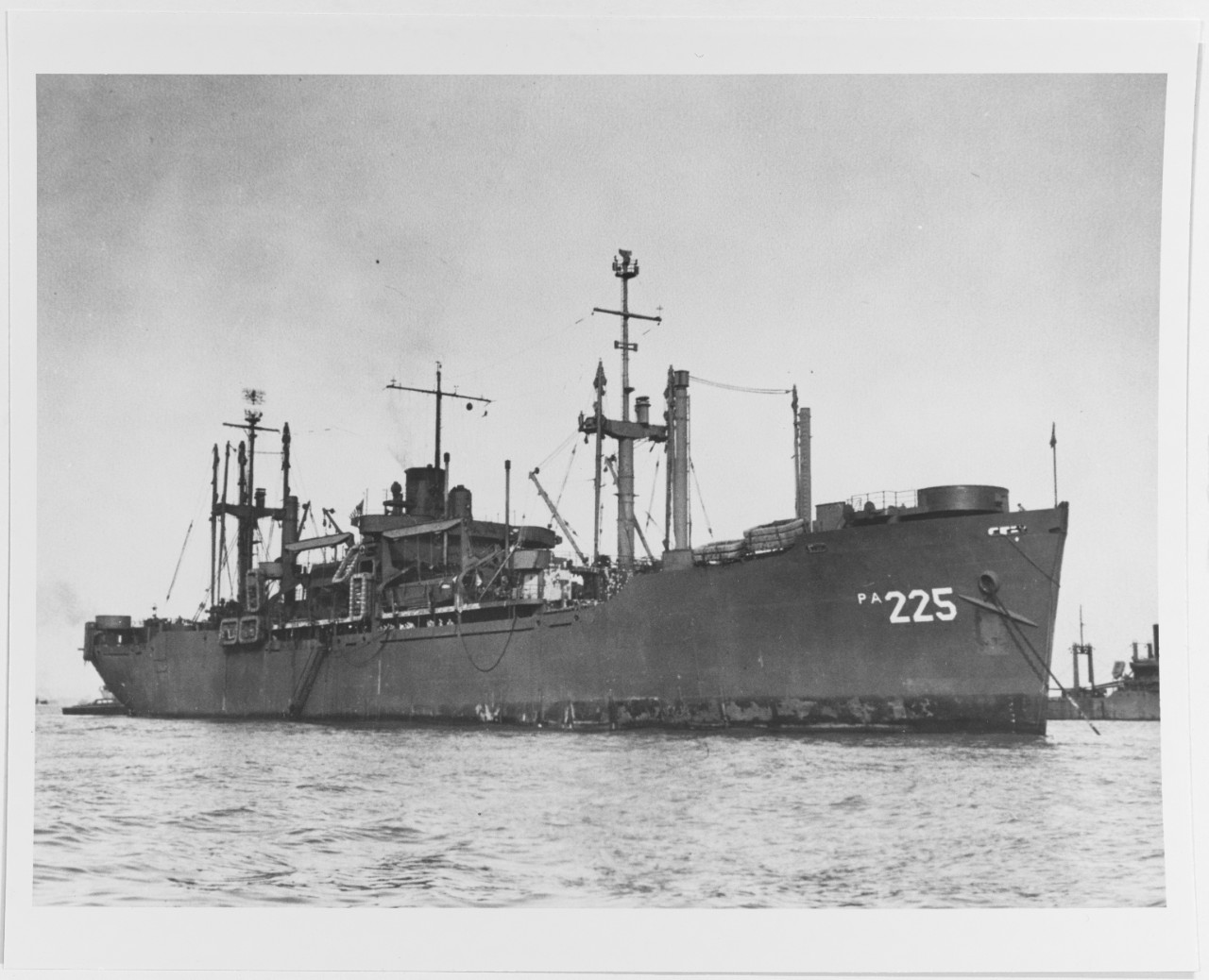
- USS Bingham (APA-225), 1945–1946 photograph.

History

United States
- Name: Bingham
- Namesake: Bingham County, Idaho
- Ordered: as a Type VC2-S-AP5 hull, MCE hull 573
- Builder: Permanente Metals Corporation, Richmond, California
- Yard number: 573
- Laid down: 22 September 1944
- Launched: 20 November 1944
- Sponsored by: Mrs John V. Harrell
- Commissioned: 23 December 1944
- Decommissioned: 17 June 1946
- Reclassified: redesignated Amphibious Transport (LPA-225), 1 January 1969
- Stricken: 3 July 1946
- Identification: Hull symbol: APA-225; Hull symbol: LPA-225; Code letters: NPRM
- Honors and awards: 1 × battle star for World War II service
- Fate: Sold for scrapping, 17 September 1983

General characteristics
- Class & type: Haskell-class attack transport
- Type: Type VC2-S-AP5
- Displacement: 6,873 long tons (6,983 t) (light load); 14,837 long tons (15,075 t) (full load)
- Length: 455 ft (139 m)
- Beam: 62 ft (19 m)
- Draft: 24 ft (7.3 m)
- Installed power: 2 × Combustion Engineering header-type boilers, 465 psi (3,210 kPa) 750 °F (399 °C); 8,500 shp (6,338 kW)
- Propulsion: 1 × Joshua Hendy geared turbine; 1 x propeller
- Speed: 17.7 kn (32.8 km/h; 20.4 mph)
- Boats & landing craft carried: 2 × LCMs; 1 × open LCPL; 18 × LCVPs; 2 × LCPRs; 1 × closed LCPL (Captain's Gig)
- Capacity: 2,900 long tons (2,900 t) DWT; 150,000 cu ft (4,200 m^{3}) (non-refrigerated)
- Troops: 86 officers, 1,475 enlisted
- Complement: 56 officers, 480 enlisted
- Armament: 1 × 5 in (127 mm)/38 caliber dual purpose gun; 1 × quad 40 mm (1.6 in) Bofors anti-aircraft (AA) gun mounts; 4 × twin 40mm Bofors (AA) gun mounts; 10 × single 20 mm (0.8 in) Oerlikon cannons AA mounts

Service record
- Part of: TransRon 24
- Operations: Assault and occupation of Okinawa Gunto (24–30 June 1945)
- Awards: American Campaign Medal; Asiatic–Pacific Campaign Medal; World War II Victory Medal; Navy Occupation Service Medal

USS Bingham (APA-225) was a Haskell-class attack transport that saw service with the US Navy in World War II. She was of the VC2-S-AP5 Victory ship design type and named after Bingham County, Idaho.

== Construction ==
Pickaway was laid down 22 September 1944, under Maritime Commission (MARCOM) contract, MCV hull 573, by Permanente Metals Corporation, Yard No. 2, Richmond, California; launched on 20 November 1944; sponsored by Mrs. John V. Harrell; commissioned builder's yard on 23 December 1944.

== Service history ==
Following shakedown training off the coast of southern California, during which her crew "received intensive drilling in amphibious boat operations" off Oceanside and Coronado, the attack transport underwent availability at the Standard Shipbuilding Corporation's dock, San Pedro, from 5 to 13 February 1945.

=== Transport duties ===
She loaded supplies at Los Angeles and then proceeded to San Francisco, before heading thence to Port Chicago, to load ammunition for Hawaii. She arrived there late on 22 February; commenced loading the next morning; and, after taking on 2,900 short tons (2,600 t) of assorted ammunition as cargo, got underway for Hawaii on the afternoon of 28 February.

Steaming independently in worsening weather, Bingham encountered "very rough seas" which caused the ship to roll as much as 40 degrees to a side, "recovering very slowly." By late afternoon, the storm had wrenched eight life rafts loose from their moorings. Throughout the night of 1 March, Bingham constantly deviated from her "routed track in an effort to lessen the effects of the sea." The squally, rainy weather continued the next day, but Bingham had passed the worst of it. She made landfall off Oahu on the morning of 6 March, and PC-483 escorted her into Pearl Harbor where she moored at the Naval Ammunition Depot.

Her voyage over and cargo delivered, Bingham was at Pearl Harbor, taking on stores and fuel while sending ashore officers and men to attend various training courses and schools.

On the morning of 27 March, her tropical idyll came to an end, and she shifted to Honolulu Harbor. After embarking US Army troops on 28 March, the ship sailed for the Marshalls on 29 March, in convoy PD 355T and reached Eniwetok on the afternoon of 6 April.

The following day, in company with Lanier and Steele, Bingham pushed on toward the Marianas. She and her consorts reached Saipan on the morning of 10 April. Two days later, having disembarked her troops there, Bingham got underway for Hawaii and reached Pearl Harbor on 21 April.

During the first half of May, Bingham took part in amphibious warfare training off Maui. Returning from these evolutions to Pearl Harbor on 14 April, she took on board the Navy's 74th Construction Battalion ("Seabees") between 15 and 20 May, and sailed for the Marshall Islands on 20 May.

After steaming in convoy with Colbert, Lander, and SS Robin Wentley with LeHardy and Enright as escort, Bingham dropped out of the convoy on the morning of 22 May, because of a bad gasket leak in a high pressure steam line. While Enright stood by, Bingham made emergency repairs. By 11:15, Bingham could get underway to overtake the convoy, and she and Enright had resumed their stations in the convoy by 19:27. Arriving at Eniwetok on the afternoon of 28 May, Bingham refueled from Meredosia and got underway for Ulithi on 5 June. From there, she set sail for the Ryukyus with Task Unit (TU) 94.18.2 on 20 June.

At 05:42 on 24 June, Bingham was detached from the task unit and directed to proceed to the eastern coast of Okinawa with SS White Swallow and Clermont. The three ships entered Nakagusuku Wan shortly after 08:00 and anchored about 3,000 yd (2,700 m) off the town of Yonabaru, a place nearly destroyed by the recent fighting. Early that afternoon, Bingham began landing her "Seabees" and Army passengers. She went to general quarters at 21:52, securing at 22:33 when no enemy planes came near her. The next few days brought more of the same. Bingham continued disembarking passengers and discharging her varied cargo into tank landing craft (LCT) and her own LCM's. To quote her war diary, "Unloading continued day and night except for interruptions for enemy air alerts on the nights of the 25, 27, and 29 June."

Unloading completed by late on 28 June, Bingham put to sea on 30 June, in company with SS San Bruno and Kinzer. After stopping briefly at Hagushi anchorage, she moved to Kerama Retto on 1 July, and joined Ulithi-bound convoy OKU 10 which reached Ulithi on 5 July. Then, with 119 passengers, 21 of whom were hospital patients, Bingham sailed for the west coast on 6 July. Steaming independently, the attack transport entered San Francisco Bay on 21 July, moored at 16:00, and started disembarking her passengers. Next came an overhaul conducted by the Matson Navigation Company which lasted until early in August. Bingham then loaded supplies and cargo and stood out to sea on 9 August, bound for Hawaii.

On 14 August, while the ship steamed westward, she received "conflicting radio reports that Japan had surrendered," or had not. "Finally, about 17:00," her war diary records, "we received the announcement, confirmed by President Truman, that Japan had agreed to lay down her arms...." Bingham reached Pearl Harbor the following day but soon got underway for Eniwetok. Arriving there on 25 August, she fueled again from Meredosia and then pushed on for the Western Carolines on 27 August. She steamed in company with nine other attack transports, a destroyer escort, and two subchasers, and the convoy reached Ulithi on the last day of August.

On 8 September, Bingham sailed for her second visit to Okinawa, as the command ship of a 23 ship convoy (UOK 57). Bingham reached Buckner Bay on 11 September, and moved in closer to the beach on 12 September, nearer to Awase, where her cargo was to be landed. During the morning of 13 September, she began disembarking her passengers and unloading her cargo. About 06:00 on 16 September, however, the wind and seas began to rise "appreciably." Long swells rolled into Buckner Bay from the southeast, as a typhoon, thought to be slowly recurving northward, headed for Okinawa. Bingham put to sea "in accordance with the current typhoon plan." By the time she cleared Buckner Bay, her bow sliced into 20-foot waves, and the sea continued to rise as she doubled Okinawa's southern tip and labored on to westward.

By the next morning she deemed it safe to return to port, so she came about and headed for Buckner Bay, anchoring at 19:00. After completing her cargo unloading on 18 September, Bingham shifted to the western side of the island and anchored off Machinato on 19 September. The next day, she took on board approximately 2,000 former Allied prisoners of war "recently liberated from camps in Japan" for passage to Manila. Bingham got underway at 07:00 on 21 September; but, when SS Cape Diamond missed a planned rendezvous off Naha, the attack transport returned to Naha for the night. Bingham finally sailed for Manila at 17:00 on 22 September, in company with Haskell, the lead ship of her class, and Lough. She moored in Manila harbor on 25 September; and, by 19:00, the former prisoners of war all had disembarked, well on their way in returning home.

=== Operation Magic Carpet ===
Bingham, however, had work yet to do. Shortly before midnight on 25 September, she began embarking some of the first 2,000 men she carried homeward in Operation "Magic Carpet". Having embarked her passengers, Bingham sailed for Hawaii the following morning, arrived at Pearl Harbor on 10 October, but got underway again the following day for the west coast. Bingham reached San Francisco on 17 October, and disembarked her passengers. The next day she shifted to the Bethlehem Steel's San Francisco yard for dry docking and alterations. Among the latter was the conversion of her number five hold to a 312-man troop compartment. A labor dispute, however, slowed the work and prompted her move from Pier 7 to Pier 922, where Bellerophon tied up alongside on 30 October, and completed the alterations.

Converted for "Magic Carpet" duty, Bingham embarked westbound passengers and sailed for the Philippines on 6 November. Reaching Samar on 19 November, she disembarked her passengers there, taking on board others bound for Manila. She then fueled from Whippet and put to sea again on 21 November. She reached Manila on the morning of 23 November.

Bingham then departed Manila on 29 November, with a "capacity load" of 2,010 passengers, eclectically composed of female Red Cross personnel, merchant marine officers, Army officers and enlisted men. Proceeding alone, she reached San Francisco on 16 December. Her passengers disembarked by 10:00, she moved to Hunters Point, where she remained for the rest of December 1945, undergoing further alterations and repairs. During this period, all of her ammunition supply and all but two 20-millimenter guns were removed.

Bingham made one final round trip voyage to the Philippines and back as part of the "Magic Carpet" before sailing for the east coast of the United States on 28 March 1946.

== Decommissioning ==
The attack transport reached Norfolk, Virginia, on 3 May, and was decommissioned there on 17 June 1946. Bingham was returned to the War Shipping Administration (WSA) the next day and laid up in the National Defense Reserve Fleet, James River Group, Lee Hall, Virginia. She was struck from the Naval Vessel Register on 3 July 1946.

She was briefly removed from the fleet 11 May 1955, by A.L. Burbank Company, Ltd., until 20 June 1955, under a Repair Program.

On 1 January 1969, she was redesignated LPA-225. In May 1975, her title was transferred from the Navy to the Maritime Administration (MARAD).

== Fate ==
On 17 September 1983, she was sold to Aguilar Y. Peris, S.A., Spain, to be scrapped. She was withdrawn for the fleet 14 October 1983.

== Awards ==
Bingham received one battle star for her World War II service.

== Notes ==
Citations

== Bibliography ==
Online resources

- Cressman, Rober J. (29 June 2016). "Pickaway". Dictionary of American Naval Fighting Ships. Naval History and Heritage Command. This article incorporates text from this source, which is in the public domain.
- "Kaiser Permanente No. 2, Richmond CA". www.ShipbuildingHistory.com. 13 October 2010.
- "USS Bingham (LPA-225)". NavSource. 2 May 2014.
- "Bingham (APA-225)". United States Department of Transportation. Archived from the original on 25 March 2016.
