= USS Pitt =

1944 Haskell-class attack transport

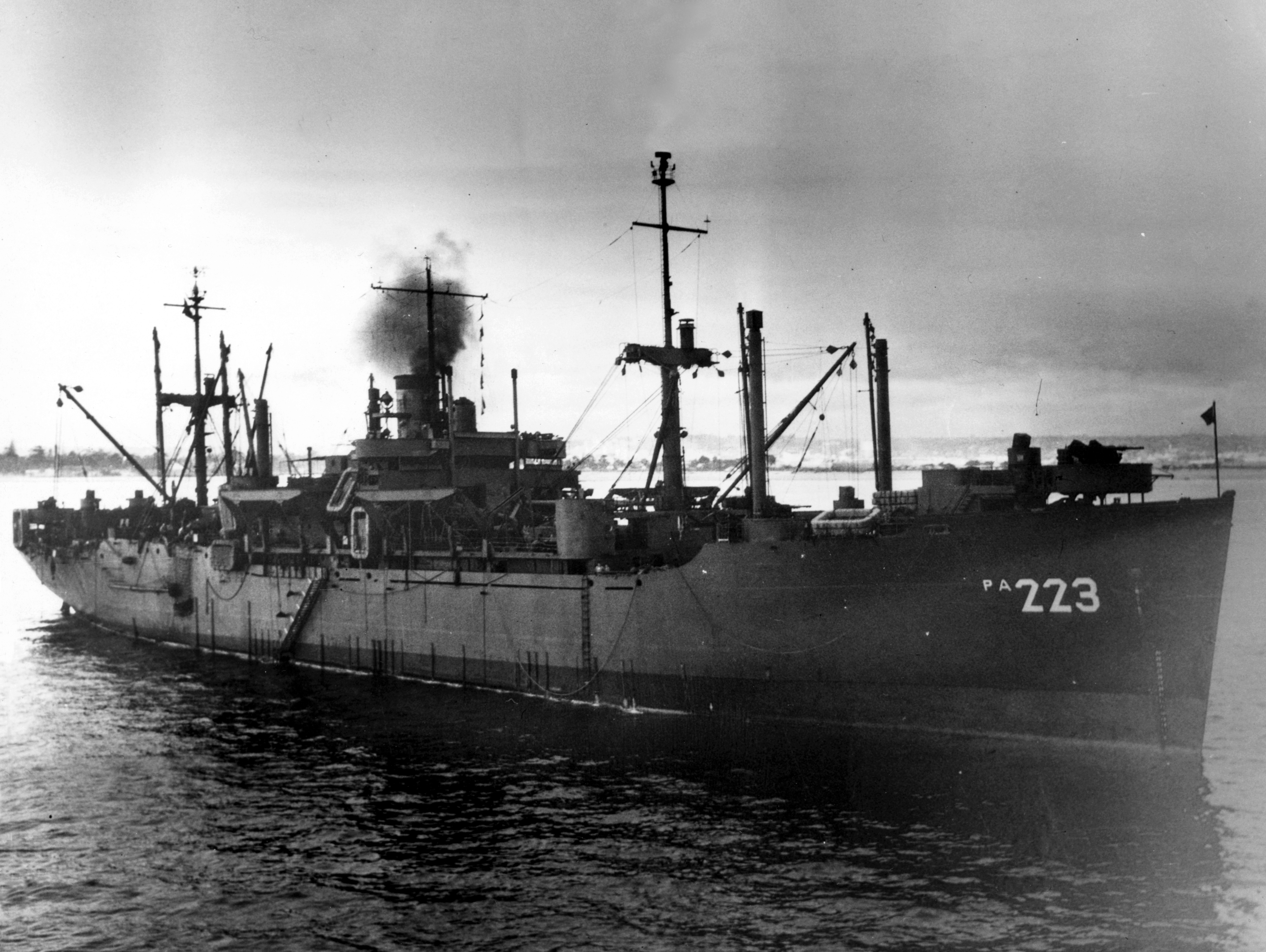

History

United States
- Name: Pitt
- Namesake: Pitt County, North Carolina
- Ordered: as a Type VC2-S-AP5 hull, MCE hull 571
- Builder: Permanente Metals Corporation, Richmond, California
- Yard number: 571
- Laid down: 8 September 1944
- Launched: 10 November 1944
- Sponsored by: Mrs. Gwin Fallis
- Commissioned: 11 December 1944
- Decommissioned: 9 April 1947
- Reclassified: redesignated Amphibious Transport (LPA-223), 14 August 1968
- Stricken: 23 April 1947
- Identification: Hull symbol: APA-223; Code letters: NPRH
- Honors and awards: 1 × battle star for World War II service
- Fate: transferred to Maritime Commission (MARCOM), 9 April 1947, laid up in the National Defense Reserve Fleet, Suisun Bay Group, Benicia, California; trade-out, 15 February 1980, withdrawn, 14 April 1980

General characteristics
- Class & type: Haskell-class attack transport
- Type: Type VC2-S-AP5
- Displacement: 6,873 long tons (6,983 t) (light load); 14,837 long tons (15,075 t) (full load)
- Length: 455 ft (139 m)
- Beam: 62 ft (19 m)
- Draft: 24 ft (7.3 m)
- Installed power: 2 × Combustion Engineering header-type boilers, 465 psi (3,210 kPa) 750 °F (399 °C); 8,500 shp (6,338 kW)
- Propulsion: 1 × Westinghouse geared turbine; 1 x propeller
- Speed: 17.7 kn (32.8 km/h; 20.4 mph)
- Boats & landing craft carried: 2 × LCMs; 1 × open LCPL; 18 × LCVPs; 2 × LCPRs; 1 × closed LCPL (Captain's Gig)
- Capacity: 2,900 long tons (2,900 t) DWT; 150,000 cu ft (4,200 m^{3}) (non-refrigerated)
- Troops: 86 officers, 1,475 enlisted
- Complement: 56 officers, 480 enlisted
- Armament: 1 × 5 in (127 mm)/38 caliber dual purpose gun; 1 × quad 40 mm (1.6 in) Bofors anti-aircraft (AA) gun mounts; 4 × twin 40mm Bofors (AA) gun mounts; 10 × single 20 mm (0.8 in) Oerlikon cannons AA mounts

Service record
- Part of: TransRon 13
- Operations: Assault and occupation of Okinawa Gunto (2–12 April 1945)
- Awards: China Service Medal; American Campaign Medal; Asiatic–Pacific Campaign Medal; World War II Victory Medal; Navy Occupation Service Medal

USS Pitt (APA-223/LPA-223) was a Haskell-class attack transport in service with the United States Navy from 1944 to 1947. She was scrapped in 1980.

== History ==
Pitt was of the VC2-S-AP5 Victory ship design type and named after Pitt County, North Carolina. She was laid down on 8 September 1944, under a Maritime Commission (MARCOM) contract, MCV hull 571, by Permanente Metals Corporation, Yard No. 2, Richmond, California; launched on 10 November 1944; sponsored by Mrs. Gwin Fallis; and commissioned on 11 December 1944.

=== Pacific War ===
After shakedown off the California coast, Pitt departed 10 February 1945, via Pearl Harbor and Eniwetok, for Ulithi Atoll, Caroline Islands, to join 600 other ships preparing for the invasion of Okinawa. She unloaded half of her ammunition cargo there, and the rest at Leyte.

==== Invasion of Okinawa ====
After loading US Army troops from the damaged attack transport Samuel Chase), she steamed for Kerama Retto where her troops cleaned out Zamami Shima, a key island in the small group off the southwest coast of Okinawa.

She then became "receiving ship" for the Kerama Retto Naval Base, caring for several hundred survivors of Japanese suicide attacks, and shooting down one suicide plane on 6 April. Pitt steamed to Saipan, Tulagi, Noumea, and Guam before returning with passengers to San Francisco, California, for the celebrations of the Japanese surrender.

=== Operation Magic Carpet ===
On 19 August, Pitt sailed via Ulithi to Mindanao and Leyte, where she loaded troops to occupy Aomori, northern Honshū, Japan, on 25 September. Pitt then began a series of Operation Magic Carpet assignments, returning fighting men to the States from such Pacific Ocean locations as Saipan and Tinian, Manila, and Nagoya, Japan.

=== Decommissioning and fate ===
She decommissioned and was transferred to the Maritime Commission (MARCOM) on 9 April 1947, and was struck from the Naval Vessel Register on 23 April 1947. Placed in the National Defense Reserve Fleet, was laid up in the National Defense Reserve Fleet, Suisun Bay Group, Benicia, California. She was briefly removed from the fleet 13 September 1954, by Pope & Talbet until 22 October 1954, under a Repair Program. On 14 August 1968, the designation "attack transport", APA, was changed to "amphibious transport", LPA, and APA-223 became LPA-223. On 15 February 1980, A. L. Burbank & Co., received Pitt along with Magoffin, Sevier, and Pickaway to trade with Moore McCormack Lines, Inc., for SS Mormaccape and SS Mormactrade. She was then sold to Carol Shipping & Trading Corporation, Liberia, who sold her to Kang Hiva Enterprise, Kaohsiung, Taiwan, to be scrapped. She was withdrawn from the fleet 14 April 1980.

== Honors and awards ==
Pitt received one battle star for World War II service.

== Notes ==
Citations

== Bibliography ==
Online resources

- "Pitt". Dictionary of American Naval Fighting Ships. Naval History and Heritage Command. 21 August 2015. This article incorporates text from this source, which is in the public domain.
- "Kaiser Permanente No. 2, Richmond CA". Shipbuilding History. 13 October 2010.
- "USS Pitt (LPA-223)". NavSource. 2 May 2014.
- "Pitt (APA-223)". United States Department of Transportation. Archived from the original on 30 March 2016.
