= USS Pickaway =

Haskell-class attack transport

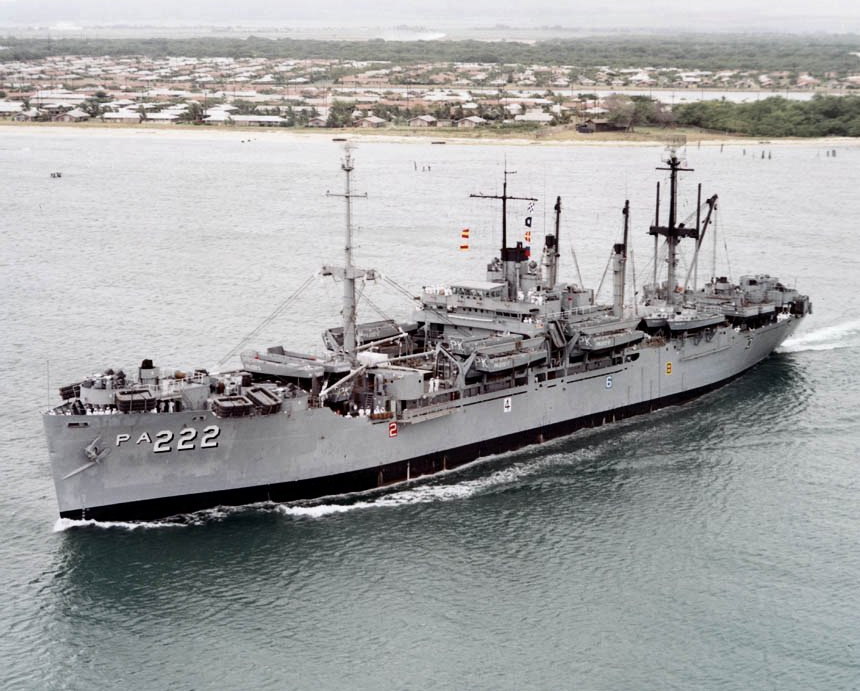
- USS Pickaway (APA-222), under way in the Pearl Harbor channel, 28 April 1964.

History

United States
- Name: Pickaway
- Namesake: Pickaway County, Ohio
- Ordered: as a Type VC2-S-AP5 hull, MCE hull 570
- Builder: Permanente Metals Corporation, Richmond, California
- Yard number: 570
- Laid down: 1 September 1944
- Launched: 5 November 1944
- Sponsored by: Mrs. William D. Schoning
- Commissioned: 12 December 1944
- Decommissioned: 30 January 1970
- Reclassified: redesignated Amphibious Transport (LPA-222), 1 January 1969
- Stricken: 1 December 1976
- Identification: Hull symbol: APA-222; Hull symbol: LPA-222; Code letters: NPRE
- Honors and awards: 1 × battle star for World War II service; 6 × battle star for Korean War service; 4 × campaign stars for Vietnam War service
- Fate: transferred to Maritime Administration (MARAD), 26 August 1970, laid up in the National Defense Reserve Fleet, Suisun Bay Group, Benicia, California; trade-out, 15 February 1980, withdrawn, 26 March 1980

General characteristics
- Class & type: Haskell-class attack transport
- Type: Type VC2-S-AP5
- Displacement: 6,873 long tons (6,983 t) (light load); 14,837 long tons (15,075 t) (full load)
- Length: 455 ft (139 m)
- Beam: 62 ft (19 m)
- Draft: 24 ft (7.3 m)
- Installed power: 2 × Combustion Engineering header-type boilers, 465 psi (3,210 kPa) 750 °F (399 °C); 8,500 shp (6,338 kW)
- Propulsion: 1 × Westinghouse geared turbine; 1 x propeller
- Speed: 17.7 kn (32.8 km/h; 20.4 mph)
- Boats & landing craft carried: 2 × LCMs; 1 × open LCPL; 18 × LCVPs; 2 × LCPRs; 1 × closed LCPL (Captain's Gig)
- Capacity: 2,900 long tons (2,900 t) DWT; 150,000 cu ft (4,200 m^{3}) (non-refrigerated)
- Troops: 86 officers, 1,475 enlisted
- Complement: 56 officers, 480 enlisted
- Armament: 1 × 5 in (127 mm)/38 caliber dual purpose gun; 1 × quad 40 mm (1.6 in) Bofors anti-aircraft (AA) gun mounts; 4 × twin 40mm Bofors (AA) gun mounts; 10 × single 20 mm (0.8 in) Oerlikon cannons AA mounts

Service record
- Part of: TransRon 23
- Operations: World War II; Assault and occupation of Iwo Jima (6–16 March 1945); Korean War Era; North Korean Aggression (2–3 August, 7–12, 18–25 September, 7–29 October 1950); Inchon Landing (13–17 September 1950); UN Summer–Fall Offensive (2–3 August, 26–29 October, 11 November 1951); Second Korean Winter (5–6, 17–18, 23–30 December 1951, 3–4 February 1952); Third Korean Winter (15 December 1952, 13–15 February, 13–20 March 1953); Korea, Summer–Fall 1953 (1–11 June 1953); Vietnam War; Vietnam Advisory Campaign (12–27 January 1963, 9 August–7 November 1964); Vietnam Defense (4–7 July 1965); Vietnam Counteroffensive (24 March–7 April, 21 April–8 May 10–30 June 1966); Vietnam Counteroffensive–Phase II (1–3 July, 14–30 July 1966); Vietnam Counteroffensive–Phase III (28–30 June, 19–28 September, 17–23 October 1967)
- Awards: World War II; Navy Meritorious Unit Commendation; American Campaign Medal; Asiatic–Pacific Campaign Medal; World War II Victory Medal; Korean War; National Defense Service Medal; Korean Service Medal; United Nations Korea Medal; Republic of Korea War Service Medal; Vietnam Era; Armed Forces Expeditionary Medal; Vietnam Service Medal; Republic of Vietnam Gallantry Cross Unit Citation; Republic of Vietnam Campaign Medal

USS Pickaway (APA/LPA-222) was a Haskell-class attack transport that saw service with the US Navy in World War II, the Korean War and the Vietnam War. She was of the VC2-S-AP5 Victory ship design type and named after Pickaway County, Ohio.

== Construction ==
Pickaway was laid down 1 September 1944, under Maritime Commission (MARCOM) contract, MCV hull 570, by Permanente Metals Corporation, Yard No. 2, Richmond, California; launched on 5 November 1944; sponsored by Mrs. William D. Schoning; converted into an APA; acquired by the Navy and commissioned on 12 December 1944.

== Service history ==
=== World War II ===
After shakedown and amphibious exercises at Coronado Beach, California, Pickaway embarked some 1,500 US Army troops at Seattle, Washington, departed on 9 February, arrived Pearl Harbor on 16 February, disembarked the troops and headed for Iwo Jima to evacuate Marine forces who were finishing off the remaining Japanese forces on the island. Pickaway reached Iwo Jima on 14 March, received on board the 24th Marine Regiment, sailed on 20 March, and returned to Pearl Harbor on 5 April.

Pickaway participated in amphibious exercises until sailing for Guam on 4 May, with military passengers. Arriving Guam on 17 May, she embarked soldiers, sailors, and Marines; departed Apra Harbor on 22 May; and arrived San Francisco on 7 June.

On 2 July she took on board Navy and US Coast Guard passengers and departed San Francisco for Noumea, New Caledonia. Following disembarking of personnel in Noumea on 8 July, Pickaway steamed to Espiritu Santo, the Russell Islands, and Guadalcanal to pick up passengers and sailed on 23 July, for San Francisco where she arrived on 6 August.

While preparing for another transpacific voyage, the ship learned of the end of hostilities. During the remainder of 1945, Pickaway shuttled back and forth across the Pacific embarking passengers at bases in the western Pacific and returning them to the United States.

Remaining in the Amphibious Force, Pacific Fleet, Pickaway visited both Japan and China in 1947 and participated in Operation Sandstone, the second atomic test in the Pacific, early in 1948.

=== Korean War ===
In the summer of 1950, a month after the North Korean forces marched against South Korea, Pickaway began shuttling US Army troops from Japan to Pusan to stem the tide of battle. On 15 September 1950, she saw her first real amphibious invasion at Inchon, when the United Nations (UN) forces flanked the North Koreans. During the Korean War, Pickaway was deployed to the Korean area four times. She landed troops on most of the major Korean beachheads.

In March 1955, Pickaway left Korea for the last time, carrying troops of the same brigade she transported to Korea on her first trip. During 1957 and 1958, Pickaway made regular deployments to WestPac. During Pickaway's 1958 WestPac tour, she took part in "Exercise Blue Star", which was the largest amphibious exercise conducted by Pacific Fleet forces since World War II.

=== Vietnam ===
After returning from the Far East in August 1963, Pickaway entered the Willamette Iron and Steel Works shipyard at Richmond, California, for Fleet Rehabilitation and Modernization (FRAM). In January 1964, the ship began extensive underway and amphibious training, and in March, departed San Diego for Hawaii, and large scale amphibious "Operation Westwind". On 18 June, she got underway from San Diego for a six-month cruise to the western Pacific. Soon after arriving in Yokosuka, she was ordered to proceed at once to Buckner Bay, Okinawa, to embark a Marine Battalion for transport to Vietnam to help build up American forces after the Gulf of Tonkin Incident.

In March 1965, she participated in the US Pacific Fleet Exercise "Silver Lance". On 24 May 1965, she again bolstered the Allied military effort in Vietnam. On 7 July 1965, together with other elements of Amphibious Squadron 3, Pickaway landed the 2nd Battalion of the 9th Marine Regiment over the beaches of Da Nang, South Vietnam.

During 1966 she participated in Operations "Jackstay", "Osage", "Deckhouse I", "Nathan Hale", "Deck House II", and "Hastings".

After overhaul and training out of San Diego, Pickaway departed San Diego on 31 May, for the western Pacific and after offloading cargo at Da Nang, proceeded to Manila for participation in the SEATO training exercise "Sea Dog." On 19 October Pickaway replenished Oriskany at sea in the Tonkin Gulf. Pickaway spent 1968 operating out of San Diego, California.

== Decommissioning ==
She was decommissioned 30 January 1970, with delivery to the Maritime Administration (MARAD) 26 August 1970. Pickaway was laid up in the National Defense Reserve Fleet, Suisun Bay Group, Benicia, California. She was struck from the Navy Vessel Register on 1 December 1976.

== Fate ==
On 15 February 1980, A. L. Burbank & Co., received Pickaway along with Magoffin, Sevier, and Pitt to trade with Moore McCormack Lines, Inc., for SS Mormaccape and SS Mormactrade. She was then sold to Carol Shipping & Trading Corporation, Liberia, who sold her to Kang Hua Enterprise, Kaohsiung, Taiwan, to be scrapped. She was withdrawn from the fleet 26 March 1980.

== Awards ==
Pickaway received one battle star for World War II service and six battle stars for Korean War service.

== Notes ==
Citations

== Bibliography ==
Online resources

- "Pickaway". Dictionary of American Naval Fighting Ships. Naval History and Heritage Command. 20 August 2015. This article incorporates text from this source, which is in the public domain.
- "Kaiser Permanente No. 2, Richmond CA". Shipbuilding History. 13 October 2010.
- "USS Pickaway (LPA-222)". NavSource. 7 January 2017.
- "PICKAWAY (LPA-222)". United States Department of Transportation. Archived from the original on 4 November 2016.
