= USS St. Mary's (APA-126) =

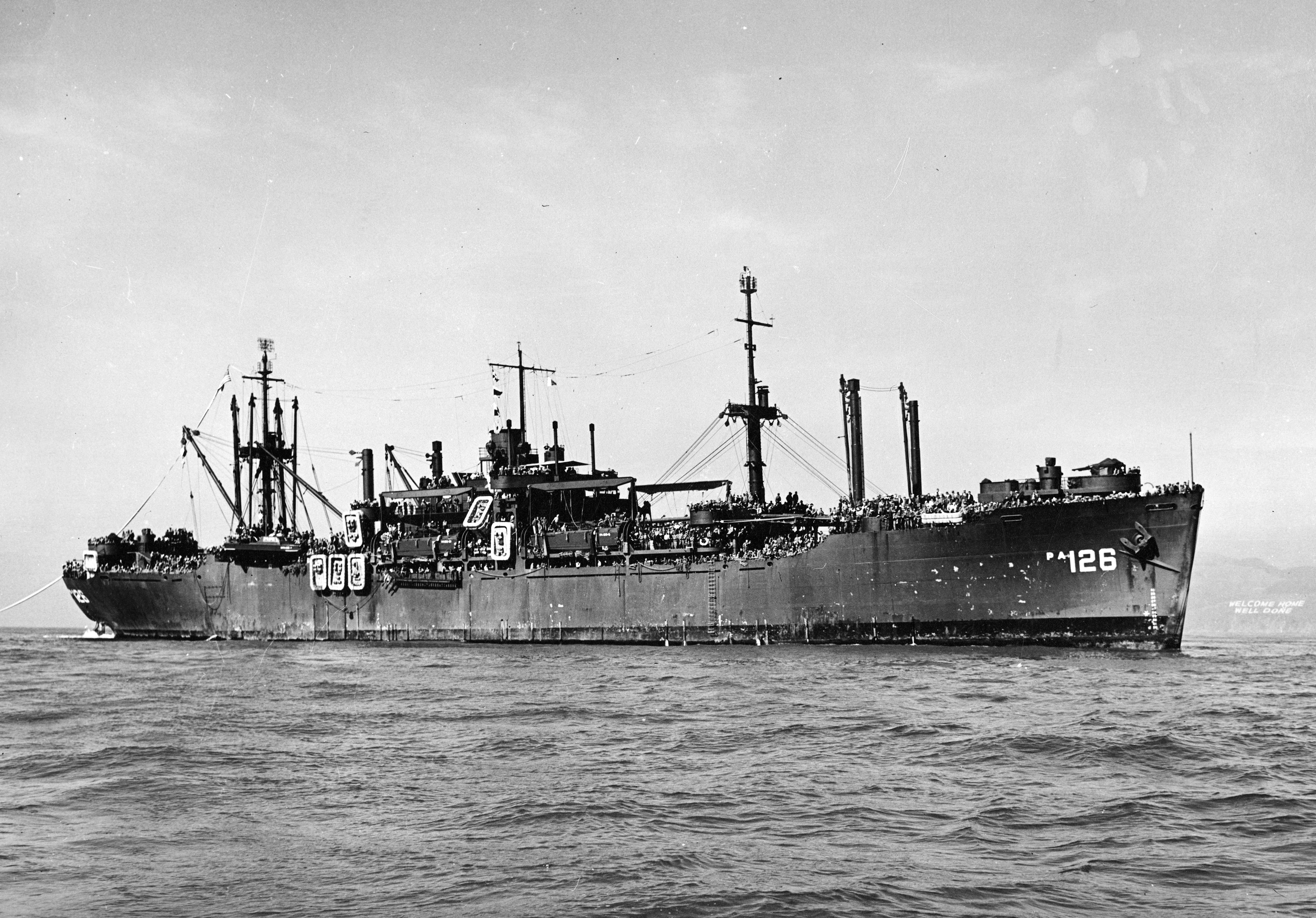

History

United States
- Name: USS St. Mary's
- Namesake: St. Mary's County, Maryland
- Builder: California Shipbuilding Corp.
- Launched: 4 September 1944
- Commissioned: 15 November 1944
- Decommissioned: 15 February 1946
- Stricken: 21 February 1946
- Honors and awards: 1 Battle star
- Fate: Sold for scrap, 18 April 1975

General characteristics
- Class & type: Haskell-class attack transport
- Displacement: 6,873 tons (lt), 14,837 t (fl)
- Length: 455 ft (139 m)
- Beam: 62 ft (19 m)
- Draft: 24 ft (7 m)
- Propulsion: 1 × geared turbine, 2 × header-type boilers, 1 × propeller, designed 8,500 shp (6,338 kW)
- Speed: 17 knots (31 km/h; 20 mph)
- Boats & landing craft carried: 2 × LCM; 12 × LCVP; 3 × LCPL
- Capacity: Troops: 86 officers, 1,475 enlisted; Cargo: 150,000 cu ft, 2,900 tons
- Complement: 56 officers, 480 enlisted
- Armament: 1 × 5"/38 dual-purpose gun; 4 × twin 40mm guns; 10 × single 20mm guns; late armament, add 1 × 40mm quad mount

USS St. Mary's (APA-126) was a Haskell-class attack transport in service with the United States Navy from 1944 to 1946. She was scrapped in 1975.

== History ==
St. Mary's was of the VC2-S-AP5 Victory ship design type and was named for St. Mary's County, Maryland. She was laid down under Maritime Commission contract (MCV hull 40) on 29 June 1944 by the California Shipbuilding Corporation, Wilmington, California; launched on 4 September 1944; sponsored by Mrs. Arthur S. Tode; acquired by the Navy on loan charter and delivered on 14 November 1944; and commissioned on 15 November 1944.

Assigned to Transport Squadron 17 (TransRon 17) following shakedown, St. Mary's departed Los Angeles on 1 January 1945; loaded bulldozers, airplane engines, bomb service trucks, and other equipment at San Diego; and, on the 4th, sailed for Manus, Admiralty Islands. Arriving in Seeadler Harbor on the 21st, she offloaded her cargo and steamed to Humboldt Bay, New Guinea, whence she carried troops to Leyte, 31 January to 6 February.

During the remainder of February and most of March, she trained with units of the 77th Division for Operation "Iceberg," the assault on Okinawa. On 21 March, she cleared Leyte Gulf with TG 51.1 and headed north. Five days later, she landed some of her troops on Kerama Retto, then stood by to take on casualties. On 13 April, she shifted to the Hagushi anchorage area; and, on the 16th, sent troops ashore on Ie Shima. On the 19th, she moved around to Okinawa's southern coast for a diversionary landing; then returned to Hagushi to discharge the remainder of her cargo and troops.

On 26 April, St. Mary's departed the kamikaze target area. Three weeks at Ulithi followed. On 24 May, she steamed for Guam; exchanged landing boats; and got underway to return to the Philippines. From 31 May to 26 June, she remained in the Subic Bay-Manila Bay areas. In July, she trained with units of the 81st Infantry Division at Leyte; and, in early August, trained with other troops off Iloilo.

In mid-August, hostilities ended. St. Mary's embarked occupation troops and sailed for Japan, arriving in Tokyo Bay on 2 September, just prior to the signing of the official surrender documents. Two days later, she disembarked troops of the 1st Cavalry Division at Yokohama, then returned to the Philippines. From Mindanao, she lifted troops to Kure, then steamed to Okinawa; whence, as a unit of the “Magic Carpet” fleet, she carried veterans back to the United States.

In December, the APA returned to Okinawa for a second group of returning servicemen. Departing Buckner Bay on the 19th, she developed engine trouble on 3 January 1946, 450 miles from her destination. Nashville, however, took her in tow, and she reached San Francisco on 6 January 1946.

Six days later, St. Mary's reported for inactivation. On 15 February, she was decommissioned and returned to the Maritime Commission. She was placed in the National Defense Reserve Fleet at Suisun Bay the same day. Her name was struck from the Navy list on 21 February.

=== Fate ===
In 1956 St. Mary's was withdrawn from the Reserve Fleet as part of a Repair Program, GAA-Pacific Far East Lines, and then returned. On 18 April 1975 she was sold to Nicolai Joffe Corp., for $219,489.78, to be scrapped. At 1235 PDT, on 3 June 1975 she was withdrawn from the Reserve Fleet and sent to the breaker's yard.

== Awards ==
St. Mary's earned one battle star for World War II service.
