= USS Rutland =

Attack transport ship in United States Navy

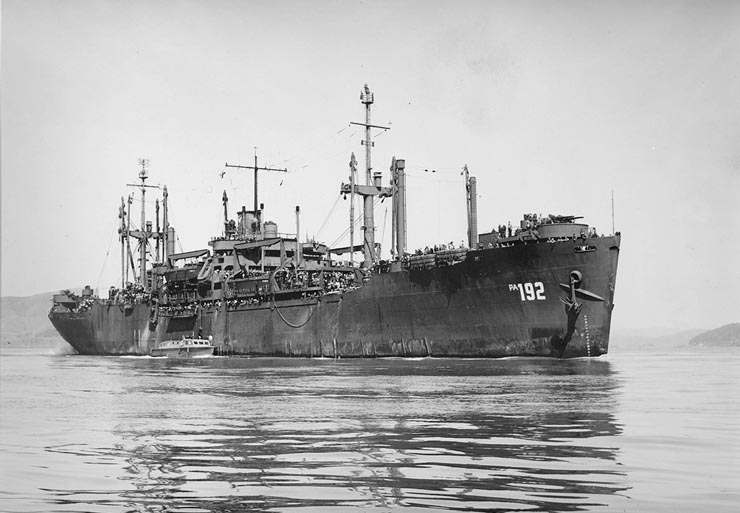
- USS Rutland (APA-192)

History

United States
- Name: USS Rutland
- Namesake: Rutland County, Vermont
- Builder: Kaiser Shipbuilding
- Laid down: 4 May 1944
- Launched: 10 August 1944
- Commissioned: 29 September 1944
- Decommissioned: 26 February 1947
- Stricken: 1 October 1958
- Honors and awards: 2 Battle stars
- Fate: Scrapped 1982

General characteristics
- Displacement: 6,873 tons
- Length: 455 ft (139 m)
- Beam: 62 ft (19 m)
- Draft: 24 ft (7.3 m)
- Propulsion: Oil Fired Steam Turbine; 1 Shaft
- Speed: 17 knots
- Boats & landing craft carried: 26
- Complement: 56 Officers, 480 Enlisted
- Armament: 1 5"/38 gun; 1 40 mm quad mount; 4 40 mm twin mounts; 10 20 mm single mounts

USS Rutland (APA-192) was a Haskell-class attack transport built and used by the US Navy in World War II. She was a Victory ship design, VC2-S-AP5. She was named after Rutland County, Vermont, USA.

== World War II service ==
Rutland was laid down on 4 May 1944 in the Kaiser Shipyards, in Vancouver, Washington. She was launched on 10 August 1944. Her sponsor was Mrs. Karl V. Kilgore. She was acquired on a loan-charter basis from the Maritime Commission. She was commissioned on 29 September 1944.

She reported to the Commander-in-Chief, Pacific, on 9 October 1944. Her shakedown took place along the West Coast of the United States. On 30 November 1944 she departed Oakland, California for Pearl Harbor. She arrived on 6 December and with other ships of Transport Division 47 loaded the 5th Marine Division at Hilo, Hawaii. In and around the islands she conducted training exercises with the crew and troops.

With the division she departed Pearl Harbor on 27 January 1945 for Eniwetok Atoll, Marshall Islands. She arrived on 5 February, and then steamed to Saipan and Tinian Islands. On 16 February, Squadron 16, of which Division 47 was a part, steamed to Iwo Jima and was part of the Battle of Iwo Jima.

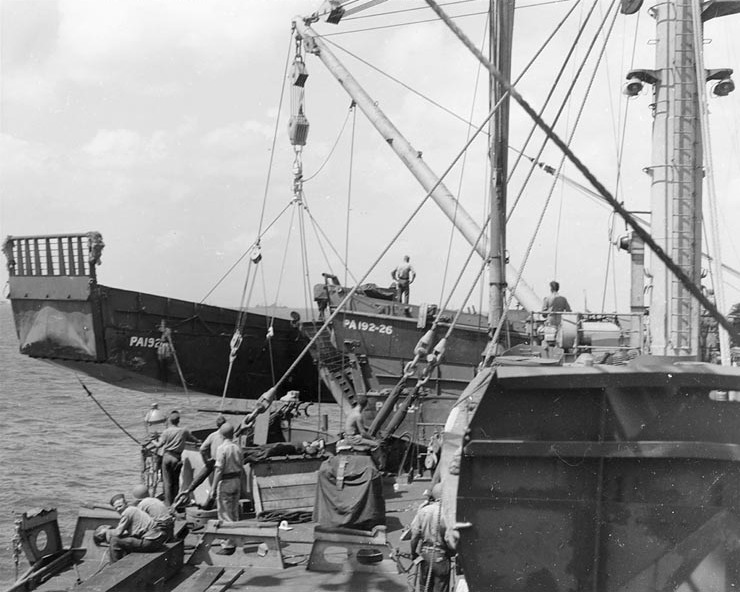
USS Rutland (APA-192) lowering an LCM off Iwo Jima, 1945

At Iwo Jima on 19 February 1945, she took part in the assault of the fortified island. She supported her landing craft that operated on Red Beaches 1 and 2. For eight days, she unloaded troops and cargo and took on the many casualties. Although 11 of the ship with her were lost, and several of her beach party troop personnel were wounded, only one was killed.

Rutland departed Iwo Jima on 27 February. She arrived at Saipan on 2 March 1945, and then steamed on to Guam. Arriving at Guam her Marine casualties debarked. She then steamed to Tulagi at the Solomon Islands, arriving on 12 March. From there she steamed to Espiritu Santo island of Vanuatu and loaded parts of the 27th Division, 10th Army. Her troop were a floating reserve in the invasion of Okinawa.

The Transport Division 47 debarked at Kerama Retto island at Okinawan. The Rutland arrived at Kerama Kaikyo, Okinawa on 9 April 1945 and departed later that day, while enemy planes attacked ships around Okinawa. The SS Logan Victory and SS Hobbs Victory sank at Okinawa in battle on 6 April 1945. The morning of 10 April, Rutland arrived in meeting area off the island of Tsugen Jima, a Japan occupied island on the eastern side of Okinawa Island. There her landing boats landed troops from Highlands. At about noon the Rutland and her convoy ships moved to Nakagusuku Wan to harbor. She then moved to the main Okinawa bay for a few days, then steamed to Tsugen Jima after it had been secured. During the battle at Tsugen Jima, Rutland and the ship's landing craft she supported were under fire from mortar, canister, and rifle fire from the island shore. All the boats survived with no serious damage or wounded.

Her ship convoy steamed to the western shores of Okinawa to Hagushi beach. The beach had been secured on 1 April. The Rutland unloaded supply to support the troops there. While the beach had been secured the Rutland and her ship convoy battled many enemy air attacks with the deck guns. Rutland helped down four attacking planes.

From Hagushi Okinawa she steamed to Saipan load more landing boats. She steamed to Ulithi and Subic Bay for an overhaul and reconditioning. She prepared for the invasion of the Japanese home islands from 26 June until 15 August 1945, with exercises at Leyte. But with the surrender of Japan on 15 August 1945, the training exercises were canceled.

Rutland was one of the first transport ship to arrive off Honshū, mainland Japan. On 2 September the Rutland steamed into Tokyo Bay. Troops of the 1st Cavalry Division at Yokohama debarked her.

Rutland steam back to the Philippines on 4 September. She arrived at Leyte on 11 September. On 16 September she loaded parts of the 41st Infantry Division, 10th Corps, U.S. Army, and troop cargo at Zamboanga, Mindanao, Philippine Islands. She steamed to Hiro Wan, Honshū, Japan and arrived on 6 October and unloaded her crew. On 14 October, as part of Operation Magic Carpet loaded about 1,900 Navy members at Okinawa, she arrived at Seattle on 1 November. She returned to Okinawa and again took about 1,900 troops home to the USA. She was then moved to the Atlantic Reserve Fleet on 29 December 1945.

== Fate ==
Rutland was removed from commission and placed in the US Reserve Fleet on 14 January 1946. On 26 February 1947 she was moved and berthed at Norfolk, Virginia. On 1 October 1958 she was removed from the Naval Vessel Register and transferred to the Maritime Commission for scrapping. On 31 March 1959 she was moved to the National Defense Reserve Fleet at James River, Virginia. On 8 June 1982 she was sold to Union Minerals & Alloys Corporation, for $25,000, to be scrapped. At 10:30 on 24 August 1982, she was withdrawn from the Reserve Fleet and sent to the breaker's yard.
