= USS Telfair =

Haskell-class U.S. Navy attack transport

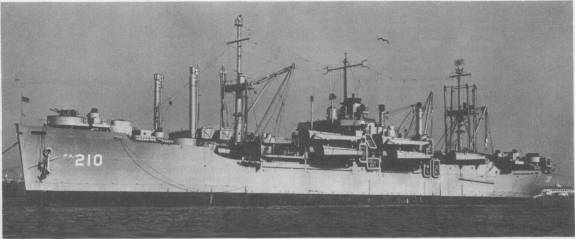
- USS Telfair (APA-210). The merchant-like appearance of attack transports and cargo ships is belied by their large complements of landing craft.

History

United States
- Name: Telfair
- Namesake: Telfair County, Georgia
- Ordered: as a Type VC2-S-AP5 hull, MCE hull 558
- Builder: Permanente Metals Corporation, Richmond, California
- Yard number: 558
- Laid down: 30 May 1944
- Launched: 30 August 1944
- Sponsored by: Mrs J. L. Cauthorn
- Commissioned: 31 October 1944
- Decommissioned: 20 July 1946
- Identification: Hull symbol: APA-210; Code letters: NPPH
- Honors and awards: 1 × battle stars for World War II service
- Fate: laid up in the Pacific Reserve Fleet, Stockton Group, 20 July 1946

United States
- Recommissioned: 12 September 1950
- Decommissioned: 29 February 1958
- Stricken: 1 July 1960
- Honors and awards: 3 × battle stars for Korean War service
- Fate: temporary assigned to Maritime Administration (MARAD), 29 February 1958, laid up in National Defense Reserve Fleet, Suisun Bay, California; permanent transfer to MARAD, 30 June 1960; transferred to US Navy, 24 August 1961

United States
- Acquired: 24 August 1961
- Recommissioned: 22 November 1961
- Decommissioned: 31 October 1968
- Reclassified: redesignated Amphibious Transport (LPA-210), 1 January 1969
- Stricken: 1 November 1968
- Identification: Hull symbol: APA-210; Hull symbol: LPA-210; Code letters: NISC
- Fate: transferred to MARAD, 26 June 1969, laid up, Portsmouth, Virginia; sold for scrapping, 26 June 1969, withdrawn, 14 July 1969

General characteristics
- Class & type: Haskell-class attack transport
- Type: Type VC2-S-AP5
- Displacement: 6,873 long tons (6,983 t) (light load); 14,837 long tons (15,075 t) (full load)
- Length: 455 ft (139 m)
- Beam: 62 ft (19 m)
- Draft: 24 ft (7.3 m)
- Installed power: 2 × Babcock & Wilcox header-type boilers, 465 psi (3,210 kPa) 750 °F (399 °C); 8,500 shp (6,338 kW)
- Propulsion: 1 × Westinghouse geared turbine; 1 x propeller
- Speed: 17.7 kn (32.8 km/h; 20.4 mph)
- Boats & landing craft carried: 2 × LCMs; 1 × open LCPL; 18 × LCVPs; 2 × LCPRs; 1 × closed LCPL (Captain's Gig)
- Capacity: 2,900 long tons (2,900 t) DWT; 150,000 cu ft (4,200 m^{3}) (non-refrigerated)
- Troops: 87 officers, 1,475 enlisted
- Complement: 55 officers, 477 enlisted
- Armament: 1 × 5 in (127 mm)/38 caliber dual purpose gun; 1 × quad 40 mm (1.6 in) Bofors anti-aircraft (AA) gun mounts; 4 × twin 40mm Bofors (AA) gun mounts; 10 × single 20 mm (0.8 in) Oerlikon cannons AA mounts

Service record
- Part of: TransRon 17 (WWII)
- Operations: World War II; Assault and occupation of Okinawa Gunto (25 March–26 April 1945); Korean War; First UN Counter Offensive (9 February–6 March 1951); Communist China Spring Offensive (29 April–1 May 1951); Third Korean Winter (2–22 January, 13–15 February, 14–19 March 1953)
- Awards: World War II; Combat Action Ribbon; American Campaign Medal; Asiatic–Pacific Campaign Medal; World War II Victory Medal; Navy Occupation Service Medal; National Defense Service Medal; China Service Medal; Korean War; Korean Service Medal; United Nations Korea Medal; Republic of Korea War Service Medal

USS Telfair (APA/LPA-210) was a Haskell-class attack transport that saw service with the US Navy in World War II and the Korean War. She remained in service through most of the 1950s and 1960s, where she participated in various peacetime operations. Telfair was named for Telfair County, Georgia, which was itself named after Edward Telfair, the second governor of the state, a member of the Continental Congress, and a signer of the Articles of Confederation.

== Construction ==
Telfair was laid down 30 May 1944, under a Maritime Commission (MARCOM) contract, MCV hull 558, by Permanente Metals Corporation, Yard No. 2, Richmond, California; launched 30 August 1944; sponsored by Mrs. J. L. Cauthorn; and commissioned at San Francisco 31 October 1944.

== Service history ==
=== World War II ===
Following fitting out at Oakland, California, and shakedown and amphibious training off San Pedro, California, the attack transport returned via San Diego to San Francisco to load troops and cargo for her first westward voyage.

On the second day of 1945, she sailed westward and reached Pearl Harbor on 8 January. Nine days later, Telfair resumed her voyage carrying elements of the 111th Infantry to the Palaus for garrison duty. She disembarked troops at Peleliu between 30 January, and 6 February, and then continued on to the Philippines, arriving at Leyte on 9 February, to prepare for the invasion of the Ryūkyūs.

==== Invasion of Okinawa ====
In mid-March, the attack transport embarked elements of the Army's 77th Division and sortied from San Pedro Bay with Task Group (TG) 51.1.

The "Western Islands Attack Group", as TG 51.1 was called, was responsible for conducting the prelude to the Okinawa invasion by securing the anchorage at Kerama Retto, a small cluster of islands just to the south and west of Okinawa. Accordingly, it was the first element engaged in combat in the vicinity of Okinawa during the actual invasion operation. Between 25 March and 2 April, Telfair participated in the assault and occupation of those key islets.

==== Attacked by kamikazes ====
On 30 March, she reembarked her troops, and, on the afternoon of 2 April, she cleared the roadstead for a waiting area to the south. That evening, just after 18:30, her task group was jumped by 10 or more kamikazes. Telfair and her sister-ship Goodhue "...were attacked by three planes in rapid succession." Her gunners and those of Goodhue combined to explode one in mid-air. A second, after ricocheting between her starboard and port kingposts, smacked into Telfair's bulwark, then careened over the side. The third, his glide deflected by gunfire, crashed into Goodhue's cargo boom, smashed her after 20-millimeter gun tubs, and joined his compatriot in the sea.

==== Repairs ====
Telfair remained in the vicinity of Okinawa supporting the invasion until 26 April, when she got underway for Ulithi Atoll in the Western Carolines. She entered the lagoon on 30 April, replenished, and repaired battle damage until 22 May. On that day, the attack transport headed east to return to the United States. She reached Seattle, Washington, on 13 June, disembarked passengers, and underwent further repairs.

On 26 June, she steamed out of Puget Sound and again pointed her bow westward. On 13 July, she delivered US Army hospital units safely to Saipan. Four days later, Telfair left the Marianas, bound for San Francisco, where she arrived on the last day of July.

==== After hostilities ====
Putting to sea once more on 12 August, the attack transport shaped a course for Ulithi, but peace had returned to the Pacific before she reached that atoll on 28 August. Over the next two months, she steamed between Luzon and Leyte in the Philippines, visiting Manila from 1 to 13 October. On 16 October, she departed Lingayen Gulf to land occupation troops in Japan. She made Hiro Wan and Kure, at Honshū, on 20 October, and subsequently landed her passengers.

==== Operation Magic Carpet ====
At the end of October, Telfair reported for Operation Magic Carpet duty. On 2 November, she arrived at Samar, in the Philippines, where she embarked her first load of veterans for the return voyage to the United States. On the 4th, the attack transport departed the Philippines and, after almost three weeks at sea, entered port at Portland, Oregon. Telfair remained on the west coast until Christmas Eve when she weighed anchor to return to the western Pacific. She stopped at Saipan at the end of the first week in January 1946; then continued on to Manila where she moored on 12 January. For the next two months, she operated in the Philippine Islands, visiting Subic Bay and Samar.

==== First decommission ====
She departed Samar on 5 March, and, after calling at Pearl Harbor, reached San Francisco on 25 March. On 8 April, she arrived at Stockton, California, to begin inactivation overhaul. On 20 July, she was inactive and berthed with the Stockton Group, Pacific Reserve Fleet.

=== Korean War ===
The North Korean attack upon the Republic of Korea in June 1950, returned Telfair to life. She was ordered activated on 7 August, and actually rejoined the US Pacific Fleet when she was recommissioned on 12 September 1950. During the period of fighting in Korea, roughly June 1950 to July 1953, Telfair deployed to the western Pacific on three separate occasions.

During the first, from October 1950 to July 1951, she visited Yokosuka, Kobe, and Sasebo in Japan and Inchon and Chinnampo in Korea, shuttling troops from the former three ports to the latter two. Her first and second Korean War deployments were separated by six months of operations along the west coast of the United States.

Her second tour began with her departure from San Francisco on 26 January 1952, and ended upon her return to the west coast at San Diego on 24 May. In the intervening period, she saw no actual Korean service, but steamed between Okinawa, Kobe, Yokosuka, and Sasebo primarily engaged in training United Nations troops in amphibious operations.

Her third and final deployment during the Korean War began on 30 October 1952 after four months on the west coast. It took her to the already-familiar Japanese ports and to Manila, Subic Bay, and Hong Kong, as well as the Korean ports of Pusan, Inchon, the island of Koje Do and to the vicinity of Sokcho Ri. Telfair returned to San Diego on 20 April 1953, and resumed operations in the eastern Pacific.

Between August 1953 and February 1958, Telfair made three more deployments to the western Pacific. For the most part, her duties during those visits to the Far East consisted of lifting United Nations troops from now-peaceful Korea; shuttling troops and supplies between American bases in Korea, Japan, Okinawa, and the Philippines, and participating in 7th Fleet amphibious exercises.

==== Operation Passage to Freedom ====
In August 1954, however, she did depart from her normal routine to participate in Operation "Passage to Freedom", in which Navy ships evacuated Vietnamese refugees from Haiphong, in the communist-controlled northern half of newly partitioned Indochina, to Saigon, in the pro-western southern portion. She returned to San Diego 21 November 1954. During non-deployment periods, Telfair conducted west coast operations and leave and upkeep periods in California ports.

==== Second decommission ====
On 29 February 1958, Telfair was decommissioned once more and laid up with the National Defense Reserve Fleet.

=== Third commission ===
A little over two years later, it appeared that her naval career was at an end once and for all. On 1 July 1960, Telfair was transferred to the Maritime Administration (MARAD), and her name was struck from the Navy List. However, the Navy reacquired her on 24 August 1961, and her name was reinstated on the Navy List on 1 September. She was placed in commission for the third time on 22 November 1961.

Telfair's new seven-year lease on life took her to new oceans and new ports of call for, immediately following training off San Diego, she headed for duty with the Amphibious Force, Atlantic Fleet. She transited the Panama Canal on 1 February 1962, and arrived in her new home port, Norfolk, Virginia, on 6 February. From then until final decommissioning in 1968, she alternated cruises to the Mediterranean as a unit of the 6th Fleet with operations in the western Atlantic as a unit of the 2nd Fleet.

On her Mediterranean cruises, she joined other units of the 6th Fleet in bi-national and multinational amphibious exercises. She was also on hand in Greek waters in April 1967, as part of the back-up force protecting American lives and property during the takeover by the military junta in Athens. When assigned to the 2d Fleet, Telfair operated from Norfolk and cruised the Atlantic seaboard, in the Caribbean and in the Gulf of Mexico. She was normally engaged in amphibious exercises with Marines from Camp Lejeune, though she also conducted summer training cruises for midshipmen of the US Naval Academy at Annapolis, Maryland.

In October 1964, she participated in Operation Steel Pike the largest peacetime amphibious landing exercise in history. She landed in Huelva, Spain, with 84 naval ships and 28,000 marines. Afterwards she stopped for liberty at Funchal, on the island of Madeira and then Santa Cruz de Tenerife, Canary Islands, Spain.

==== Final decommission ====
On 31 October 1968, Telfair was decommissioned for the third and final time at the Naval Amphibious Base Little Creek, Little Creek, Virginia. On the following day, her name was struck from the Navy List. On 26 June 1969, she was transferred to MARAD once more, this time for simultaneous transfer to her purchaser, the Boston Metals Company, of Baltimore, Maryland. She was sold for $103,600.66, and withdrawn from the fleet 14 July 1969.

== Awards ==
Telfair earned one battle star for World War II and three battle stars during the Korean War.

== Notes ==
Citations

== Bibliography ==
Online resources

- "Telfair". Dictionary of American Naval Fighting Ships. Naval History and Heritage Command. 25 September 2015. This article incorporates text from this source, which is in the public domain.
- "Kaiser Permanente No. 2, Richmond CA". www.ShipbuildingHistory.com. 13 October 2010.
- "USS Telfair (LPA-210)". NavSource. 30 October 2015.
- "TELFAIR (APA-210)". United States Department of Transportation. Archived from the original on 26 February 2015.
