= USS Clermont =

Attack transport ship in United States Navy

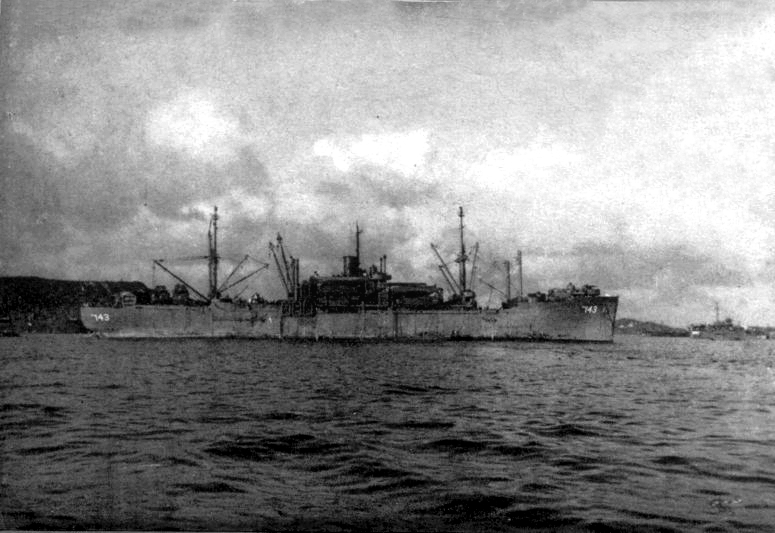

History

United States
- Name: USS Clermont
- Namesake: Clermont County, Ohio
- Builder: California Shipbuilding Corporation
- Laid down: 27 September 1944
- Launched: 25 November 1944
- Acquired: 27 January 1945
- Commissioned: 28 January 1945
- Decommissioned: 1 March 1946
- Stricken: 20 March 1946
- Fate: Sold for scrap, 9 April 1973

General characteristics
- Class & type: Haskell-class attack transport
- Displacement: 6,873 tons (lt), 14,837 t (fl)
- Length: 455 ft (139 m)
- Beam: 62 ft (19 m)
- Draft: 24 ft (7 m)
- Propulsion: 1 × geared turbine, 2 × header-type boilers, 1 × propeller, designed 8,500 shp (6,338 kW)
- Speed: 17 knots (31 km/h; 20 mph)
- Boats & landing craft carried: 2 × LCM; 12 × LCVP; 3 × LCPL
- Capacity: Troops: 86 officers, 1,475 enlisted; Cargo: 150,000 cu ft, 2,900 tons
- Complement: 56 officers, 480 enlisted
- Armament: 1 × 5"/38 dual-purpose gun; 4 × twin 40 mm guns; 10 × single 20 mm guns; late armament, add 1 × 40 mm quad mount

USS Clermont (APA-143) was a Haskell-class attack transport in service with the United States Navy from 1945 to 1946. She was scrapped in 1973.

== History ==
Clermont (APA-143) was launched 25 November 1944 by California Shipbuilding Corp., Wilmington, Los Angeles, under a United States Maritime Commission contract; sponsored by Mrs. F. Wells; acquired by the Navy 27 January 1945; converted at Kaiser Co., Inc., Vancouver, Washington; and commissioned 28 January 1945.

Clermont sailed from Port Chicago, California, 10 April 1945 for Pearl Harbor, arriving 16 April. Here she conducted training, then embarked the 126th Construction Battalion. She cleared Pearl Harbor 20 May, for Eniwetok, Ulithi, and Okinawa, arriving 24 June to disembark her troops and cargo. She returned to San Francisco 21 July to embark passengers for Pearl Harbor, arriving there 9 August. After taking Marine units and the 116th Naval Construction Battalion on board, she cleared 1 September for Saipan and Sasebo, where she put her passengers ashore for the occupation of Sasebo Naval Base. After a voyage to the Philippines to carry additional occupation troops to Japan, she carried units of the 5th Marines from Sasebo to Peleliu and sailed on 3 November with homeward bound servicemen to San Diego, arriving 23 November. Clermont made a second "Operation Magic Carpet" voyage between 8 December 1945 and 11 January 1946. Eleven days later she sailed for Norfolk, Virginia, arriving 4 February.

=== Decommissioning and fate ===
Clermont was decommissioned 1 March 1946, and returned to the United States Maritime Commission 3 March 1946. Ex-Clermont was laid up in the National Defense Reserve Fleet at James River, Virginia. Between 8 July and 28 September 1955 she was withdrawn from the Reserve Fleet for a Repair Program, GAA- Polarus, and returned. Ex-Clermont was sold for $111,560 to Union Minerals & Alloys Corporation for scrapping on 9 April 1973. In September 1973 (Note: There is a discrepancy on the specific date the ship was withdrawn. It is listed as possibly 12 or 21 September.) she was withdrawn from the Reserve Fleet and sent to the breaker's yard.

== Awards ==
Clermont received one battle star for World War II service at Okinawa.
