= USS Sherburne =

US Navy World War II Haskell class ship

USS Sherburne (APA-205)
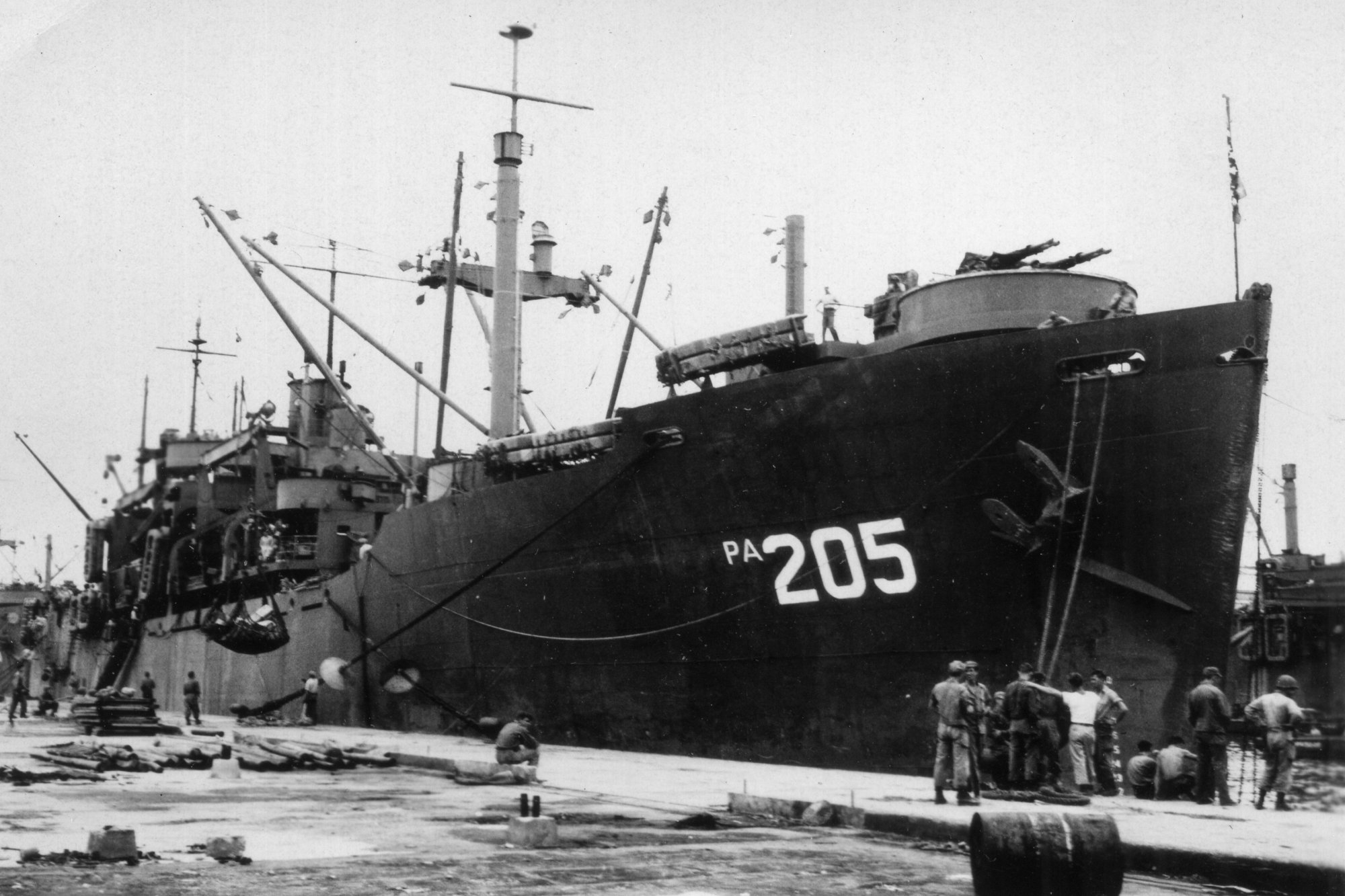
- USS Sherburne (APA-205), moored pier side at Yokohama, Japan in September 1945.

History

United States
- Name: Sherburne
- Namesake: Sherburne County, Minnesota
- Ordered: As a Type VC2-S-AP5 hull, MCE hull 553
- Builder: Permanente Metals Corporation, Richmond, California
- Yard number: 553
- Laid down: 18 May 1944
- Launched: 10 July 1944
- Sponsored by: Mrs. Mary Sernach
- Commissioned: 20 September 1944
- Decommissioned: 3 August 1946
- Stricken: 1 October 1958
- Identification: Hull symbol: APA-205; Code letters: NPNR
- Honors and awards: 1 × battle stars (World War II)
- Fate: Laid up in the Pacific Reserve Fleet, Stockton Group, 3 August 1946; Returned to the Maritime Administration (MARAD), 9 September 1958, laid up in the Suisun Bay Reserve Fleet; Reacquired by the US Navy, 22 October 1969
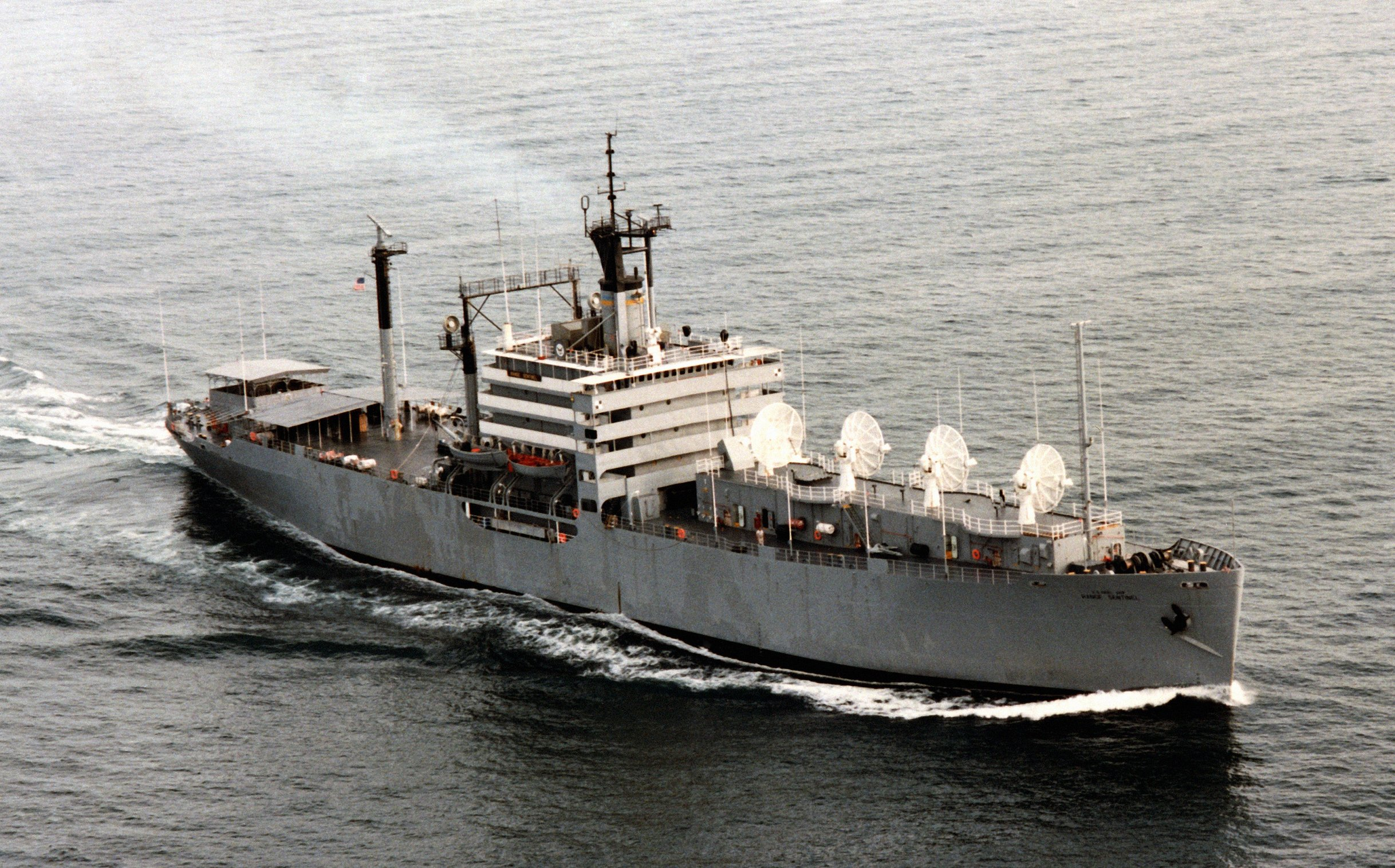
- USNS Range Sentinel (T-AGM-22), underway in 1985.

United States
- Name: Range Sentinel
- Operator: Military Sealift Command (MSC)
- Acquired: 22 October 1969
- In service: 21 October 1971
- Out of service: 12 June 1997
- Renamed: 26 April 1971
- Reclassified: AGM-22, 16 April 1969
- Stricken: 3 May 1999
- Identification: Hull symbol: T-AGM-22; Code letters: NBOY; IMO number: 8835554
- Fate: Scrapped by BB Metals, Sparrows Point, Maryland

General characteristics APA Specifications
- Class & type: Haskell-class attack transport
- Type: Type VC2-S-AP5
- Displacement: 6,873 long tons (6,983 t) (light load); 14,837 long tons (15,075 t) (full load)
- Length: 455 ft (139 m)
- Beam: 62 ft (19 m)
- Draft: 24 ft (7.3 m)
- Installed power: 2 × Combustion Engineering header-type boilers, 465 psi (3,210 kPa) 750 °F (399 °C); 8,500 shp (6,338 kW)
- Propulsion: 1 × Westinghouse geared turbine; 1 x propeller
- Speed: 17.7 kn (32.8 km/h; 20.4 mph)
- Boats & landing craft carried: 2 × LCMs; 1 × open LCPL; 18 × LCVPs; 2 × LCPRs; 1 × closed LCPL (Captain's Gig)
- Capacity: 2,900 long tons (2,900 t) DWT; 150,000 cu ft (4,200 m^{3}) (non-refrigerated)
- Troops: 87 officers, 1,475 enlisted
- Complement: 56 officers, 480 enlisted
- Armament: 1 × 5 in (127 mm)/38 caliber dual purpose gun; 1 × quad 40 mm (1.6 in) Bofors anti-aircraft (AA) gun mounts; 4 × twin 40mm Bofors (AA) gun mounts; 10 × single 20 mm (0.8 in) Oerlikon cannons AA mounts

Service record
- Part of: TransRon 14
- Operations: Assault and occupation of Okinawa Gunto (1 May–30 June 1945)
- Awards: USS Sherburne; American Campaign Medal; Asiatic–Pacific Campaign Medal; World War II Victory Medal; Navy Occupation Service Medal; Philippine Liberation Medal; USNS Range Sentinel; Navy Battle "E" Ribbon; National Defense Service Medal

USS Sherburne (APA-205) was a United States Navy Haskell-class attack transport, built and used during World War II. She was of the VC2-S-AP5 Victory ship design type. Sherburne was named for Sherburne County, Minnesota. She was later converted and renamed USS Range Sentinel (AGM-22), a missile range instrumentation ship.

== Construction ==
Sherburne was laid down under United States Maritime Commission (MARCOM) contract, MC hull 553, on 18 May 1944, by the Permanente Metals Corporation, Yard No. 2,Richmond, California; launched on 10 July 1944; sponsored by Mrs. Mary Sernach; and commissioned on 20 September 1944.

== Service history ==
=== World War II ===
==== Training vessel ====
Following commissioning, Sherburne proceeded to the Naval Supply Depot at Oakland, California. She remained in the San Francisco area until getting under way for San Pedro, Los Angeles for shakedown training which she completed on 20 October. The ship then returned to San Francisco to become a training vessel for APA and AP crews being assembled at the Precommissioning Training Center at Treasure Island. During her duty as a training vessel, 24 October to 22 December, she embarked the officers and men of 19 ships for periods of one to five days each for short cruises to the operating areas off Point Reyes. They were given training in ship handling, emergency drills, and in surface and anti-aircraft firing.

Upon completion of brief repairs at the Bethlehem Steel Co. in San Francisco, she got underway on 12 January 1945 toward San Diego for amphibious training. From 14 to 29 January, the ship underwent strenuous training in all phases of amphibious operations; and, on completion of this duty, she returned to the San Francisco area to load cargo.

==== Pacific service ====
On 15 February, Sherburne departed San Francisco for Hawaii and arrived at Pearl Harbor on the morning of 21 February. On 20 March, the ship embarked her first contingent of troops and got underway with a convoy bound for the Marshall Islands. She arrived at Eniwetok on 28 March; and, after discharging cargo, proceeded to Kwajalein, arriving there on 31 March; and then to Ulithi which she reached on 6 April. She discharged cargo and troops at both ports. At Ulithi, she embarked a group of marines; and, on 15 April, the ship headed for Guam, arriving at Apra Harbor the following day. After embarking another group of Marines on 20 April, the ship continued on to Saipan, arriving the next day. On 23 April, she embarked a group of Army troops; and, four days later, the ship sailed in convoy for Okinawa.

Sherburne arrived off Okinawa late in the afternoon of 1 May, and immediately began debarking troops and cargo. Operations were delayed by bad weather and air attacks; but, on the morning of 4 May, the ship completed offloading and got underway to return to Ulithi, arriving at that base on 9 May. Sailing the next day, she moored at San Francisco on 24 May. There she embarked troops; and, on 2 June, again sailed for the forward area, this time to the Philippines. She refueled at Eniwetok and Ulithi, and arrived at Manila on the morning of 23 May. On 4 July, she loaded Army troops for Cebu and delivered them there two days later. She then proceeded via Leyte to Biak, where she arrived on 11 July. There she loaded Army troops and sailed for Zamboanga, where she disembarked some of her troops on 17 July. Arriving at Manila two days later, she put the rest of her troops and cargo ashore and shifted to Subic Bay on 25 July for minor repairs and upkeep.

On 4 August 1945, Sherburne sailed for Lucena in Tayabas Bay, Luzon, for amphibious training of Army troops. This duty was abruptly terminated at mid-month by the Empire of Japanese capitulation. The ship immediately returned via Manila to Batangas Bay to load troops of the 1st Cavalry Division and the 11th Airborne Division for the occupation of the Tokyo region. Loading was completed on 24 August; and, on the following day, the ship was underway in convoy for Yokohama, Japan. The convoy entered Tokyo Bay early on the morning of 2 September, and proceeded up the bay. Sherburne passed Missouri at approximately the time of the reading of the surrender document on board that battleship. As the transport dropped anchor off the Yokohama breakwater, her radio receiver was announcing the final signature of the document. Debarkation of troops was completed in the afternoon; and, on the following day, the ship moored alongside a Yokohama pier to discharge cargo. Unloading was completed that evening; and, on 4 September, the ship was under way to return to Zamboanga for another contingent of occupation troops.

On 11 September, Sherburne put into Leyte for fuel and supplies; then continued to Zamboanga, arriving on 16 September. Loading of troops and cargo of the 41st Infantry Division was completed on 19 September. After picking up more troops and boats at Bugo, Mindanao, the ship sailed from Abuyog, Leyte, on 22 September for Kure, Japan. On 23 September, the convoy was diverted to Okinawa because of a delay in preparations at its destination; and the ship anchored in Buckner Bay, Okinawa, the same day. She was forced to sea from 28 September to 1 October to evade Tropical Storm Kate; and, on 2 October, got underway for Japan. The ship entered Bungo Suido early on 5 October; and, after cautiously passing through a succession of mined areas in the Inland Sea, reached Hiro Wan the next day. Debarkation of troops and cargo began immediately and was completed on 8 October.

==== Operation Magic Carpet ====
Sherburne was next scheduled for duty in "Operation Magic Carpet" to return servicemen to the United States; but she was diverted to Okinawa where, from 12 October to 14 November, she served as accommodation ship for a total of over 1,400 survivors of mine vessels and other craft wrecked there in a recent typhoon. On 28 November, the transport arrived at Seattle, Washington, with a group of homeward-bound servicemen from Okinawa. After a month of repairs, she sailed on 28 December, for Okinawa where, after embarking more troops between 15 and 21 January, she delivered them at San Francisco on 5 February.

=== Post-war ===
Sherburne was decommissioned on 3 August 1946; and, after a decade in reserve in Navy custody, was transferred to the Maritime Administration (MARAD) at Suisun Bay, California, 9 September 1958. She was stricken from the Navy List on 1 October 1958.

=== Reactivation as Range Sentinel ===
Over 20 years after her decommissioning, Sherburne was called back to active duty to support the Navy's Polaris and Poseidon fleet ballistic missile flight test program. She was reclassified as a range tracking vessel, AGM-22, on 16 April 1969, and was reacquired from MARAD and reinstated on the Navy list on 22 October 1969. She began conversion at the Northwest Marine Iron Works, Portland, Oregon, on 28 October 1969, renamed Range Sentinel on 26 April 1971, and delivered to the Military Sealift Command (MSC) on 21 October 1971, and placed in service, Sven Rydberg, master. Her conversion included the latest communications, navigation, and missile tracking and monitoring equipment. Range Sentinel continued in service into 1974, as a unit of the MSC Special Projects Fleet, home ported at Port Canaveral, Florida.

== Fate ==
Range Sentinel was placed out of service at Port Canaveral, 12 June 1997, and again struck from the Naval Register, 3 May 1999. On 19 September 2000, she was laid up in MARAD's James River Reserve Fleet, Fort Eustis, Virginia, with permanent Title transfer 28 July 2001.

Range Sentinel was in the James River Reserve Fleet under the care of MARAD, until 19 June 2012, when she was withdrawn from the reserve fleet under domestic sale. In November 2012, she was scrapped by BB Metals, Sparrow's Point, Maryland.

== Awards ==
Sherburne received one battle star for her World War II service.

== Notes ==
Citations

== Bibliography ==
Online resources

- "Sherburne". Dictionary of American Naval Fighting Ships. Naval History and Heritage Command. 9 September 2015. This article incorporates text from this source, which is in the public domain.
- "Kaiser Permanente No. 2, Richmond CA". ShipbuildingHistory.com. 13 October 2010.
- "USNS Range Sentinel (T-AGM-22)". NavSource. 25 April 2014.
- "SHERBURNE (APA-205)". United States Department of Transportation. Archived from the original on 25 September 2015.
- "National Defense Reserve Fleet Inventory" (PDF). United States Maritime Administration. 30 June 2012. Archived from the original (PDF) on 23 February 2013.

Journals

- Haber, Gary (17 October 2012). "BB Metals to hire 55 in Sparrows Point as part of federal contract". Baltimore Business Journal.
