= USS Lander =

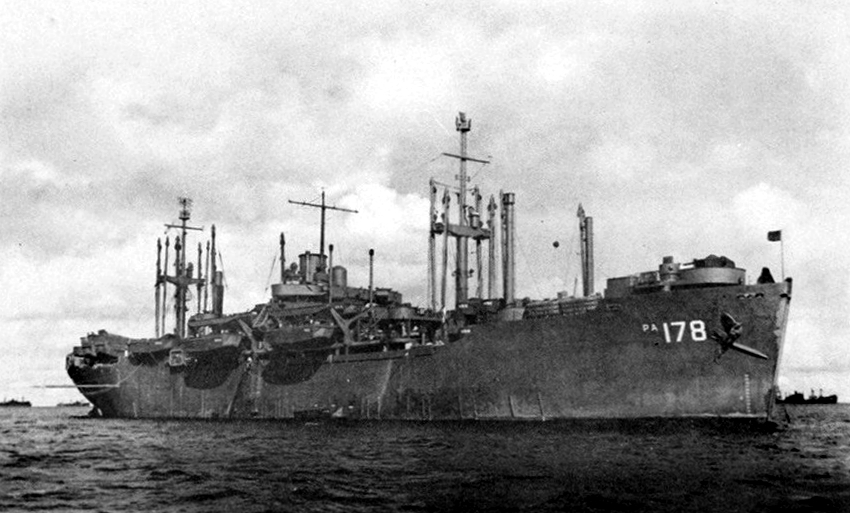

History

United States
- Name: USS Lander
- Namesake: Lander County, Nevada
- Ordered: as VC2-S-AP5 hull, MCV hull 144
- Laid down: 9 October 1944
- Launched: 19 November 1944
- Acquired: 8 December 1944
- Commissioned: USS Lander (APA-178), 9 December 1944
- Decommissioned: 29 March 1946
- In service: Redesignated (LPA-178), 14 August 1968
- Stricken: 1 September 1983
- Fate: Scrapped 1983

General characteristics
- Displacement: 6,873 t.(lt) 14,837 t.(fl)
- Length: 455 ft (139 m)
- Beam: 62 ft (19 m)
- Propulsion: one Westinghouse geared turbine, two Babcock & Wilcox header-type boilers, one propeller, design shaft horsepower 8,500
- Speed: 17 kts.
- Boats & landing craft carried: 2 LCM; 12 LCVP; 3 LCPU
- Capacity: 150,000 cu. ft, 2,900 tons
- Complement: 536
- Armament: one 5 in (130 mm) dual-purpose gun mount, twelve 40 mm gun mounts, ten single 20 mm gun mounts

USS Lander (APA/LPA-178) was a Haskell-class attack transport in service with the United States Navy from 1944 to 1946. She was sold for scrapping in 1983.

== History ==
Lander was laid down 9 October 1944 by Oregon Shipbuilding Corp., Portland, Oregon, under a United States Maritime Commission contract; launched 19 November 1944; sponsored by Mrs. H. C. McVean Jr.; acquired by the Navy 8 December 1944; and commissioned 9 December 1944 at Astoria, Oregon.

=== World War II ===
After shakedown, Lander operated off the California coast until she departed San Pedro, Los Angeles, 9 February 1945 for the western Pacific.

Steaming via Pearl Harbor, the attack transport reached Eniwetok 28 February, joined units of task force TF 51, and sailed 2 March for Iwo Jima. She sighted the embattled island 6 March and cruised in a holding area before dropping anchor 14 March. She embarked U.S. Marine casualties and loaded cargo, then sailed for Guam 20 March. Arriving the 22d, she embarked additional marines and departed the next day for Pearl Harbor where she arrived 4 April.

Carrying troops and cargo, the attack transport departed 20 May for the Ryukyus. Steaming via the Marshall Islands and Ulithi, she arrived Okinawa 7 June and landed her troops as reinforcements. After embarking 220 military passengers and 560 enemy prisoners, she sailed 11 June and transferred troops and POW's at Ulithi 17 June. Departing the 18th, Lander embarked additional passengers at Manus, Admiralties; Eniwetok, Roi Namur, and Kwajalein, Marshall Islands; and Pearl Harbor before arriving San Francisco 17 July.

As the war drew to a close, Lander transported 1,436 troops to Eniwetok, arriving 17 August. Proceeding 25 August, she steamed via Ulithi to the Philippines and arrived Manila 7 September. On two cruises from 20 September to 21 October, she carried occupation troops and equipment between the Philippines and Japan. After joining the "Operation Magic Carpet" fleet 24 October, she sailed from Matsuyama, Japan, 27 October; embarked 1,934 homebound veterans at Saipan; and departed 1 November for San Francisco, California, where she arrived 14 November.

Sailing for the western Pacific 29 November, she embarked military passengers at Guam 15 December and returned them to San Pedro, Los Angeles, 28 December. Lander departed for San Francisco 21 January 1946. then sailed 28 January for the U.S. East Coast.

=== Decommissioning and fate ===
Arriving Norfolk, Virginia, 16 February, she decommissioned 29 March. Transferred to the United States Maritime Commission 1 April, she was placed in the National Defense Reserve Fleet and was berthed at James River, Virginia. She was redesignated Amphibious Transport (LPA-178) on 14 August 1968 and was struck from the Naval Register 1 September 1983. On 17 September 1983, she was sold for scrapping of by MARAD Desgueces Aviles S.A., Spain. Lander was scrapped between October 1983 and March 1984.

== Awards ==
Lander received two battle stars for World War II service.
