= USS Colbert =

American attack transport

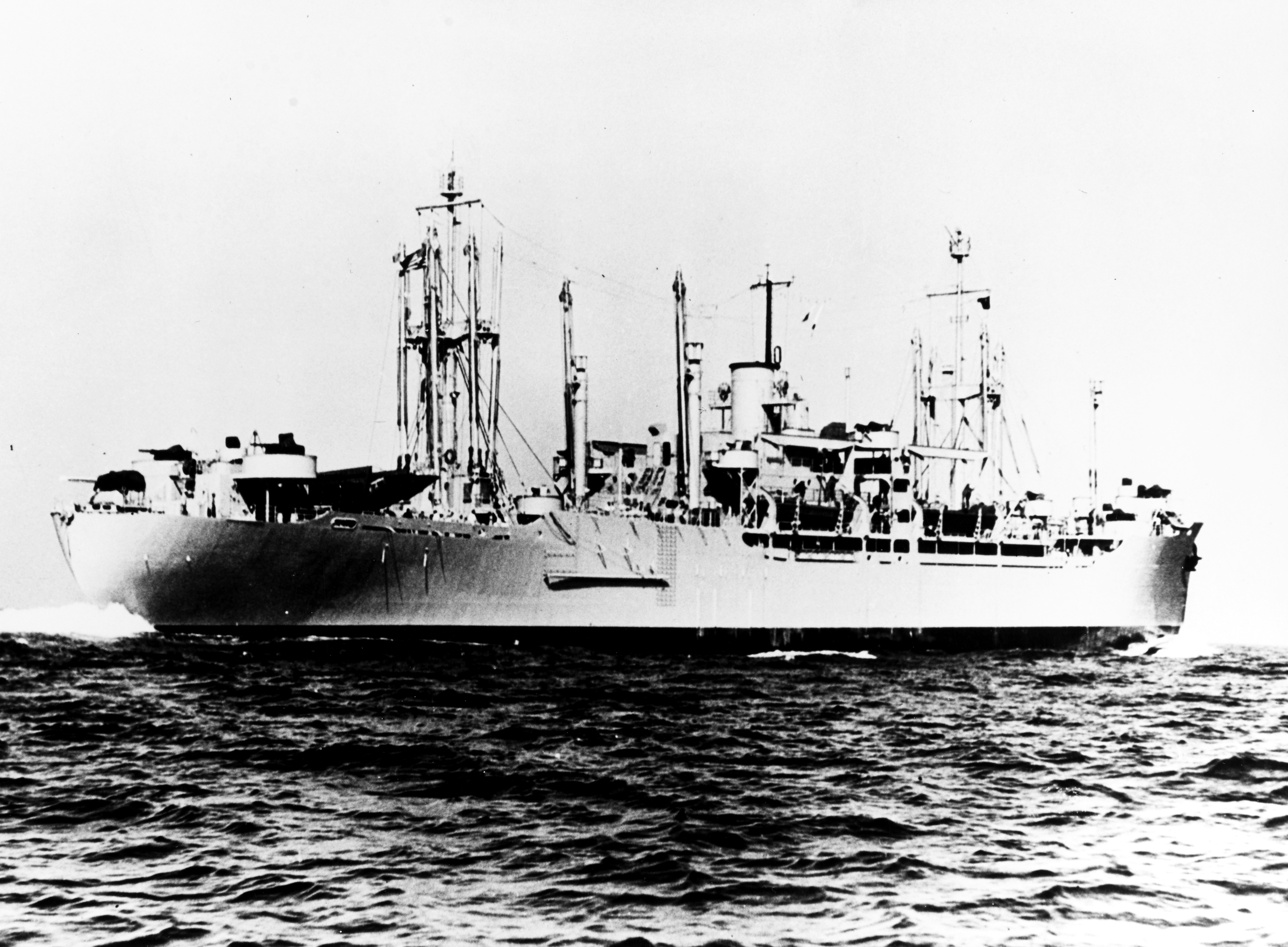

History

United States
- Name: USS Colbert
- Namesake: Colbert County, Alabama
- Ordered: as type VC2-S-AP5
- Laid down: 30 September 1944
- Launched: 1 December 1944
- Acquired: 7 February 1945
- Commissioned: 7 February 1945
- Decommissioned: 26 February 1946
- Stricken: 12 March 1946
- Fate: Scrapped 1974

General characteristics
- Displacement: 15199 tons (full load)
- Length: 455 ft 0 in (138.68 m)
- Beam: 62 ft 0 in (18.90 m)
- Draught: 24 ft 3 in (7.39 m)
- Propulsion: Single Screw
- Speed: 19 knots
- Complement: 536
- Armament: one 5 in (130 mm) gun mount, twelve 40 mm gun mounts, ten 20 mm gun mounts

USS Colbert (APA-145) was a Haskell-class attack transport in service with the United States Navy from 1945 to 1946. She was scrapped in 1974.

== History ==
Colbert was launched 1 December 1944 by California Shipbuilding Corp., Wilmington, California, under a Maritime Commission contract; sponsored by Mrs. L. G. Miller; acquired 7 February 1945 and commissioned the same day.

Colbert sailed from San Francisco, 15 April 1945 with passengers for Honolulu, where she remained from 21 April to 20 May, disembarking her original troops and loading reinforcements for Okinawa, where she arrived 7 June. She sailed on to Ulithi to load Japanese and Korean prisoners of war, with whom she returned to Pearl Harbor 28 June.

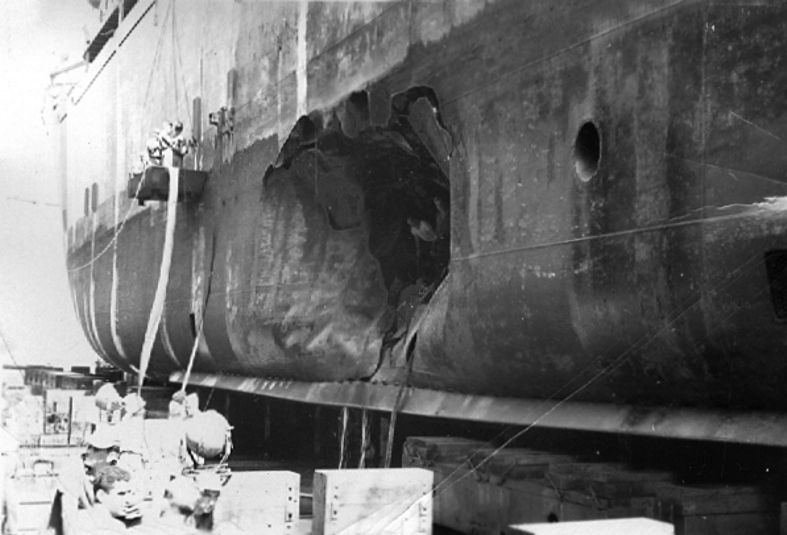
Colbert after being hit by a mine on 17 September 1945.

After a brief stateside overhaul, Colbert put to sea 21 July 1945 to carry troops to Ulithi and Okinawa, where she lay until 5 September. She voyaged to Jinsen, Korea, and Dairen, Manchuria, to embark Allied soldiers and sailors formerly held prisoner at Mukden, Manchuria, and returned to Okinawa 16 September.

Next day she put to sea to evade a typhoon, and that same day struck a floating mine, which caused the death of three men and damaged the ship extensively. Towed back to Okinawa 18 September, she was later towed to Guam, Pearl Harbor, and San Francisco for repairs, reaching the west coast of the United States 30 January 1946.

=== Decommissioning and fate ===
On 26 February 1946, she was decommissioned and transferred to the War Shipping Administration at Suisun Bay, California. She remained in reserve fleet until she was sold for scrapping on 21 August 1974, to Nicolai Joffe Corpiration, Beverly Hills, California (USA). She was delivered on 18 September 1974.

== Awards ==
Colbert received one battle star for World War II service.
