= USS Magoffin =

1944 attack transport ship in the United States Navy

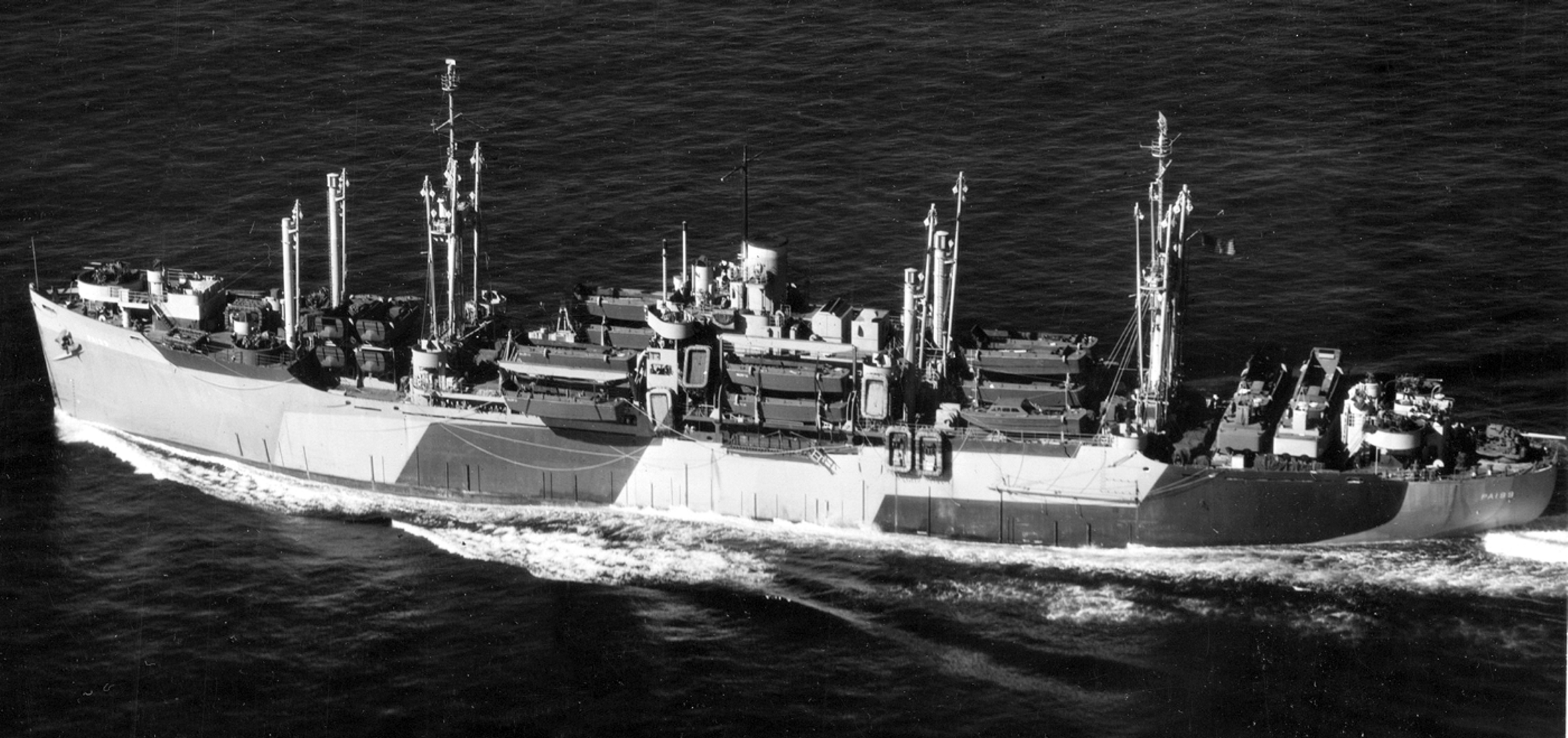
- Magoffin on 15 November 1944

History

United States
- Name: USS Magoffin
- Namesake: Magoffin County, Kentucky
- Ordered: as type VC2-S-AP5
- Laid down: 20 June 1944
- Launched: 4 October 1944
- Commissioned: 25 October 1944
- Decommissioned: 14 August 1946
- In service: 4 October 1950
- Out of service: 10 April 1968
- Stricken: 1 February 1980
- Home port: San Diego, California
- Fate: Scrapped 1980

General characteristics
- Displacement: 14,833 (full load)
- Length: 455 ft 0 in (138.68 m)
- Beam: 62 ft 0 in (18.90 m)
- Draught: 28 ft 1 in (8.56 m)
- Speed: 17 knots (31 km/h)
- Boats & landing craft carried: two LCM, twelve LCVP, three LCPU
- Capacity: 150,000 cu. ft, 2,900 tons
- Complement: 56 Officers 480 Enlisted
- Armament: one 5 in (130 mm) gun mount; twelve 40 mm gun mounts; ten 20 mm gun mounts

USS Magoffin (APA/LPA-199) was a Haskell-class attack transport in service with the United States Navy from 1944 to 1946 and from 1950 to 1968. She was scrapped in 1980.

== History ==
Magoffin (APA 199), built under Maritime Commission contract, launched 4 October 1944 by Kaiser Shipbuilding Co., Vancouver, Washington; sponsored by Mrs. Fred Schlotfeldt; and commissioned 25 October 1944.

=== World War II ===
Attached to Transport Division 54 during post commissioning amphibious training off the coast of southern California, Magoffin conveyed troops and cargo in the South Pacific until 1 March 1945. On that date she commenced rehearsals at Guadalcanal for the invasion of the Ryukyus. Underway on the 27th, she steamed with the invasion force for Okinawa, where she participated in the landings 1 April. During the battle for Okinawa, Magoffin, the first ship in Transport Division 54 to be unloaded, assisted in downing two enemy planes. After this campaign Magoffin carried men and cargo between the United States and forward area bases until the following spring. On 10 March 1946, she reported to the 19th Fleet, San Francisco, California, for inactivation. She decommissioned 14 August 1946.

=== Korean War ===
After the outbreak of the Korean War, Magoffin recommissioned 4 October 1950 and was assigned to the U.S. Pacific Fleet. Departing San Francisco 22 March 1951, she steamed for Japan where she debarked troops and cargo 7 to 8 April. Magoffin remained in the western Pacific Ocean conveying troops and cargo between Japan and Korea and participating in amphibious exercises, two at Sagami Wan, Japan, and one in Korea. She headed for the U.S. West Coast late in August, arriving at San Diego, California, 8 September for landing exercises and overhaul. Magoffin again sailed for the Far East 10 July 1952. Arriving a month later at Yufusu, Japan, she commenced a series of amphibious training exercises with Army and Marine units; two exercises were held in Japan and two at Inchon, Korea. She also participated in an amphibious demonstration staged 15 October off Kojo, North Korea, in an effort to draw reserve Communist units in the area out into the open. In November, she returned to San Diego for exercises and operations along the U.S. west coast. With the exception of one voyage to Japan and back in late August 1953, she operated on the U.S. west coast until departing for the western Pacific in February 1954. Amphibious operations at Iwo Jima, Okinawa, and Busan, Korea, were followed, in August, by orders to Indochina. Arriving at Haiphong, she embarked refugees for transport to Saigon. By 17 September Magoffin had carried over 6,000 refugees from tyranny to South Vietnam. Following this "Operation Passage to Freedom" duty, she returned to San Diego, arriving 21 November 1954.

=== Cold War ===
From that day to the end of her Navy service, Magoffin has operated, with the exception of the years 1959, 1960, 1963, and 1966, in the western Pacific for at least 6 months out of each year. Two of the more historically eventful years during this period were 1958 and 1964. In the spring of 1958, the transport participated in Operation Hardtack I, the 1958 series of nuclear tests at Eniwetok Atoll.

Shortly after the tests, the mid July politico military flareups in the volatile Middle East caused the ship to embark troops at Okinawa and head for the Persian Gulf. This deployment was to provide support, if necessary, to the British and American forces sent into Jordan and Lebanon. However, tension eased after the Navy's resolute action averted Communist subversion in Lebanon, allowing Magoffin to return to her U.S. 7th Fleet station.

=== Vietnam War ===
6 August 1964 saw Magoffin, having completed a 6-month tour with the U.S. 7th Fleet and heading for her home port of San Diego, ordered back to Okinawa to embark troops. The ship then steamed for Vietnam, following the Tonkin Gulf Resolution. Magoffin’s tours on the U.S. west coast continued to include periodic overhauls, coastal operations, and amphibious exercises. Her tours in the western Pacific were in support of operations in Southeast Asia, transporting troops and cargo, participating in amphibious operations, and, on occasion, serving as station ship in Da Nang harbor. In August, 1965, Magoffin transported 3rd Battalion, 1st Marines to Okinawa for additional training for eventual operations in South Vietnam.

== Decommissioning and fate ==
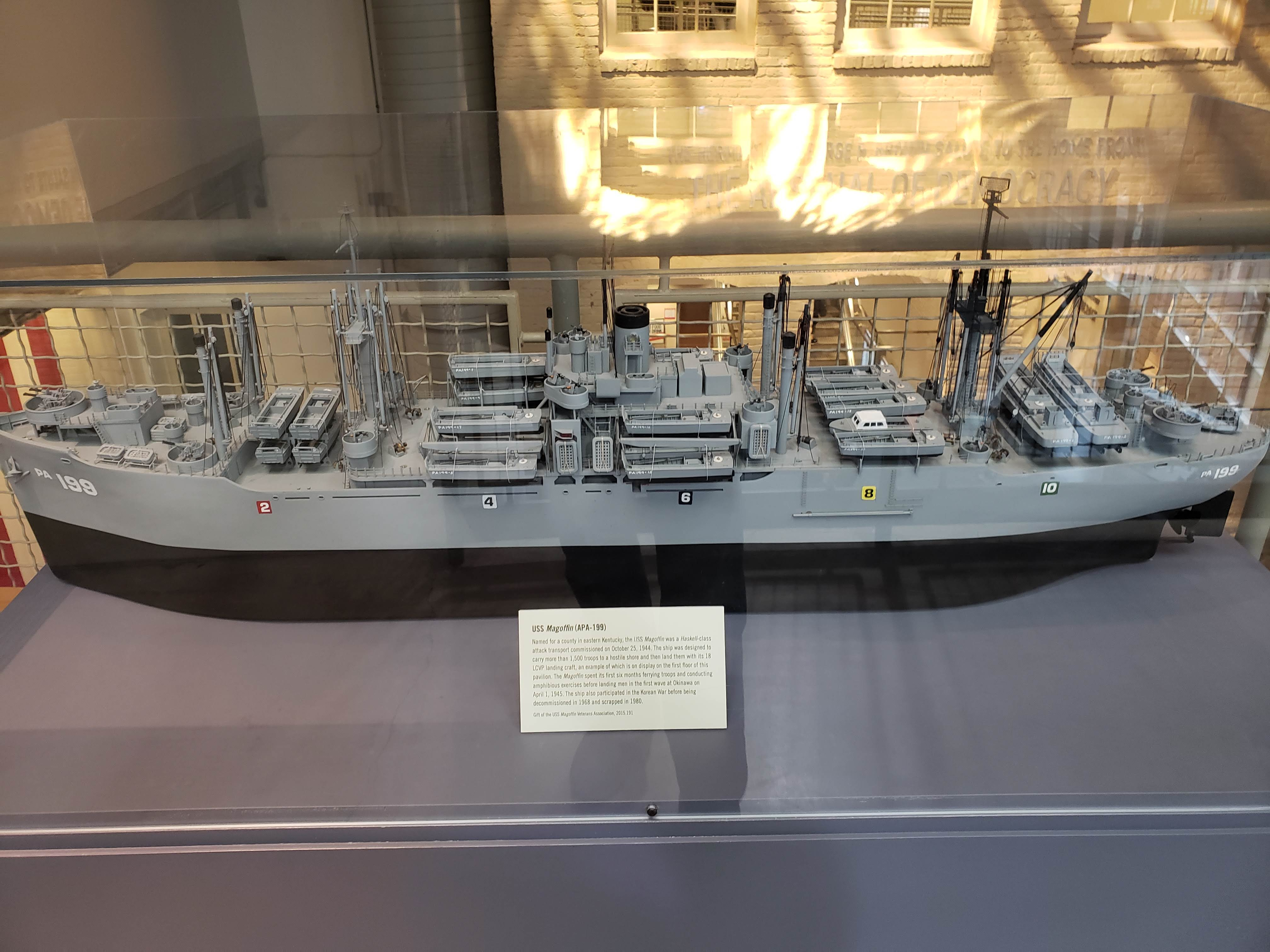
Model of the USS Magoffin at the National World War II Museum

Magoffin returned to San Diego 9 December 1967 to prepare for inactivation. She decommissioned 10 April 1968 and entered the Naval Defense Reserve Fleet at Suisun Bay, California, under the custody of the Maritime Administration. She was redesignated LPA-199 on 1 January 1969. Magoffin was sold for scrap in 1980.

== Awards ==
Magoffin received one battle star for World War II service at Okinawa. She received two more battle stars (campaign stars) during the Korean War during her efforts there during 1951 and 1952. She received an additional four campaign stars during the Vietnam War.
