= USS Haskell =

1944 Haskell-class attack transport

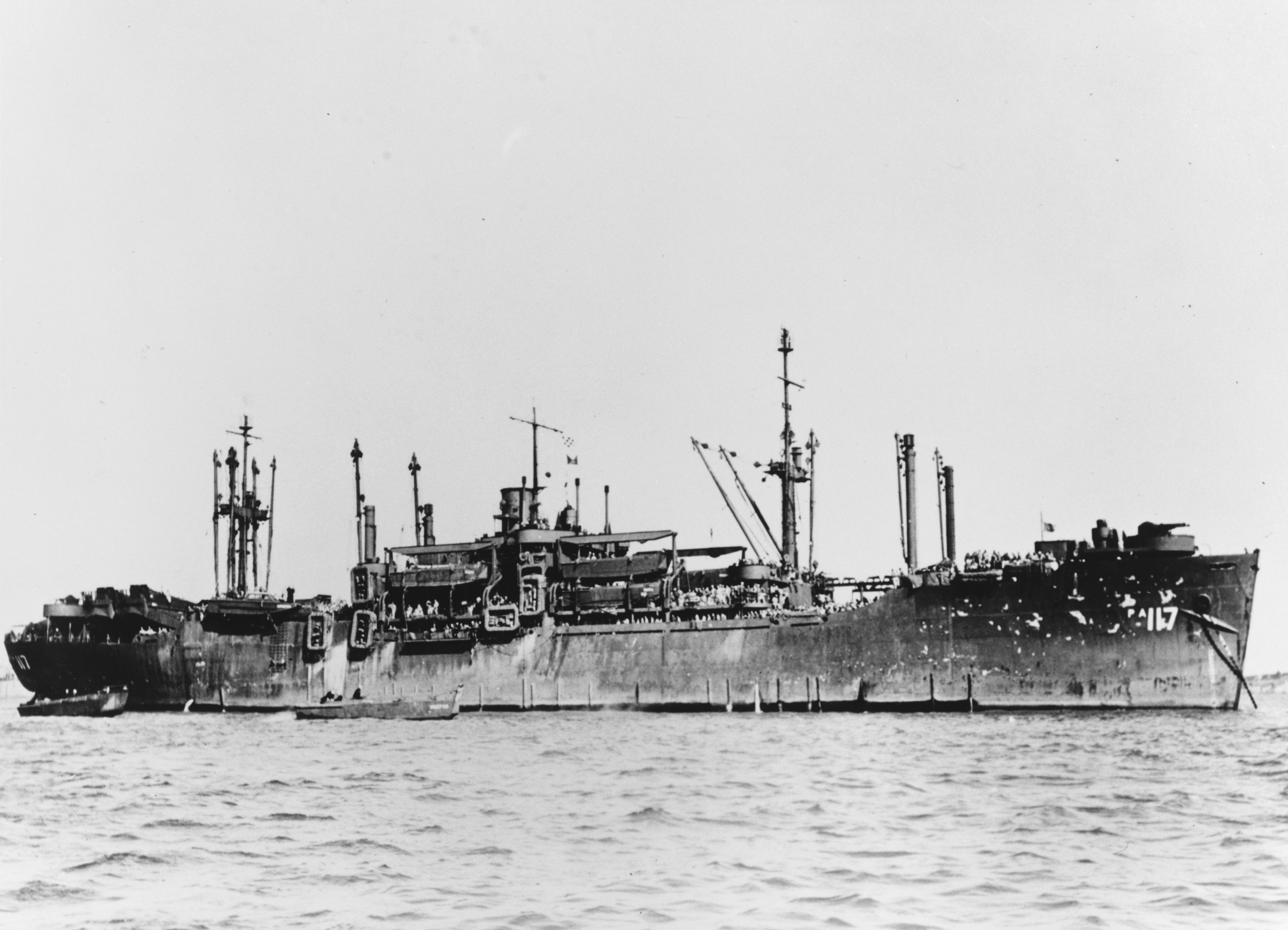
- USS Haskell (APA-117) at anchor, in late 1945.

History

United States
- Name: USS Haskell
- Namesake: Haskell County, Kansas; Haskell County, Oklahoma; Haskell County, Texas
- Builder: California Shipbuilding Corp.
- Launched: 13 June 1944
- Commissioned: 11 September 1944
- Decommissioned: 22 May 1946
- Honors and awards: 1 Battle star
- Fate: Sold for scrap, 26 June 1973

General characteristics
- Class & type: Haskell-class attack transport
- Displacement: 6,873 tons (lt), 14,837 t (fl)
- Length: 455 ft (139 m)
- Beam: 62 ft (19 m)
- Draft: 24 ft (7 m)
- Propulsion: 1 × geared turbine (Westinghouse, Joshua Hendy or Allis-Chalmers), 2 × header-type boilers (Babcock & Wilcox or Combustion Engineering), 1 × propeller, designed 8,500 shp (6,338 kW)
- Speed: 17 knots (31 km/h; 20 mph)
- Boats & landing craft carried: 2 × LCM; 12 × LCVP; 3 × LCPL
- Capacity: Troops: 86 officers, 1,475 enlisted; Cargo: 150,000 cu ft, 2,900 tons
- Complement: 56 officers, 480 enlisted
- Armament: 1 × 5"/38 dual-purpose gun; 4 × twin 40mm guns; 10 × single 20mm guns; late armament, add 1 × 40mm quad mount

USS Haskell (APA-117) was the lead ship of her class of attack transports, built for the United States Navy during World War II. She was of the VC2-S-AP5 Victory ship design type. Haskell was named for the Haskell Counties of Kansas, Oklahoma, and Texas.

== World War II service ==
Haskell was launched 13 June 1944 by California Shipbuilding Corp., Wilmington, Los Angeles, under United States Maritime Commission contract; sponsored by Mrs. W. L. Friedell, wife of the Commandant of the 11th Naval District; and commissioned 11 September 1944.

Following her shakedown cruise, Haskell arrived San Francisco 19 October and began loading troops and supplies destined for the Pacific. Underway 28 October, she set course for Finschafen New Guinea, and arrived 15 November 1944. Four days later the transport anchored at Biak Island to unload her troops, who were to take part in the developing New Guinea offensive.

Haskell sailed via Mios Woendi to Noemfoor Island, 23 November-2 December, where preparations were underway for the important landings at Lingayen Gulf, Philippines. At staging areas throughout the western Pacific ships such as Haskell loaded troops and made practice landings prior to the actual assault. After exercises at Japen Island, Haskell departed in convoy for the Philippines 4 January 1945. A part of Rear Admiral Conolly's reinforcement echelon, Haskell and the other transports arrived off Lingayen Gulf 11 January 2 days after the initial landings. Haskell's group escaped attack while sailing the treacherous route through the Philippines. After unloading her troops and cargo, Haskell departed the next day, but not before her gunners had shot down their first enemy aircraft during an air raid on the 11th.

The transport sailed to Leyte Gulf 15 January 1945, loaded troops, and took part in a practice landing at Tacloban, Leyte. The ship departed with Rear Admiral Struble's amphibious group 26 January for the Zambales landing north of Subic Bay, Luzon. This unopposed landing was carried out 3 days later and helped to cut off the Bataan Peninsula and hasten the fall of Manila. Haskell returned to Leyte Gulf 1 February 1945.

With control of the Philippines secured, Haskell was next assigned to the giant Okinawa operation. She completed loading troops and supplies at Leyte 13 March 1945 and after amphibious exercises sailed 27 March for Okinawa. This massive invasion, climax of the Pacific island-hopping campaign, began 1 April. Haskell was a member of Rear Admiral Hall's Southern Attack Force, and debarked units of the 7th Division with their equipment during the first waves of the assault. During the first days of the bitter struggle she also served as an emergency hospital ship and cared for many casualties at her off shore anchorage. After unloading her troops and cargo, the transport sailed 6 April for Saipan, Marianas, thus escaping the heavy Japanese air counterattacks so valiantly endured by the ships remaining at Okinawa. Stopping at Saipan only briefly, Haskell steamed independently via Eniwetok and Pearl Harbor to San Francisco, where she arrived 1 May.

The ship underwent needed repairs and embarked Navy and Coast Guard personnel for the Pacific and sailed the 23d for Nouméa. Arriving 9 June 1945, the ship began a series of transport voyages to various ports in the Pacific, providing men and cargo at Guadalcanal, Eniwetok, and Guam. She arrived Apra Harbor, Guam, 1 July and embarked 83 Japanese prisoners of war for transfer to Pearl Harbor, where she arrived 15 July. From Pearl Harbor Haskell sailed to San Francisco 22 July and Seattle 12 August.

While Haskell loaded at Seattle the war ended, and she assumed a new role, that of bringing occupation troops to the Pacific and transporting returnees to the United States. She sailed 20 August for Okinawa and after stops at Eniwetok and Ulithi arrived 11 September and unloaded her troops. Soon afterward, 16 September, the ship was forced to put to sea to ride out the giant typhoon which swept the area and after 2 days of grueling heavy weather returned to Okinawa.

Haskell's role was as a transport for over 1,400 allied prisoners of war released from enemy prison camps. These wasted veterans were offloaded at Manila 25 September, and the ship sailed for the United States 1 October, with 1,800 members of the "Eastern Air Forces" [possibly the Far Eastern or 5th Air Force -ed]. After a stop at Eniwetok, Haskell arrived San Francisco 19 October 1945.

As a unit of the "Magic-Carpet" fleet Haskell made two more voyages to the Far East during the gigantic task of returning American servicemen to their homes. These passages, to Okinawa and Japan, terminated with Haskell's arrival at Seattle, Wash., 2 February 1946. Designated for return to the Maritime Commission, the ship sailed to Norfolk, Virginia, via the Panama Canal, and arrived 21 March 1946. Haskell decommissioned 22 May 1946 and was returned 2 days later and placed in the National Defense Reserve Fleet at James River, Virginia.

== Fate ==
Ex-Haskell was removed from the Reserve Fleet in 1956 for a Repair Program, GAA-Moore McCormick Lines. Upon her return from the Repair Program she was berthed at Wilmington, North Carolina, On 1 March 1965 when she transferred back to James River, Virginia. On 26 June 1973, she was sold to Alberti Equipment, Incorporated, for $124,630, for scrapping. At 1040 EDT, on 30 July 1973 she was withdrawn from the Reserve Fleet and sent to the breaker's yard.

All that remains of Haskell is her brass builder's plate.

== Awards ==
Haskell received two battle stars for World War II service.
