= USS Sevier =

1944 Haskell-class attack transport

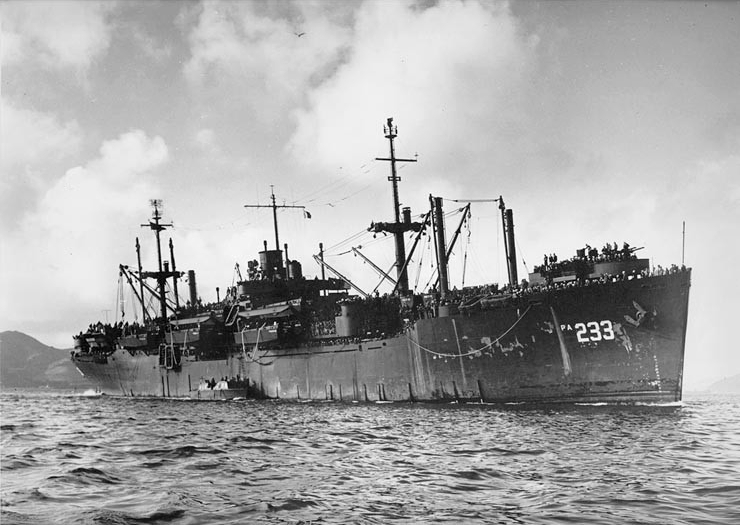
- Sevier, circa 1945

History

United States
- Name: USS Sevier (APA-233)
- Namesake: Sevier County, Arkansas; Sevier County, Tennessee; Sevier County, Utah
- Builder: Kaiser Shipbuilding
- Laid down: 4 October 1944
- Launched: 16 November 1944
- Sponsored by: Mrs Fred Lord
- Commissioned: 5 December 1944
- Decommissioned: 30 April 1947
- Reclassified: LPA-233, 1 January 1969
- Stricken: 23 June 1947
- Honours and awards: Two battle stars for World War II
- Fate: Sold for scrap, 15 February 1980

General characteristics
- Class & type: Haskell-class attack transport
- Displacement: 6,720 tons (lt), 14,837 t. (fl)
- Length: 455 ft
- Beam: 62 ft
- Draft: 24 ft
- Propulsion: 1 x Joshua Hendy geared turbine, 2 x Babcock & Wilcox header-type boilers, 1 x propeller, designed shaft horsepower 8,500
- Speed: 17.7 knots
- Boats & landing craft carried: 2 x LCM, 12 x LCVP, 3 x LCPU
- Capacity: 86 Officers 1,475 Enlisted
- Crew: 56 Officers, 480 enlisted
- Armament: 1 x 5"/38 caliber dual-purpose gun mount, 1 x quad 40mm gun mount, 4 x twin 40mm gun mounts, 10 x single 20mm gun mounts
- Notes: MCV Hull No. 679, hull type VC2-S-AP5

USS Sevier (APA-233) was a Haskell-class attack transport in service with the United States Navy from 1944 to 1947. She was scrapped in 1980.

== History ==
Sevier was named after counties in Arkansas, Tennessee, and Utah. She was laid down on 4 October 1944 under Maritime Commission contract (MC hull MCV 679) by Kaiser Shipbuilding of Vancouver, Washington; launched on 16 November 1944, and commissioned on 5 December 1944.

=== World War II ===
Sevier departed Seattle, Washington, on 20 December for San Pedro, California, where she underwent shakedown from 27 December 1944 to 26 January 1945. Sailing from Los Angeles on 6 February, she underwent a week of training near Pearl Harbor, and then continued westward to Eniwetok, where on 28 February, she joined a convoy bound for Iwo Jima.

==== Invasion of Iwo Jima ====
Sevier was held in a waiting station 100 miles (160 km) off the island of Iwo Jima until 14 March, when she anchored to evacuate marines of the 4th Division who had participated in the assault. Departing Iwo Jima on 20 March, she disembarked the marines at Maui, T. H., on 5 April; and then underwent repairs to her main thrust bearing from 6 to 30 April at Pearl Harbor.

Embarking 1,193 officers and men of the 125th Construction Battalion and 171 marines, Sevier left Pearl on 12 May with a convoy, which, after a brief stop at Eniwetok, arrived at Ulithi on 26 May.

==== Invasion of Okinawa ====
Sevier was held at Eniwetok until 13 June; and then ordered to Okinawa, where she arrived on 17 June. During her two days and nights anchored off Okinawa, Sevier worked continuously unloading the Seabees and marines and their equipment. Underway on 19 June, she witnessed the intensive air and sea bombardment of the southern end of the island, before setting course for the United States.

Sevier arrived at San Francisco on 13 July and then proceeded to the Everett Pacific Shipyard near Seattle for repairs to her propeller shaft. Sevier returned to San Francisco on 27 July, sailed for Pearl Harbor on 1 August, and arrived there on 7 August.

=== Post-war ===
Sevier joined in the celebration of VJ-Day at Pearl Harbor and, on 26–27 August, embarked troops at Hilo Harbor for the occupation of Japan. Sailing from Pearl on 1 September, she stopped at Saipan from 13 to 16 September and entered Sasebo, Japan, on 22 September where she unloaded her troops and supplies.

Underway three days later, she arrived at Manila on 30 September and then embarked more occupation troops in Lingayen Gulf from 3 to 6 October. Underway on 9 October, the transport arrived at Sasebo on 14 October and disembarked her troops between 20 and 22 October.

Assigned next to Operation Magic Carpet, Sevier sailed from Sasebo on 23 October; and, on 27 and 28 October, embarked servicemen at Saipan for the trip home to the United States. She disembarked them at San Francisco on 10 November, and, after moving to Bremerton, Washington, sailed from there on 24 November to bring home troops from Guam and Manus. Returning to Seattle on 29 December, Sevier remained inactive at Port Angeles from 31 December 1945 to 6 March 1946, when she was assigned further duties supporting occupation troops in the western Pacific.

After a voyage to Pearl Harbor and back, Sevier sailed from San Francisco on 16 April for Yokosuka where she arrived on 29 April. Sailing again on 3 May, she touched at Midway on 9 May; and then arrived at Pearl on 13 May. There, she was assigned the duty of evacuating personnel from Bikini in preparation for the atomic bomb tests.

Departing Pearl on 28 May, she was at Kwajalein and Bikini from 3 to 8 June before sailing for San Francisco, where she arrived on 18 June. She remained on the west coast until sailing on 7 September 1946 from San Diego for Yokosuka, where she arrived on 23 September.

The transport departed Yokosuka on 26 October and spent the next three months at anchor in Chinese ports: at Qingdao from 29 October 1946 to 15 January 1947 and at Chinwangtao from 16 to 22 January. Sailing for home, she stopped at Guam from 27 to 31 January and at Pearl Harbor from 8 to 13 February before arriving at San Francisco on 18 February to prepare for deactivation.

=== Decommissioning and fate ===
Sevier was decommissioned at Suisun Bay, California, on 30 April 1947 and delivered to the Maritime Commission's National Defense Reserve Fleet there on the same day. She was struck from the Navy List on 23 June 1947. On 1 January 1969, she was redesignated LPA-233. She was sold for scrapping on 15 February 1980.

=== Decorations ===
Sevier received two battle stars for her World War II service.
