= Haskell-class attack transport =

US amphibious assault ship

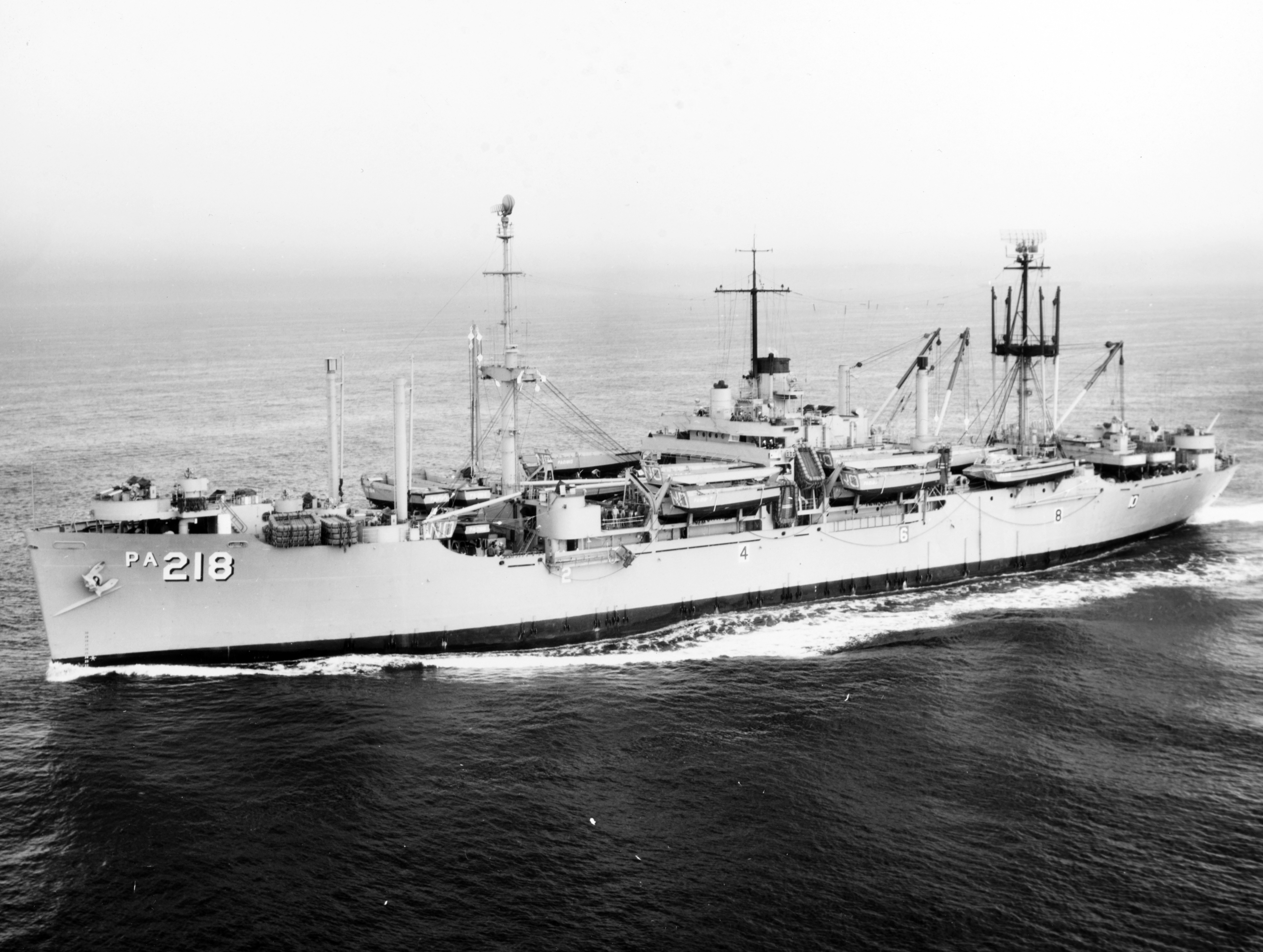
- USS Noble, a ship of the Haskell class, in 1956

Class overview
- Name: Haskell class
- Builders: California Shipbuilding; Oregon Shipbuilding; Permanente Metals; Kaiser Shipbuilding
- Preceded by: Gilliam class
- Succeeded by: Paul Revere class
- Built: 1944–1945
- In commission: 11 September 1944 – 29 October 1945
- Planned: 131
- Completed: 117
- Canceled: 14
- Lost: 0

General characteristics
- Type: Attack transport
- Displacement: 6,873 tons (lt), 14,837 t (fl)
- Length: 455 ft (139 m)
- Beam: 62 ft (19 m)
- Draft: 24 ft (7 m)
- Propulsion: 1 × geared turbine (Westinghouse, Joshua Hendy or Allis-Chalmers), 2 × header-type boilers (Babcock & Wilcox or Combustion Engineering), 1 × propeller, designed 8,500 shp (6,338 kW)
- Speed: 18–19 knots (33–35 km/h; 21–22 mph)
- Boats & landing craft carried: 2 × LCM; 12 × LCVP; 3 × LCPL
- Capacity: Troops: 86 officers, 1,475 enlisted; Cargo: 150,000 cu ft, 2,900 tons
- Complement: 56 officers, 480 enlisted
- Armament: 1 × 5"/38 dual-purpose gun; 4 × twin 40mm guns; 10 × single 20mm guns; late armament, add 1 × 40mm quad mount

Haskell-class attack transports (APAs) were amphibious assault ships of the United States Navy created in 1944. They were designed to transport 1,500 troops and their combat equipment and land them on hostile shores with the ships' integral landing craft.

The Haskell ships were very active in the World War II Pacific Theater of Operations, landing marines and soldiers and transporting casualties at Iwo Jima and Okinawa. Ships of the class were among the first Allied ships to enter Tokyo Bay at the end of World War II, landing the first occupation troops at Yokosuka. After the end of World War II, most participated in Operation Magic Carpet, the massive sealift of US personnel back to the United States. A few of the Haskell class were reactivated for the Korean War, with some staying in service into the Vietnam War.

The Haskell class, Maritime Commission standard type VC2-S-AP5, is a subtype of the World War II Victory ship design; 117 were launched in 1944 and 1945, with 14 more being finished as another VC2 type or canceled, built by the War Shipping Administration under the Emergency Shipbuilding program. The Haskell class was named for the so-named counties of Kansas, Oklahoma, and Texas.

== Design ==
The VC2-S-AP5 design was intended for the transport and assault landing of over 1,500 troops and their heavy combat equipment. During Operation Magic Carpet, up to 1,900 personnel per ship were carried homeward. (Note: See USS Rutland)

The Haskell ships carried 25 landing craft to deliver the troops and equipment right onto the beach. The 23 main boats were the 36-foot (11 m)-long LCVP, which was designed to carry 36 equipped troops. The other two landing craft were the 50-foot (15 m)-long LCM (3), capable of carrying 60 troops or 30 tons (27 t) of cargo, or the 56-foot (17 m) LCM (6). They also carried one gig.

The Haskell-class ships were armed with one 5"/38 caliber gun, 12 Bofors 40 mm L/60 guns (one quad mount, four dual mounts), and 10 Oerlikon 20 mm guns.

== Ships of the Haskell class ==
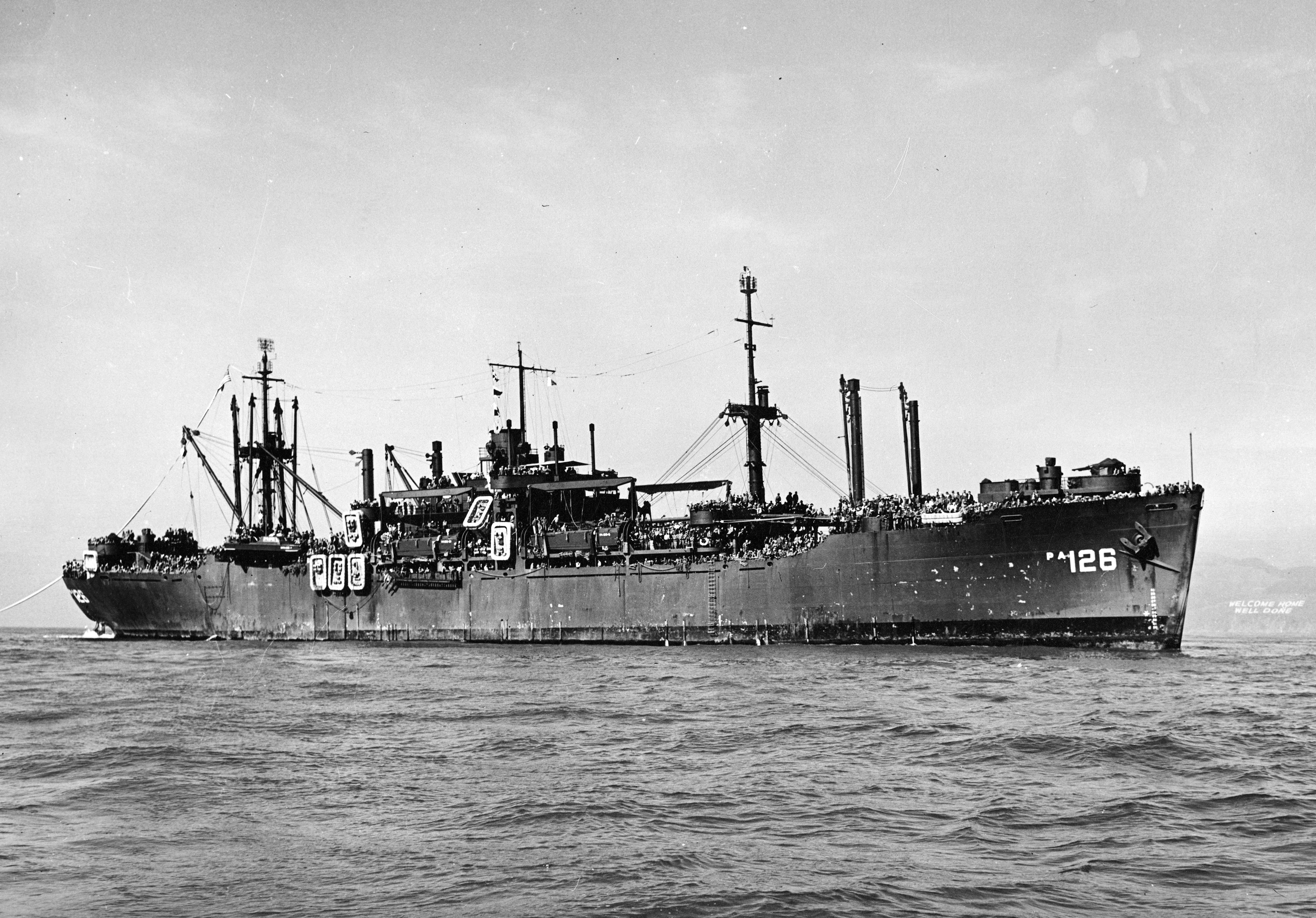
USS St. Mary's in San Francisco Bay, California, in late 1945 or early 1946: She is returning troops from the western Pacific to the United States as part of Operation Magic Carpet. Note the long homeward-bound pennant trailing from her after mast, and the sign on shore (in the right distance) stating "Welcome Home, Well Done"

Haskell-class attack transports included APA-117, USS Haskell, the lead ship, through APA-247, the never-completed USS Mecklenburg. The hulls for APA-181 through APA-186 were repurposed to be hospital ships before they were named. Ultimately, those hospital ships were built on larger C4 plan and the six VC2 hulls were built in a merchant configuration. APAs numbered 240 through 247 were named, but cancelled in 1945 when the war ended. With the special exception of USS Marvin H. McIntyre, the Haskell-class ships were all named after counties of the United States.

== Fate ==
Most of the Haskell-class ships were mothballed in 1946, with only a few remaining in service. Many of them were scrapped in 1973–75. A few were converted into Missile Range Instrumentation Ships.

- USS Gage, the last remaining ship in the Haskell configuration, was scrapped in 2009 at ESCO Marine, in Brownsville, Texas.
- USS Sherburne, which was converted and renamed USS Range Sentinel, lasted until she was scrapped in 2012.
- SS Rutland Victory was sold to a private company and sank on 13 February 1976, 600 miles east of Tokyo, Japan.

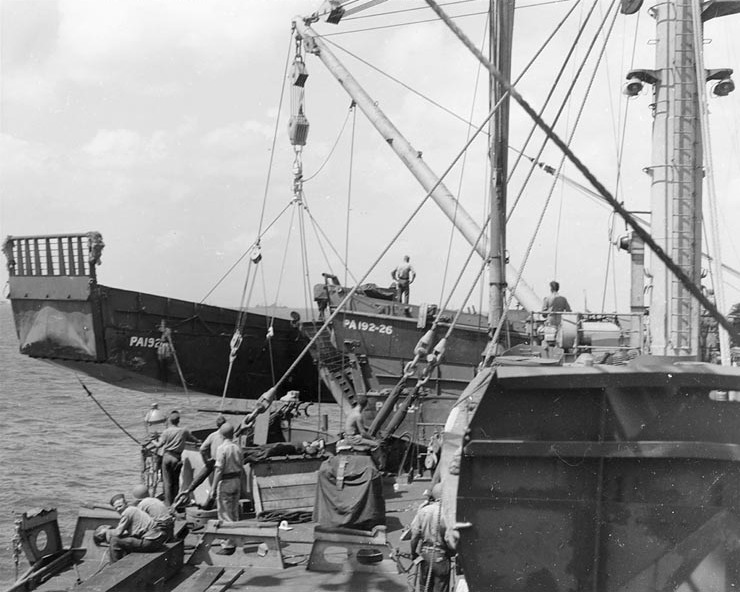
USS Rutland lowering an LCM off Iwo Jima in 1945

== Notable incidents ==
- USS Hinsdale (APA-120) had kamikaze attack damage on 1 April 1945 at Okinawa. Over 15 men were killed. The extensive engine room damage was later repaired.
- USS Telfair (APA-210) on 2 April 1945 was hit by kamikaze attack; the plane hit the side of the ship, then dropped into the sea. She was later repaired.
- USS La Grange (APA-124) on 13 August 1945 was damaged in last kamikaze attack of WWII; 21 sailors were killed with 89 wounded.
- USS Colbert (APA-145) had mine damage on 17 September 1945, off Okinawa; this caused the death of three men and damaged the ship extensively.

== In fiction ==
The 1956 movie Away All Boats presents operations on an attack transport. It was based on a popular novel of the same name, written by an officer who served on one during World War II.

The opening chapters of the novel Cinderella Liberty were set on the APA USS Begonia.

== See also ==
- Victory ship
- Gilliam-class attack transport
