= Itoh Emi 13 =

1920s Japanese biplane aircraft

Emi 13

General information
- Type: two seat trainer
- National origin: Japan
- Manufacturer: Itoh Aeroplane Research Studio
- Designer: Tomotari Inagaki
- Primary user: Itoh Flying School, Itoh Beach
- Number built: 2

History
- Introduction date: 1920
- First flight: c. May 1920
- Developed from: Itoh Emi 9

The Itoh Emi 13 was a two seat Japanese trainer, designed for the Itoh flying school and introduced in two versions in 1920 and 1921.

== Design and development ==
From mid-1919 Otojiro Itoh's flying school at Itoh Airfield at Tsudanuma had relied heavily on the Itoh Emi 9, its only two seat trainer. Its designer, Tomotari Inagaki, had already designed a similar but improved successor, powered by the same Hall-Scott V-8 engine. This, the Emi 13, was built between the summer of 1919 and the following spring.

The Emi 13 was a wooden-framed, fabric covered two bay biplane with pairs of parallel interplane struts. Its wings were rectangular in plan, with overhung ailerons only on the upper wing. Tall, outward-leaning cabane struts braced the wing over the fuselage, where there was a broad trailing edge cut-out to increase the field of view from the rear seat. The lower wings were mounted on the lower fuselage longeron.

Its V-8 engine was nose-mounted with its upper parts exposed and a flat, narrow, rectangular radiator attached vertically just behind it on the port side where the engine cowling joined a flat-sided fuselage. The two separate cockpits of the Emi 5 were replaced by tandem seats in a single open cockpit, with the student under the central wing and the tutor under the trailing edge. This change was made to ease communication between them. Behind them the fuselage had rounded upper decking. The tail was conventional, with the horizontal surfaces mounted on top of the fuselage and the tailplane strut-braced from below. The fin was small and triangular in profile but carried a large rounded rudder with a prominent horn balance.

The Emi 13 had a single axle undercarriage with large wheels. The axle was rubber-sprung on a cross-braced frame with forward legs and trailing drag struts to the lower fuselage longerons. Its tall tailskid was mounted below the tailplane leading edge.

== Operational history ==
To demonstrate its abilities the Emi 13 took part in a competition sponsored by the Imperial Flying Association held In August 1920 in Tokyo. It gained the fourth prizes for both speed, at 109 km/h (68 mph; 59 kn) and altitude 1,370 m (4,490 ft).

By late 1920 the Hall-Scott engine was reaching the end of its life so Inagaki revised the design to take a 90 hp (67 kW) Curtiss OX-5, another water-cooled V-8. Itoh completed this aircraft, referred to as the Emi 13 no.2, in 1921 and it became the principal trainer at the flying school.

== Variants ==
Emi 13 no.1
First example, Hall-Scott powered and flown in 1920.

Emi 13 no.2
Second example, Curtiss powered and flown in 1921.

== Specifications ==
Data from Japanese Aircraft 1910-1941 (Note: Mikesh and Shorzoe do not say which variant these figures apply to.)

General characteristics

- Crew: one tutor
- Capacity: one student
- Length: 6.40 m (21 ft 0 in)
- Wingspan: 10.37 m (34 ft 0 in)
- Height: 2.50 m (8 ft 2 in)
- Wing area: 29 m^{2} (310 sq ft)
- Empty weight: 450 kg (992 lb)
- Gross weight: 600 kg (1,323 lb)
- Propellers: 2-bladed wooden

Performance

- Maximum speed: 106 km/h (66 mph, 57 kn)
- Endurance: 2 hr
- Time to altitude: 7 min to1,000 m (3,300 ft)
