= Itoh Emi 9 =

1910s Japanese biplane aircraft

Emi 9

General information
- Type: two seat trainer aircraft
- National origin: Japan
- Manufacturer: Itoh Aeroplane Research Studio
- Designer: Tomotari Inagaki
- Number built: 1

History
- First flight: 1918-19

The Itoh Emi 9 was a two-seat Japanese training biplane built in 1918.

== Design and development ==
After the destruction of Itoh's hangar at Inage Beach by a tidal wave at the end of September 1917 his works and flying school moved to Tsudanuma Beach, otherwise known as Itoh Airfield. The move led a significant increase in student numbers and a new, two seat trainer was needed; until then they had relied on single-seaters. The solution was provided not by Itoh or his employees but by a regular visitor to the airfield, Tomotari Inagaki. He designed a simple and stable two seat trainer around the water-cooled 80 hp (60 kW) Hall-Scott V-8 engine taken from the Emi 3. It became known as the Itoh Emi 9.

The Emi 9, typical of its time, had a wooden frame and fabric covering. It was a straightforward two bay biplane, with two parallel pairs of interplane struts on each side. The wings were rectangular in plan and manufacture was further simplified by the absence of dihedral or stagger.

Its upright V-8 engine was installed in the nose with most of the upper part exposed and its rectangular radiator mounted edge-on just behind the engine on the fuselage port side. Pupil and instructor had separate open cockpits in a fuselage rather similar to that of the Emi 5 and its forebear the Curtiss Jenny. Its tail was also similar to the Jenny's, with a triangular fin, a rudder with a straight leading edge which continued that of the fin and a deep, rounded trailing edge, though the control surfaces had horn balances, the first to be used on a Japanese civil aircraft.

The Emi 9 had a simple, single axle undercarriage with legs on the lower fuselage longerons and trailing drag struts to the fuselage centre line.

== Operational history ==
The Emi 9 served the Itoh school as intended, though details of its history are lacking.

== Specifications ==
Data from Japanese Aircraft 1910-1941

General characteristics

- Crew: one instructor
- Capacity: one student
- Length: 7.45 m (24 ft 5 in)
- Wingspan: 9.80 m (32 ft 2 in)
- Height: 2.30 m (7 ft 7 in)
- Empty weight: 350 kg (772 lb)
- Powerplant: 1 × Hall-Scott water-cooled V-8, 60 kW (80 hp)
- Propellers: 2-bladed

Performance

- Maximum speed: 111 km/h (69 mph, 60 kn)
