= Gar Wood Speedster =

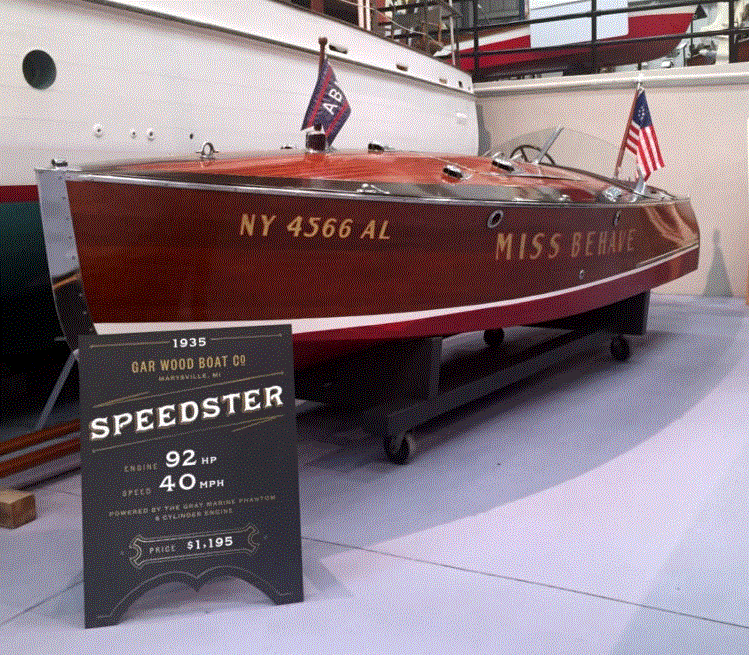
- The Gar Wood Speedster Miss Behave at the Antique Boat Museum in Clayton, New York

History

United States
- Name: Gar Wood Speedster
- Builder: Garfield Wood – Gar Wood Industries; Marysville, Michigan; Designer: Joseph Napoleon "Nap" Lisee (Master Boat Designer, Algonac Plant) and George Joachim (Sr. Foreman, Marysville Plant)
- Cost: US$1,195–2,045
- Launched: 1934

General characteristics
- Type: Racing boat
- Displacement: 1 ton
- Length: 16 ft (4.9 m)
- Beam: 5.4 ft (1.6 m)
- Draught: 1.4 ft (0.43 m)
- Installed power: 1 × 92 hp (69 kW) up to 175 hp (130 kW)
- Propulsion: Single flat head six cylinder engines
- Speed: 40 mph (35 kn; 64 km/h) up to 55 mph (48 kn; 89 km/h)
- Crew: 2

The Gar Wood Speedster is a model of 16 ft racing boat produced and offered from 1934 to 1938 by Garfield Wood under the "Gar Wood" brand, and powered with various single six-cylinder flathead marine engines. Of the fourteen original Speedsters, three have been widely researched due to their famous owners – "Miss Behave" and "Miss Chief" from 1935, and "Miss Persia" from 1936. Today, more reproduction Speedsters than original boats exist worldwide, with reproductions starting as early as the 1960s.

== Design and construction ==
The Speedster is next to the much larger Baby Gar model from the 1920s as the most well-known and sought-after boat model of the Gar Wood brand, yet it was only produced fourteen times in its production period and was the smallest racing boat built before World War II by Gar Wood. It was using the standard 16 ft runabout as a base, which was introduced one year earlier in 1933. The Speedster was Gar Wood's maritime version of the European sports cars, which in the early and mid 1930s raised considerable attention in the United States. At the same time, the Speedster was seen by many as the smaller version of Gar Wood's famous Miss Americas, his large racing boats packed with several Miller V-16 or Packard V-12 engines, with which he captured six times the world's water speed record and won several times the prestigious Gold Cup and the famous Harmsworth Trophy.

The Speedster was made of African mahogany and was a single, aft cockpit racer, powered by various six-cylinder engines during its production period. In its first year of production, the Speedster was offered at a price of US$1,195 (thus, more than double the price of e.g. a standard Ford V8 at that time), fitted with a standard Chrysler engine. In its final year of production, the entry price of a Speedster increased to US$1,565 and US$2,045 for the Racing Speedster model, the latter featuring a canvas deck, a two blade propeller and fitted with the largest engine (a 175 hp Gray Fire Ball) available. In most of the fourteen original Speedsters, a six-cylinder Gray marine engine was installed, yet other engine options were available with Chrysler Crown, Gray Marine 244, Gray Fire Ball and Lycoming 223, bringing it to a maximum speed of about 45 mph (39 kn; 72 km/h).

As an option in the first two years, it was possible to equip the Speedster also with a 225 Scripps V-8, but none of the original Speedsters were ever equipped with an eight-cylinder engine directly at the factory. Fitting a 225 cubic inch engine into the Speedster was though important and also used by Gar Wood for marketing purposes (here, promising a top speed with the V-8 engine of up to 55 mph (48 kn; 89 km/h), as in October 1934 the new 225 racing class was established by the American Power Boat Association, for which the Gar Wood Speedster could now be entered. Today, the special design of this boat with aft seating is commonly known as a Gentleman's runabout or racer.

== History ==
Before the original Gar Wood factory records were rediscovered in the mid-1990s, it was assumed and widely published (among others in the Rusty Rudder Journal and Classic Boating's 1991 issue) that Edward J. Noble, president of the Lifesaver Candy company, was the customer who persuaded Garfield Wood to produce a small fleet of racing boats for himself and his friends to run on the St. Lawrence river. Hence, even today, many different authorities and various media source from this first research idea established in early 1991. Yet, although this theory was considerably conceivable, it could never be assured and based on the old factory records, the same researchers (Anthony Mollica and Bill Northup) corrected their findings accordingly: It was more likely that the customers, who influenced Gar Wood in building the Speedster, were the Bourne and Thayer families of the Thousand Islands instead, buying three of the fourteen produced original Speedsters in 1935. Although Edward J. Noble did own a Baby Gar model, he never in fact owned a Gar Wood Speedster, though his daughter, Mrs June Noble Larkin, did. Thus, despite Gar Wood boats were highly prestigious (a Gar Wood boat had a price mark-up of about 1.5 to 2.5 over a comparable Chris-Craft model of same size) and the brand even used their famous customers since the 1920s as a reference in their advertizing, the only famous person known to have owned a Gar Wood Speedster as its very first owner was Mohammad Reza Pahlavi.

Based on the factory production records, the first model ever produced was the prototype used by Phil Wood, Garfield Wood's brother in late July, 1934. It was powered with an 85 hp Chrysler Marine engine and it still exists today. This was the boat that was used by Gar Wood for all of its sales material (showing reporter Charles Lussier and Gar Wood's Plant Manager Ed Hancock on board) and the first public appearance in a Motor Boating article in October 1934. Another eight boats, including "Miss Behave" and "Miss Chief", were produced in 1935. One of these was sold to Algiers (powered with a 92 hp Chrysler) and one to Paris. Except the Algiers boat, all of these were powered with a 115 hp Gray Marine engine. Another single Speedster was produced in 1936 and delivered to Paris and onwards via Switzerland to Persia. Another four Speedsters were produced but not sold until 1939 (one Speedster, which sold to Detroit) and 1941 (two sold to Ohio, one to Kentucky). One of these four boats was powered with a 165 hp Lycoming engine, which was the largest, factory-installed engine ever fitted into an original Speedster.

Of the fourteen original Speedsters, only seven are known to have survived. Of all Speedsters built, most known and researched is the history of the following Speedsters:

=== Miss Behave ===
In 1935, Miss Behave was one of four Speedsters originally delivered to Fitzgerald & Lee, Gar Wood's highest volume dealer before WWII, based in Alexandria Bay. Miss Behave, then called in fact "Miss Step", was purchased by the Bourne and Thayer families together with Miss Me and Miss Chief and it is today exhibited at the Antique Boat Museum in Clayton, New York. Miss Behave was originally powered with a 115 hp six cylinder flat head Gray marine engine, owned first by George Bourne, fourth son of Frederick Gilbert Bourne, based on Dark Island. It is one of the few original survivors, donated to the museum by Mrs. June Noble Larkin. Mrs. Noble Larkin, daughter of Edward J. Noble, bought the boat before 1968 together with her first husband, David Shiverick Smith, from its second owner (who also changed the name from Miss Step to Miss Behave) Fred McNally, and kept the boat after the divorce in 1968, when she got remarried to Frank Yoakum Larkin. Most of the reproduction speedsters built today are based on the original drawings of Miss Behave, taken during her restoration by the Turcotte Brothers in the early 1990s. Miss Behave's sister boat, "Miss Me", was owned by Alfred Severin Bourne, third son of Frederick Gilbert Bourne with its fate currently still uncertain.

=== Miss Chief ===
Another original 1935 Speedster from the Fitzgerald & Lee delivery was Miss Chief, originally purchased by Alexander Dallas Thayer, who was married to Marjorie Bourne and hence he was son-in-law to Frederick Gilbert Bourne. Featuring hull number 5703, Miss Chief is next to Miss Persia one of the five original Speedsters currently listed with the ACBS. It was originally powered with a 115 hp six cylinder Gray Marine engine, yet features today a 150 hp six cylinder Chrysler Spitfire engine. Miss Chief switched owners many times during its history: After A.D. Thayer, a second, unknown owner sold the boat to Randy Arnot, then to Bill Banister (when it got renamed to "Bandito"), further on to Don Price (renaming it to "Miss Chief"), on to Bob Fergus in the mid-1990s. Fergus sold the boat onwards to country-singer and classic boat collector Alan Jackson and it was later sold at the Antique Boat Auction in Clayton, NY, on August 1, 2009, for US$112,000 to its current owner, who replaced the bottom and preserved it back to its original looks of 1935. Miss Chief is currently the only Speedster that has a "twin", i.e. another Speedster with exactly the same name - other than that, the differences between these two twins are considerably high: The second Speedster called Miss Chief is a Wellington reproduction Speedster built in 1983 with a green fiberglass hull and green interior compared to the red, wooden hull and red interior of the original Miss Chief.

=== Miss Persia ===
In 1936, only one Speedster was likely produced for the important Spring exhibition at the Chicago Boat Show in May that year, where the Speedster model was shown for the last time at a Gar Wood fair stand due to decreasing interest by the Gar Wood dealers in the proceeding years. A few weeks later, on June 24, 1936, it was transported to New York Harbor, sailing eastbound on July 1 on board the SS Normandie to Garfield Wood's French distributor Theobald M. Quinn to Paris. From here, it was delivered onwards to the Swiss Gar Wood distributor André Couteau. This boat (model 606) was purchased by Reza Shah as a present for his son Mohammad Reza Pahlavi, who studied at Lake Geneva in Switzerland until May 1936. Originally, this model was powered with a six-cylinder 125 hp Gray marine engine and, thus, was the original Speedster with the second-largest engine ever built. It was re-powered in 1947 with a seldom six-cylinder 1M-245 R Packard Marine racing engine, which was used by Mohammad Reza likely until 1950, at that time being part of the Ramsar Palace inventory, located at the Caspian Sea, the summer residence of the royal family. Its remains were rediscovered in 2016 and since, its hundred percent factory-correct recreation named "Miss Persia" is well documented and today part of a German collection, again powered with its rare six-cylinder Packard Marine racing engine.

Further, to the very detailed history of the above original Speedsters, the following two original Speedsters have been with their long-time owners for decades according to the records of the ACBS:

=== Nostalgia ===
Nostalgia was one of the 1935 boats, delivered to the Bennett Boat Company in Mayfield, NY, then running on Great Sacandaga Lake. Today, it is located in Northern California.

=== Dream Chaser ===
Dream Chaser (previously known as Prima Donna) is Phil Wood's 1934 prototype, hence the oldest Speedster ever built with hull number 5589, featuring today a Gray Phantom Marine six cylinder engine with 115 hp. After the Chicago Boat Show in 1935 it was shipped to its new owner in Windsor, Ontario (Canada). After many years in one single collector hand, it is now owned by a GarWood collector from Georgia and resides on Lake Rabun.

== Reproduction Speedsters ==
Several companies and individuals based in the US and abroad produced exact copies of the Gar Wood Speedster. Commonly known as reproduction companies are the three Miss Behave Inc. Speedsters built by Rogers Marina in Alexandria Bay in 1963, fifteen Wellington versions in the 1980s built in Wilson, NY, and the six 16 ft replicas of the Turcotte Brothers based in Watervliet, NY, during the 1990s.

Main differences between the above three small reproduction series can be found in the quality of reproduction, the engines installed and the original Speedster that served as a base: While both the Miss Behave Inc. and Turcotte Brothers' Speedsters were based on the original Miss Behave, the Wellington versions were based on Nostalgia. Further, while the three Miss Behave Inc. Speedsters used general available hardware, the Turcotte and Wellington versions used both exact copies of the original Speedsters' hardware. Also, the Wellington versions were all featuring a fiberglass bottom, sides and transom, marking the biggest difference to the original Speedsters. Finally, the craftsmen behind Miss Behave Inc., David Rogers Sr. and Jr., chose to equip all three Speedsters with a 188 hp Universal "Little King" V-8 engine supplied by Universal Motor Company based in Oskosh, Wis. Contrastingly, the Wellington Speedsters featured a Crusader Marine V-6 engine with 165 hp only, while four Turcotte Speedsters were delivered with V-6 and two more with V-8 marine engines.

=== Miss Conduct ===
Another fine example of an individual reproduction speedster was Alan Schinnerer's "Miss Conduct" rebuilt between 1983 and 1985, which according to its hull number 5496 was based on an original Gar Wood 16 ft split-cockpit runabout of the same year. It is powered by a 244-cubic-inch Chrysler Fire Ball six-cylinder flathead engine, producing 175 hp and achieving a top speed of 55 mph (48 kn; 89 km/h). In the late 1980s, this boat won best of show prizes at the most prestigious boat shows in the US and thus can be seen as one of the best reproduction speedsters ever built. At an estimate of US$30,000–40,000, it finally sold to its new owner at a price of US$70,400 at an RM Sotheby's auction in 2015.

=== Miss Demeanor ===
Further, a few individuals around the world built replicas based on the drawings which were taken from Miss Behave during the restoration process. One of the most featured examples is the Swedish reproduction Speedster "Miss Demeanor", which was built in a home garage over a period of nearly two years between 2010 and 2012. Miss Demeanor is powered with a 220 hp Chevrolet V-6 engine, reaching about 40kn, and its private reproduction shows the fascination and impact the Gar Wood Speedster expresses even after more than 80 years on people worldwide.

Today, more reproduction Speedsters are existing than original Speedsters with a total of sixteen 16 ft Gar Wood Speedsters registered at the Antique and Classic Boat Society, consisting of 4 Wellington Speedsters, 2 Turcotte replicas, 5 Speedsters of unknown origin and 5 original Speedsters with unique, confirmed hull numbers (September 2018). Overall, it has been researched that just about thirty 16 ft Gar Wood Speedsters exist worldwide (September 2018).

== See also ==
- Garfield Wood
