= Engineering Division TW-1 =

TW-1
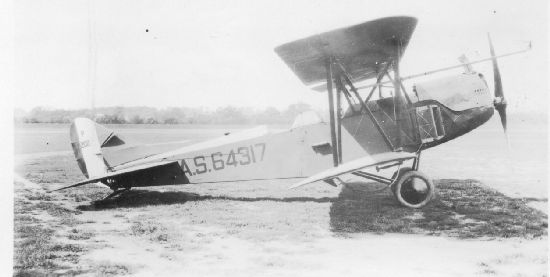

General information
- Type: Training biplane
- National origin: United States
- Manufacturer: Engineering Division
- Primary user: United States Army Air Service
- Number built: 2

History
- First flight: 1920

The Engineering Division TW-1 was an American two-seat training biplane designed by the United States Army Engineering Division, only two were built and the type did not enter production.

== Design and development ==
Two prototypes of the TW-1 were built powered by a 230 hp (172 kW) Liberty 6. The second aircraft was tested at McCook Field, (given the McCook designation P-200) and subsequently modified with a 350 hp (261 kW) Packard 1A-1237 engine but no others were built.

== Specifications ==
Data from aerofiles.com

General characteristics

- Crew: 2
- Length: 28 ft 10 in (8.79 m)
- Wingspan: 41 ft 0 in (12.5 m)
- Powerplant: 1 × Liberty 6 , 230 hp (172 kW)

== See also ==
Related lists

- List of military aircraft of the United States
