= Liberty L-4 =

Experimental US aircraft engine

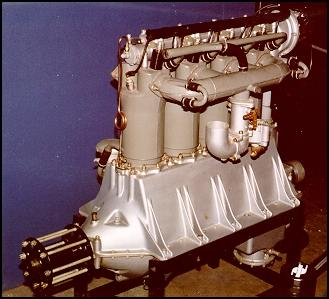
- Liberty L-4 aircraft engine
- Type: Piston aero engine
- National origin: United States
- Manufacturer: Hudson Motor Car Company
- Designer: Jesse G. Vincent and Elbert J. Hall
- First run: 1917
- Number built: 2
- Variants: Liberty L-6, Liberty L-8, Liberty L-12

The Liberty L-4B was an experimental water-cooled inline four-cylinder aircraft engine developed in the United States during World War I. The 102 hp (76 kW) engine was designed and manufactured by the Hudson Motor Car Company and was mainly intended for use in training airplanes. Only two examples of the L-4B were produced, since other types of engines were available and in production. While the engine was ground-tested, it is unknown if the L-4 was ever test-flown. The L-4 was created as part of a US aircraft engine development effort which also created the six-cylinder Liberty L-6, eight-cylinder Liberty L-8 and twelve-cylinder Liberty L-12.

== Specifications ==
=== General characteristics ===
- Type: Four-cylinder inline piston engine
- Bore: 5 in. (127mm)
- Stroke: 7 in. (177.8mm)
- Displacement: 549.8 cuin (9.0 L)

=== Components ===
- Cooling system: Water-cooled

=== Performance ===
- Power output: 102 hp (76 kW)

== See also ==
Related lists

- List of aircraft engines
