= Garfield Wood =

American inventor and professional motorboat racer (1880–1971)

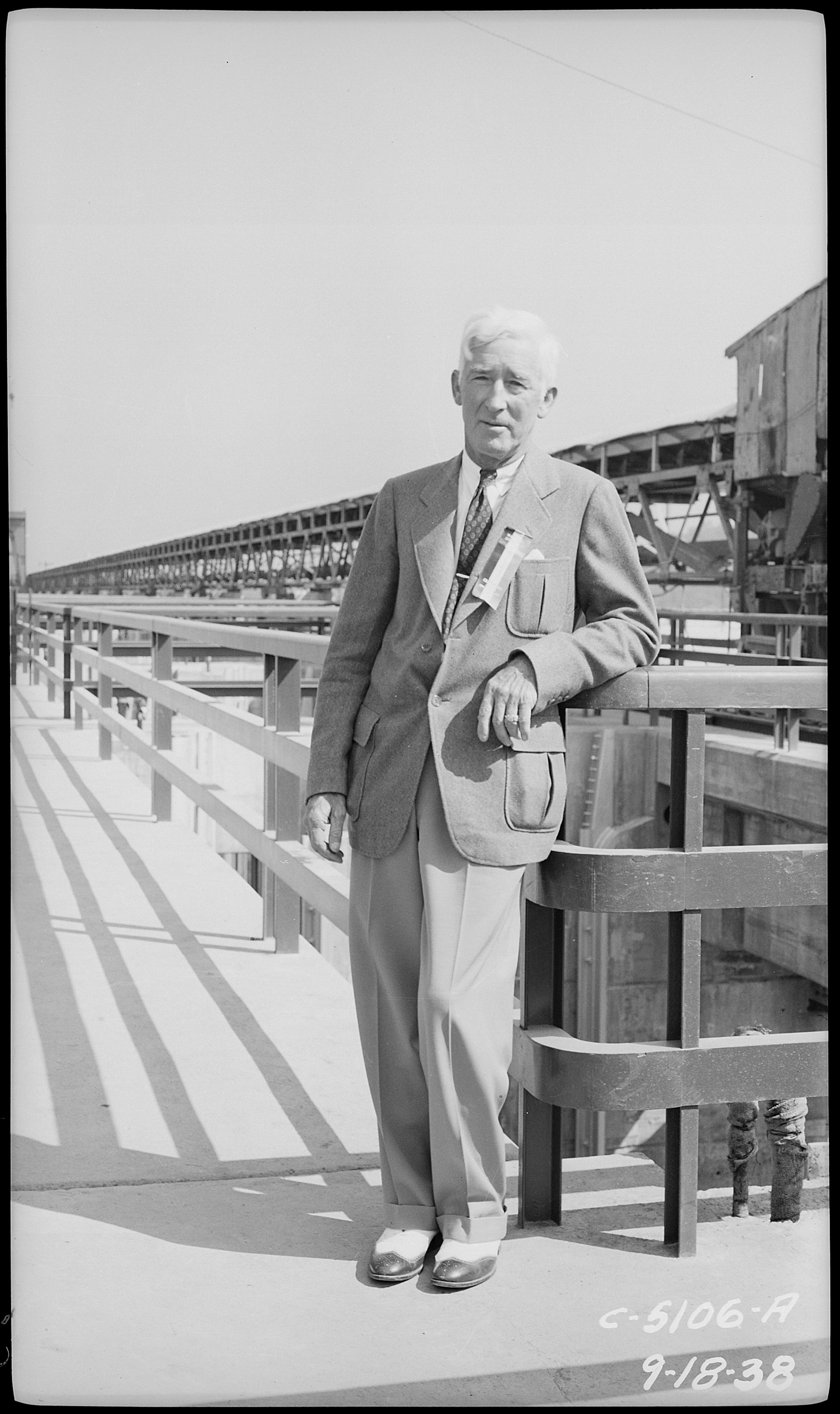
Garfield Wood in 1938

Garfield Arthur "Gar" Wood (December 4, 1880 – June 19, 1971) was an American inventor, entrepreneur, and championship motorboat builder and racer who held the world water speed record on several occasions. He was the first man to travel over 100 miles per hour (160 km/h) on water.

== Early life ==
Gar Wood was born on December 4, 1880, in Mapleton, Iowa, into a family of 13 children. His father was a ferryboat operator on Lake Osakis, Minnesota, and Gar worked on boats from an early age.

== Garwood Industries ==
In 1911, at the age of 31, Wood invented a hydraulic lift for unloading coal from rail trucks.

Wood established the Wood Hoist Co. in Detroit, Michigan, and soon became a successful businessman. Later, he changed the company's name to Garwood Industries, which built racing and pleasure boats under the Gar Wood brand. Wood also capitalized on experience with coal unloaders to successfully produce and market GarWood truck, bus and coach bodies. He had a home in Algonac, Michigan.

Garwood Industries also built truck bodies, tractor attachments and winches that were used by truck and tractor manufacturers such as Allis-Chalmers, International Harvester, and were an OEM supplier to both the civilian and military market. Many trucks built during World War II came equipped with Garwood bodies and winches. Garwood Industries also developed a garbage truck with a compactor, originally sold as the Garwood Load Packer.

== Racing career ==
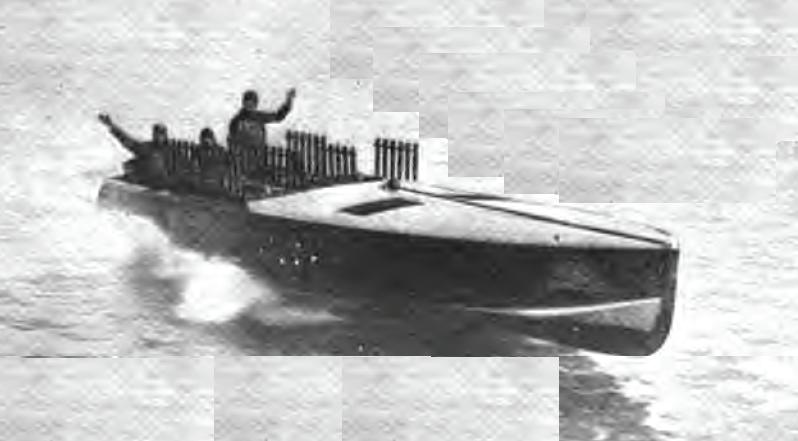
Miss America 2, a triple Liberty V-12-powered 1921 Harmsworth Trophy winner, and second of nine Miss Americas built for Wood

In 1916, Wood purchased a motorboat for racing called Miss Detroit. He also bought the company that made it, run by brothers Chris and Henry Smith (who would later found Chris-Craft in 1924). This led to the construction of Gar Wood brand watercraft.

Initially still focused on racing, Wood set a new water speed record of 75 miles per hour (121 km/h) in 1920 on the Detroit River, using a new twin Liberty V-12 powered boat called Miss America. In the following twelve years, Wood built nine more Miss Americas and broke the record five times, raising it to 125 miles per hour (201 km/h) in 1932 on Michigan’s St. Clair River.

In 1921, Wood raced one of his boats against the Havana Special train, 1,250 miles (2,010 km) up the Atlantic coast from Miami to New York City. Wood made the trip in 47 hours and 23 minutes and beat the train by 12 minutes. In 1925, he raced the 20th Century Limited train up the Hudson River between Albany and New York and won by 22 minutes.

As well as being a record breaker and showman, Wood won five straight powerboat Gold Cup races between 1917 and 1921. Wood also won the prestigious Harmsworth Trophy nine times (1920–21, 1926, 1928–30, 1932–33).

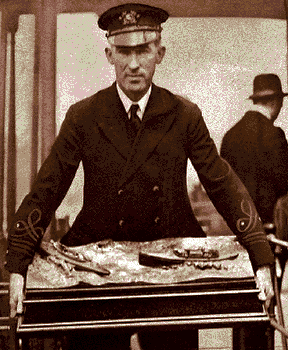
Gar Wood returns the Harmsworth Trophy to the United States in 1920

In 1931, he lost the Trophy in dramatic circumstances to his younger brother George. The race was held on the Detroit River and was billed as a match race between the Wood brothers and racing driver and record-breaker Kaye Don, driving Miss England II. Before an estimated crowd of over a million spectators (one of the largest-ever crowds for a sporting event), Don won the first heat of the race. In the second heat, Wood was leading Don, when Miss England II suddenly flipped over while rounding one of the turns, without injury to Don and his co-driver. Gar Wood finished the race first, but both he and Don were disqualified because they had jumped the starter's gun by seven seconds. George Wood completed the final race to win the trophy. Wood retired from racing in 1933 to concentrate on his businesses.

In April 1936, Wood, along with many other sports champions and stand outs, was honored at a banquet in Detroit, Michigan. This banquet was the first celebration of Champions Day.

In July 1936, a plaque was presented to Detroit from the White House honoring Detroit as the City of Champions. The plaque has five "medallions" featuring athletes. One of these medallions is of a power boat racer, representing Wood.

== Gar Wood boats ==
Garwood Industries began building boats under the "Gar Wood" brand following his early successes in racing. The most famous were the Liberty V-12-powered 33-foot "Baby Gar" gentleman’s racer built in the 1920s and early 1930s. Along with numerous models of runabouts (variously available as sedans, landaus, and limousines), a 28-foot "Baby Gar", a 25-foot triple-cockpit runabout, and 40-foot commuter, a limited number of the 16-foot Gar Wood Speedsters were built from 1934 to 1938. Starting in 1935 a 20-foot utility and 26-foot family cruiser were made, followed by an 18-foot utility and 36-foot express cruiser in 1936.

During World War II, Garwood Industries produced a limited number of tugboats and target craft for the U.S. Navy. After the war, new technologies such as plywood, fiberglass, and mass production methods entered the pleasure boating world. The company continued to build its traditional all-wood boats until 1947, when it ended production.

== Inventions ==
Wood was known as an inventive genius who, at one point, held more US patents than any other living American.

In 1897, at the age of 17, Wood invented a downdraft carburetor which enabled his inspection boat to outrace the other inspectors.

In 1911 or 1912, Wood invented the profitable hydraulic hoist for dump trucks. He used the money it earned to build racing boats which won many championships between 1917 and 1933.

At one point, Wood had a job selling lightning rods to farmers, and to demonstrate their effectiveness he invented an induction coil device to mimic lightning.

== Retirement and later years ==
In the 1950s, Wood acquired Fisher Island in South Florida's Biscayne Bay, the last of a series of millionaires to occupy it as a one-family island retreat. He sold it to a development group in 1963. Wood also had a summer retreat in McGregor Bay, Ontario.

A 1967 Popular Mechanics article showed even in retirement Wood was still active inventing an Electric Vehicle (EV) controller, which he used in the EV he built.

Wood died in Miami 16 Jun 1971, at age 90 and days before the 50th anniversary of his first Harmsworth win. Upon his death, George Van of The Detroit News wrote: "To the public, he was Tom Swift, Jules Verne, Frank Merriwell with a little bit of Horatio Alger thrown in." Wood was buried near his home in Algonac, Michigan.

== Award ==
Wood was inducted in the Motorsports Hall of Fame of America in 1990.

== See also ==
- Jesse G. Vincent
- Gar Wood Speedster
- Sverige S-1, a Swedish wooden speedboat designed in 1929 (and built in 2011) to challenge the Miss America speed record.
