= Liberty L-6 =

Six-cylinder water-cooled inline aircraft engine

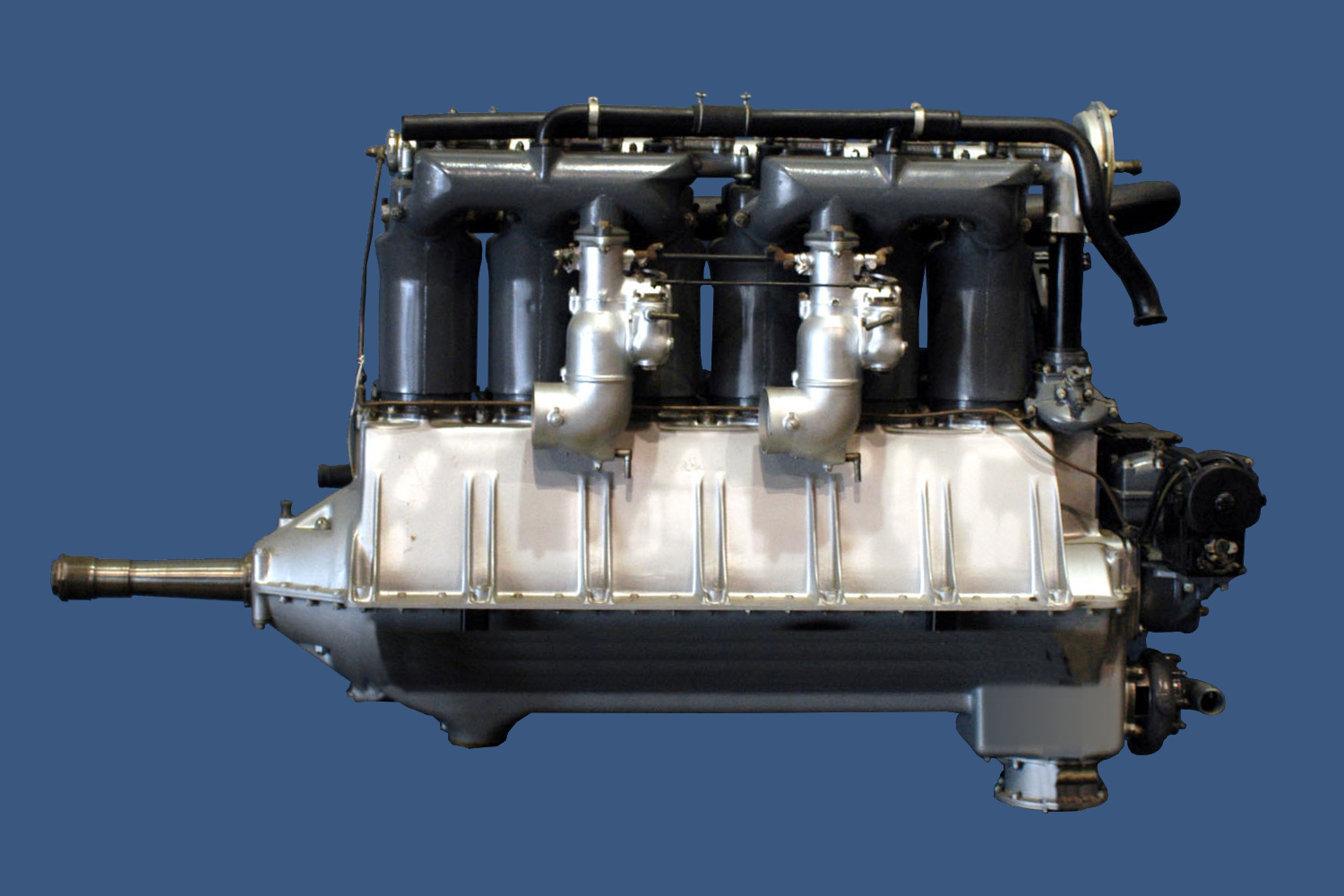
- Liberty L-6 aircraft engine on display at the National Museum of the United States Air Force
- Type: Piston aero engine
- National origin: United States
- Manufacturer: Wright Aeronautical, Thomas-Morse Aircraft
- First run: about 1917
- Major applications: Engineering Division TW-1
- Number built: 52
- Variants: Liberty L-4, Liberty L-8, Liberty L-12

The Liberty L-6 was a six-cylinder water-cooled inline aircraft engine developed in the United States during World War I.

== Design and development ==
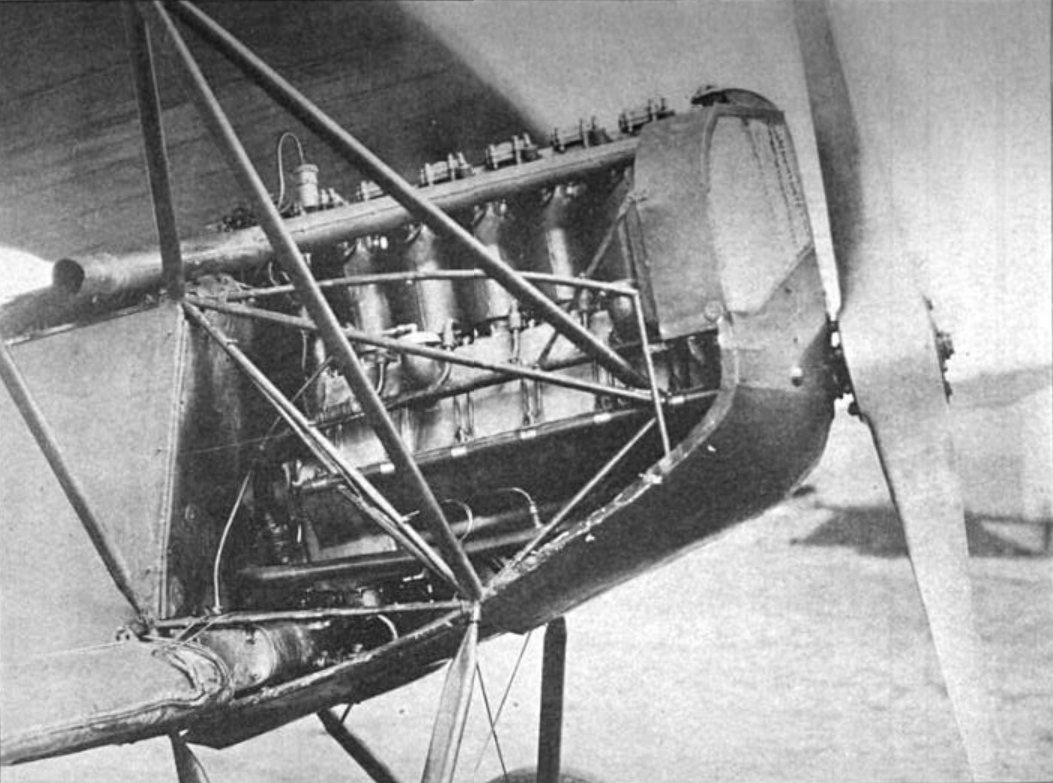
Fokker D.VII with Liberty L-6 engine fitted for trials

The Liberty L-6, which developed 200–215 hp, was built by the Thomas-Morse Aircraft Corp. and Wright Aeronautical Corp. Since it was based on the same engine design as the more successful Liberty L-12 V-12 liquid-cooled aviation engine, the L-6's resemblance to the Mercedes D.III German aviation engine, the source for the Liberty V-12's own cylinder and valvetrain design, resulted in the American L-6 engine design bearing a close visual resemblance to the German straight-six aviation powerplant in a number of respects, with at least one L-6 even being mounted postwar into a captured Fokker D.VII fighter for testing in the US. The Liberty L-6's smaller displacement of some 825 cu. in. (13.5 liters) versus the late-war German Mercedes D.IIIaü's 903 cubic inches (14.8 liters) does not seem to have handicapped the American straight-six design, however, as the "Liberty Six" possessed a 5.42:1 CR, while the D.IIIaü had only a 4.64:1 CR, explaining a good bit of the American powerplant's output level—in addition to the 735.5 watt level for German Pferdestärke metric horsepower, versus the then solely-American-based SAE organization's standard of almost 746 watts per one horsepower.

Since the L-6 was too large for mail airplanes and other engines were available, the L-6 was canceled after only 52 had been built. In 1920 10 more L-6 engines were ordered, designated L-825, several of which were installed in the Curtiss PN-1, (only two built), and the Engineering Division TW-1, (only six built).

Hall-Scott also produced a six-cylinder engine using Liberty L-12 components, as the Hall-Scott L-6.

== Specifications ==
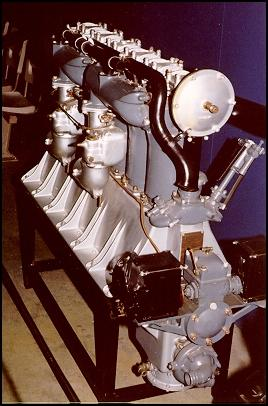
Rear view of restored Liberty Six engine

Data from U.S. Army Air Service Information Circular – Performance Test of Fokker D-VII with Liberty Six Engine

=== General characteristics ===
- Type: Six-cylinder inline piston engine
- Bore: 5.00 in (127 mm)
- Stroke: 7.00 in (177.8 mm)
- Displacement: 824.67 cu in (13.5 L)
- Dry weight: 567.5 lb (257.4 kg)

=== Components ===
- Valvetrain: SOHC (Single overhead cam)
- Fuel system: Twin updraft Stromberg N.A.-S5 carburetors
- Cooling system: Water-cooled

=== Performance ===
- Power output: 215 hp (160 kW) at 1,700 rpm
- Compression ratio: 5.42:1
- Fuel consumption: 0.49 lb/HP-hour
- Oil consumption: 0.0256 lb/HP-hour

== See also ==
Comparable engines

- Austro-Daimler 6
- BMW III
- Hiero 6
- Mercedes D.III
- SPA 6A

Related lists

- List of aircraft engines
