= Liberty L-8 =

Prototype of the Liberty L-12 engine

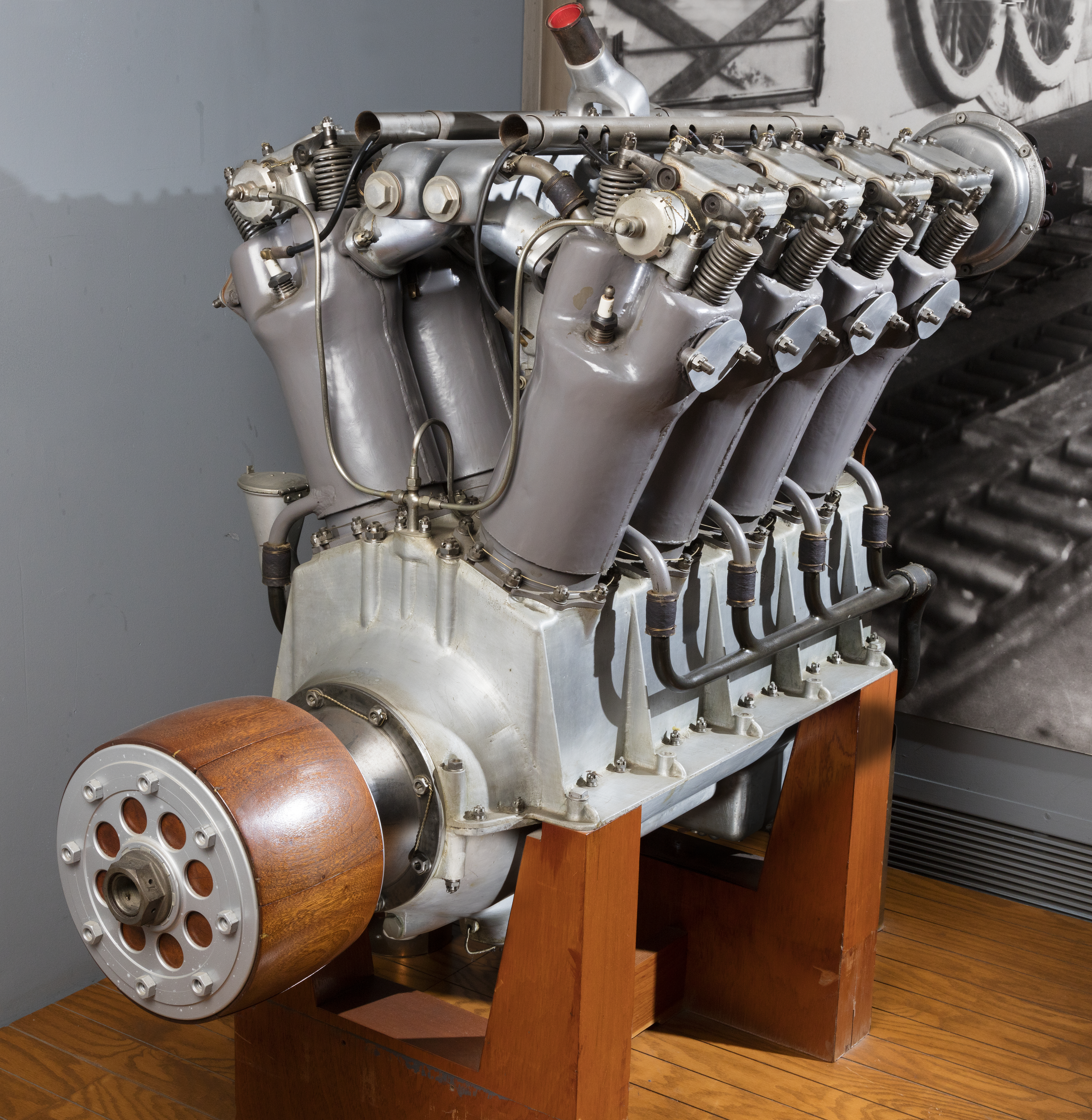
- First ever Liberty L-8 aircraft engine, on display at the National Air and Space Museum
- Type: Piston aircraft engine
- National origin: United States
- Manufacturer: Packard
- First run: c. 1917
- Variants: Liberty L-4, Liberty L-6, Liberty L-12

The Liberty L-8 (also known as the Packard 1A-1100) was a prototype of the Liberty L-12 engine designed by Jesse Vincent and Elbert Hall. Fifteen L-8 prototypes were manufactured by several companies including Buick, Ford, Lincoln, Marmon, and Packard in 1917. The first of those built now resides in the National Air and Space Museum in Washington, D.C., while the fifteenth L-8 (the only running example) powers Liberty the Second housed by the Conneaut Lake Historical Society in Conneaut Lake, PA. Another L-8 is stored at the National Museum of the U.S. Air Force in Dayton, OH.

== Specifications (Liberty L-8) ==
Data from National Air and Space Museum,

=== General characteristics ===
- Type: Liquid-cooled V8 aircraft piston engine
- Bore: 5 in (127 mm)
- Stroke: 7 in (178 mm)
- Displacement: 1,099.6 cubic inches (18.0 L)
- Length: 57 inches (1,448 mm)
- Dry weight: 575 pounds (260.8 kg)

=== Components ===
- Valvetrain: One intake and one exhaust valve per cylinder, actuated via a single overhead camshaft per cylinder bank.
- Cooling system: Liquid-cooled

=== Performance ===
- Power output: 290 hp (216 kW) at 1,700 rpm
- Specific power: 0.26 hp/in³ (11.9 kW/L)
- Power-to-weight ratio: 0.45 hp/lb (0.74 kW/kg)

== See also ==
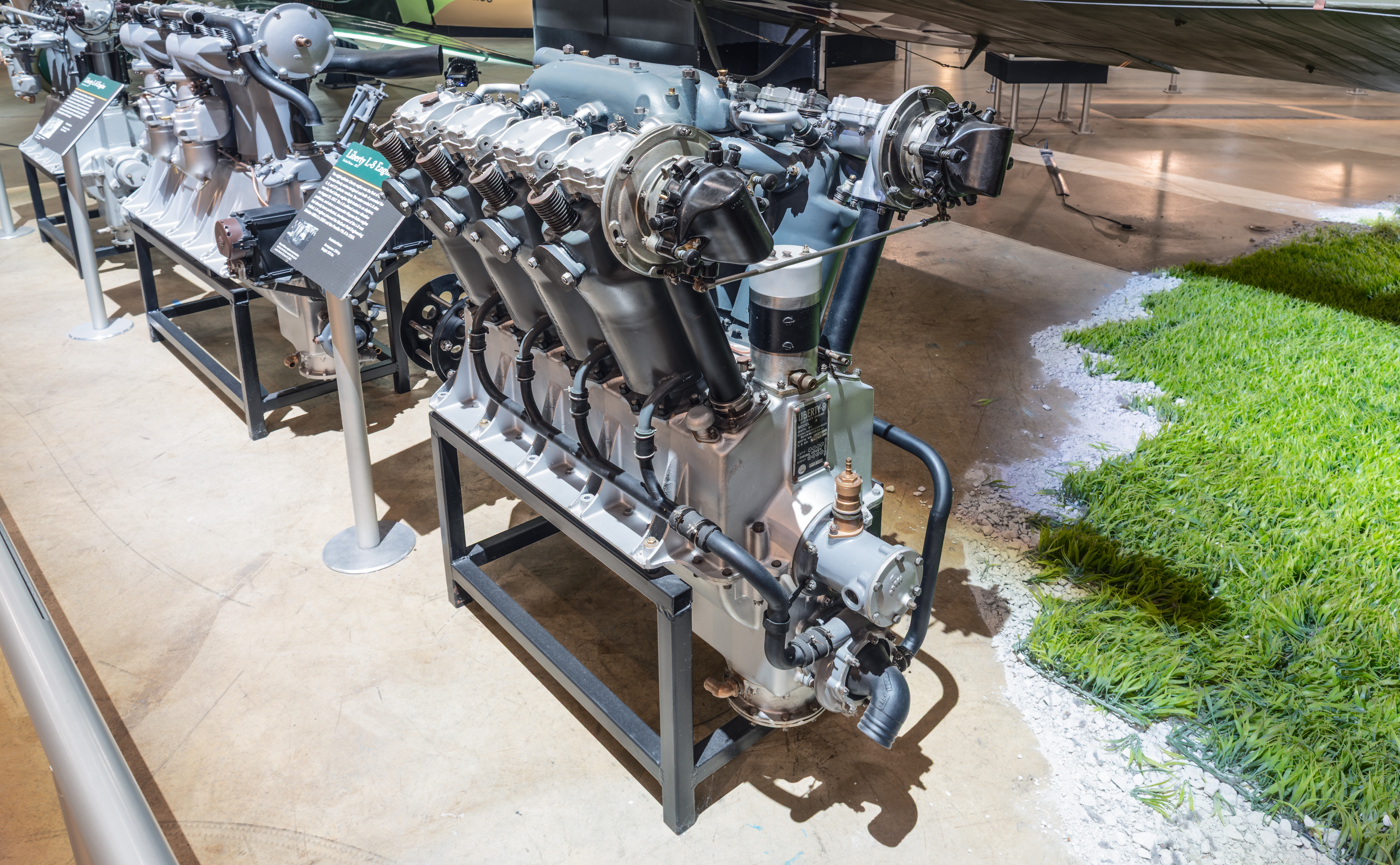
The Liberty L-8 at the National Museum of the U.S. Air Force in Dayton, OH.

Comparable engines

- Benz Bz.IIIb

Related lists

- List of aircraft engines
