= Sverige S-1 =

Sverige S–1 (lit. 'Sweden S–1') is a Swedish-built wooden speedboat built between 2011 and 2012 with the goal to beat the 1928 world speed record for wooden boats of 80.92 knots (149.86 km/h) set in 1928 by Garfield Wood with the boat Miss America VII. The current world speed record for wooden boats of 108.50 knots (200.94 km/h) was set in 1932 with the boat Miss America X.

The goal for S-1 Sverige is 100 knots (185 km/h), and after being built the boat soon managed to reach 65 knots (120 km/h) without a compressor. The boat has since sunk, been raised and rebuilt two times. During the last rebuild it was fitted with a compressor for increased motor power.

== History ==
The boat plans were originally drawn in 1929 by the Swedish boat constructor Ruben Östlund (1891–1981) after wishes from members of the Swedish Royal Motorboat Club to challenge the world's fastest wooden boat Miss America VIII in a competition at the Hudson River in the United States, but the plans were postponed due to the Wall Street stock market crisis the same year.

In the fall of 2011, construction was started in Sweden by Johansson & Son Båtbyggeri in Holmsund using the original drawings from 1929. The build was completed and demonstrated at the Swedish boat fair Allt för sjön in March 2012.

== Technical ==
The boat is powered by two 27-liter Rolls-Royce Meteor V12 petrol engines from two Swedish Centurion tanks, based on the same aluminium motor block as used in the British World War 2 Spitfire fighter plane. Fitted with compressors, the two engines yield a combined power output of about 1,800 kilowatts (2,400 hp) and a torque of 2400 Nm. The boat has a fixed-angle propeller shaft angled about 5 to 6 degrees, as in the original drawing. With the current setup, top speed is claimed to lie around 76–81 knots (140–150 km/h).

== Accidents ==
May 2012, the boat partially sank outside Sandhamn in Sweden after the propeller hit a hard object during an early test run, which tore off the propeller shaft leaving an opening in the hull. This resulted in the boat taking in large amounts of water upon slowing down. The boat ended up partially submerged, with only the front of the boat sticking up from the water. No persons were injured.

July 2015, the boat capsized in high speed (allegedly over 70 knots (130 km/h)) during the shootout boat race in the Powerboat Weekend in Sandhamn, Sweden, where the competing boats were to travel 1.000 nautical mile (1,852 m) in the shortest amount of time. The boat made a full rotation, and the crew were bruised heavily by the boat interior before being thrown out of the boat. Two out of the three-man crew were sent to hospital, but all escaped without serious injuries. The boat sank to a depth of about 10 meters, and was later raised and rebuilt at Johansson & Son Båtbyggeri.
