= Itoh Emi 3 =

1910s Japanese biplane aircraft

Emi 3

General information
- Type: Passenger seaplane
- National origin: Japan
- Manufacturer: Itoh Aeroplane Research Studio
- Designer: Otojiiro Otoh
- Number built: 1

History
- First flight: August 1917

The Itoh Emi 3 was the first Japanese civil passenger carrying seaplane, flown in 1917 and used for commercial demonstrations and passenger flights.

== Design and development ==
Though by around 1916 demonstration flights by early Japanese aircraft were beginning to be commercially viable, there were no suitable seaplanes. Otojiiro Otoh, who had designed and built Japan's second commercial landplane, the Itoh Emi 1, was encouraged to fill the gap. The result was the Emi 3, completed in August 1917.

Like most aircraft of its time, it was a wooden-framed and fabric covered biplane. It was a two bay design with wings braced by two pairs of parallel, vertical interplane struts on each side but, as the upper wing had a significantly longer span, there was also pairs of parallel, outward- leaning struts to brace the overhang. Only the upper wings carried ailerons.

Its water-cooled 80 hp (60 kW) Hall-Scott V-8 engine drove a two-bladed propeller. Close behind it there was an open cockpit for one passenger; the pilot's cockpit was just aft of the upper wing trailing edge. The Emi 3's fuselage was flat-sided and quite slender, with the horizontal tail mounted on its top. Its fin had a triangular profile and carried a rudder of roughly parallelogram profile.

It had twin floats, mounted with a pair of single struts to the fuselage forward and a transverse W-form strut to the fuselage and lower wing aft.

The Emi 3 was built at Itoh's Inage Beach site and completed in August 1917. Flight tests by several pilots found its performance, stability and handling were good.

== Operational history ==
Test flights over, the Emi 3 was taken by rail to Osaka and was prepared for demonstration flights at nearby Nishinomiya. Spectators' fees made these flights a commercial success for Japan's first passenger-carrying floatplane. Itoh named the only example Seagull (Kamome, かもめ).

== Specifications ==
Data from Japanese Aircraft 1910-1941

General characteristics

- Crew: one
- Capacity: one passenger
- Length: 7.27 m (23 ft 10 in)
- Upper wingspan: 15.41 m (50 ft 7 in)
- Height: 4.51 m (14 ft 10 in)
- Wing area: 46.5 m^{2} (501 sq ft)
- Empty weight: 580 kg (1,279 lb)
- Powerplant: 1 × Hall-Scott water-cooled V8, 60 kW (80 hp)
- Propellers: 2-bladed wooden

Performance

- Maximum speed: 80 km/h (50 mph, 43 kn)
