= Hall-Scott A-1 =

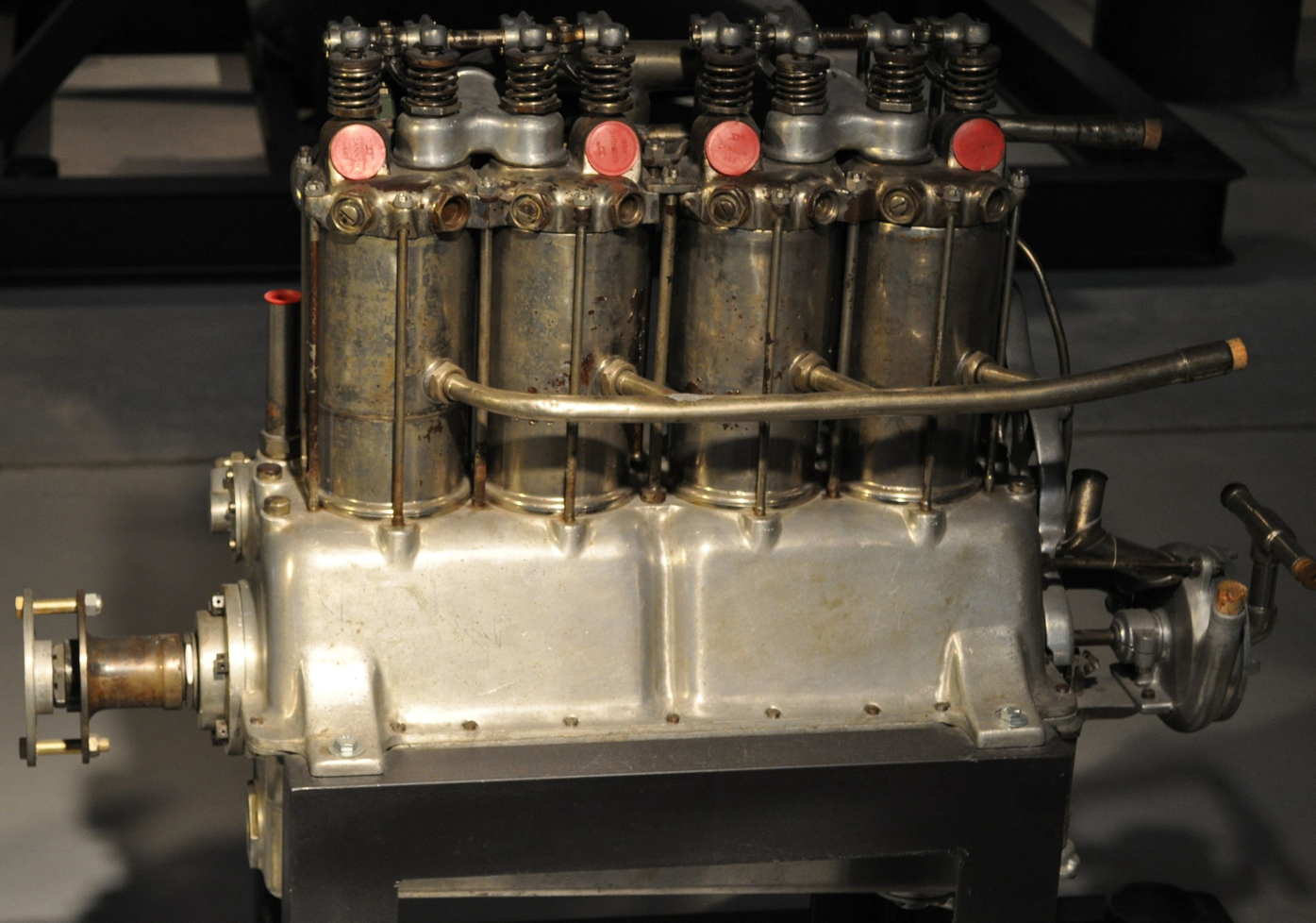
- Hall-Scott A-1 engine in the Steven F. Udvar-Hazy Center
- Type: Piston aero engine
- National origin: United States
- Manufacturer: Hall-Scott
- Designer: Elbert J. Hall

The Hall-Scott A-1 was an early aircraft engine. In a straight-4 configuration, it developed 40 horsepower (30 kW).

The Hall-Scott Motor Car Company began specializing in the construction of airplane engines in 1911. The Type A-1, the first one they produced, was soon being used on many types of early aircraft.

At the Third International Aviation Meet in Los Angeles in 1912, a Hall-Scott A-1 powered an aircraft designed by Jay Gage of Los Angeles and flown by Charles Stevens. During the 1912 International Aviation Meet in Oakland, Hillery Beachey, brother of famed aviator Lincoln J. Beachey, flew a biplane powered by an A-1.

== Specifications ==
Data from Airplane Engine Encyclopedia

=== General characteristics ===
- Type: 4-cylinder, liquid-cooled, inline aircraft engine
- Bore: 4 in (100 mm)
- Stroke: 5 in (130 mm)
- Displacement: 251.32 cubic inches (4.12 L)
- Length: 39 inches (991 mm)
- Width: 17.5 inches (444 mm)
- Height: 28 inches (710 mm)
- Dry weight: 165 pounds (74.8 kg)

=== Components ===
- Cooling system: liquid-cooled

=== Performance ===
- Power output: 40 horsepower (30 kW) at 1500 rpm
