= Garwood Load Packer =

American garbage truck

A Garwood Load Packer in 1943

The Garwood Load Packer (sometimes stylized as Gar Wood Load-Packer) is an American waste collection vehicle that was built by Garwood Industries in Detroit, Michigan. Engineered by Melvin Donald Silvey, the Packer brought significant changes in the mode and automation of garbage collection in the United States.

The Load Packer was one of the first vehicles to utilize a compactor, increasing the truck's hauling capacity and reducing the costs of larger payloads. The Load Packer was introduced in 1938, but significant numbers weren't manufactured until after World War II. Various reports of communities buying, or considering buying, Load Packers can be found in newspapers of the era—one such report from 1948 in Redondo Beach, California, cited a cost of $7,200 ($94,228 in 2024) for a Load Packer as compared to $4,200 ($52,349 in 2024) for a then-conventional garbage truck, but "it should pay for itself the first year" due to efficiency improvements.

By 1949, over 2,500 of these trucks were in use across the United States and Canada. The trucks were also used outside of North America, beginning as early as 1949 in Australia. Today, almost all waste collection vehicles utilize some type of compaction mechanism.

== See also ==
- Garfield Wood (1880–1971), founder and namesake of Garwood Industries
