= Liberty L-12 =

American aircraft engine

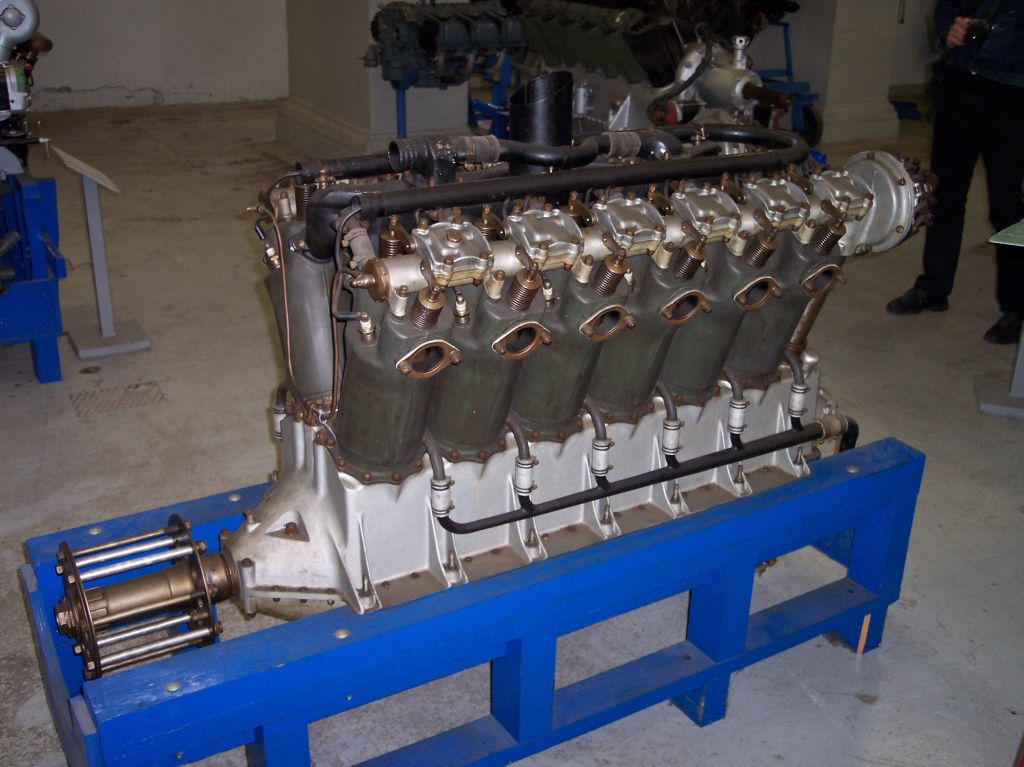
- Liberty L-12 aircraft engine
- Type: Piston aero engine
- National origin: United States of America
- Manufacturer: Lincoln, Ford, Packard, Marmon, Buick
- Designer: Jesse G. Vincent and Elbert J. Hall
- First run: c. 1917
- Number built: 20,748
- Variants: Liberty L-4, Liberty L-6, Liberty L-8

The Liberty L-12 is an American water-cooled 45° V-12 engine, displacing 1,649 cubic inches (27 L) and making 400 hp (300 kW), designed for a high power-to-weight ratio and ease of mass production. It was designed principally as an aircraft engine and saw wide use in aero applications. It also saw marine use (both in racing and in runabout boats) once it was marinized; it was used in various military tanks; and in some race cars.

A single bank 6-cylinder version, the Liberty L-6, and V-8, the Liberty L-8, were derived from the Liberty L-12. It was succeeded by the Packard 1A-2500.

== Development ==
In May 1917, a month after the United States had declared war on Germany, a federal task force known as the Aircraft Production Board summoned two top engine designers, Jesse G. Vincent (of the Packard Motor Car Company) and Elbert J. Hall (of the Hall-Scott Motor Company), to Washington. They were given the task of designing as rapidly as possible an aircraft engine that would rival if not surpass those of Great Britain, France, and Germany. The Board specified that the engine would have a high power-to-weight ratio and be adaptable to mass production.

The Board brought Vincent and Hall together on 29 May 1917 at the Willard Hotel in Washington, where the two were asked to stay until they produced a set of basic drawings. After just five days, Vincent and Hall left the Willard with a completed design for the new engine, which had adopted, almost unchanged, the single overhead camshaft and rocker arm valvetrain design of the later Mercedes D.IIIa engines of 1917–18.

In July 1917, an eight-cylinder prototype assembled by Packard's Detroit plant arrived in Washington for testing, and in August, the 12-cylinder version was tested and approved.

== Production ==
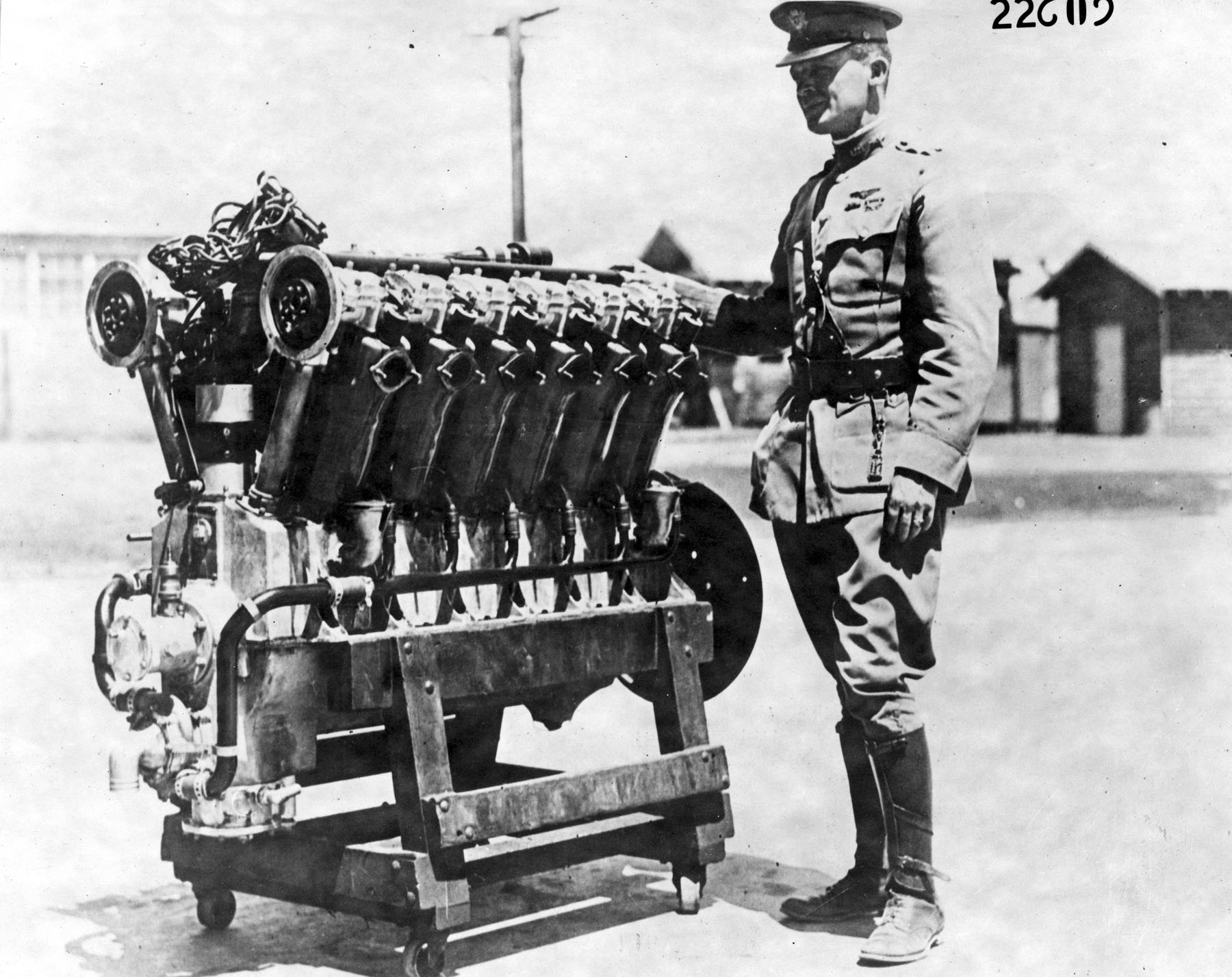
Major Henry H. "Hap" Arnold with the first Liberty V12 engine completed

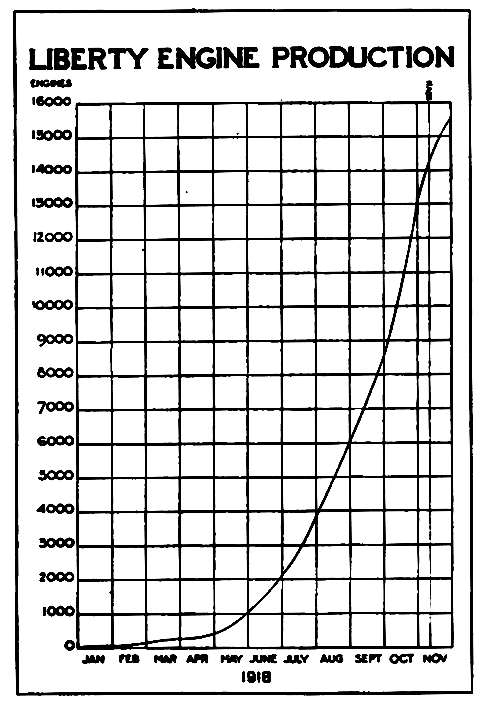
Liberty engine production

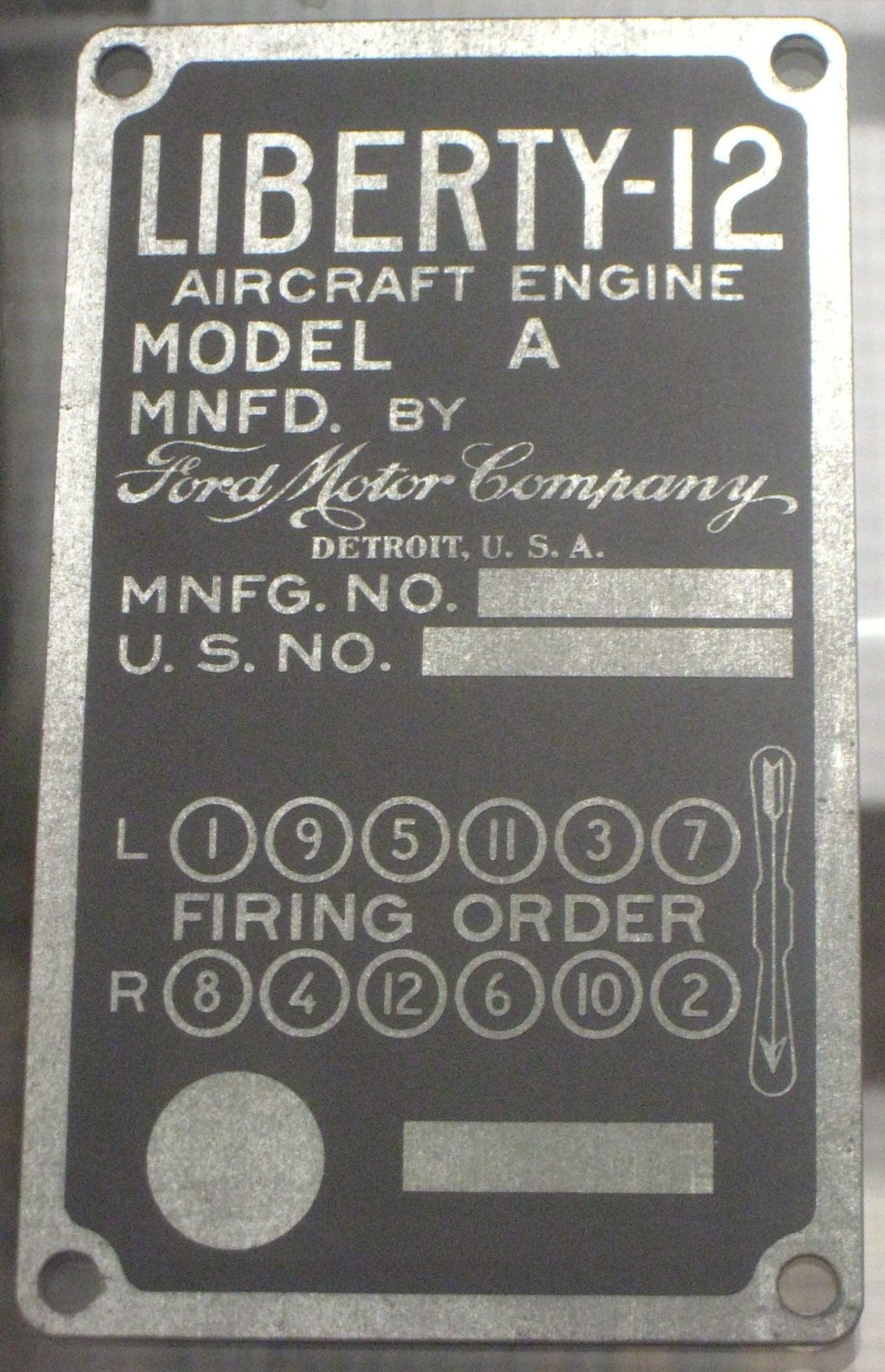
Ford Liberty 12 data plate with firing order

In the fall of 1917, the War Department placed an order for 22,500 Liberty engines, dividing the contract among the automobile and engine manufacturers Buick, Ford, Cadillac, Lincoln, Marmon, and Packard. Hall-Scott in California was considered too small to receive a production order. Manufacturing by multiple factories was facilitated by its modular design.

Ford was asked to supply cylinders for the new engine and rapidly developed an improved technique for cutting and pressing steel, which resulted in cylinder production rising from 151 per day to over 2,000; the company eventually manufactured all 433,826 cylinders produced, as well as 3,950 complete engines. Lincoln constructed a new plant in record time, devoted entirely to Liberty engine production, and assembled 2,000 engines in 12 months. By the time of the Armistice with Germany, the various companies had produced 13,574 Liberty engines, attaining a production rate of 150 engines per day. Production continued after the war, for a total of 20,478 engines built between July 4, 1917, and 1919.

Although it is widely reported otherwise, a few Liberty engines did see action in France as power for the American version of the British Airco DH.4.

=== Lincoln production ===
As the United States entered World War I, the Cadillac division of General Motors was asked to produce the new Liberty aircraft engine, but William C. Durant was a pacifist who did not want General Motors or Cadillac facilities to be used for producing war material. This led to Henry Leland leaving Cadillac to form the Lincoln Motor Company to make Liberty engines. He quickly gained a $10,000,000 (equal to $251,298,701 today) government contract to build 6,000 engines. Subsequently, the order was increased to 9,000 units, with an option for 8,000 more if the government needed them. (Durant later changed his mind and both Cadillac and Buick produced the engines.)

More than 16,000 Liberty engines were produced during the calendar year 1918. To November 11, 1918, more than 14,000 Liberty engines were produced. Lincoln had delivered 6,500 of the 400 hp (300 kW) V-12 overhead camshaft engines when production ceased in January 1919.

== Design ==
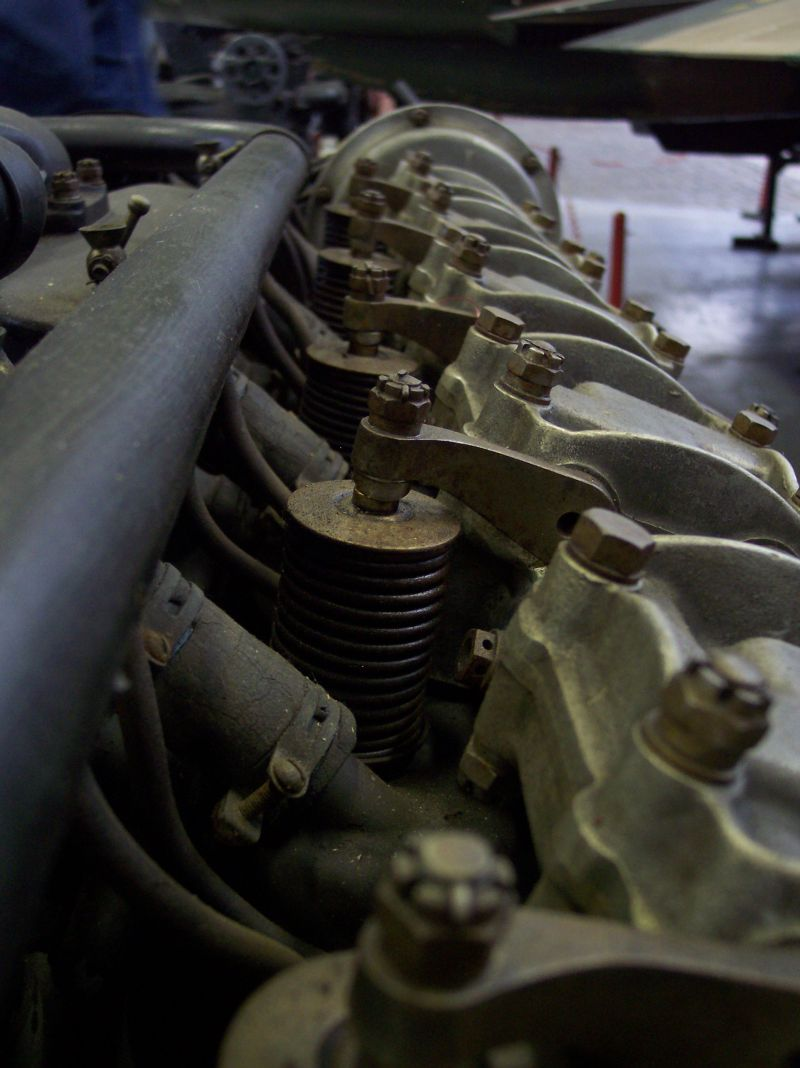
Closeup of a Liberty L-12's valvetrain details, almost matching the later Mercedes D.IIIa design

The Liberty engine was a modular design where four or six cylinders could be used in one or two banks, allowing for inline fours, V-8s, inline sixes, or the V-12.

The design was held together by a two-part cast aluminium crankcase. The two pieces formed the upper and lower halves of the completed assembly and were held together with a series of bolts running around the outside perimeter. As was common for the era, the cylinders were separately formed from forged steel tubes with thin metal jackets surrounding them to provide cooling water flow.

A single overhead camshaft for each cylinder bank operated two valves per cylinder, in an almost identical manner to the inline six-cylinder German Mercedes D.III and BMW III engines. Each camshaft was driven by a vertical driveshaft that was placed at the back of each cylinder bank, again identical to the Mercedes and BMW straight-six powerplants. Delco Electronics provided the ignition system and Zenith the carburetor. Dry weight was 844 lb (383 kg).

Fifty-two examples of a six-cylinder version, the Liberty L-6, which very closely resembled the Mercedes and BMW powerplants in overall appearance, were produced but not procured by the Army. A pair of the 52 engines produced were destroyed by William Christmas testing his so-called "Christmas Bullet" fighter.

== Variants ==
V-1650

An inverted Liberty 12-A referred to as the V-1650 was produced up to 1926 by Packard.

The same designation was later applied to the Packard V-1650 Merlin, an engine with nearly identical engine displacement. This was a World War II Packard produced version of the Rolls-Royce Merlin, and is not to be confused with the earlier Liberty-based version.

Allison VG-1410

The Allison VG-1410 was an air-cooled inverted Liberty L-12, with a geared super-charger, Allison epicyclic propeller reduction gear, and bore reduced to 4 5/8 in (120 mm), giving a lower displacement of 1,411 in^{3} (23.12 L).

Liberty L-6

A 6-cylinder version of the Liberty L-12, nicknamed the "Liberty Six", consisted of a single bank of cylinders, with the resulting engine bearing a strong external resemblance to both the Mercedes D.III and BMW III straight-six German aviation engines of World War I. 825 cubic inches (13.5 L)

Liberty L-8

An 8-cylinder V engine using Liberty cylinders in banks of four at 45°. 1,099.6 cubic inches (18.0 L)

Mikulin M-5
License production (or copies) produced in the USSR. Used in the Grigorovich I-2 and early variants of the BT tank.

Nuffield Liberty

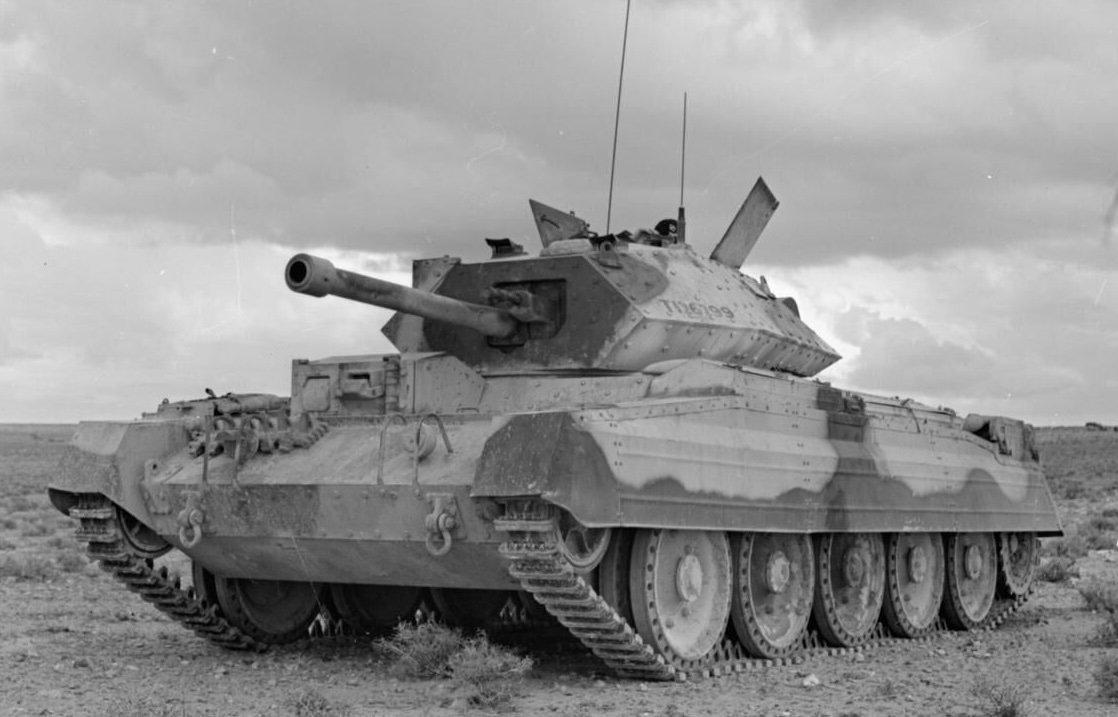
World War II Crusader Mk III, powered by Nuffield Liberty

The Nuffield Liberty tank engine was licensed and produced in World War II by the UK car manufacturer Nuffield. It was used in early cruiser tanks, the Crusader, the Cavalier, and finally Centaur tanks. It was a 27 L (1,649 in^{3}) engine with an output of 340 hp (250 kW; 340 PS), which was inadequate for the increasing vehicle weights as the war progressed and also suffered numerous problems with cooling and reliability.

The Nuffield Liberty ran through multiple versions:

- Mark I, US built engines modified in Britain. Modification incorporated new carburettors and a new induction system from Solex, revision of the crankcase breather, new timing gear, and revised crankshaft end thrust. This produced 340 hp (250 kW; 340 PS) when governed to 1,500 rpm with the new carburettors.
- Mark II, British built engines. The air compressor (for starting) was not used, and was removed on later engines
- Mark III, IIIA and IIIB, made for the Crusader tank. This required a reduced height to fit in the engine bay, achieved by redesigning the oil pump and relocating the water pump. The air compressor was reinstated to enable pneumatically-operated braking and steering. Significant problems were experienced in desert use (the North African Campaign), and the Mk III went through multiple revisions. This included three different chain drive designs for the ancillary cooling fans, a revised valve adjustment mechanism, increased compression ratio, revised oil feeds, and two water pump replacements.
- Mark IV, a revised design providing a shaft drive for cooling fans. This replaced the troublesome chain drive. This version also changed the air compressor to run at a lower speed.
- Mark IVA, the power was increased to 410 hp (310 kW; 420 PS) by increasing the governor limit to 1,700 rpm, and by fitting a new intake manifold and carburettor for the Cavalier tank.
- Mark V, a redesigned engine producing the same power as the Mark IVA but for use in the Centaur tank. It revised the oil distribution in the engine, but remained governed to the higher speed of 1,700 rpm. The engine was intended for the Cromwell tank, but the Liberty-based design was dropped in favour of the Rolls-Royce Meteor procured by the Tank Board. Those tanks fitted with Liberty were renamed Centaur, and production was split.

== Applications ==
=== Aircraft ===
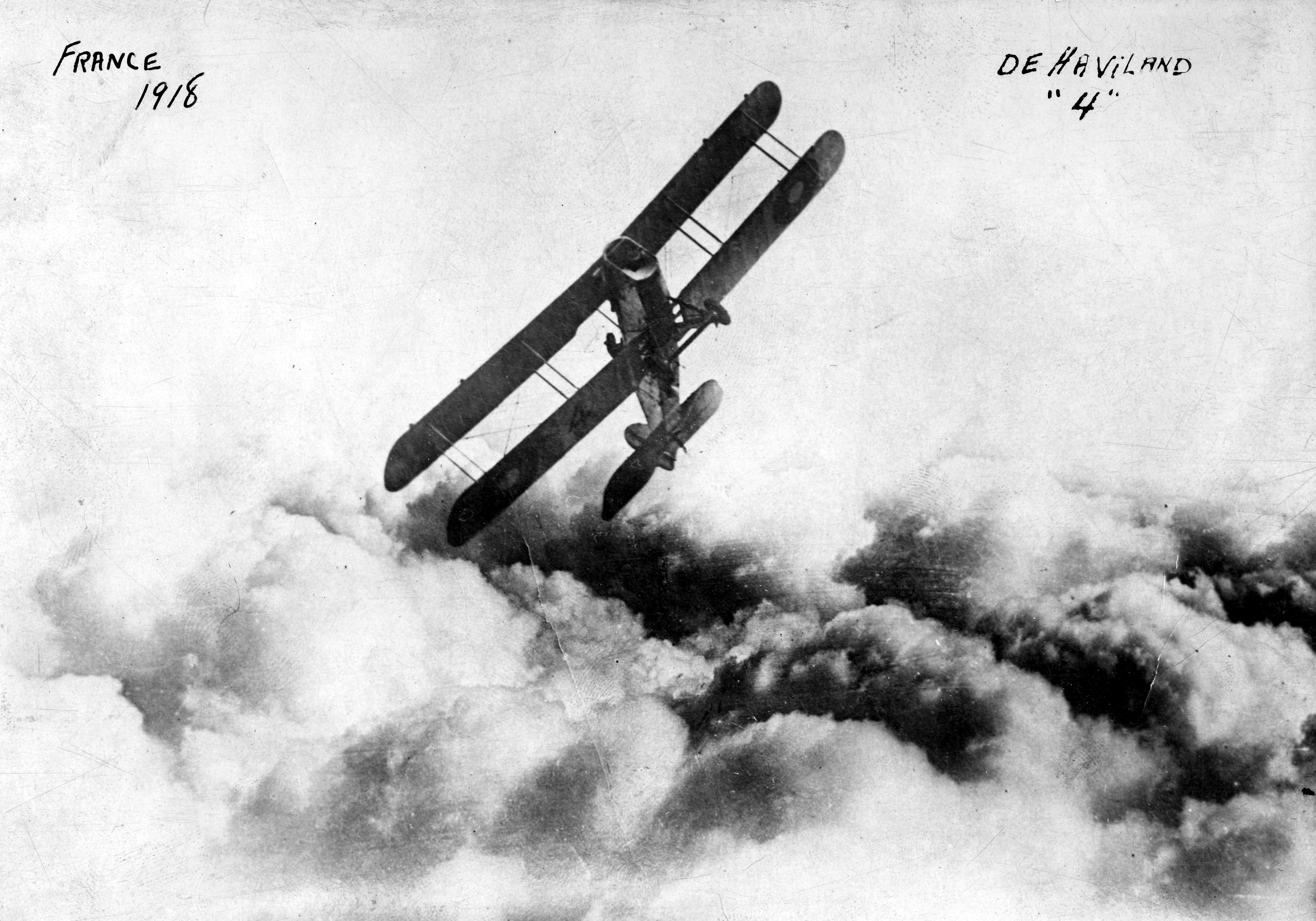
Airco DH.4 in flight over France during World War I

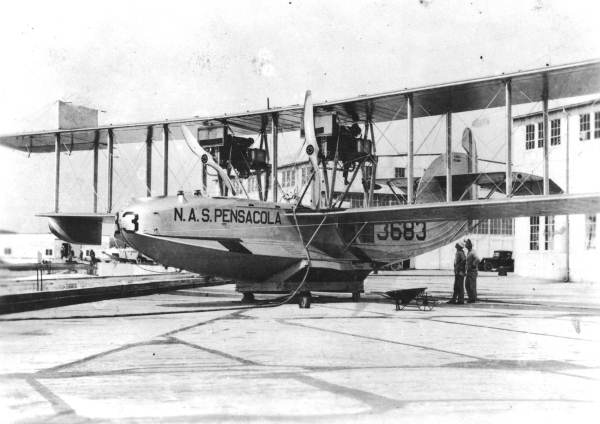
Felixstowe F5L

The primary use of the Liberty was in aircraft.

- American-built versions of the Airco DH.4
- Airco DH.9A
- Airco DH.10 Amiens
- Breguet 14 B2 L
- Caproni Ca.60
- Curtiss H-16
- Curtiss HS
- Curtiss NC
- Curtiss Carrier Pigeon
- Douglas C-1
- Douglas DT
- Douglas O-2
- Felixstowe F5L
- Fokker T.II
- Handley Page H.P.20
- Keystone LB-5
- Witteman-Lewis XNBL

The engine was also used in the RN-1 (Zodiac) blimp.

=== Automobile ===
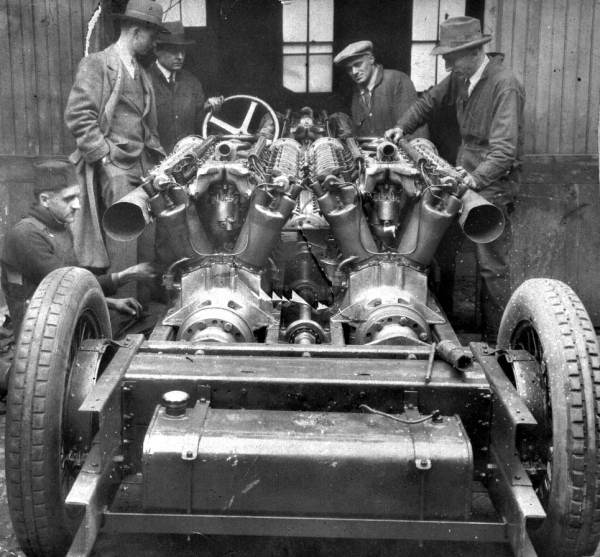
The White Triplex

Based on aircraft use the engine provided a good power-to-weight ratio. This made it ideal for use in land speed attempt vehicles.

It was selected for two land speed record attempts.

- Babs, a single engined vehicle
- White Triplex, mounting three Liberty engines working in tandem

Both attempts set new records. Both crashed during further attempts, resulting in the deaths of the drivers and a newsreel cameraman.

=== Tank ===
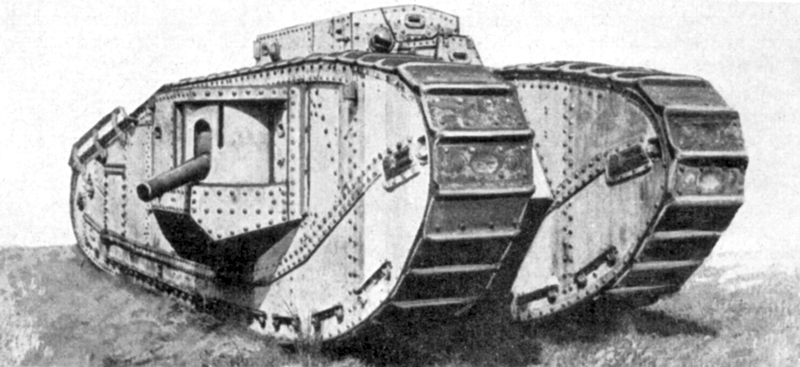
World War I Mark VIII "Liberty" tank

As early as 1917 the Liberty showed good potential for use in tanks as well as aircraft. The Anglo-American, or "Liberty", Mark VIII tank was designed in 1917–18. The American version used an adaptation of the Liberty V-12 engine of 300 hp (220 kW), designed to use cast iron cylinders rather than drawn steel ones. One hundred tanks were manufactured at the Rock Island Arsenal in 1919–20, too late for World War I. They were eventually sold to Canada for training in 1940, except for two that have been preserved.

Inter-war, J. Walter Christie combined aircraft engines with new suspension design, producing a rapid and highly mobile tank. Using Christie's concept, Russian forces selected and copied the Liberty in the BT-2 & BT-5 Soviet interwar tank (at least one reconditioned Liberty was installed in a BT-5). Demonstration of this tank was witnessed by the British, and Christie's design characteristics were licensed and incorporated into the British A13 design specification.

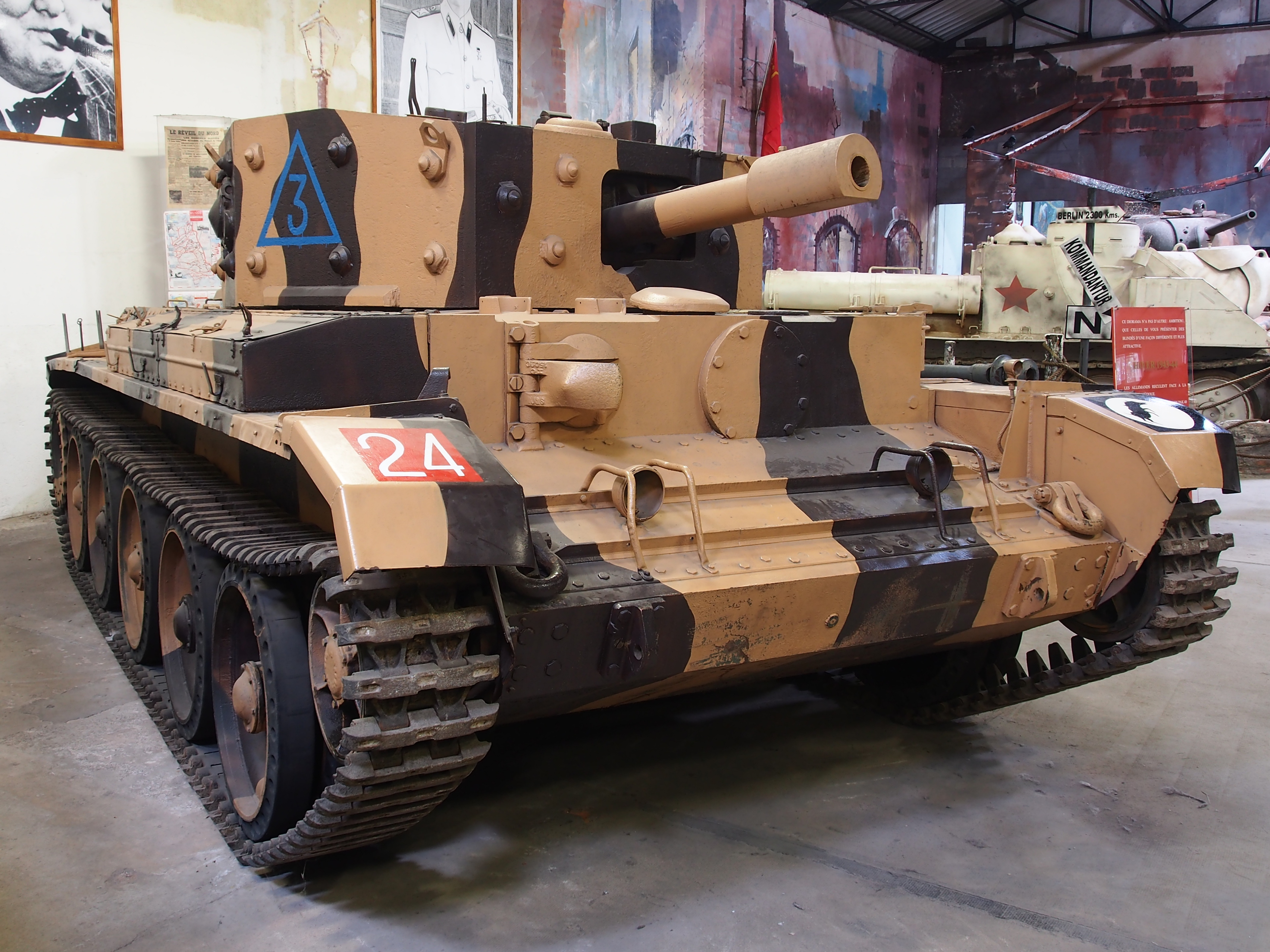
World War II Centaur tank, the last type to fit the Nuffield Liberty

As World War II loomed, Nuffield, producing British cruiser tanks, licensed and re-engineered the Liberty for use in the A13 (produced as the Cruiser Mk III) and later cruiser tanks, with an output of 340 hp (410 hp from the Mark IV version). In later British tanks it was replaced by the Rolls-Royce Meteor, an engine based on the Rolls-Royce Merlin aero engine, which offered greater engine power (600 hp).

Nuffield Liberty engines were used in British tanks of immediate pre-war and Second World War:

- Cruiser Mk III (A13 Mark I) – Nuffield Liberty Mk I
- Cruiser Mk IV (A13 Mark II) – Nuffield Liberty Mk II
- Crusader tank – Nuffield Liberty Mk III, IIIA, IIIB, or IV
- Cavalier tank – Nuffield Liberty Mk IVA
- Centaur tank – a parallel version of the Meteor-engined Cromwell British World War II tank – Nuffield Liberty Mk V

=== Watercraft ===
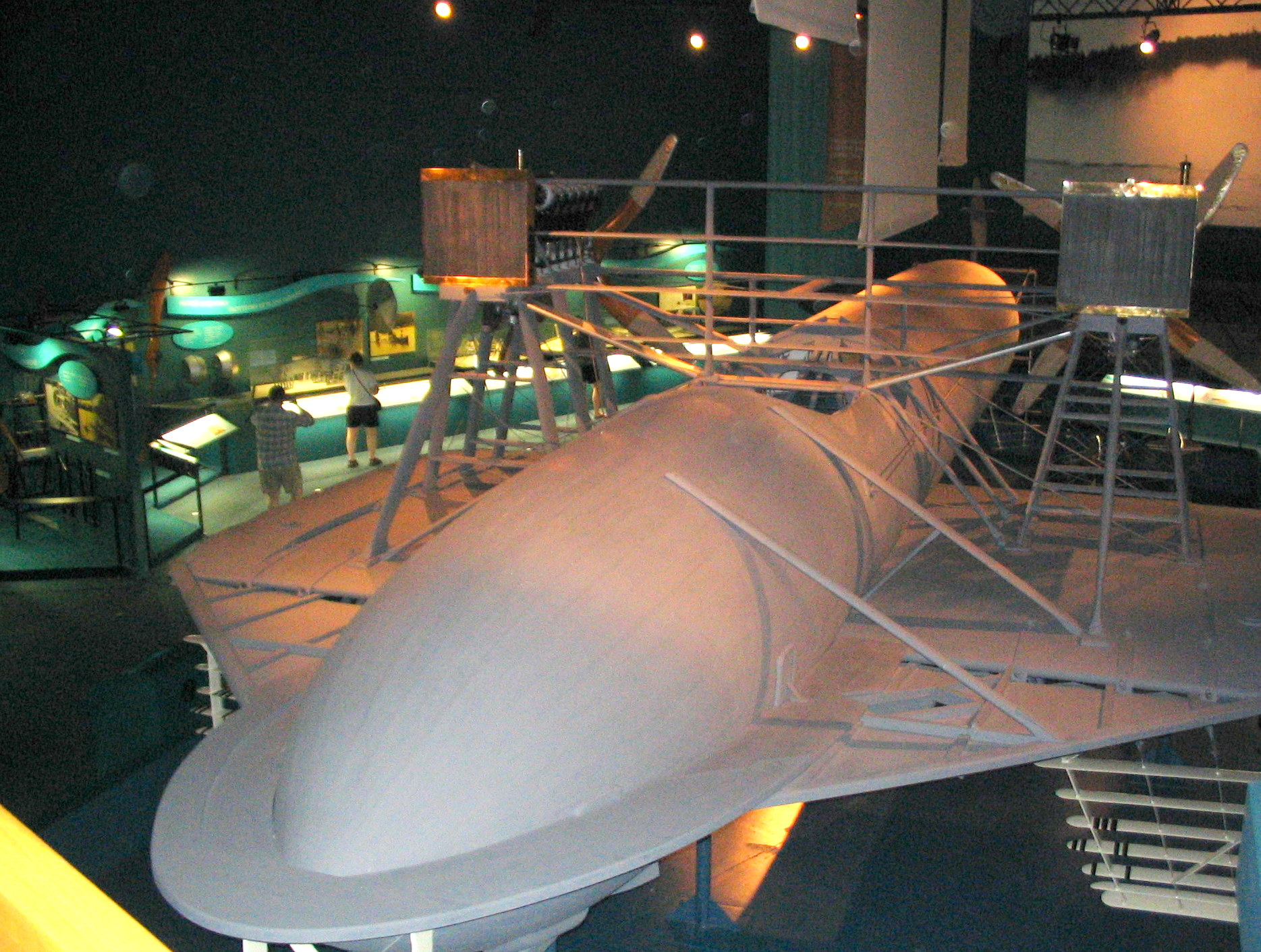
HD-4 hydrofoil at the Alexander Graham Bell National Historic Site

HD-4 or Hydrodome number 4 was an early research hydrofoil watercraft developed by the scientist Alexander Graham Bell. In 1919, it set a world marine speed record of 70.86 miles per hour (114.04 km/h) powered by two 350 hp Liberty L-12s.

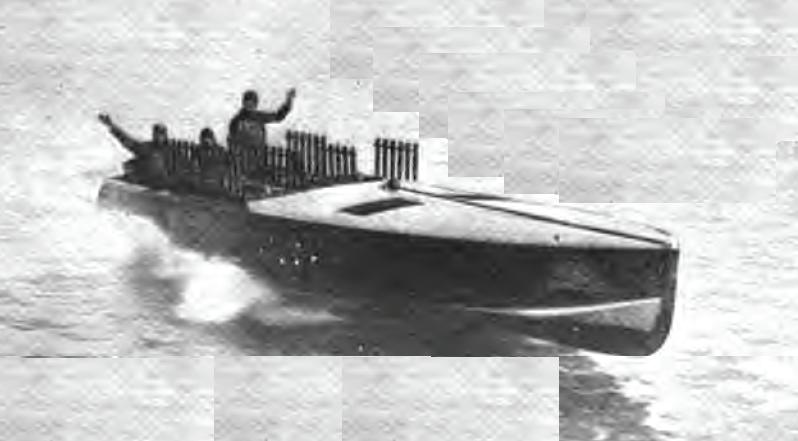
World speed record breaker and five-time Gold Cup champion Gar Wood at the helm of triple Liberty L-12-powered Miss America 2, the second of nine Packard V-12 driven Miss Americas and 1921 Harmsworth Trophy winner

Inventor, entrepreneur, and boat racer Gar Wood set a new water speed record of 74.870 miles per hour (120.492 km/h) in 1920 in a new twin Liberty V-12 powered boat called Miss America. In the following twelve years, Wood built nine more Packard V-12 driven Miss Americas and broke the record five times, raising it to 124.860 miles per hour (200.943 km/h). He also won five straight powerboat Gold Cup races between 1917 and 1921, and the prestigious Harmsworth Trophy nine times between 1920 and 1933, at the helm of his Miss Americas.

Many gentlemen's runabouts, Gold Cup, and other race-winners were built with Liberty L-12 engines.

== Surviving engines ==
A number of Liberty engines survive in restored operational and static display vehicles. Displays of the engine itself include:

Australia

- A Liberty 12 from a DH.9A is on display at the Australian Aviation Heritage Centre in Darwin, Northern Territory

United Kingdom

- A Nuffield Liberty is on display at The Tank Museum, Bovington

United States

- A 12A is on display at the New England Air Museum at Bradley International Airport in Windsor Locks, Connecticut.
- An operable Liberty V-12 on a static test stand trailer is often run for demonstrations at Old Rhinebeck Aerodrome's weekend airshow events.
- A Packard Liberty V-1650 Aircraft engine (cut-away)- 12 cylinder "v" type water cooled engine; 400 h.p. at 1700 r.p.m. 5" bore, 7" stroke, 8431 lbs., 45-degree angle cylinders, and aluminum pistons is on exhibit on a display stand at Carillon Historical Park in Dayton, Ohio.

== Specifications ==
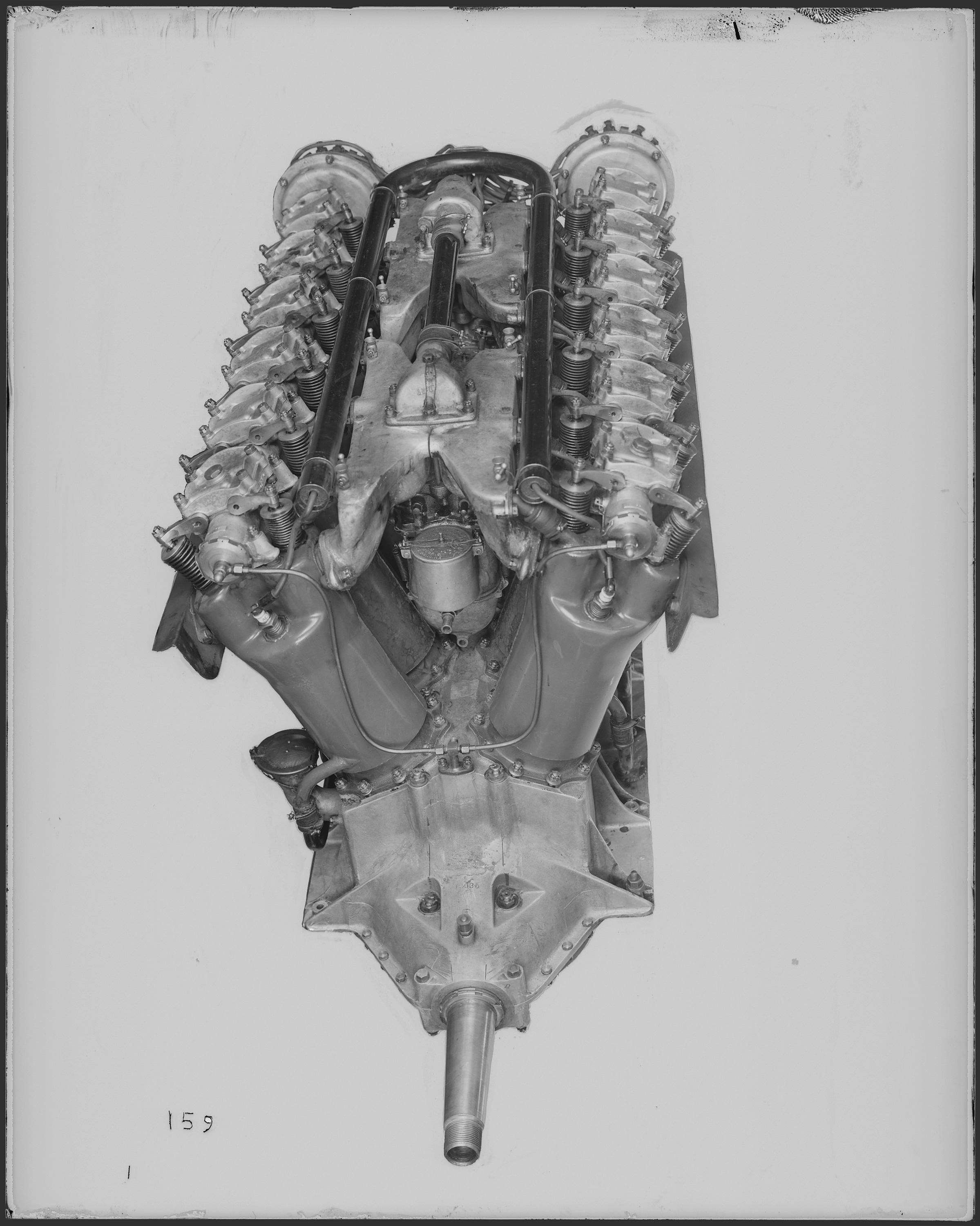

Data from Janes's All the World's Aircraft 1919

=== General characteristics ===
- Type: 12-cylinder liquid-cooled 45° Vee piston aircraft engine
- Bore: 5 in (127.0 mm)
- Stroke: 7 in (177.8 mm)
- Displacement: 1,649.3 in^{3} (27.02 L)
- Length: 67.375 in (1,711.3 mm)
- Width: 27 in (690 mm)
- Height: 41.5 in (1,050 mm)
- Dry weight: 844 lb (383 kg)

=== Components ===
- Valvetrain: One intake and one exhaust valves per cylinder operated via a single overhead camshaft per cylinder bank
- Fuel system: Two duplex Zenith carburettors
- Fuel type: Gasoline
- Oil system: forced feed, rotary gear pressure and scavenge pumps, wet sump.
- Cooling system: Water-cooled

=== Performance ===
- Power output: 400 hp (300 kW) at 1,800 rpm (takeoff)
- Specific power: 0.27 hp/cu in (12.4 kW/L)
- Compression ratio: 5.4:1 (Army engines) 5:1 (navy engines)
- Specific fuel consumption: 0.565 pt/hp/hour (0.43 L/kW/hour)
- Oil consumption: 0.0199 pt/hp/hour (0.0152 L/kW/hour)
- Power-to-weight ratio: 0.53 hp/lb (0.87 kW/kg)

== See also ==
Comparable engines

- BMW VI

Related lists

- List of aircraft engines
- List of Ford engines
