= Jesse G. Vincent =

American engine designer (1880–1962)

Jesse Gurney Vincent
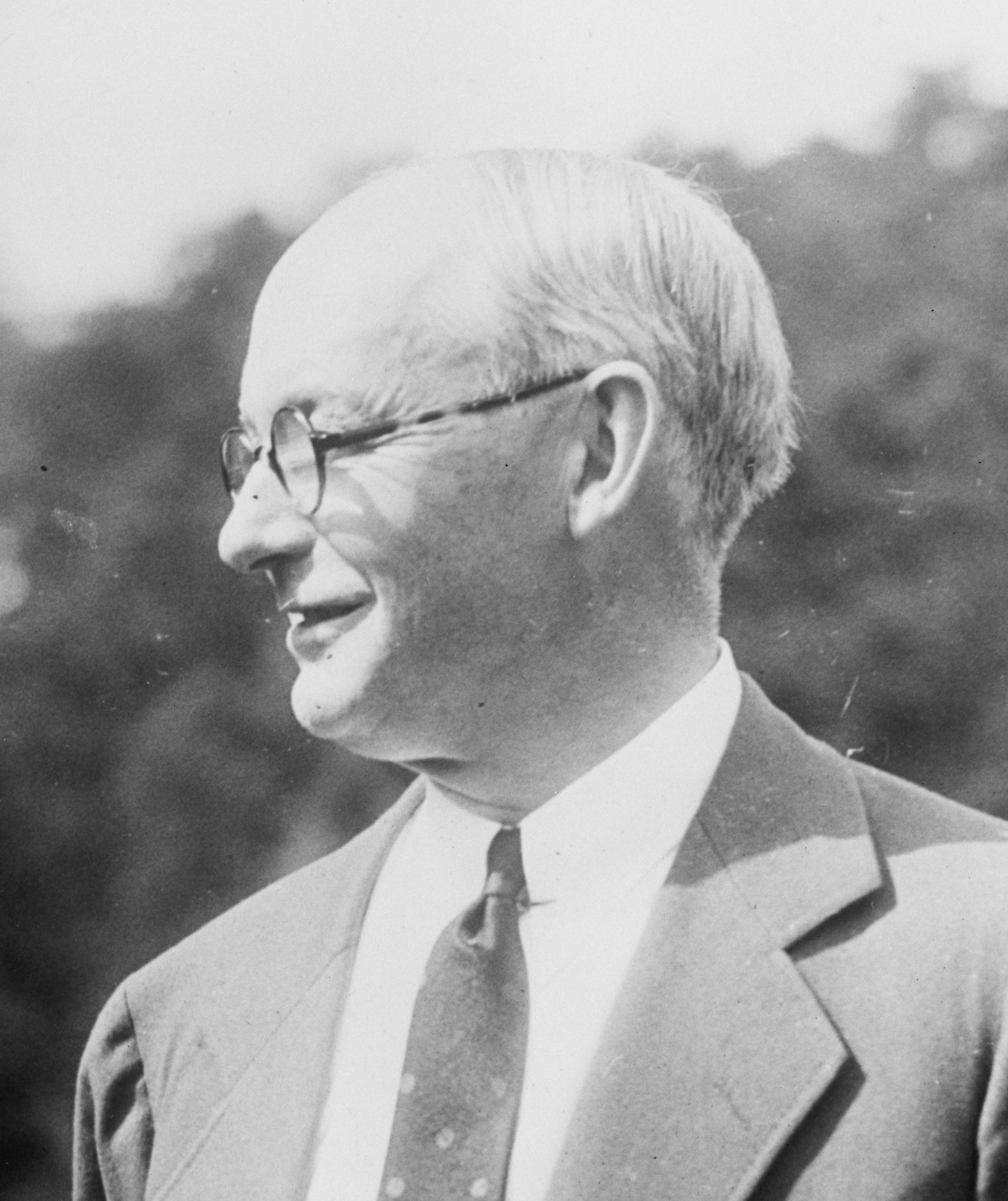
- Vincent in 1936
- Born: February 10, 1880; Charleston, Arkansas
- Died: April 20, 1962 (aged 82)
- Occupation: Engine designer
- Employer(s): Burroughs Adding Machine Company, Packard Motor Car Company, Hudson Motor Car Company
- Known for: Chief engineer for Packard automobiles

Jesse Gurney Vincent (February 10, 1880 – April 20, 1962) was an American aircraft, marine, and automobile engine designer. Famed initially for his design of the World War I Liberty aircraft engine, he rose to enduring prominence as the longtime chief engineer for Packard automobiles.

== Early life ==
Born in Charleston, Arkansas on February 10, 1880, Vincent came from a promising lineage for his chosen career. His maternal grandfather had been the Union Army's director of railroad design and engineering for its rail network during the Civil War, pivotal in the Confederacy's inevitable defeat. Vincent studied engineering in his spare time from a course offered by International Correspondence Schools. Vincent established himself with "a thick portfolio of patents" at the Burroughs Adding Machine Company in Detroit before moving on to become acting chief engineer for the Hudson Motor Car Company late in 1910. Jesse Vincent was a very close friend of Hudson's cofounder Howard E. Coffin.

== Packard career ==
He joined Packard on July 29, 1912 and began his rise there. World War I briefly affected-but did not interrupt-his career. Commissioned as a major in the U.S. Army Signal Corps, he "achieved immortality for his role in creation of the Liberty V-12 aircraft engine during World War I". Collaborating with Elbert J. Hall of the Hall-Scott Motor Company, the pair designed the V-12 Liberty powerplant for the Army Air Force in just five days. The effort, however, was late in the war and only a fraction of the engines ended up in military aircraft. By the time of the Armistice with Germany various companies had produced 13,574 Liberty engines; including those made to fulfill wartime contracts a total of 20,478 were built between July 4, 1917 and 1919.

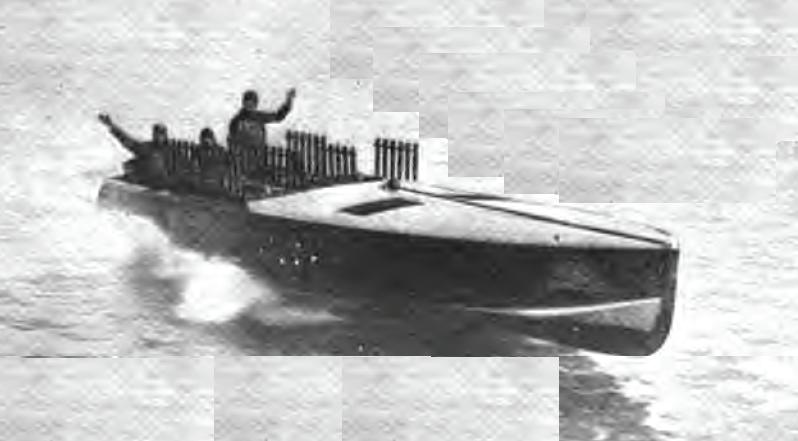
World speed record breaker and five-time Gold Cup champion Gar Wood at the helm of triple Liberty L-12-powered Miss America 2, the second of nine Packard V-12 driven Miss Americas and 1921 Harmsworth Trophy winner

The result was a huge surplus of Libertys, sold at steep discount to private buyers. Many ended up converted to marine use in high-end recreational speedboats and championship racers, an avocation Vincent became a prime player in. Among his victories was the 1922 Gold Cup, driving Packard-Criscraft and breaking a five-year winning streak by rival and business collaborator Gar Wood. Delivered to "Colonel Vincent" just in time for the race, it was the first boat to sport the soon to become iconic Chris-Craft moniker.

Vincent remained as Packard's head of engineering until his retirement in 1946, leaving an imprint on virtually every Packard produced since World War I. He is immortalized as "America’s Master Motor Builder" on a State of Michigan marker honoring the vast Packard Proving Grounds, the first facility for testing automobile and engine performance in the U.S.

One of the earliest members of the Society of Automotive Engineers, Vincent rose to president of that organization and was subsequently elected by it to the Automotive Hall of Fame. He died in 1962, having regrettably seen the demise of Packard four years earlier.

== See also ==
- Media related to Jesse G. Vincent at Wikimedia Commons
