= Antique Boat Museum =

Museum

Coordinates: 44°14′17″N 76°05′21″W

The Antique Boat Museum is a located in the 1000 Islands on the St. Lawrence River, in Clayton, New York, United States. The Antique Boat Museum is the premier freshwater boating museum in North America. The ABM's collections hold over 320 unique boats and thousands of related artifacts and archives. The 4.5-acre campus comes alive with speedboat rides, a working skiff livery, and educational programs. It is the site for the country's longest, continuously running annual Antique Boat Show and Auction. The museum has seasonal hours and is open from the first Friday in May to the end of October.

== Mission statement ==
"The Antique Boat Museum collects, preserves, interprets and celebrates boats and related artifacts to advance public understanding of the importance of boating to the cultural history of North America and the St. Lawrence River in particular."

== History ==
In the 1960s, a small nucleus of people who were determined to preserve the nautical and cultural heritage of the St. Lawrence River established the 1000 Islands Museum on the St. Lawrence River in Clayton, NY. Within the museum, a group concerned with preserving the area's rich boating heritage formed the Antique Boat Auxiliary and organized a show of antique boats in 1965. The boat show became an annual event and grew steadily in size. Under the auspices of the Antique Boat Auxiliary, a small group of supporters acquired several parcels of waterfront property in the early 1970s and established a permanent museum to host the annual boat show. The new institution received a provisional charter from the NY State Department of Education as the "1000 Islands Shipyard Museum" in 1980 and was granted an absolute charter in 1986. A 1990 amendment to the charter changed the institution's name to the "Antique Boat Museum".

In the 50 years since its founding, the Museum has built up a substantial waterfront campus that encompasses 4.5 acres of public program space, 1900′ of dockage, and 1300′ of St. Lawrence River shoreline. The 10 buildings, 5 on the main campus, contain 29,000 square feet of exhibit space, 33,000 square feet of public program, collections storage, archives, library and administration space. The exhibits and programs are supported by 20,000 square feet of boat collection storage located a short distance from the Museum's main campus. In the last decade, the Museum has undertaken a substantial capital expansion program to consolidate its real estate holdings and to construct buildings and infrastructure worthy of its collection and programs. From humble beginnings as a riverside gathering of antique boat enthusiasts, the Antique Boat Museum has evolved into a national institution which makes substantial economic and cultural contributions to Clayton, the North Country region, and the preservation of North America's maritime heritage.

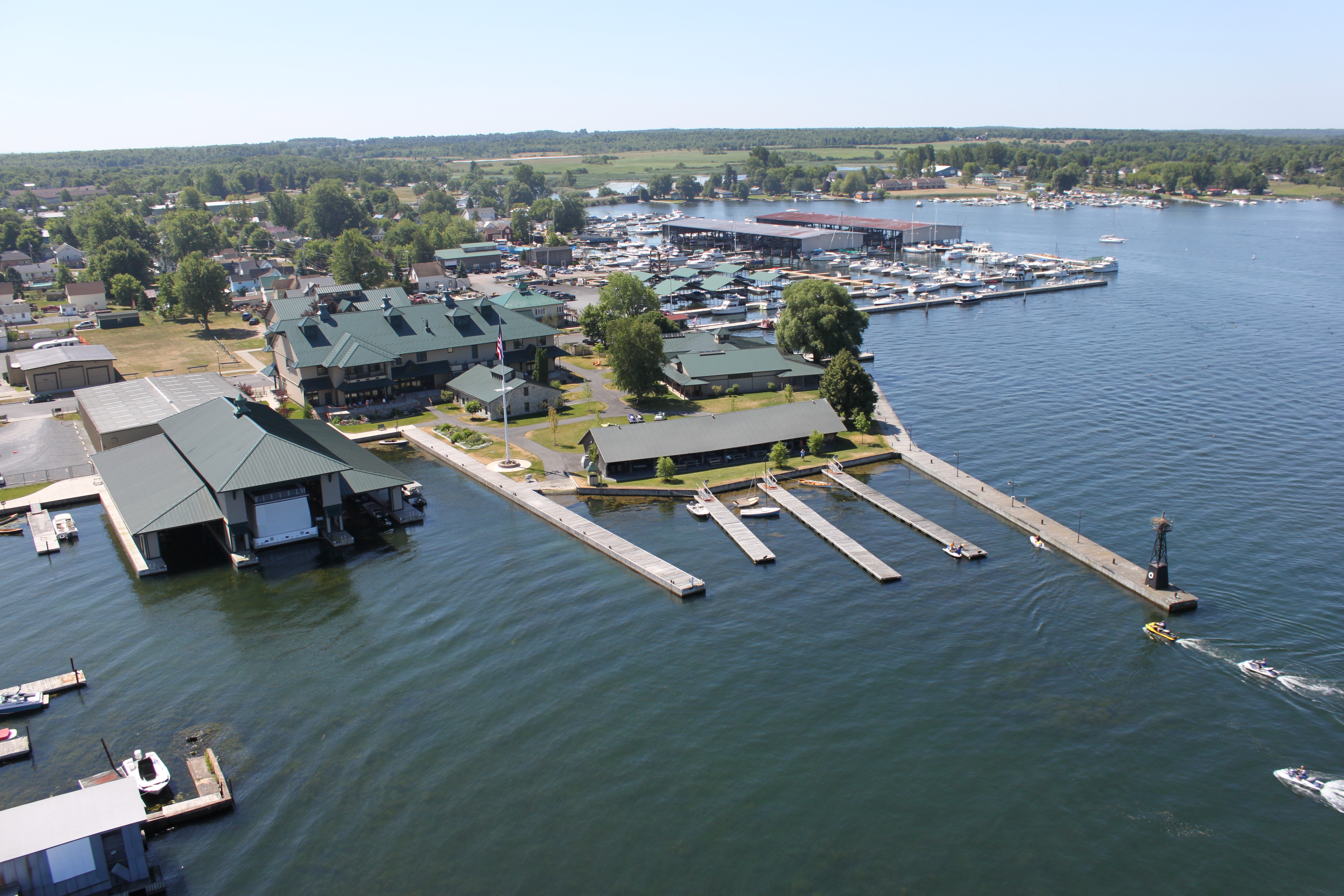
Aerial of the Antique Boat Museum in Clayton, NY

== See also ==
- List of maritime museums in the United States
