= Hall-Scott =

American manufacturing company

- Industry: Engine manufacturing
- Founded: 1910 in Berkeley, California
- Founders: Elbert J. Hall; Bert C. Scott
- Defunct: 1960
- Fate: Dissolved
- Parent: American Car and Foundry Company (1925–1954)

Hall-Scott Motor Car Company was an American manufacturing company based in Berkeley, California. It was among the most significant builders of water-cooled aircraft engines before World War I.

== History ==
=== 1910–21 ===
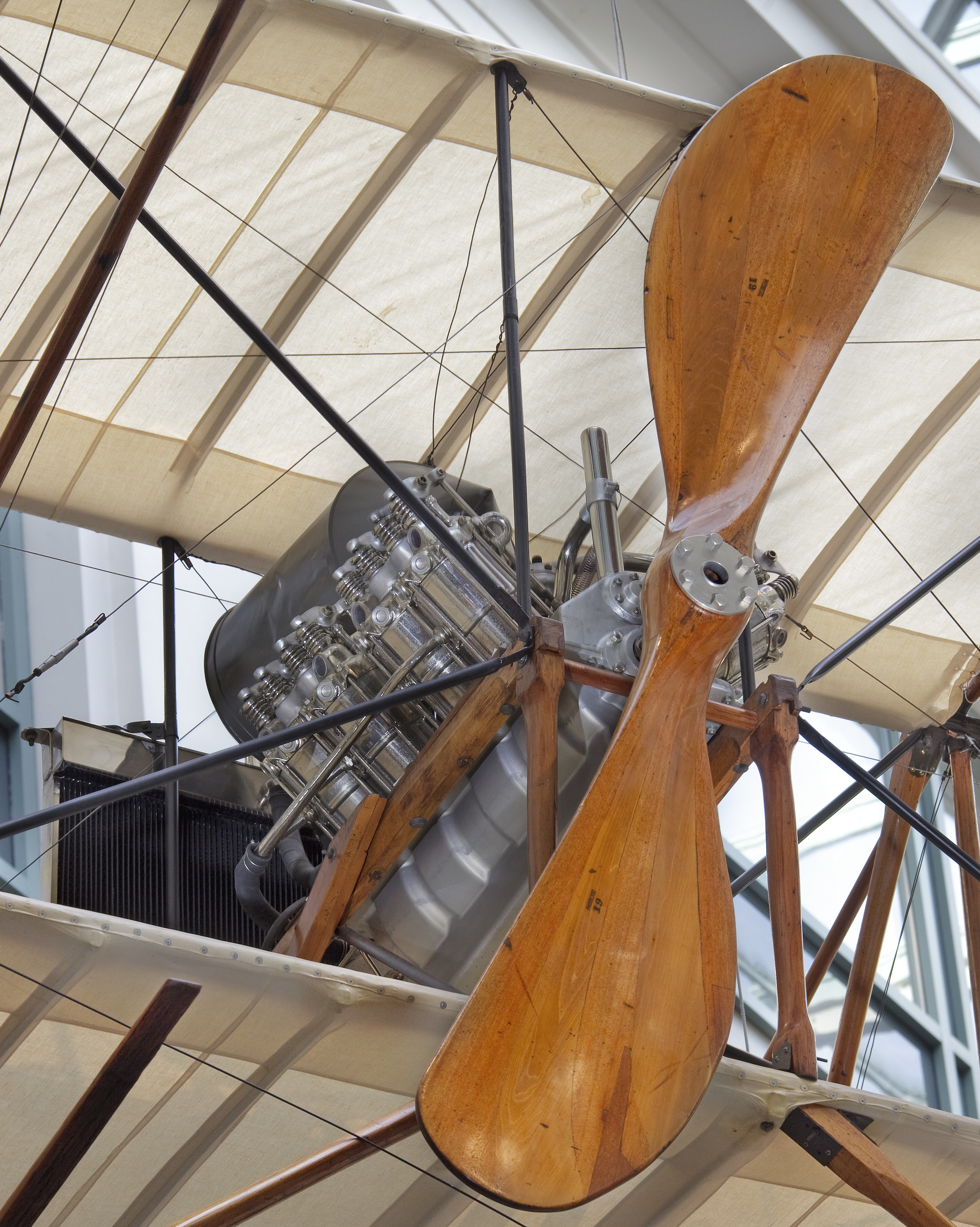
Wiseman-Cooke biplane mit 60-PS-Hall-Scott A-2-Motor National Air and Space Museum

The company was founded in 1910 by Californians Elbert J. Hall and Bert C. Scott to manufacture engines for automobiles and later expanded the production of engines for trucks and airplanes as well as gasoline-powered rail cars and locomotives. Hall was a mechanic and engine builder and Scott, Stanford University-educated, was the business executive. They produced their first rail car in 1909, which they sold to the Yreka Railroad. In 1910, a factory was opened in Berkeley, California, with headquarters for a short time in San Francisco. The company built interurban electric railway cars for railroads such as the electrified Sacramento Northern, which ran trains from adjacent Oakland to Sacramento and Chico. The rail car business was slow, but some were sold as far away as China.

In 1910, Hall-Scott also began manufacturing aircraft engines for commercial and military aviation. These engines possessed a remarkable power-to-weight ratio for the era, using an overhead cam, overhead valves, hemispherical combustion chamber, and extensive use of aluminum. Their various engine types shared parts and dimensions, reducing cost. Hall helped Jesse G. Vincent of Packard design the famous Liberty airplane engine, which has a number of features that are discernibly Hall-Scott. It was initially called U.S.A Standardized Aircraft Engine. Even so, Hall-Scott was too small to participate in the manufacture of the Liberties.

=== 1921–45 ===
Around 1921, Hall-Scott dropped its aero engine and rail car product lines, and expanded into building engines for tractors, trucks, boats, and stationary applications. The firm produced several hundred thousand two-speed rear axles, the Ruckstell Axle, for Ford's Model T through the mid-1920s.

In 1921, E. J. Hall began developing the valve system of Duesenberg racing engines and developed new cam lobe profiles that improved engines' reliability and power output. His research provided an understanding of the importance of the gradual opening and closing of valves and the effect this had on valve spring durability in high-speed engines. The designs he specified gave Duesenberg an immediate advantage and were quickly copied and applied to all high-speed engines using poppet valves, which continued to the present day. This work was done in Berkeley, suggesting that Hall may have used his company's resources.

In 1925, the company was purchased by American Car and Foundry, which used its engines in its buses and boats. 1931 saw the introduction of the Invader marine engine, one of the firm's most famous and important products. The company survived the Depression and then attained its highest production rates and employment numbers in World War II by building engines for a variety of military products, including a tank retriever, the M-26/M-26A1, and the Higgins boat (LCVP).

=== 1945–60 ===
Some post-World War II ACF-Brill buses manufactured in Philadelphia and purchased by Greyhound and Trailways were equipped with Hall-Scott engines. Its last all-new motor, the 590, came out in 1954.

That year, ACF divested itself of Hall-Scott, which became independent as Hall-Scott, Inc. Annual engine sales remained below 1,000 in the 1950s, so the company sought revenue by purchasing a number of firms outside engine making. This had little effect on the bottom line, and so in 1958 Hall-Scott sold its engine division to Hercules Motors Corporation and closed the Berkeley plant. The final engines bearing the Hall-Scott name were produced by Hercules in Canton, Ohio, in the late 1960s.

In 1960 Hall-Scott disappeared as a discrete company when the non-engine division of the company merged with Dubois Holding Company.

== Museum exhibits ==
Two Hall-Scott interurban coaches from the former Sacramento Northern Railroad (serial numbers 1019 and 1020) are at the Western Railway Museum at Rio Vista, California. The 1020 is restored to its original coach/trailer configuration.

Nevada Copper Belt 21 (1910 100 hp) is stored "serviceable" at the California State Railroad Museum in Sacramento.

The body of Nevada Copper Belt 22 (ex Salt Lake & Utah 503 1913 150 hp) is at the Nevada State Railroad Museum in Carson City.

== Products ==
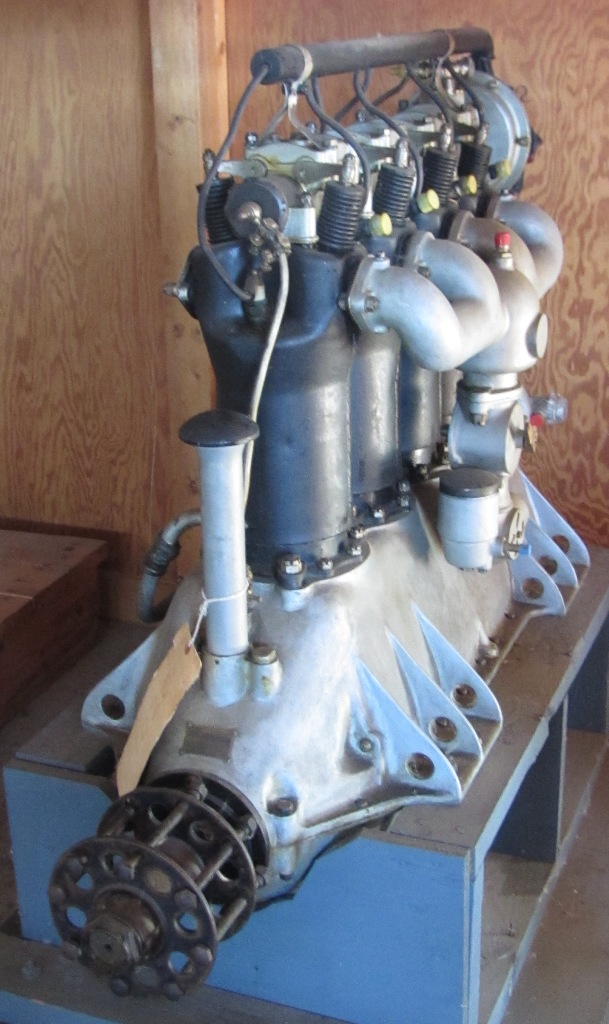
Hall-Scott L-4

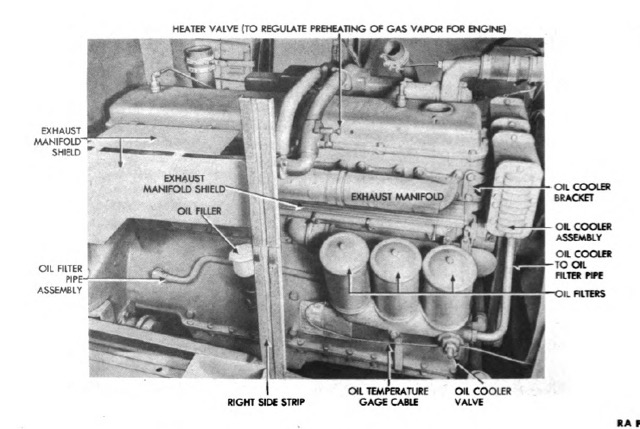
Hall-Scott 440

=== Aircraft engines ===
Model name	Configuration	Power
Hall-Scott A-1	I4	40 hp
Hall-Scott A-2	V8	60 hp
Hall-Scott A-3	V8	80 hp
Hall-Scott A-4	V8	100 hp
Hall-Scott A-5	I6	165 hp
Hall-Scott A-7	I4	100 hp
Hall-Scott A-8	V12	~450 hp
Hall-Scott L-4	I4	125 hp
Hall-Scott L-6	I6	200 hp

=== Automotive engines ===
Model name	Configuration	Power
Hall-Scott 400	I6	
Hall-Scott 440	I6	
Hall-Scott 504	I6	
Hall-Scott 590	I6	
Hall-Scott 190-2	I6	240

=== Marine engines ===
Model name	Configuration	Power
Hall-Scott Invader	I6	
Hall-Scott Defender	V12	

== See also ==
- Hunt Boat Company Rescue Boats that used Hall-Scott Invader Marine Engine.
