= Dumbo (air-sea rescue) =

Code name used by the United States Navy

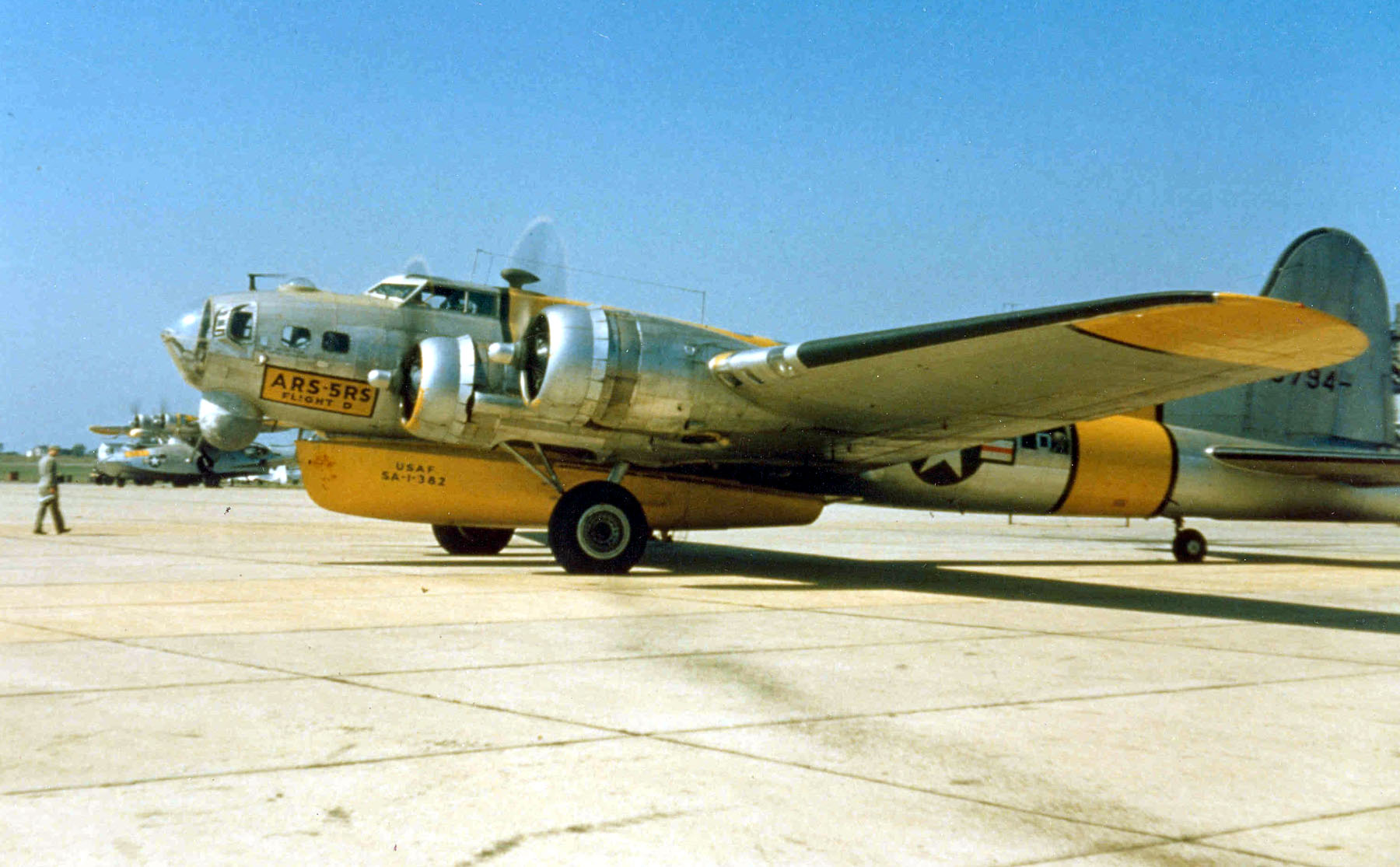
USAF Air Rescue Service Boeing SB-17G, an air-sea rescue variant of the B-17 Flying Fortress

Dumbo was the code name used by the United States Navy during the 1940s and 1950s to signify search and rescue missions, conducted in conjunction with military operations, by long-range aircraft flying over the ocean. The purpose of Dumbo missions was to rescue downed American aviators as well as seamen in distress. Dumbo aircraft were originally land-based heavy bomber aircraft converted to carry an airborne lifeboat to be dropped in the water near survivors. The name "Dumbo" came from Walt Disney's flying elephant, the main character of the animated film Dumbo, appearing in October 1941.

By extension, "Dumbo" became the unofficial nickname for any air-sea rescue aircraft, including flying boats that had less need to drop heavy lifeboats since the aircraft could land on the water and perform rescues directly. "Dumbo" was also an unofficial nickname for any variant of the PBY Catalina patrol bomber which operated in a wide variety of roles including anti-submarine warfare against German U-boats in the Battle of the Atlantic.

After the 1950s with development and greatly increased use of helicopters for air-sea rescue operations, the Dumbo aircraft were retired and the term was no longer used.

== History ==
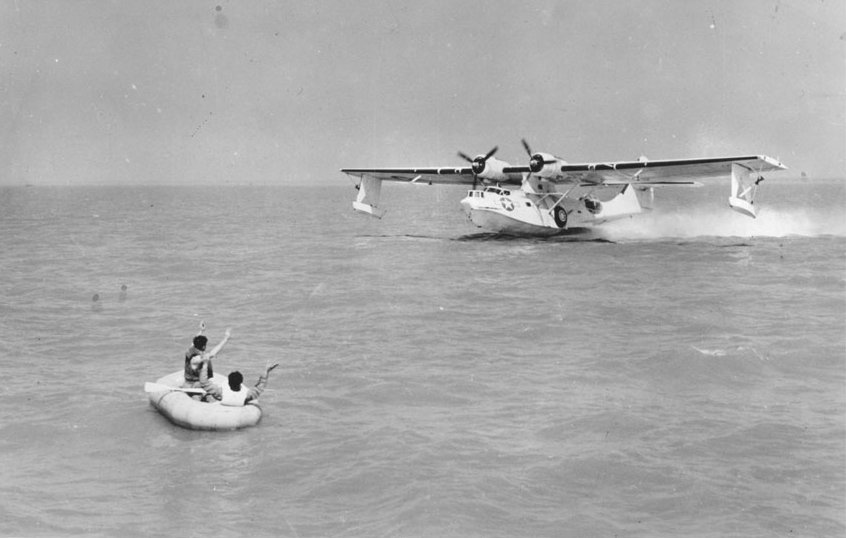
A USAAF Consolidated OA-10A Catalina (Army Air Forces designation of the Navy PBY) amphibious flying boat landing in waters off Keesler Field, Mississippi during a training exercise with U.S. Marine Corps rescue boat crews in 1944

Air-sea rescue by flying boat or floatplane was a method used by various nations before World War II to pick up aviators or sailors who were struggling in the water. Training and weather accidents could require an aircrew to be pulled from the water, and seaplanes were occasionally used for that purpose. A limitation of flying boats and floatplanes was that if the water's surface were too rough, the aircraft would not be able to land; in those instances the most that could be done was to drop emergency supplies to the survivors.

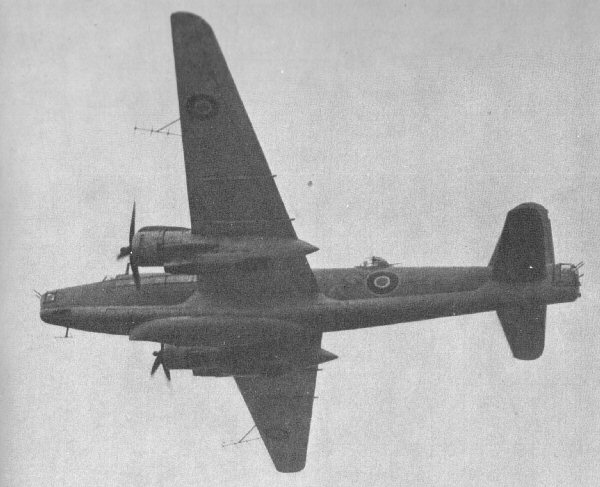
RAF Coastal Command Vickers Warwick ASR (air-sea rescue) aircraft with a droppable airborne lifeboat under the fuselage

The first air-dropped lifeboat was British, a 32-foot (10 m) wooden canoe-shaped model designed in 1943 by Uffa Fox to be dropped by Avro Lancaster heavy bombers for the rescue of aircrew downed in the Channel. The lifeboat's descent to the water was slowed by parachutes. In the United States, Andrew Higgins evaluated the Fox boat and found it too weak to survive mishap in emergency operations. In November 1943, Higgins assigned engineers from his company to make a sturdier version that would right itself if it landed upside down. Higgins Industries, known for making landing craft (LCVPs) and PT boats, produced a 1½-ton (1400 kg), 27-foot (8 m) airborne lifeboat with two engines and waterproof internal compartments so that it would not sink if swamped or overturned. Intended to be dropped by modified Boeing B-17 Flying Fortress bombers, it was ready for production in early 1944.

After wartime experiences suggested improvements, Consolidated PBY Catalina aircraft were given extra features to augment their air-sea rescue capability. One such invention was a small platform that could be braced against the side of the flying boat's hull to allow a team of two Catalina crewmen to lean out into the water and rescue a swimmer.

== Operations ==
Dumbo aircraft were sent aloft to patrol likely areas where American airmen might ditch. The Dumbo would radio the position of any survivors spotted in the water, and one or more actions could take place. The Dumbo, if a flying boat configuration, could land and pick up the survivors, or it could drop emergency supplies such as a lifeboat, by parachute. A nearby ship or submarine could be requested to come rescue the survivors, or an air-sea rescue station could be signaled to send a rescue boat.

Air-droppable lifeboats included the EDO A-3 lifeboat with an inboard motor, fuel, water and food; or a Higgins airborne A-1 lifeboat; both required parachutes to slow their descent. As well, inflatable life rafts could be dropped without a parachute.

In the face of vigorous enemy opposition, Dumbo missions sometimes required friendly units such as fighter aircraft to suppress enemy fire during the rescue attempt. In other cases, the mere presence of an armed Dumbo aircraft was enough to keep weaker enemy forces from engaging.

=== World War II ===
From the start of hostilities in World War II, air-sea rescues by flying boats were not unknown, though they were incidental to the aircraft's stated mission. In the Pacific Ocean theater, the first purposely assigned rescue aircraft, a PBY Catalina, was given the mission of plucking downed airmen from the ocean. From January to August 1943, such rescue flights based at Guadalcanal saved 161 aviators.

Beginning in November 1943, during the Gilbert and Marshall Islands campaign, American submarines were tasked with the rescue of U.S. Navy and Marine airmen downed during aircraft carrier attack operations. Submarines were often vectored to a rescue site by aircraft providing coordinates, but too many layers of command slowed the cooperation considerably. Long-range naval patrol aircraft were fitted with extra radio equipment to allow direct contact with surface and underwater units. By the end of 1944, some 224 airmen had been rescued by submarine.

In the last eight months of World War II, Dumbo operations complemented simultaneous United States Army Air Forces heavy bombing operations against Japanese targets. On any large-scale bombing mission carried out by Boeing B-29 Superfortresses at least three submarines were posted along the air route, with Dumbo aircraft sent to patrol the distant waters and listen for emergency radio transmissions from distressed aircraft. At the war's final B-29 bombing mission on August 14, 1945, 9 land-based Dumbos and 21 flying boats covered a surface and sub-surface force of 14 submarines and 5 rescue ships.

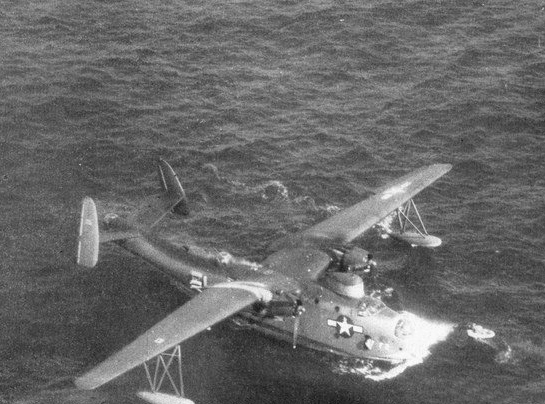
A Navy PBM Mariner flying boat rescues Lt. (jg) J. M. Denison, shot down while operating from the escort carrier USS Marcus Island (CVE-77) in 1945

Once Iwo Jima was taken by American forces, Dumbo missions had less distance to fly and could range closer to Japan, or remain on station for longer periods of time. After the Battle of Okinawa, distances were cut considerably and air-sea rescue missions observed a higher degree of success. From April to August 1945, the percentage of survivors rescued was higher than at any other point in the war. Squadrons assigned Martin PBM Mariner flying boats made a significant contribution beginning in April. Flying boat rescues sometimes took place while under fire from enemy shore batteries, and on a few rare occasions from within an enemy-held harbor.

Not all Dumbo operations were successful. Some Dumbo aircraft were lost to enemy action, weather or mechanical trouble, and some friendly fighter aircraft were shot down attempting to suppress enemy fire during a rescue. During one attempted rescue, a P-51 Mustang fighter pilot was taken prisoner by Japanese motor torpedo boats which fired at and drove away both the rescue submarine and the Dumbo aircraft. During another rescue, a fighter pilot clambered aboard the Higgins lifeboat that was dropped to him but was subsequently killed by fire from the shore of Chichijima 100 yards (90 m) away.

In July 1945, a PBY Catalina Dumbo aircraft helped rescue distressed crewmen of the torpedoed cruiser USS Indianapolis. Airmen dropped rafts and supplies, but noticed that some of the more than 300 men in the water were being attacked by sharks. The pilot, Lieutenant Adrian Marks, defied regulations forbidding him to land in heavy seas and brought his flying boat to a rough landing amid 12-foot (4 m) swells. He and his crew filled the fuselage with sailors, then began using parachute cord to lash more survivors to the top of the aircraft's wing, damaging it severely. With the arrival of the destroyer USS Cecil J. Doyle, Marks and his crew were rescued along with the 56 sailors they saved. The unflyable Catalina was sunk by gunnery from the Doyle the next morning. Marks was later awarded the Air Medal for this heroic action.

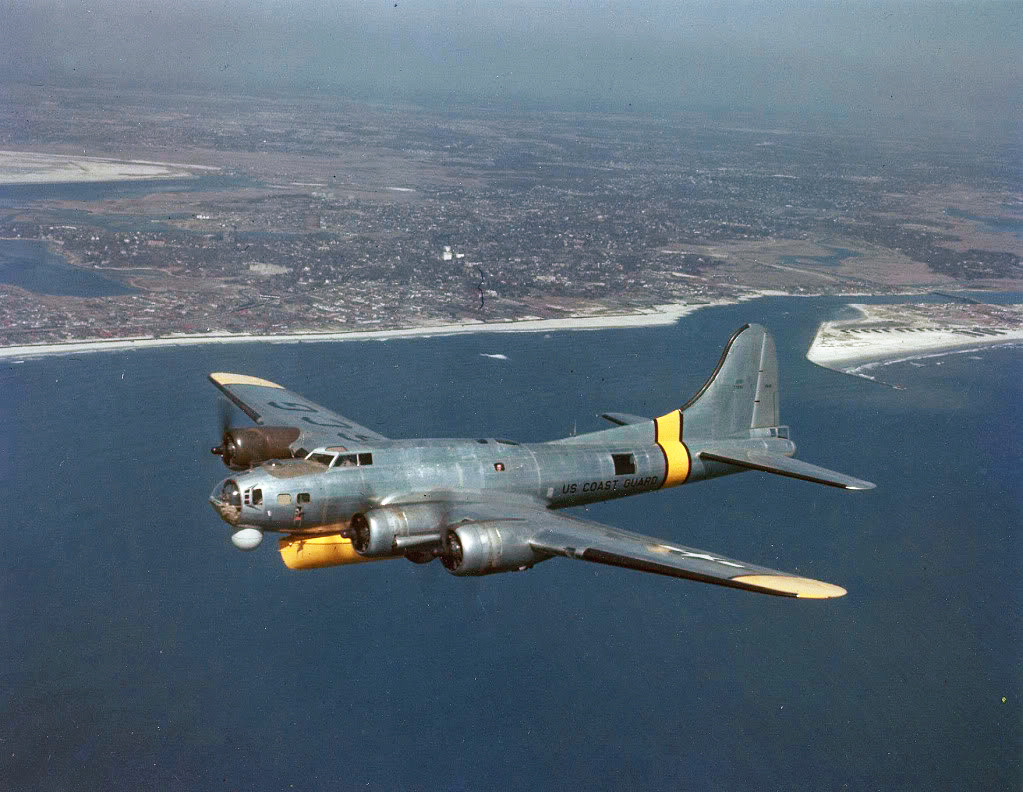
U.S. Coast Guard PB-1G search and rescue plane in flight, 1946

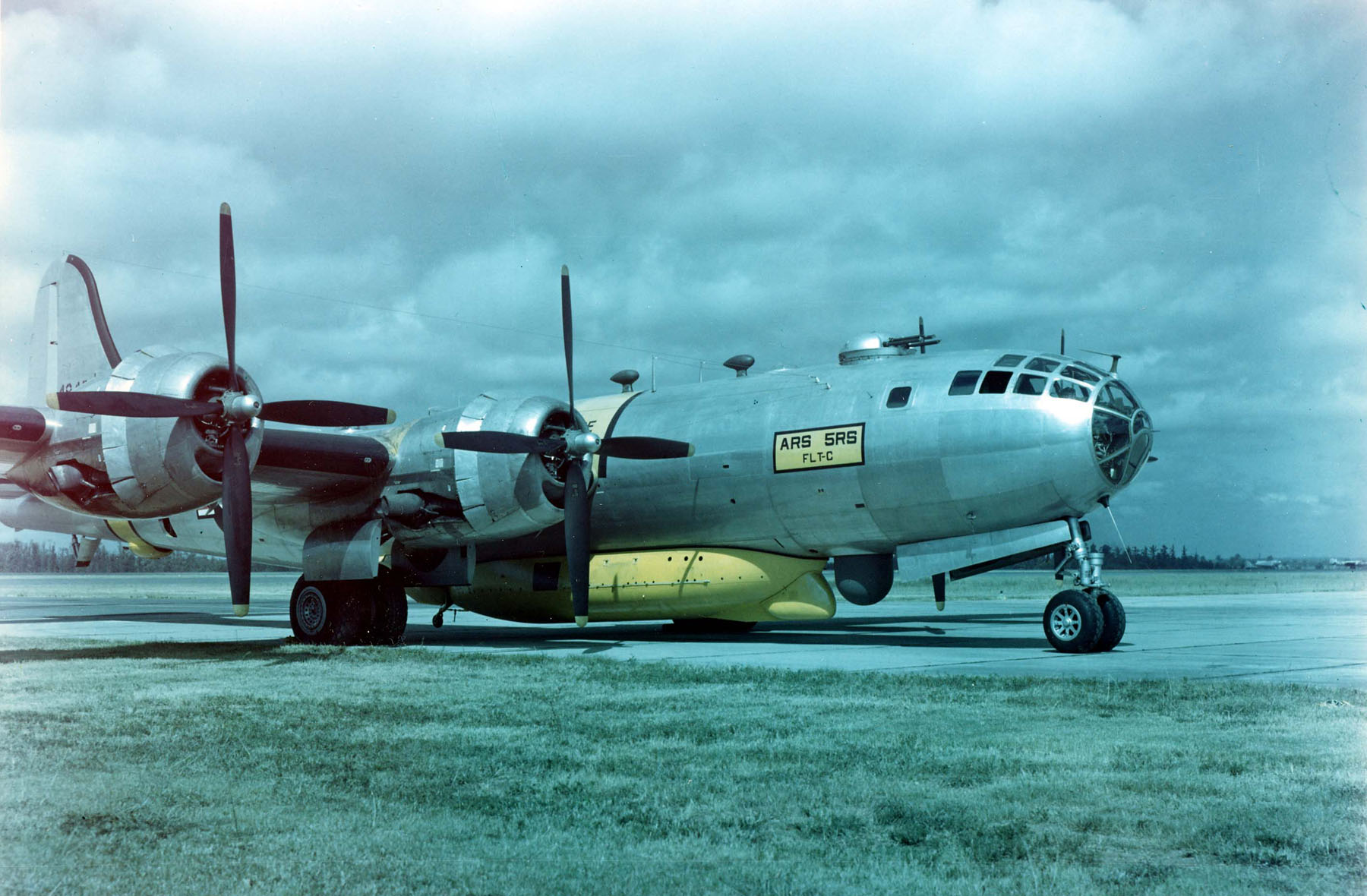
SB-29 "Super Dumbo", a post-World War II variant of the B-29 Superfortress, with an air-droppable EDO A-3 lifeboat rigged underneath

=== Korean War ===
After World War II, sixteen B-29 bombers were converted for air–sea rescue duty and redesignated SB-29, nicknamed "Super Dumbo". The first SB-29s were received by the Air Rescue Service in February 1947. The SB-29 served through the Korean War and into the mid-1950s.

=== Coast Guard ===
The United States Coast Guard operated Dumbo flights along the West Coast of the United States in the late 1940s and early 1950s with the PB-1G, a B-17 variant; eighteen B-17Gs were set aside by the USAAF in 1946 for transfer via the U.S. Navy to the Coast Guard to be used as search and rescue aircraft. Such a flight is depicted briefly in the 1954 film The High and the Mighty.
