= A-1 lifeboat =

Powered lifeboat for air drop deployment

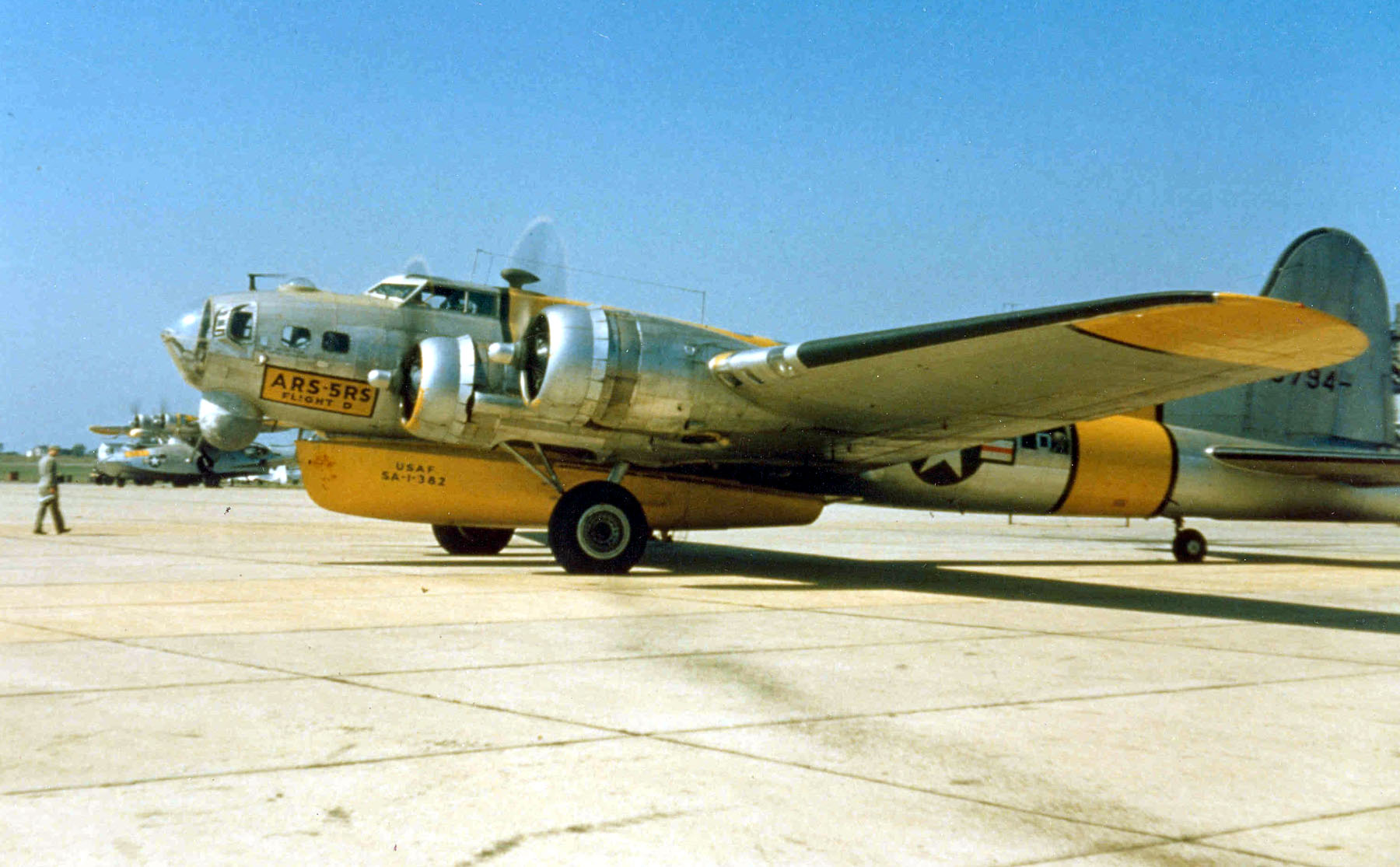
A Boeing SB-17G, an air-sea rescue aircraft modified to carry the A-1 lifeboat

The A-1 lifeboat was a powered lifeboat that was made to be dropped by fixed-wing aircraft into water to aid in air-sea rescue operations. The sturdy airborne lifeboat was to be carried by a heavy bomber specially modified to handle the external load of the lifeboat. The A-1 lifeboat was intended to be dropped by parachute during Dumbo missions to land within reach of the survivors of an accident on the ocean, specifically airmen survivors of an emergency water landing.

== Design ==
The first airborne lifeboat was designed in the United Kingdom by Uffa Fox in 1943 and used from February 1943. In the United States, Andrew Higgins evaluated the Fox boat and found it too weak to survive mishap in emergency operations. In November 1943, Higgins assigned engineers from his company to make a sturdier version with two air-cooled engines. Higgins Industries, known for making landing craft (LCVP) and PT boats, produced the A-1 lifeboat, a 3,300-pound (1,500 kg), 27-foot (8 m) airborne lifeboat made of laminated mahogany with 20 waterproof internal compartments so that it would not sink if swamped or overturned. Intended to be dropped by modified Boeing B-17 Flying Fortresses, it was ready for production in early 1944.

The yellow-painted vessel was supplied with enough food, water and clothing for 12 survivors to last for about 20 days in the ocean. It was provided with sails kept relatively small so that inexpert operators could use them. A "Gibson Girl" survival radio was aboard with an antenna to be lifted up with a kite. Its two engines propelled the boat at 8 miles per hour (13 km/h); if just one were used the speed was 5 miles per hour (8 km/h). The effective cruising range was about 1,500 miles (2,400 km) with some 100 to 150 miles (160 to 240 km) made per day.

Higgins also produced a smaller 18-foot (5.5 m) version of the A-1 for the US Coast Guard that could be dropped by PBY Catalinas. This version was half the weight of the A-1. Unlike the larger version for the USAAF, the smaller Higgins air dropped lifeboat was designed to rescue only eight or fewer persons. While a November 1945 Popular Mechanics article states it was in USCG service there are few public references to this smaller version of the A-1.

== Operations ==
The Higgins A-1 lifeboat was to be dropped by an SB-17 traveling at an airspeed of 120 miles per hour (190 km/h) and an altitude of about 1,500 feet (500 m). Precisely as the aircraft passed directly over the rescue target the boat was to be released. The boat dropped free for a short distance, then static lines attached to the aircraft's bomb bay catwalk drew taut, pulling out three 48-foot (15 m) parachutes of a standard U.S. Army design. Under the open parachutes, the boat took on a 50° bow-downward angle and descended at a rate of 27 feet per second (8 m/s), or about 18 miles per hour (29 km/h). In a manner similar to Fox's airborne lifeboat, upon contact with seawater, rocket-projected lines were automatically sent out 200 yards (180 m) to each side to make it easier for survivors to reach the Higgins lifeboat. The parachutes settled into the water to create a sea anchor holding the boat steady while survivors worked to reach it. Inside the boat, the crew of the aircraft that dropped the lifeboat would have placed a map giving the approximate position of the boat and a recommended compass setting to take in order to facilitate rescue.

The first Higgins airborne lifeboat used in an emergency was dropped on March 31, 1945, in the North Sea, some 8 miles (13 km) offshore of the Dutch island of Schiermonnikoog. In the evening of March 30, a PBY Catalina landed in six-foot (2 m) swells to save the pilot of a downed P-51 Mustang, but one of the Catalina's engines lost its oil in the process, rendering the flying boat unable to take off. Darkness, distance, and poor visibility prevented the Catalina men from making contact with the Mustang pilot who drifted in a raft and was eventually taken prisoner of war. The next morning, a Vickers Warwick located the Catalina and dropped a Fox-designed airborne lifeboat nearby, but after being retrieved the lifeboat began to break up from repeatedly smashing against the Catalina in the increasingly heavy seas.

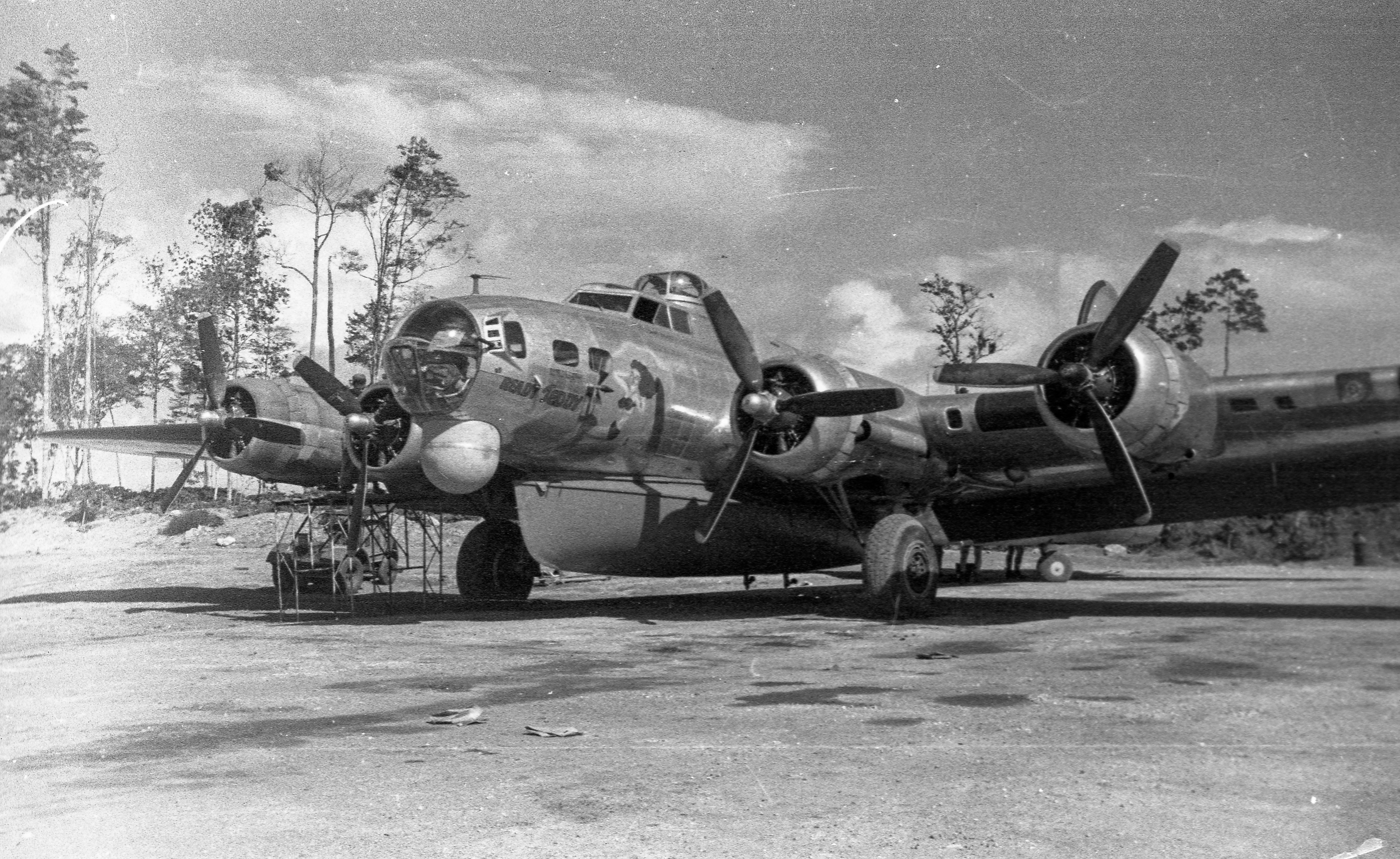
Boeing SB-17G "Ready Teddy," Morotai Island, 1945 (Courtesy of the City of Coffs Harbour, Accession Number mus07-8837).

Instead, the six aircrew lashed three of their own inflatable rubber dinghies together and abandoned the aircraft in ten-foot (3 m) swells. Another Warwick dropped another Fox airborne lifeboat some distance away, but its parachute didn't open and it was destroyed upon striking the water. An SB-17 flying in the 35-mile-per-hour (56 km/h), 40 °F (4 °C) breeze dropped its load—Higgins Airborne Lifeboat No. 25—from an altitude of 1,200 feet (370 m) to land about 100 feet (30 m) from the men. As it hit the water, one of the lifeboat's tethering rocket lines snaked out over the junction of two of the dinghies, making an ideal shot. The six airmen transferred to the Higgins lifeboat where they huddled down and waited for three days in the worst North Sea storm of 1945 before two more Fox airborne boats were dropped with gasoline and supplies on April 3, the lifeboats either swamping or breaking up upon hitting the water. On April 4 in continuing rough seas, the airmen were picked up by two Rescue Motor Launch (RML) boats, and the Higgins A-1 lifeboat, unable to be towed, was intentionally sunk by gunfire.

In the last eight months of World War II, Dumbo operations complemented simultaneous United States Army Air Forces heavy bombing operations against Japanese targets. On any one large-scale bombing mission carried out by Boeing B-29 Superfortresses, at least three submarines were posted along the air route, and Dumbo aircraft sent to patrol the distant waters where they searched the water's surface and listened for emergency radio transmissions from distressed aircraft. At the final bombing mission on August 14, 1945, 9 land-based Dumbos and 21 flying boats covered a surface and sub-surface force of 14 submarines and 5 rescue ships.

=== Coast Guard ===
The United States Coast Guard (USCG) operated Dumbo flights along the West Coast in the early 1950s, using the PB-1G, a B-17 variant. Such a flight is depicted briefly in the 1954 film The High and the Mighty. Further Dumbo flights were conducted jointly by the USCG and the U.S. Navy during the Korean War.

The A-1 lifeboat was joined and then succeeded by the A-3 lifeboat from 1947. The A-3 lifeboat was used until the mid-1950s, after which winch equipped helicopters had become commonplace enough to be used to lift survivors instead of dropping a lifeboat to them.
