= A-3 lifeboat =

US Air Force air drop lifeboat

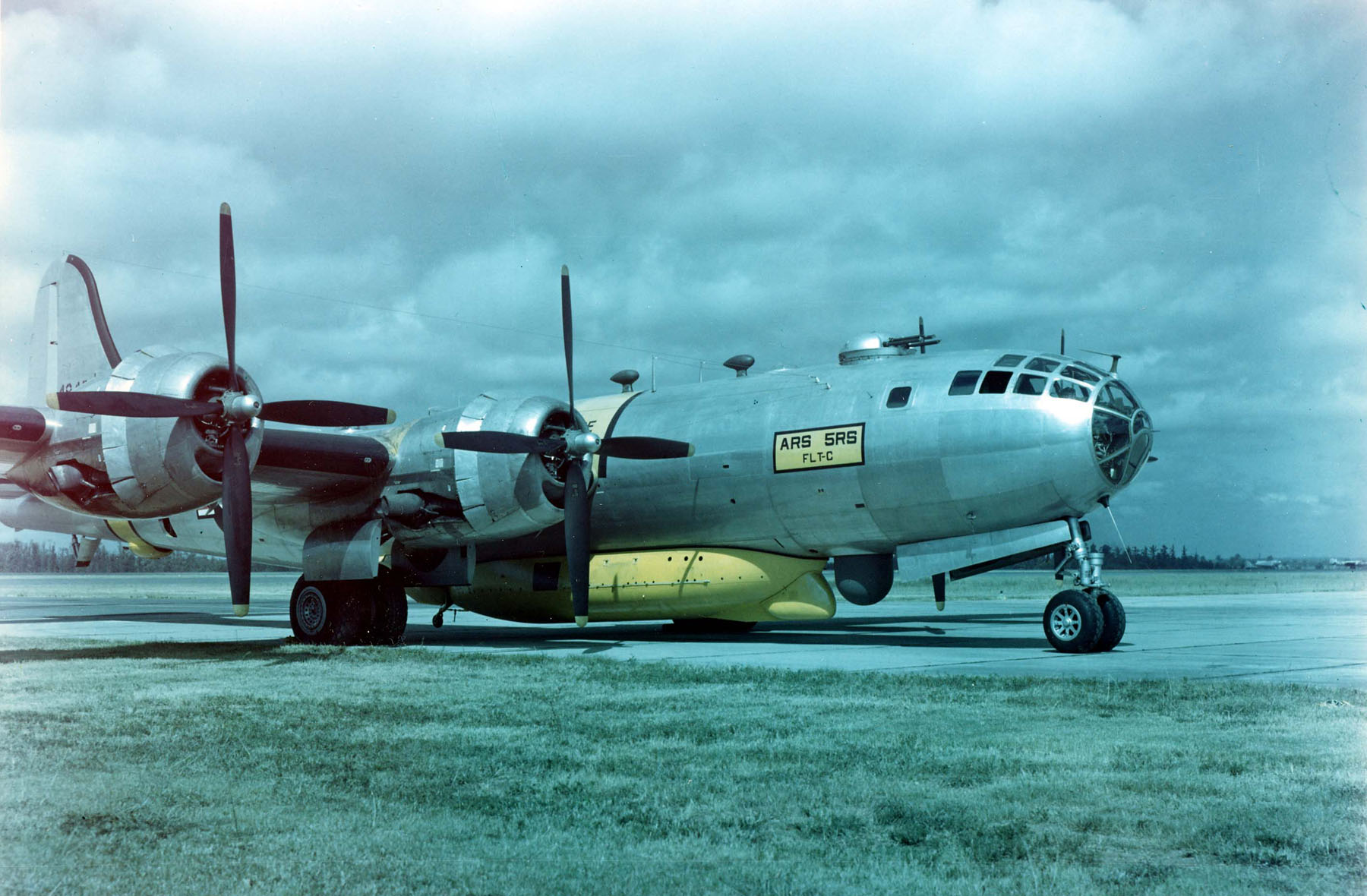
An SB-29 "Super Dumbo", a variant of the B-29 Superfortress, with an air-droppable EDO A-3 lifeboat rigged underneath

The A-3 lifeboat was an airborne lifeboat developed by the EDO Corporation in 1947 for the United States Air Force (USAF) as a successor to the Higgins Industries A-1 lifeboat. The A-3 lifeboat was a key element of "Dumbo" rescue flights of the 1950s.

== Specifications ==
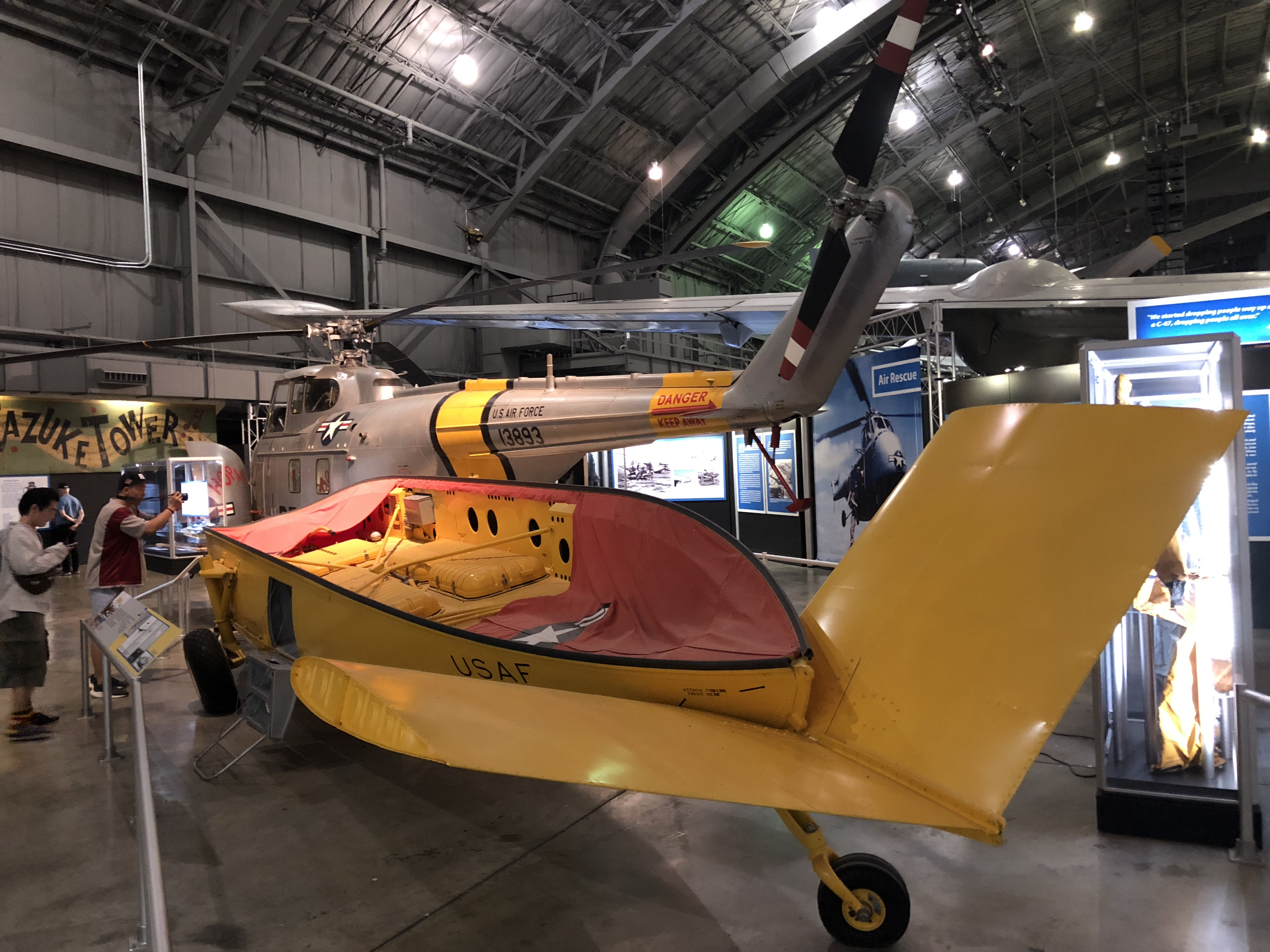
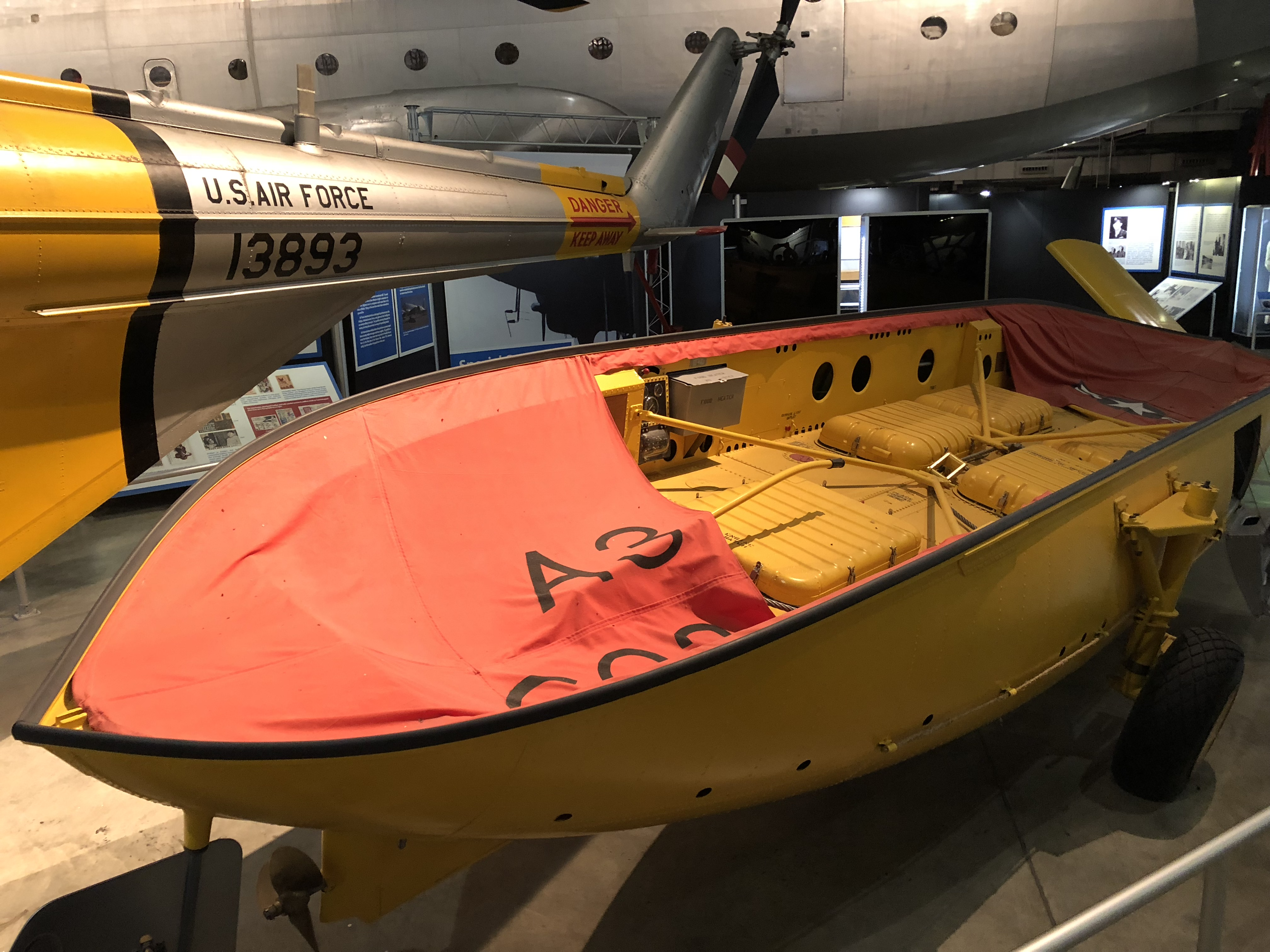
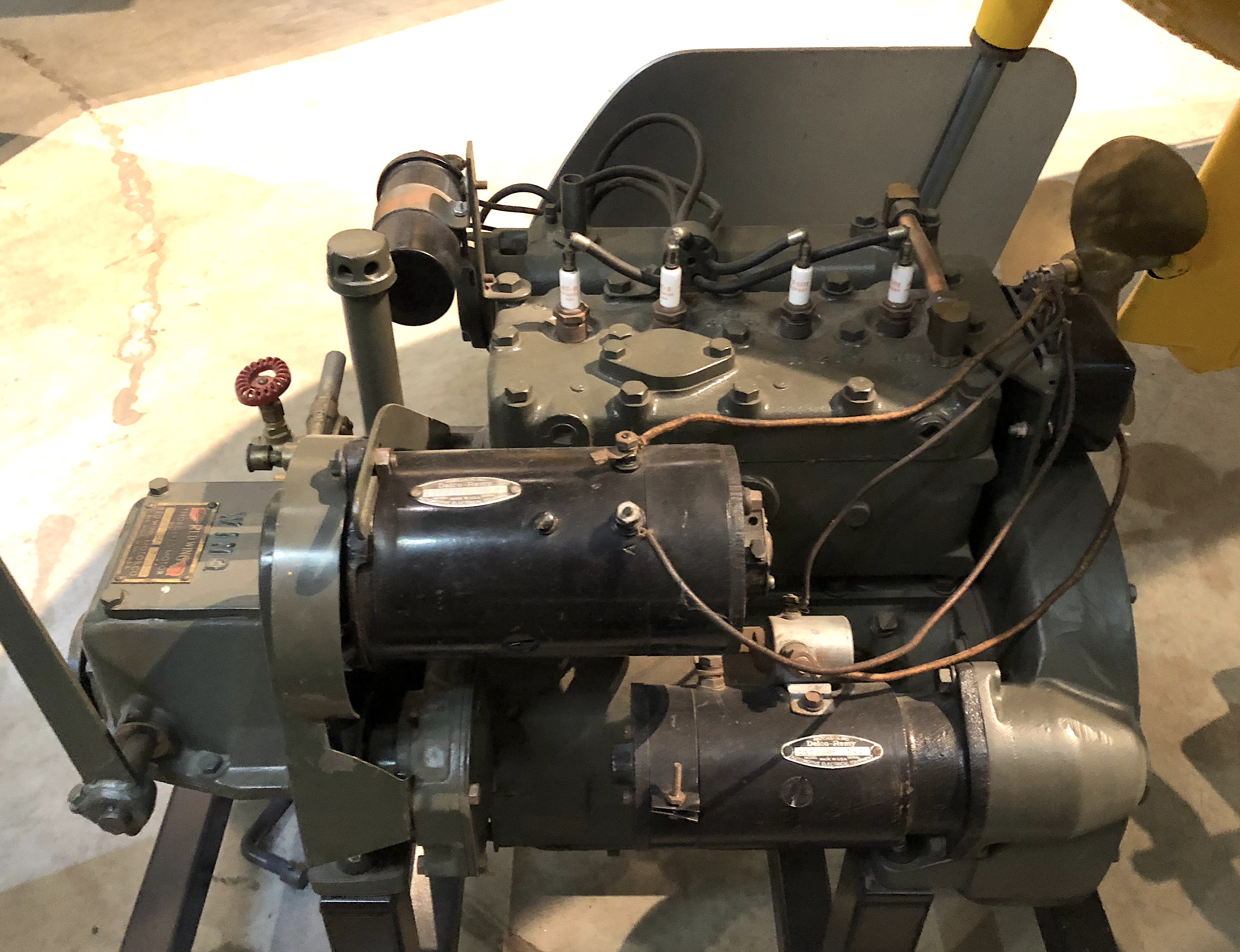
Edo A-3 Lifeboat restored and on display at the National Museum of the United States Air Force. At the right is the Red Wing Meteor "20" engine that propelled the craft at 8 knots.

EDO built the lifeboat of aluminum alloy to be carried by the SB-29 Super Dumbo performing air-sea rescue duties during the Korean War. Approximately 100 of these lifeboats were built—their serial numbers began at 501 and continued in sequence.

The A-3 lifeboat was 30.05 feet (9.16 m) long and it weighed 2,736 pounds (1,241 kg) when fully loaded and ready for attachment to the aircraft. The A-3 lifeboat could rescue 15 people. It was powered by a four-cylinder four-stroke Meteor 20 gasoline engine made by the Red Wing Motor Company. With an Ailsa Craig propeller it was expected to give a speed of 8 knots (9.2 mph) under calm water conditions. Nearly 100 US gallons (380 L) of fuel were on board. The airborne lifeboat was dropped from the SB-29 on a single 100-foot (30 m) parachute. Like previous airborne lifeboat designs, it was self-righting. The boat had a boarding ladder, and carried food and water for the rescued people.

In March 1951, Time magazine reported that the USAF was testing a radio controlled steering device for the A-3 lifeboat. After the boat dropped into the sea, a radio operator aboard the rescue aircraft would start the lifeboat's engine remotely, then direct the boat toward the survivors to make it easier for them to reach. After climbing aboard, the survivors could talk to the circling aircraft by two-way radio. A gyrocompass aboard the lifeboat would be set toward the nearest safe land, and the supply of fuel would allow for 800 miles (1,300 km) of range, with further range possible if additional water, food and fuel supplies were dropped along the way. The USAF expected all their A-3 lifeboats to be equipped with radio control by early 1952.

== World War II and Korean War ==
After World War II, sixteen Boeing B-29 Superfortress bombers were converted to carry the lifeboat and assigned rescue duty on a rotating basis, designated SB-29 in a role called "Super Dumbo". The first SB-29s were received by the Air Rescue Service in February 1947. They served in the Korean War where A-3 lifeboats were carried by Super Dumbos over the Yellow Sea and the Sea of Japan.

From the beginning of the Korean War, the A-3 lifeboat was kept shackled underneath an SB-29 waiting in constant readiness on the ground at each rescue airbase. Inside of the aircraft, however rainwater could enter the boat and pool within an open end of the deployment parachute's bag. After one air drop which failed because of water that had frozen at high altitude, trapping the parachute, the A-3 lifeboat was stored disconnected from the aircraft and with a rain cover in place.

Later in the Korean War, the USAF worked on improving the A-3 with a butterfly fin to stabilize the boat till the parachute opened, a full cover, enabling the drop aircraft to start the lifeboat's motor and steer it to the location of persons in the water, and other improvements. Whether any of these improved A-3s were built beyond the prototype and saw active use is unknown.

== Survivors ==
Lifeboat number 603 has been restored by the National Museum of the United States Air Force in Dayton, Ohio.

Lifeboat SN Unknown is displayed at the Pima Air & Space Museum in Tucson, Arizona.
