= LCPL =

World War II-era landing craft

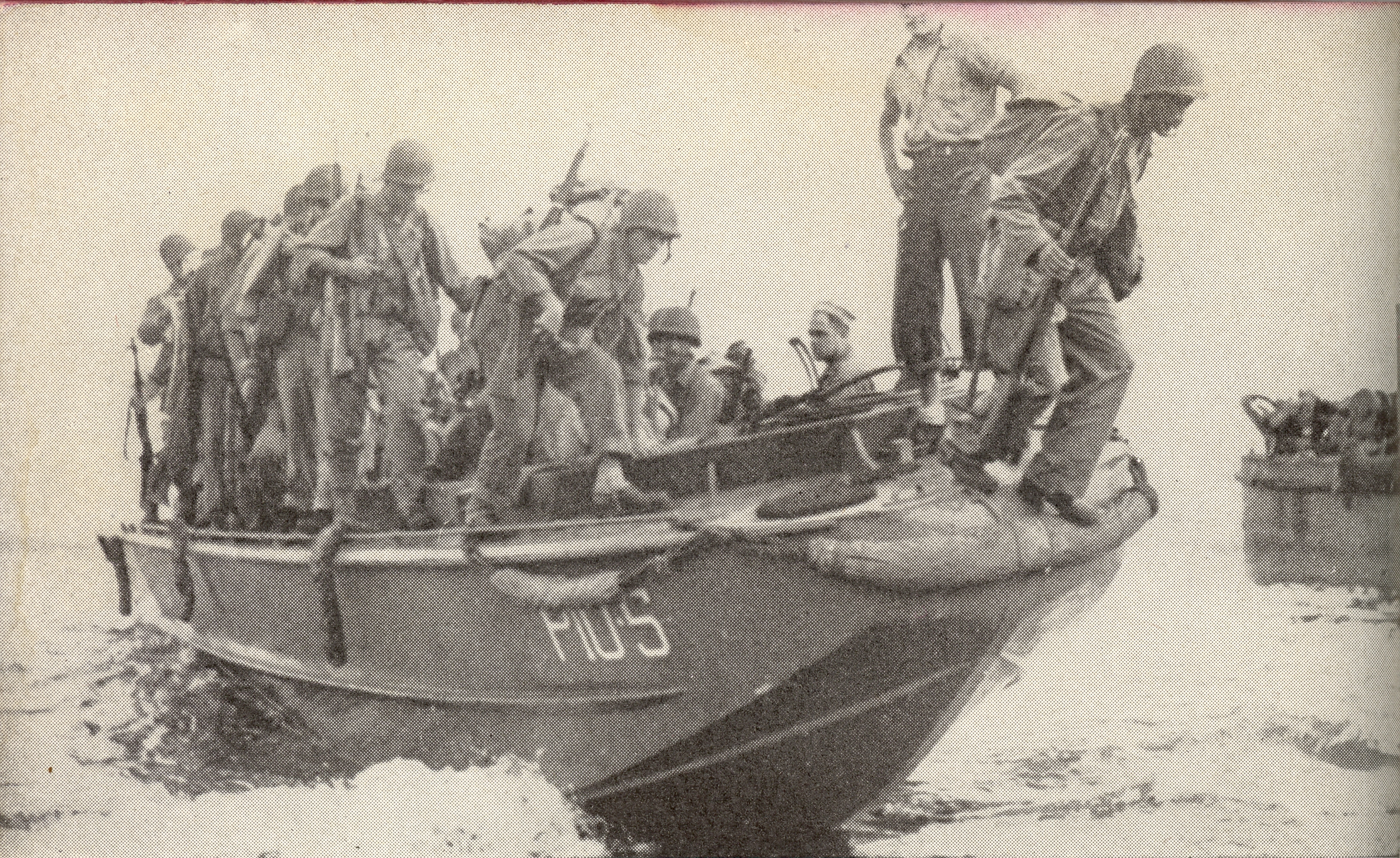
- United States Marine Corps reinforcements at Guadalcanal debark from an LCP(L).

Class overview
- Name: Landing Craft Personnel (Large)
- Builders: Higgins Industries, New Orleans, Louisiana, USA
- Operators: United States Navy; Royal Navy; Royal Canadian Navy; Royal Australian Navy; Royal New Zealand Navy; Royal Indian Navy; Polish Navy (postwar)
- Preceded by: Various ship's boats and cutters
- Succeeded by: LCP(R), LCVP
- Subclasses: Royal Navy model; US model
- Built: 1940-1943
- Active: 0
- Preserved: 0

General characteristics
- Type: Landing craft
- Displacement: US Model: 13,500 pounds (light), 21,600 pounds (loaded)
- Length: 36 ft 8 in
- Beam: 10 ft 10 in
- Draught: 2 ft 6 in aft. light; 3 ft 6 aft. loaded
- Ramps: 0
- Propulsion: 1 × Hall-Scott 250 hp gasoline engine; or 1 x Kermath 225 hp gasoline engine; or 1 x Gray 165-225 hp diesel engine; or 1 x Superior 150 hp diesel engine
- Speed: RN model: 9-11 kts. (max); US model: 8 kts. (fully loaded)
- Range: RN model: 120 miles at full speed (loaded); US model: 50 miles (gasoline), 130 miles (diesel)
- Capacity: 6,700–8,100 pounds (3,039–3,674 kg)
- Troops: RN model: 25 troops; US model: 36 troops
- Crew: US model: 4 - coxswain, engineer, signalman, and bow-hookman (last two also operated the machine guns); RN model: 3 - coxswain, stoker, bowman/machine gunner, plus 1 officer per group of 3 boats
- Armament: US model: 2 x Browning .30 cal. machine guns, or US manufactured Lewis .30 cal. machine guns RN model: 1 x .303 cal. Lewis Gun
- Armor: 3 x 10 lb. plates on bulkheads (fore of the .30 cal. cockpits, of the troop well and the engine space.
- Notes: from US Navy ONI 226 Allied Landing Craft and Ships, US Government Printing Office, 1944.

The Landing Craft Personnel (Large) or LCP (L) was a landing craft used extensively in the Second World War. Its primary purpose was to ferry troops from transport ships to attack enemy-held shores. The craft derived from a prototype designed by the Eureka Tug-Boat Company of New Orleans, Louisiana, USA. Manufactured initially in boatyards in and around New Orleans, as requirements grew it was produced in a number of yards around the United States. Typically constructed of pine planks and plywood, and fitted with some armor plate, this shallow-draft boat with a crew of 3 could ferry an infantry platoon of 36 to shore at 8 knots (13 km/h). Men generally entered the boat by walking over a gangplank from the boat deck of their troop transport as the LCP(L) hung from its davits. When loaded, the LCP(L) was lowered into the water. Soldiers exited the boat by jumping or climbing down from the craft's bow or sides.

== Origins ==
During the 1930s, the United States Marine Corps (USMC) sought boats practical for landing troops on beaches. In 1936, the USMC conducted experiments with new types of boats, lighters, and launches. Many craft were considered coming from the Navy's Bureau as well as commercial fishing boat designs. Included in these experiments were some prototypes where, upon beaching, a ramp was deployed over rollers on the bow. A few boats were overwhelmed by the surf and others did not prove practical, but the 28 feet (9 m) craft designed by the Eureka Tug-Boat Company of New Orleans was both a good sea boat and superior at beaching.

The craft was based on the company's 1926 spoonbill-bowed craft used by trappers in the bayous of the Mississippi River Delta. The boat's draft was rather shallow, 18 inches (46 cm), and it could cut through vegetation and slide over logs without ruining its propeller. It could also run up on shore and extract itself damage-free. As part of sales demonstrations, boats were often run up on the seawalls of Lake Pontchartrain. (The craft was also infamous among law enforcement along the Gulf Coast as a vehicle for rum-runners.)

The Marines' specifications at the time were for boats operated by a crew of 6 that could carry a squad of 12 men. Such boats should be able to achieve 15 knots (17 mph; 28 km/h), and to be hoisted on the US Navy's standard davits. The general lines of the boat were accepted by the USMC, and in September 1940 Andrew J. Higgins, president of the Eureka Tug-Boat Company, was contracted to build a slightly larger craft to carry 24 fully equipped troops, or two squads. He produced the 32 feet (10 m) Eureka or Higgins boat. This was the craft first used in American Fleet Landing Exercises in 1941.

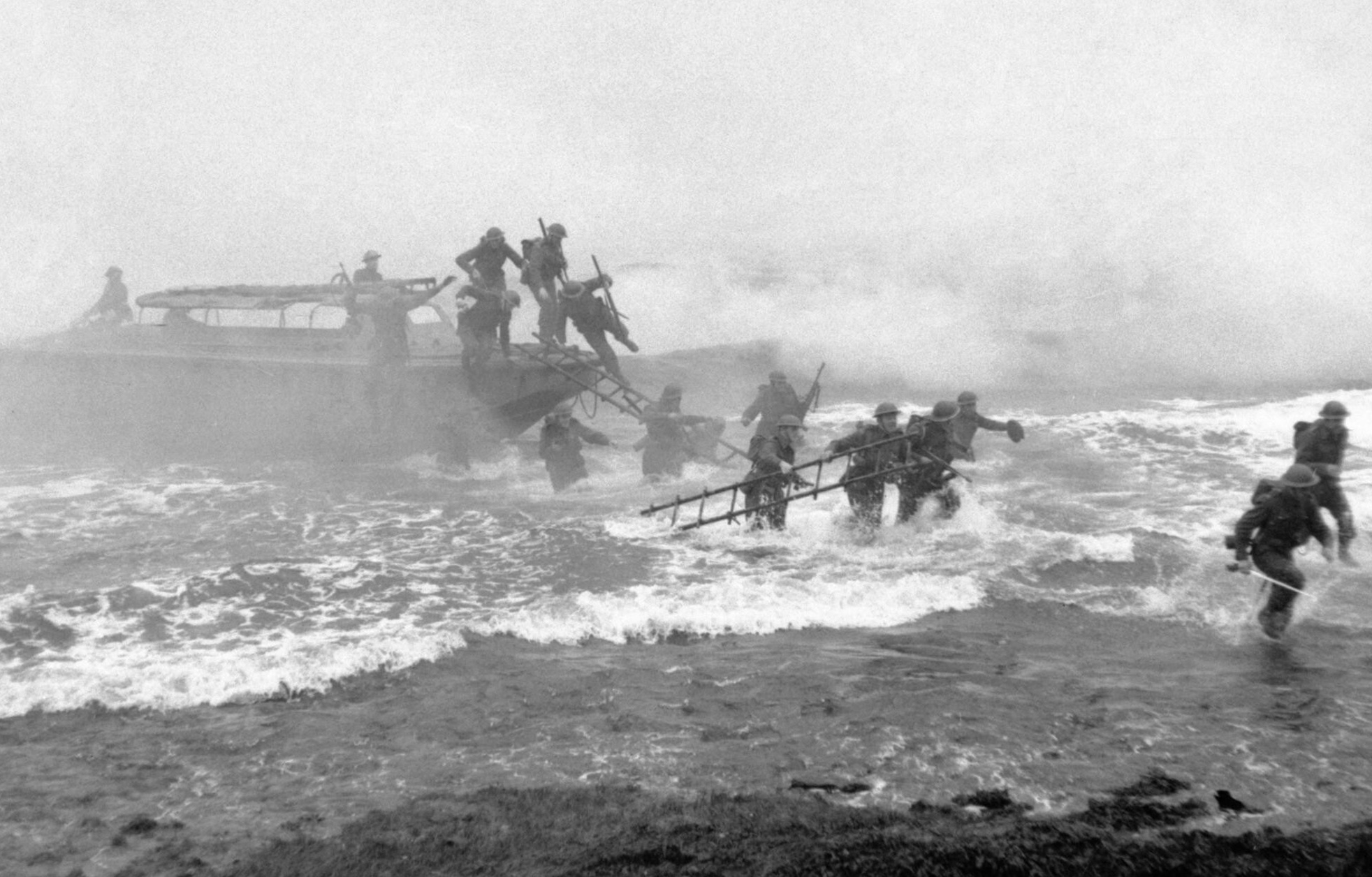
A Eureka Boat, an early model of the LCP(L), used in commando raids. This image features Jack Churchill leading a charge armed with a broadsword (far right).

Before the USMC received their boats, the British Admiralty’s need for a raiding craft brought the first enquiries for an even larger boat. Purchasing agents from Britain had become aware of Andrew Higgins’ Eureka boats; enquiries were made and a film of the Eureka was sent to the Admiralty in London. The German occupation of France had changed British procurement plans dramatically. The Admiralty's Inter-Service Training and Development Centre wanted a 36 ft 8 in (11.18 m) craft, intending the boat to carry a full British army platoon and two or three attached signallers or assault engineers. An initial order for 136 was placed, with the first 50 delivered to Britain in October 1940. Higgins had already built these boats on spec and is said to have preferred this larger craft. Further US procurements were of this larger boat, and thus the LCP(L) was the forerunner of all American LCP types.

The LCP(L)s were also known as Eurekas or R boats. Before 1942, The USMC referred to them as T Boats. They were American-made landing craft that could carry up to 36 troops. Unlike later landing craft, the LCP(L)s did not have ramps at the bow, so the troops had to jump over the sides to get out. The boats themselves were made of plywood but had armored bulkheads. They were invented by Louisiana native Andrew Higgins before the war and were designed with a shallow draft to operate in swamps. But, it turned out that the design was also excellent for operating on shallow beaches.

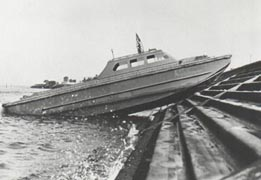
This boat, an early example from the Eureka Tug-Boat Company, was the progenitor of thousands of Second World War landing craft.

== Manning the LCP(L) ==
In US Navy or US Coast Guard service, the craft's crew comprised two gunners and the coxswain. Though the gunners would normally occupy the two gunner's cockpits, forward, during landing, they had other duties also. One acted as the bowman while the other served as the mechanic. The coxswain was in charge of the boat and crew. His position was at the wheel directly behind the gunner's cockpits and only slightly off-set to the port side. From here he steered and operated engine controls.

The craft's raked bow made beaching comparatively easy, and the craft came off without difficulty when unloaded, though it could snag on rocks or poor ground as any other small boat would. The LCP(L) could be loaded from the boat deck, before launching, "unless otherwise specified by the warning plate in the boat", for its construction as much as its light weight made this speeding up of the launching-load time possible. Other craft, especially those with a ramp like the LCV and LCVP, were structurally weak in the bow and could not be loaded before lowering from davits; personnel being transported in these types climbed down scramble nets into these boats.

The 3-man crew of a British LCP(L) was led by a Leading Seaman or Royal Marine Corporal coxswain who steered the boat and operated engine controls on the port side of the cockpit. Beside him was the Lewis gunner who also acted as bowman handling any rope-work forward. The third man was a mechanic who might also handle stern ropes. At other times LCP(L)s might be led or towed by coastal forces craft when a raid was within reasonable range of a sally port. A number of these raids were made in 1940 to 1942 by British forces, sometimes using LCP(L)s though more often going ashore by canoe. The first major landing from LCP(L)s in Europe took place in August 1942 when the Canadians with elements of the British army and Royal Marines landed at Dieppe. The fortunes of the LCP(L) flotillas showed here how units and even individual craft could have very different luck in a landing.

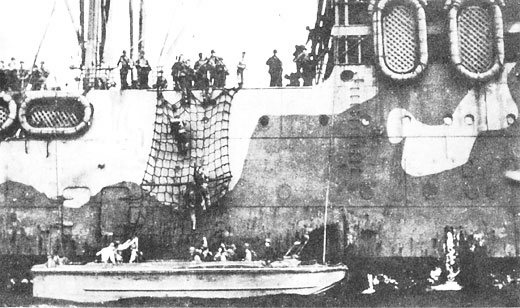
US Marines climb down a scramble net to an LCP(L) during preparations in the Fiji Islands for the Guadalcanal Campaign that would take place in August 1942. These men appear to be filling a returned craft as first-wave troops would have entered the boat prior to its being lowered to the water.

== Successors ==
Two significant further developments of the LCP(L) were produced, also designed by Andrew Higgins. These retained the dimensions of the LCP(L) to allow use from the same launch platforms. The first development was the Landing Craft, Personnel (Ramped) (LCP(R)), which added a bow ramp to the LCP(L) design for faster egress. The concept came from the Japanese Daihatsu-class ramped landing craft. The second development, the most-produced of the three, was the Landing Craft, Vehicle and Personnel (LCVP). This widened the bow to the full width of the craft to maximize the ramp size and speed of egress. The LCVP is the craft most referred to as a "Higgins Boat", although its two predecessors and a PT boat design were also developed and produced by Higgins.

== See also ==
- Gray Marine Engine
- Landing Craft Assault
- LCM (2)
- LCP(R)
- LCVP (United States)
- Landing Craft Mechanized
- Landing Ship, Infantry
