= Curtiss-Wright C-76 Caravan =

1940s American military transport aircraft

C-76 Caravan
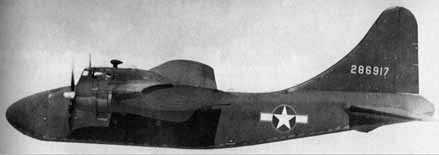

General information
- Type: Medium transport
- National origin: United States
- Manufacturer: Curtiss-Wright
- Status: Canceled
- Primary user: United States Army Air Forces
- Number built: 25 (11 prototypes, 5 production C-76, 9 revised YC-76A)

History
- First flight: 3 May 1943

The Curtiss-Wright C-76 Caravan (company designation CW-27) was an American all-wood military transport aircraft. The C-76 was intended as a substitute standard aircraft in the event of expected wartime shortages of light alloys. However, both prototype and production aircraft failed several critical flight and static tests, and after U.S. aluminum production proved sufficient for wartime defense requirements, orders for the C-76 were cancelled and it did not enter production. Although it did not go into its main production, 25 pre-production and prototype aircraft of various types were constructed during development. The factory where it might have been produced made more C-46 Commandoes for which the C-76 would have been a substitute.

== Design and development ==
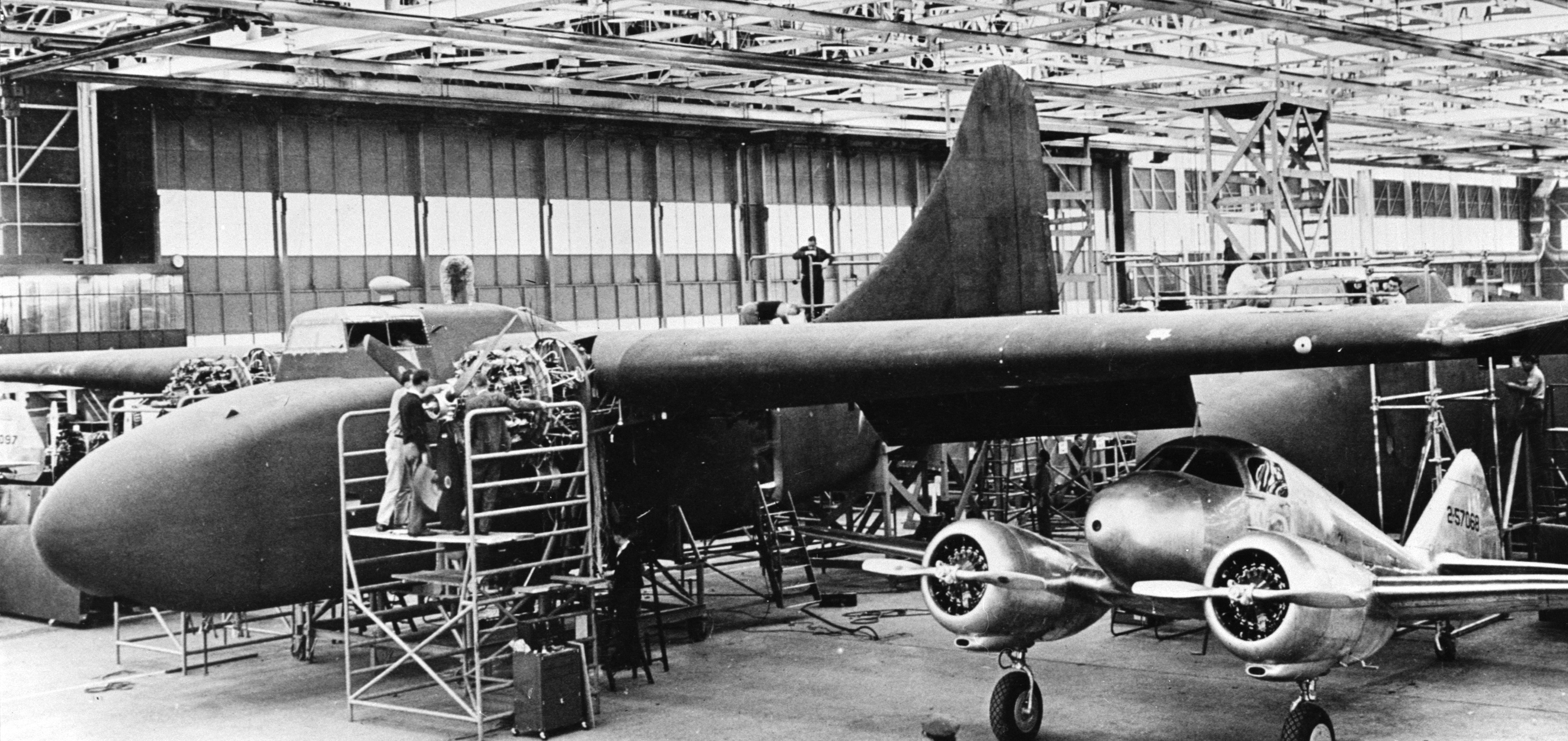
Curtiss AT-9 under C-76 Caravan's wing at Curtiss-Wright in 1943.

In 1941, Curtiss-Wright was contracted by the United States Army Air Forces to design and construct an all-wood military transport aircraft, with performance specifications meeting or exceeding that of the Douglas C-47 Skytrain then in service.

The Curtiss-Wright CW-27 was designed by Curtiss-Wright's chief designer George A. Page, Jr. as a high-wing, twin-engine, cargo transport aircraft, utilizing plywood construction with a tricycle undercarriage. Though the British de Havilland Mosquito had successfully employed a ply construction using a balsa wood core and birch hardwood exterior, Curtiss-Wright engineers, using research provided by Forest Products Laboratory, rejected this approach, insisting instead on a ply construction of dense mahogany, which greatly increased the plane's weight. At Curtiss' request, Army Materiel Command laid in large supplies of mahogany, and a number of furniture manufacturers, including the Baldwin Piano Company, were subcontracted to build components for the aircraft, which would be assembled at Curtiss-Wright's new defense plant in Louisville, Kentucky.

A radial engine was mounted on each wing, and the aircraft was capable of carrying 23 personnel or a cargo payload. The Caravan had a nose section that swung out to the right to enable outsize loading, including a jeep or small artillery pieces.

The original contract called for 11 YC-76 preproduction aircraft, and the first aircraft would be built and tested at Curtiss-Wright's St. Louis, Missouri Division plant. Subsequently, orders for five C-76 production aircraft and nine revised YC-76As were placed by the USAAF, with line production to commence at the Curtiss-Wright plant in Louisville as well as a Higgins Aircraft Michoud Factory Field in Michoud near New Orleans, Louisiana. To keep the plywood flexible during construction the factory was kept hot and damp. The prototype YC-76 first flew on 1 May 1943.

Only five production aircraft were completed in 1943: three from Curtiss-Wright's St. Louis Division, and two from a new plant at Louisville, Kentucky, which was finished in May 1942. The Higgins Aircraft Co. contract was cancelled by the Army on 3 August 1943 before the Higgins factory in New Orleans had been completed, and Higgins was awarded another contract to produce the C-46 Commando.

== Operational history ==
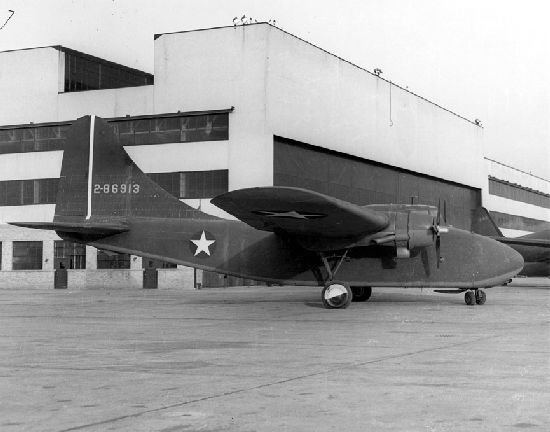
The YC-76

The first flight of the YC-76 prototype took place on 3 May 1943. The C-76 proved severely underpowered from the start, with a cruising speed of 160 mph (260 km/h), a service ceiling of 22,600 feet (6,900 m), a range of only 750 mi (1,210 km), and a cargo capacity of under 8,000 lb (3,600 kg). Colonel J.W. Sessums, a USAAF officer at the Air Materiel Command at Wright Field, later related:

'The first flight [of the C-76] was made and the airplane was very heavy. It developed some serious vibrations. In fact, the pilot was awful glad to make a quick circuit to get back on the ground ... two of the Curtiss test pilots took it out on a flight and the Army requested that our project officer on the airplane be allowed to fly along on this trip. The Curtiss Company refused. We were very glad that they refused because on this second flight, it [the C-76] flew apart and the pilots were lost and so was the plane.

Compared to other cargo aircraft then coming into service, the C-76 was already obsolescent, even allowing for its war-priority method of construction. In addition, the C-76 failed a number of critical flight tests. It was discovered in testing that the C-76 was unstable when not carrying a cargo load; in order to obtain a stable center of gravity, the plane had to be ballasted beyond its maximum permissible gross takeoff weight. At any speed, or in any gusting wind, the C-76's elevators would flap back and forth violently. The wing structure failed in eight separate static tests, sometimes with a load as low as 40% of the wing's rated capacity. The wing failures were attributed by some sources to the failure of the fasteners used to secure the wood components of the aircraft. Numerous additional fasteners, metal stirrups, and wood ply reinforcements were added to the structure in an effort to strengthen it, thereby increasing the plane's overall weight. At the Louisville plant, Curtiss line workers would later recall two C-76 production planes that were kept for some time in the assembly building, with one plane cannibalized to keep the other in flyable condition.

On 10 May 1943, the first YC-76 constructed at the Louisville, Kentucky plant, 42-86918, lost its tail unit, due to a lack of securing bolts, during a test flight, crashing at Okolona, Kentucky, killing three Curtiss-Wright test crew, Sanford Shubiner, Robert Scudder, and John Trowbridge.

As war priority measures designed to increase aluminum production proved successful, the feared shortage of light alloys never materialized. Moreover, USAAF Training Command had begun to forward widespread complaints of insufficient service life on their wooden-winged Fairchild PT-19 primary trainers when exposed to high heat in training bases located in Texas and Florida. The War Department cancelled its orders for the C-76 on 3 August 1943. The Sara Clark Collection, National Archives, Record Group 342, Box 2719, document the disposition of the 25 YC-76 aircraft as Articles #1, #3, # 4, and #5 were placed in the "Z" category, ZC-76, due to the poor gluing conditions and assembly procedures by subcontractors found through a Material Division inspection of the subcontractors work. These aircraft were assigned to the Technical Training Command and used for ground purposes only. Article #2 was destroyed in static testing at Wright Field. Article #6 was lost in a crash. Article #9 was under repair, but repairs were stopped and the airplane placed in Class 26, non-operational status. Air Service Command operated 12 YC-76s on a service test basis for nine months and found that they required excessive man hours to maintain. It was suggested that these be placed into Class 26 or Survey.

The final disposition of the aircraft as of 1 October 1945, by letter of the Air Technical Service Command; 1-Washout upon delivery from factory, 5-Class 26, 10-Survey, 1-Condemned, 8-Reconstruction Finance Corp. to be sold as surplus. In the interim, the Curtiss-Wright plants at Buffalo, New York and Louisville, Kentucky went over to full production of the Curtiss C-46 Commando. USAAF Materiel Command later estimated the entire C-76 project cost the U.S. government $400 million and several months in lost production time.

== Variants ==
YC-76
Prototypes, 11 built.
C-76
Production aircraft built at St Louis, five built.
YC-76A
Production variant, nine built.
C-76A
Production variant, order for 175 cancelled, none built.

== Specification ==
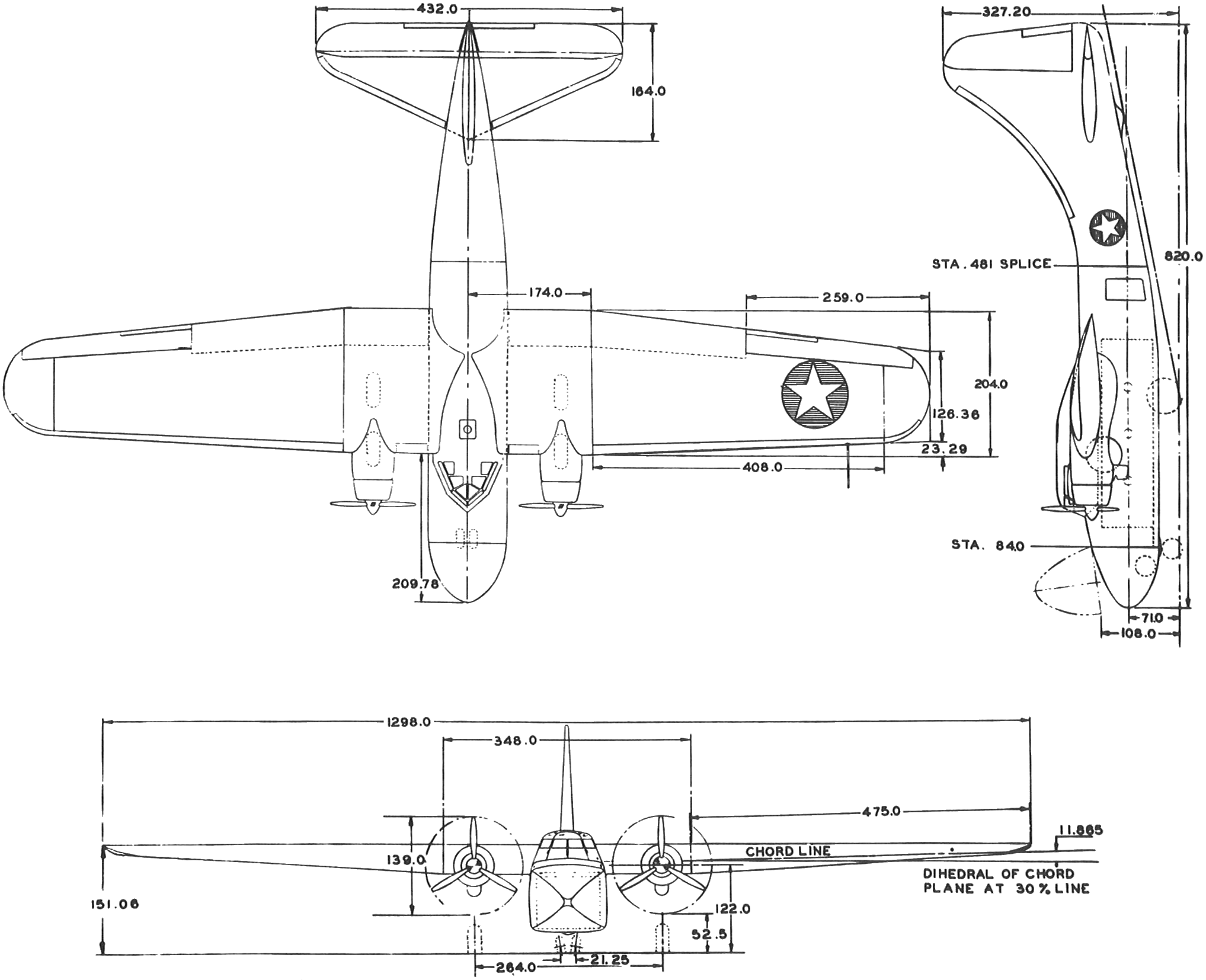
3-view line drawing of the Curtiss-Wright C-76 Caravan

Data from Curtiss Aircraft 1907–1947

General characteristics

- Crew: 3
- Capacity: 45 troops
- Length: 68 ft 4 in (20.83 m)
- Wingspan: 108 ft 2 in (32.97 m)
- Height: 27 ft 3 in (8.31 m)
- Wing area: 1,560 sq ft (145 m^{2})
- Empty weight: 18,300 lb (8,301 kg)
- Gross weight: 28,000 lb (12,701 kg)
- Powerplant: 2 × Pratt & Whitney R-1830-92 Twin Wasp 14-cylinder, 1,200 hp (890 kW) each
- Propellers: 3-bladed constant-speed propellers

Performance

- Maximum speed: 192 mph (309 km/h, 167 kn) at 7,300 ft (2,200 m)
- Range: 750 mi (1,210 km, 650 nmi)
- Service ceiling: 22,600 ft (6,900 m)
- Time to altitude: 10,000 ft (3,000 m) in 12 minutes 30 seconds

== See also ==
Aircraft of comparable role, configuration, and era

- Hughes H-4 Hercules (another all-wood transport aircraft developed in WW2, the "Spruce Goose")
- De Havilland Mosquito (British all wood WW2 aircraft nicknamed the "Wooden Wonder")

Related lists

- List of military aircraft of the United States
