= Airborne lifeboat =

Lifeboat dropped by an aircraft to assist in rescue operations

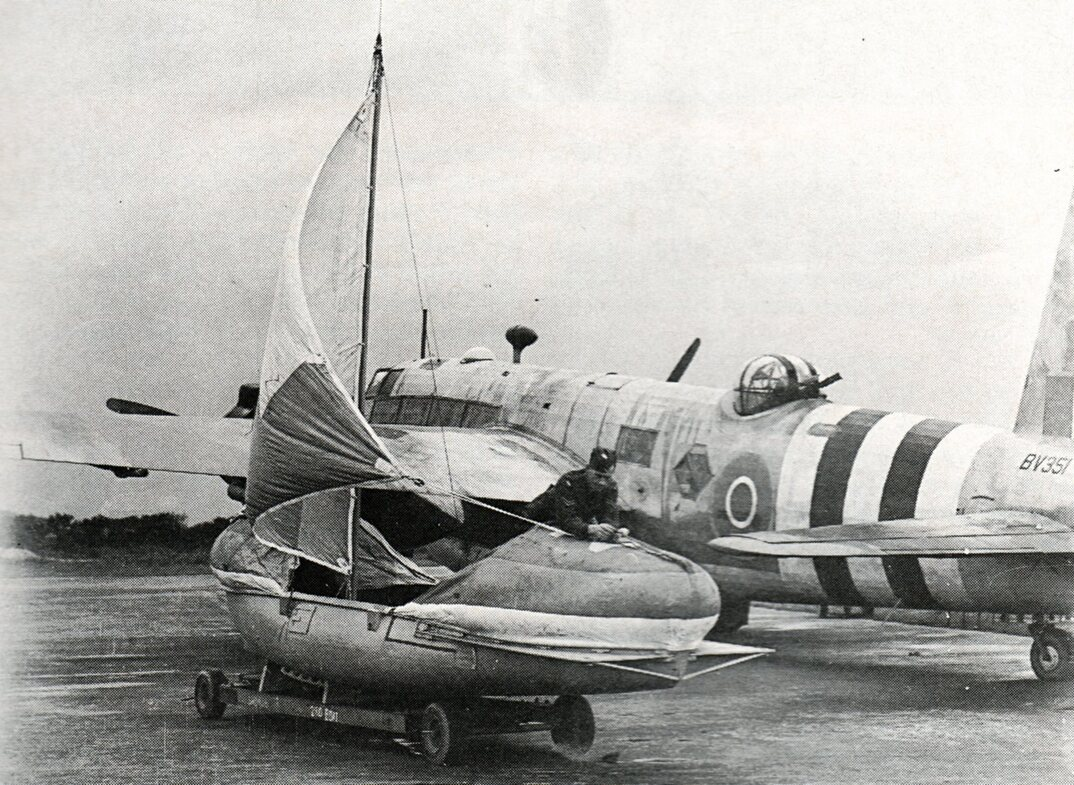
A British, Uffa Fox-type airborne lifeboat, shown rigged for sailing, in front of a Vickers Warwick

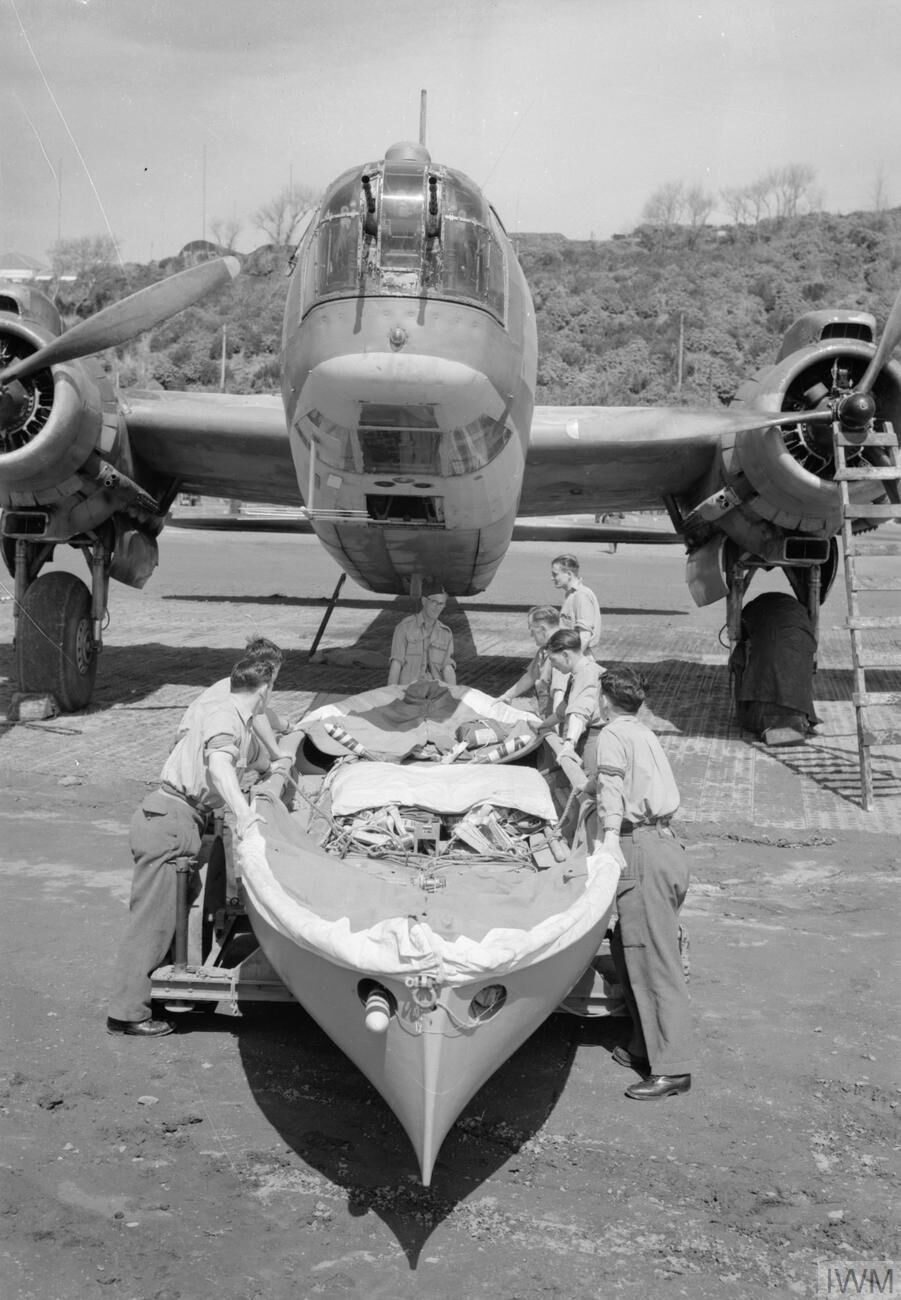
The lifeboat was packed with lifesaving equipment

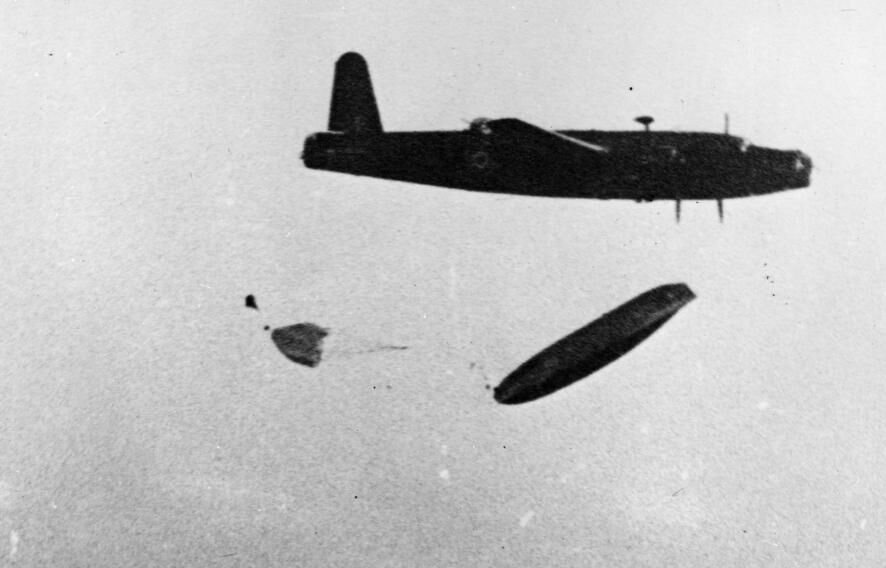
A Vickers Warwick dropping an airborne lifeboat c. 1944-1945

Airborne lifeboats were powered lifeboats that were made to be dropped by fixed-wing aircraft into water to aid in air-sea rescue operations. An airborne lifeboat was to be carried by a heavy bomber specially modified to handle the external load of the lifeboat. The airborne lifeboat was intended to be dropped by parachute to land within reach of the survivors of an accident on the ocean, specifically airmen survivors of an emergency water landing. Airborne lifeboats were used during World War II by the United Kingdom and on Dumbo rescue missions by the United States from 1943 until the mid-1950s.

== Development ==
Air-sea rescue by flying boat or floatplane was a method used by various nations before World War II to pick up aviators or sailors who were struggling in the water. Training and weather accidents could require an aircrew to be pulled from the water, and these two types of seaplane were occasionally used for that purpose. The limitation was that if the water's surface were too rough, the aircraft would not be able to land. Though closer to shore (e.g. in the English Channel) the RAF Air Sea Rescue Service operated High Speed Launches but until 1943, the most that could be done was to drop emergency supplies to the survivors, including an inflatable rubber dinghy carried as-standard in RAF aircraft.

The airborne lifeboat was developed to provide downed airmen with a more navigable and seaworthy vessel that could be sailed greater distances than the rubber dinghy. One of the reasons necessitating this was that when ditching or abandoning an aircraft near enemy-held territory, often the tides and winds would propel the rubber dinghy toward shore, despite the efforts of the occupants to paddle away, resulting in their eventual capture.

== British lifeboats ==
=== Uffa Fox ===
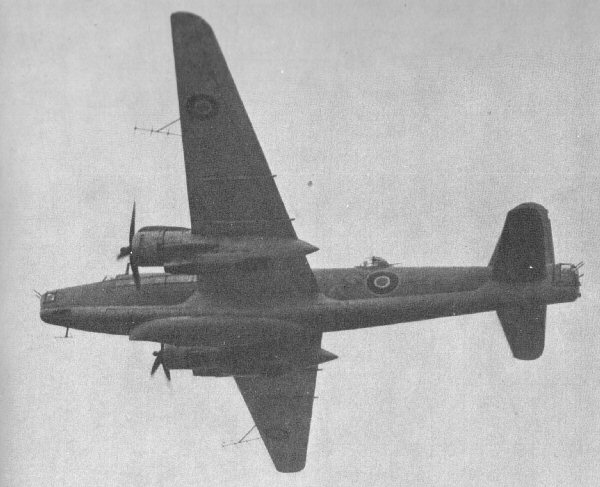
A Vickers Warwick bomber carrying the Uffa Fox-designed airborne lifeboat underneath

The first air-dropped lifeboat was British, a 32-foot (10 m) wooden canoe-shaped boat designed in 1943 by Uffa Fox to be dropped by Royal Air Force (RAF) Vickers Warwick heavy bombers for the rescue of aircrew downed in the Channel. The lifeboat was dropped from a height of 700 feet (210 m), and its descent to the water was slowed by six parachutes. It was balanced so that it would right itself if it overturned—all subsequent airborne lifeboats were given this feature. When it hit the water the parachutes were jettisoned and rockets launched 300 ft (90 m) lifelines. Coamings were inflated on the descent to give it self-righting.

Fox's airborne lifeboat weighed 1,700 pounds (770 kg) and included two 4-horsepower (3 kW) motors—sufficient to make about 6 knots (11 km/h)–augmented by a mast and sails along with an instruction book to teach aircrew the rudiments of sailing. The lifeboats were first carried by Lockheed Hudson aircraft in February 1943. Later, Vickers Warwick bombers carried the Mark II lifeboat. The Fox boats successfully saved downed aircrew as well as glider infantrymen dropped in the water during Operation Market-Garden.

The lifeboats carried emergency equipment, a radio, waterproof suits, rations and medical supplies.

=== Saunders-Roe ===
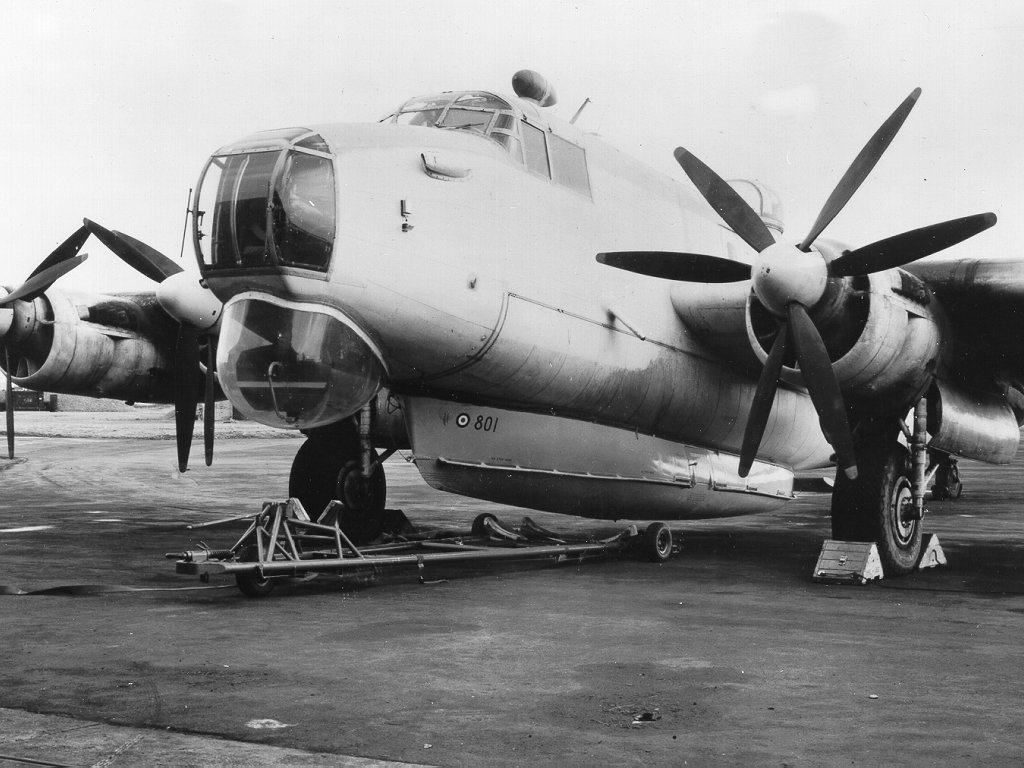
Saunders-Roe Mark 3 airborne lifeboat fitted underneath an Avro Shackleton

In early 1953, Saunders-Roe at Anglesey completed the Mark 3 airborne lifeboat to be fitted underneath the Avro Shackleton maritime reconnaissance aircraft. The Mark 3 was made entirely of aluminium unlike the Fox Mark 1 which was made of wood. Dropped from a height of 700 feet (210 m), the Mark 3 descended under four 42-foot (13 m) parachutes at a rate of 20 feet (6 m) per second into the rescue zone. As the lifeboat dropped, pressurized bottles of carbon dioxide inflated the self-righting chambers at the bow and stern. Upon touching the water, the parachutes were released to blow away, and a drogue opened to slow the boat's drift and aid in the survivors reaching the lifeboat. At the same time, two rockets fired, one to each side, sending out floating lines to provide easier access to the lifeboat for ditched airmen. Doors that opened from the outside provided access to the interior, and the flat deck was made to be self-draining. The craft was powered by a Vincent Motorcycles HRD T5 15-horsepower (11 kW) engine with enough fuel to give a range of 1,250 miles (2,010 km). Sails and a fishing kit were provided, as well as an awning and screen to protect against sun and sea spray. The Mark 3 measured 31 feet (9 m) from bow to stern and 7 feet (2 m) across the beam and held enough to supply 10 people with food and water for 14 days. It carried protective suits, inflatable pillows, sleeping bags, and a first-aid kit.

== American lifeboats ==
=== Higgins ===
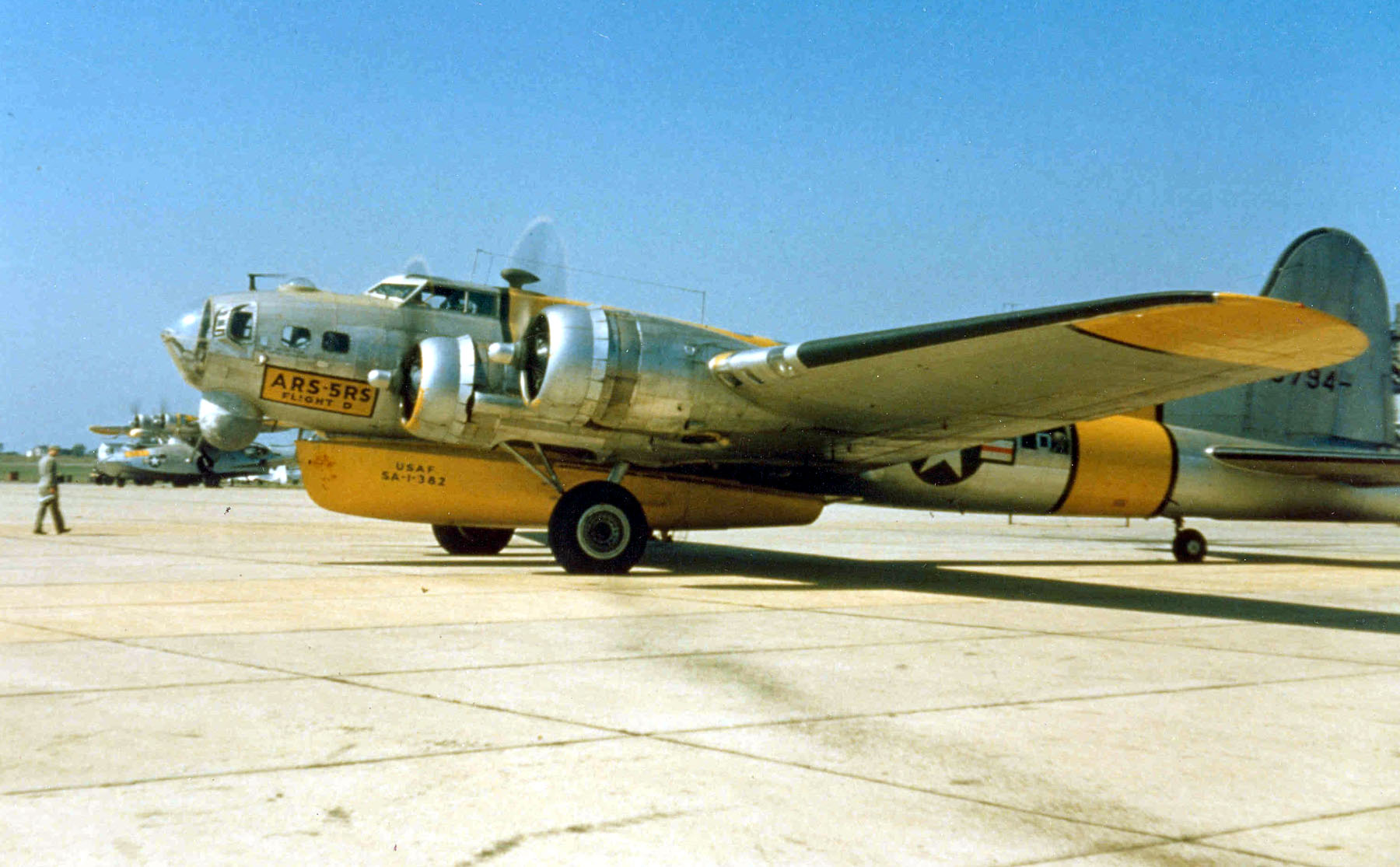
A Boeing SB-17G, an air-sea rescue aircraft modified to carry the A-1 lifeboat

In the United States, Andrew Higgins evaluated the Fox boat and felt it was too weak to survive mishap in emergency operations. In November 1943, Higgins assigned engineers from his company to make a sturdier version with two engines. Higgins Industries, known for making landing craft (LCVPs) and PT boats, produced the A-1 lifeboat, a 1½-ton (1400 kg), 27-foot (8 m) airborne lifeboat with waterproof internal compartments so that it would not sink if swamped or overturned. Intended to be dropped by modified Boeing B-17 Flying Fortresses, it was ready for production in early 1944.

=== EDO Corporation ===
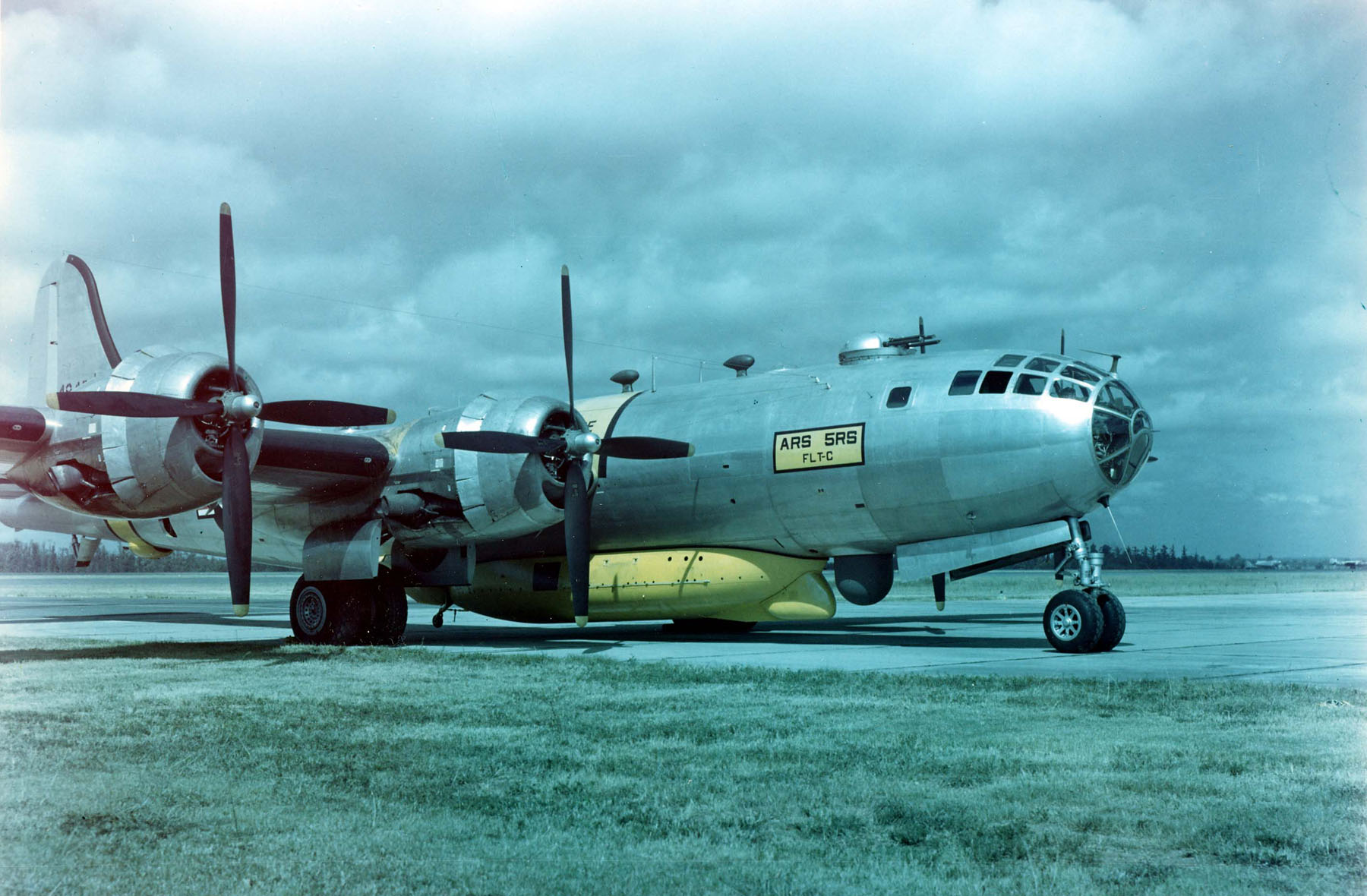
An SB-29 "Super Dumbo", a variant of the B-29 Superfortress, with an air-droppable EDO A-3 lifeboat rigged underneath

The A-3 lifeboat was an airborne lifeboat developed by the EDO Corporation in 1947 for the United States Air Force (USAF) as a successor to the A-1 lifeboat. It was built of aluminium alloy to be carried by the SB-29 Super Dumbo. Various B-29s served air-sea rescue duties on a rotating basis toward the end of the Pacific War, and after the war 16 were converted to carry the A-3 lifeboat. The SB-29 served until the mid-1950s. Approximately 100 of the EDO lifeboats were built but very few rescues were attributed to them.

=== Douglas Aircraft Radio Controlled Life Raft ===
The airborne life boats used by the USAF at the start of the 1950s had two major flaws; they required specially modified aircraft to drop them, and in heavy weather and high winds when dropped they could drift away from the exhausted survivors or be swamped and over turned. The USAF, "Air Sea Rescue Unit of the Air Material Command", was tasked with studying the problem and coming up with a solution. Their solution was an air dropped life boat which before it inflated in the water, looked like a torpedo and could be carried by almost any aircraft in service that had heavy wing pylons. When the boat was dropped near the survivors, on impacting the water large inflatable tubes which were connected to the rescue torpedo inflated, resulting in a radio controlled self-propelled life raft. The pilot would then start the life raft engine by radio control and steer the life raft to the survivors. When the survivors had boarded the life raft one of the rescue aircraft circling above would continue to control and steer the life raft to a safe zone for pick up, or allow the survivors to take over control. The life raft contained its own autopilot, water, dehydrated food, a two way rescue radio and enough fuel for 300 miles of travel.

== See also ==
- Index of aviation articles
- Lindholme Gear
- Vincent lifeboat engine
