= Higgins Industries =

American boat manufacturer

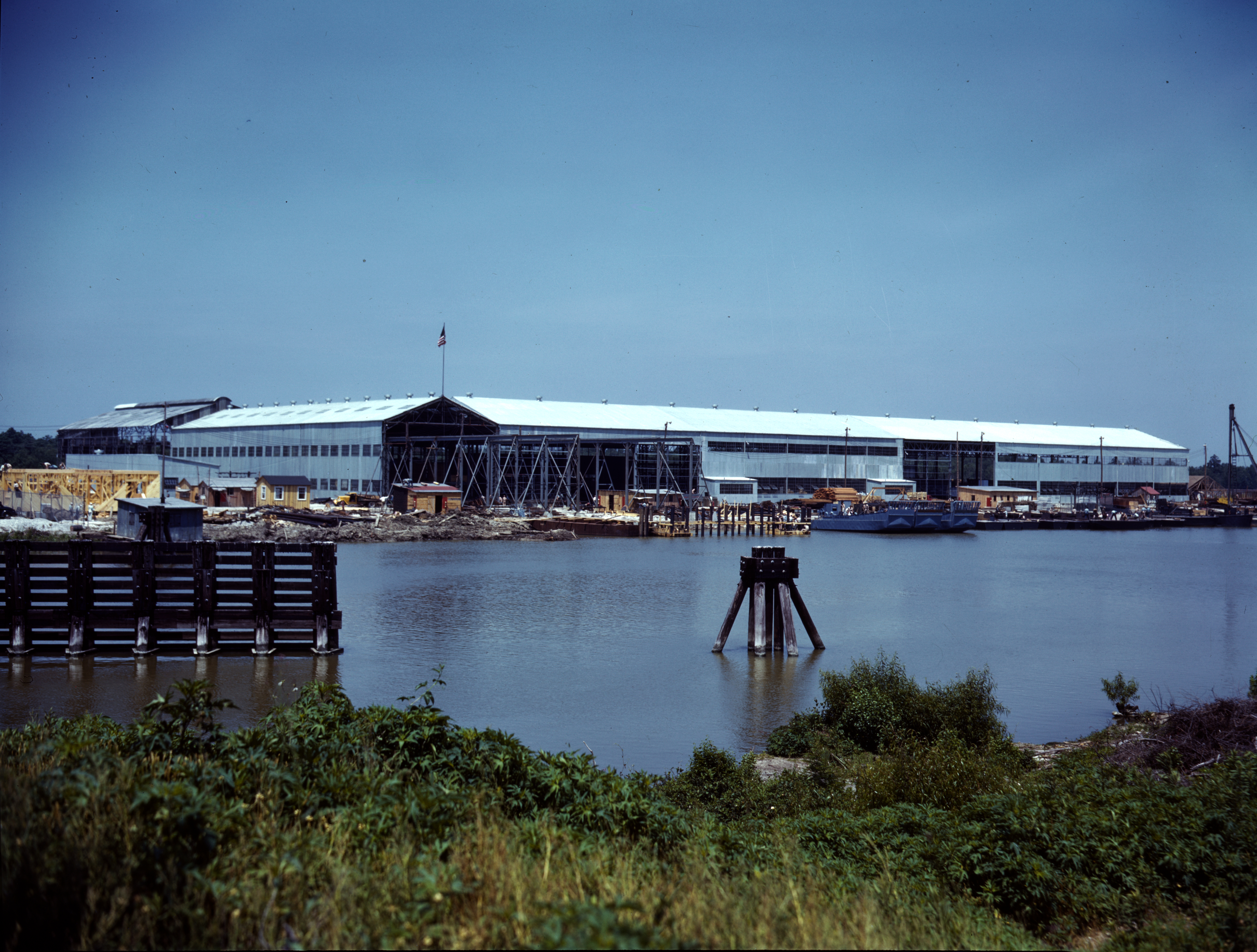
A Higgins Industries torpedo boat plant in New Orleans, 1942

Higgins Industries was the company owned by Andrew Higgins based in New Orleans, Louisiana, United States. Higgins Industries is most famous for the design and production of the Higgins boat, an amphibious landing craft referred to as LCVP (Landing Craft, Vehicle, Personnel), which was used extensively in the Allied forces' D-Day Invasion of Normandy. Higgins also manufactured PT boats, and produced the first American airborne lifeboat, the model A-1 lifeboat. The company also had a subsidiary architectural firm that designed manufacturing buildings - most famously the Michoud Assembly Facility.

Andrew Higgins also owned the New Orleans–based Higgins Lumber and Export Co., and Higgins Aircraft, which contracted to provide aircraft for the US military during World War II.

== History ==
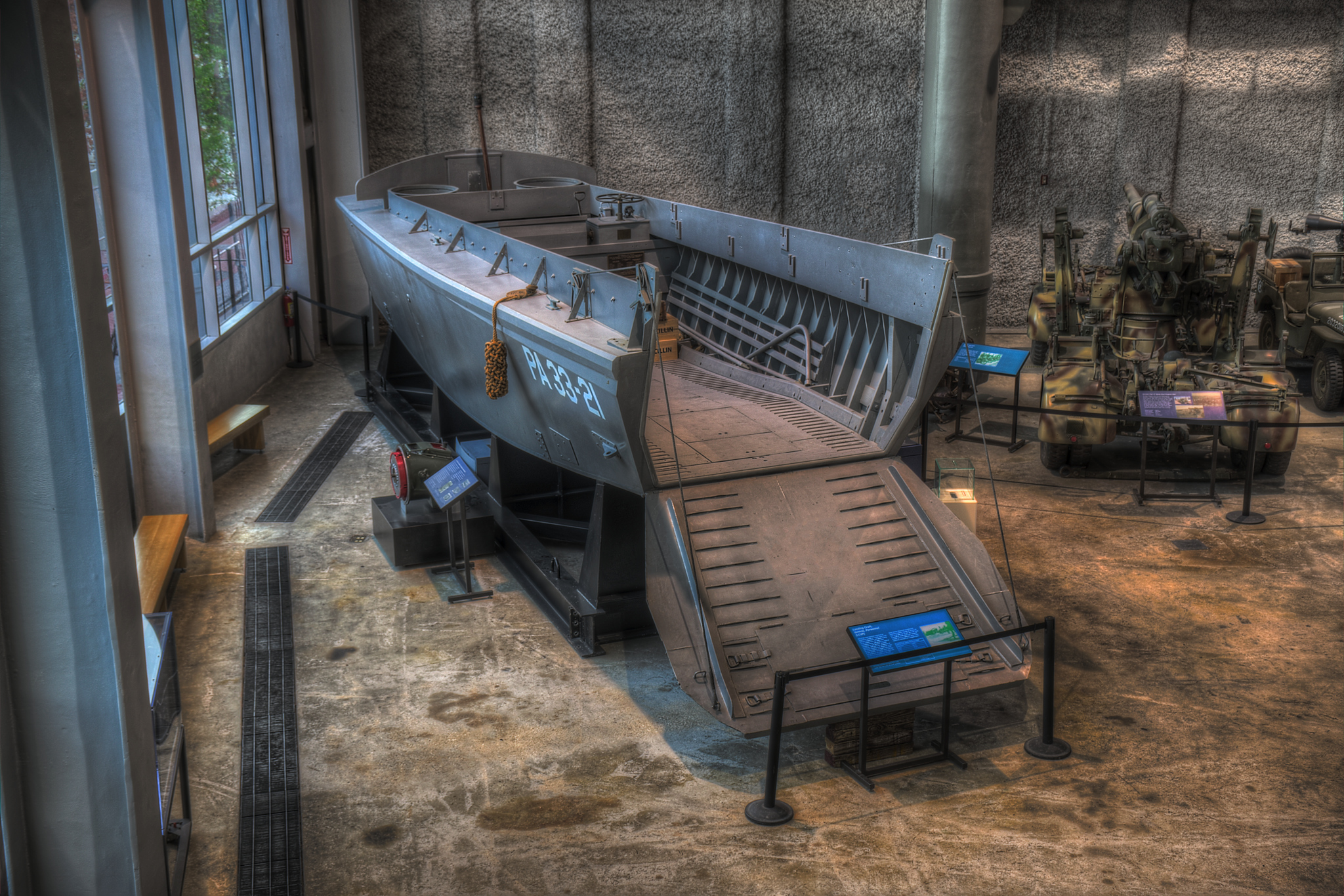
Higgins boat on display in The National WWII Museum

Before World War Two, Higgins got its big start with the design and production of small shallow-draft boats that were designed to be operated in the shallow marsh areas common to Louisiana. These small but fast boats were called Eureka Boats or Spoonbills, and they could impact partially submerged logs without suffering damage. The propeller was partially enclosed in a tunnel to protect it against submerged objects. The Spoonbill was the first design used for a personnel landing craft used by the US Navy, the Landing Craft Personnel (Large) (LCP(L)), before the famous and much improved Higgins LCVP, the "Higgins Boat" was offered. These were the landing craft that were main type used on the invasion of Guadalcanal. Unfortunately, these first primitive landing craft (LCPL) required the landing party to go over the sides to exit the craft exposing them to enemy fire. But later in the war they were found extremely successful for combat engineer units, rescue, etc.

Higgins Industries expanded rapidly to meet military needs during World War II, going from a single plant employing fewer than 75 people before the war to 7 plants employing more than 20,000 workers by 1943. Higgins employed the first fully integrated working force of women and men, African Americans and whites in New Orleans.

In 1964, Dwight D. Eisenhower said to historian Stephen Ambrose: "[Andrew Higgins] is the man who won the war for us. If Higgins had not designed and built those landing craft, we never would have landed over an open beach. The whole strategy of the war would have been different."

Higgins Industries produced over sixty different items for the US government during the war. Higgins ranked 70th among United States corporations in the value of World War II military production contracts. The resulting business success allowed Andrew Higgins to expand into several other ventures, including Higgins Aircraft, Higgins Engine Co., and Higgins Plastics Corp.

=== Higgins Aircraft ===
Higgins Aircraft was contracted to build the all-plywood-construction Curtiss-Wright C-76 Caravan, and later, the C-46 Commando, but both contracts were cancelled at an early stage, and the company managed to complete only two C-46A aircraft before production shut down. The Commando contract was cancelled on 10 August 1944. Before the government repossessed the factory complex, Higgins managed to finish a helicopter of early design in 1946.

=== Post-war decline ===
After the war he tried to transition this capability into consumer products such as appliances, personal watercraft, and housing materials. In late 1945 Frank P. Higgins, brother of Andrew, became director of marketing, operating the Higgins Marine Sales Corp. However, labor strife complicated the picture, and on 9 November 1945 Andrew Higgins liquidated the business. In January of the following year he formed another company (Higgins, Inc.) to resume building pleasure watercraft. The other industrial properties of the previous Higgins Industries were transferred to ownership of the new company, but were never successful in finding markets for their products. By 1948 all the other plants were closed, and watercraft production was concentrated in the Industrial Canal plant.

Andrew Higgins died of a stomach ailment at age sixty-five on August 1, 1952. His sons (Ed, Andrew Jr., Frank, and Roland) continued the business through the 1950s, but mounting debts resulted in the sale of Higgins, Inc. to New York Ship in 1959. New York Ship was subsequently sold to what would eventually become Equitable Equipment Company. Higgins Marine Sales Corporation continued at the old City Park Plant until 1970, when it moved to Thalia Street, where it operated for five more years before closing.

One of the Higgins factories in New Orleans was converted into NASA's Michoud Assembly Facility in 1961.

== Products ==
=== Boats ===
- Eureka boat (LCPL) a.k.a. Spoonbill
- Higgins boat (LCVP)
- A-1 lifeboat airborne lifeboat

==== PT boats ====
- PT-5
- PT-6
- PT-6'
- PT-70
- PT-71 class
- PT-235 class
- PT-625 class

=== Helicopters ===
- Higgins EB-1
