= Andrew Higgins =

American businessman (1886–1952)

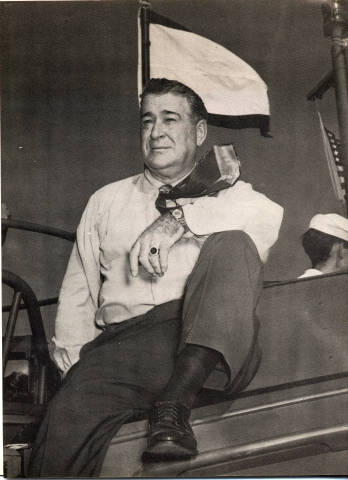
- Born: Andrew Jackson Higgins; August 28, 1886; Columbus, Nebraska
- Died: August 1, 1952 (aged 65); New Orleans, Louisiana
- Education: Creighton Prep High School
- Occupations: Owner of Higgins Industries, boatbuilder
- Spouse: Angele Colsson Higgins (1889-1965)
- Children: 6

Andrew Jackson Higgins (28 August 1886 – 1 August 1952) was an American businessman and boatbuilder who founded Higgins Industries, the New Orleans–based manufacturer of "Higgins boats" (Landing Craft, Vehicle, Personnel, or LCVPs) during World War II. The company started out as a small boat-manufacturing business, and became one of the biggest industries in the world with upwards of eighty thousand workers and government contracts worth nearly three hundred fifty million dollars. General Dwight Eisenhower is quoted as saying, "Andrew Higgins ... is the man who won the war for us. ... If Higgins had not designed and built those LCVPs, we never could have landed over an open beach. The whole strategy of the war would have been different." Adolf Hitler recognized Higgins war efforts in ship production and bitterly dubbed him the "New Noah".

== Early life and barge/boatbuilding ==
Andrew Higgins was born on 28 August 1886 in Columbus, Nebraska, the youngest child of John Gonegle Higgins and Annie Long (O'Conor) Higgins. His father was a Chicago attorney and newspaper reporter who had relocated to Nebraska, where he served as a local judge. Higgins' father died after a fall when Higgins was seven years old.

Higgins was raised in Omaha and completed three years at Creighton Prep High School before being expelled for brawling. He served in the Nebraska Army National Guard, attaining the rank of first lieutenant, first in the Infantry, and later in the Engineers. He gained his first experience with boat building and moving troops on the water during militia maneuvers on the Platte River.

He left Omaha in 1906 to enter the lumber business in Mobile, Alabama, and worked at a variety of jobs in the lumber, shipping and boat building industries in an effort to gain experience for starting his own company. In 1910 he became manager of a German-owned lumber-importing firm in New Orleans. In 1922, he formed his own company, the Higgins Lumber and Export Co., importing hardwood from the Philippines, Central America and Africa, and exporting bald cypress and pine. He acquired a fleet of sailing ships, said to have been the largest under American registry at that time. To service this fleet, he established a shipyard which built and repaired his cargomen as well as the tugs and barges needed to support them. As part of his work in boat building and design Higgins completed a program in naval architecture through the National University of Sciences in Chicago, an unaccredited correspondence school, which awarded him a Bachelor of Science degree.

In 1926 he designed the Eureka boat, a shallow-draft craft for use by oil drillers and trappers in operations along the Gulf coast and in lower Mississippi River. With a propeller recessed into a semi-tunnel in the hull, the boat could be operated in shallow waters where flotsam and submerged obstacles could foul the usual types of propellers. He designed a "spoonbill" bow for his craft, allowing it to be run onto riverbanks and then to back off with ease. His boats proved to be record-beaters; and within a decade he had improved the design to attain high speed in shallow water and turn nearly in its own length.

Stiff competition, declining world trade, and the employment of tramp steamers to carry lumber cargoes combined to put Higgins' Lumber and Export Co. out of business. He kept his boatbuilding firm (established in 1930 as Higgins Industries) in business, constructing motorboats, tugs and barges, for the private market as well as the United States Coast Guard.

== Military boatbuilding ==
The Marine Corps, interested in finding better ways to get men across a beach in an amphibious landing and frustrated that the Bureau of Construction and Repair could not meet its requirements, expressed interest in Higgins' boat. When tested in 1938 by the Navy and Marine Corps, Higgins' Eureka boat surpassed the performance of the Navy-designed boat and was tested by the services during fleet landing exercises in February 1939 as the LCPL. The design was considered satisfactory except for its offloading process, with men and equipment disembarking over its sides, which would expose them to enemy fire in a combat situation.

The Japanese, however, had been using ramp-bowed landing boats in the Second Sino-Japanese War since the summer of 1937. They had been studied by the Navy and Marine Corps observers at Shanghai in particular. When shown a picture of such a craft, Higgins called his chief engineer and arranged for a mock-up to be built and ready for his inspection upon his return to New Orleans.

Within one month, tests of the ramp-bow Eureka boat in Lake Pontchartrain showed that such a boat was feasible. Thus was born the LCVP (Landing Craft, Vehicle, Personnel), usually called the Higgins boat. It could carry 36 soldiers, and over 23,000 boats were produced during World War II. A larger version, originally classified as a "tank lighter" came on its heels, the precursor of the LCM (Landing Craft, Mechanized).

With the use of the Higgins boat, armies could unload across open beaches instead of at ports, which were heavily guarded. This allowed the troops to spread out and attack from a wide range of areas. These tactics were utilized for many Allied operations, including the Normandy landings.

== Higgins Industries work force and contracts ==
Higgins believed in a diversified workforce for his plants, including all races and genders, and sought highly skilled employees. This type of workforce drew the attention of politicians, including Presidents Franklin D. Roosevelt and Harry S. Truman, who were frequent visitors.

Higgins Industries was one of the world's largest manufacturers, with over 85,000 workers and $350,000,000 in government contracts. With his first plant built on City Park Avenue, Higgins began to produce LCVPs non-stop. As more and more rail cars were filled and delivered to Bayou St. John, his government contracts increased, allowing him to expand to seven plants with the ability to produce larger landing crafts, PT boats and airplanes. One Higgins Industries plant was built on the Industrial Canal, allowing greater transportation access.

== World War II industrialist ==
Higgins' plants produced a variety of naval equipment in World War II, including landing craft, Motor Torpedo Boats (PT Boats), torpedo tubes, gun turrets, and smoke generators. Over 20,000 boats were produced during the war. Operation Torch used three different types of landing craft. The first type were Higgins boats made of plywood and designed for navigating swamps. They were considered unsuccessful, due to rocks damaging the hulls, and requiring over-the-side disembarkment. The second of the Torch operation vessels was the Landing Craft Personnel Ramp. This version of the Higgins boat proved successful unloading onto beaches after testing on Lake Pontchartrain. This design placed machine guns at the bow of the vessel to the side in order to provide access via the center ramp. The third vessel in the operations was the Landing Craft Vehicle. Machine guns were moved to the rear of the boat to accommodate for an increase in supply space. This change maximizes space for transportation of large land vehicles with the use of a new full width ramp.

During the war, Higgins became associated with Preston Tucker, who become famous for his controversial 1948 Tucker Sedan. Tucker had gained the attention of the US Navy by developing a gun turret, the Tucker Turret, and had formed the Tucker Aviation Corporation. Higgins acquired Tucker Aviation Corporation in March 1942, and Tucker moved to New Orleans as a vice-president of Higgins Industries, in charge of the Higgins–Tucker Aviation division. This entity produced Tucker gun turrets, armament and engines for Higgins' torpedo boats. This relationship did not work out and Tucker departed in 1943.

== Post-war efforts ==
The federal government began canceling war contracts after Japan surrendered and Higgins' ship building ended on October 11, 1945. This greatly affected Higgins Industries, as did the increased unionizing of his workers. Higgins began losing money due to multiple strikes and sold off most of his plants. The company went on to build more LCVPs, but did not have much success with receiving government grants.

=== Michoud factory ===
In 1940, Higgins Industries was contracted by the US Army Corps of Engineers to construct a large aircraft manufacturing facility (equipped with an airstrip) in the village coastal area of Michoud, New Orleans, at a cost of $180 million ($2.8 billion in 2018), known as the Michoud Ordnance Plant. In 1951 this facility was converted to manufacture equipment for the Korean War, but did not achieve full operation before that conflict ended. In 1961, with impetus from the Space Race, the newly established National Aeronautics and Space Administration determined the facility could be used to manufacture the Saturn V rocket. The plant was upgraded to accommodate the space project, and was renamed as the Michoud Assembly Facility.

== Politics ==
Higgins was an influential part of American history, with his participation in World War II and in national politics. With the rising success of Higgins Industries, Higgins found himself in a position of power and influence. When Franklin D. Roosevelt was running for his fourth consecutive term alongside vice presidential candidate Harry Truman, Higgins made sure his voice and opinion were heard. Higgins revered them and urged the nation to vote for them during the 1944 presidential election campaign while visiting various cities such as Boston and New York. Roosevelt and Truman won and thanked Higgins for his strong recommendations and for playing a significant role in swaying the nation's opinion in that election.

== Death and burial ==
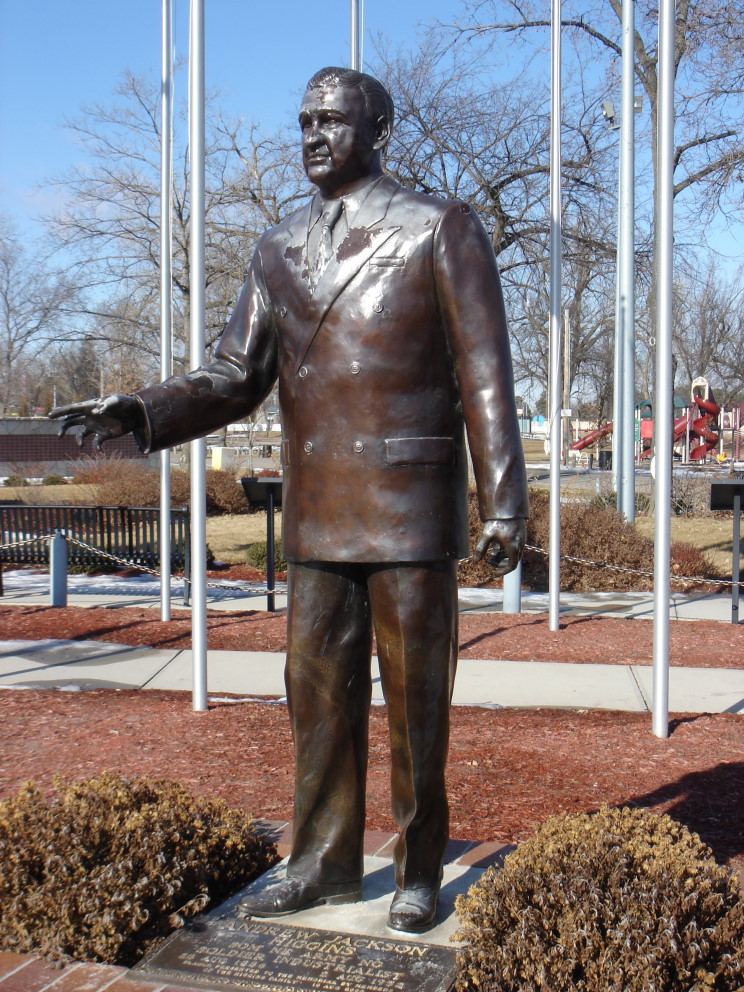
Statue of Andrew J. Higgins at the Andrew Jackson Higgins National Memorial in Columbus, Nebraska.

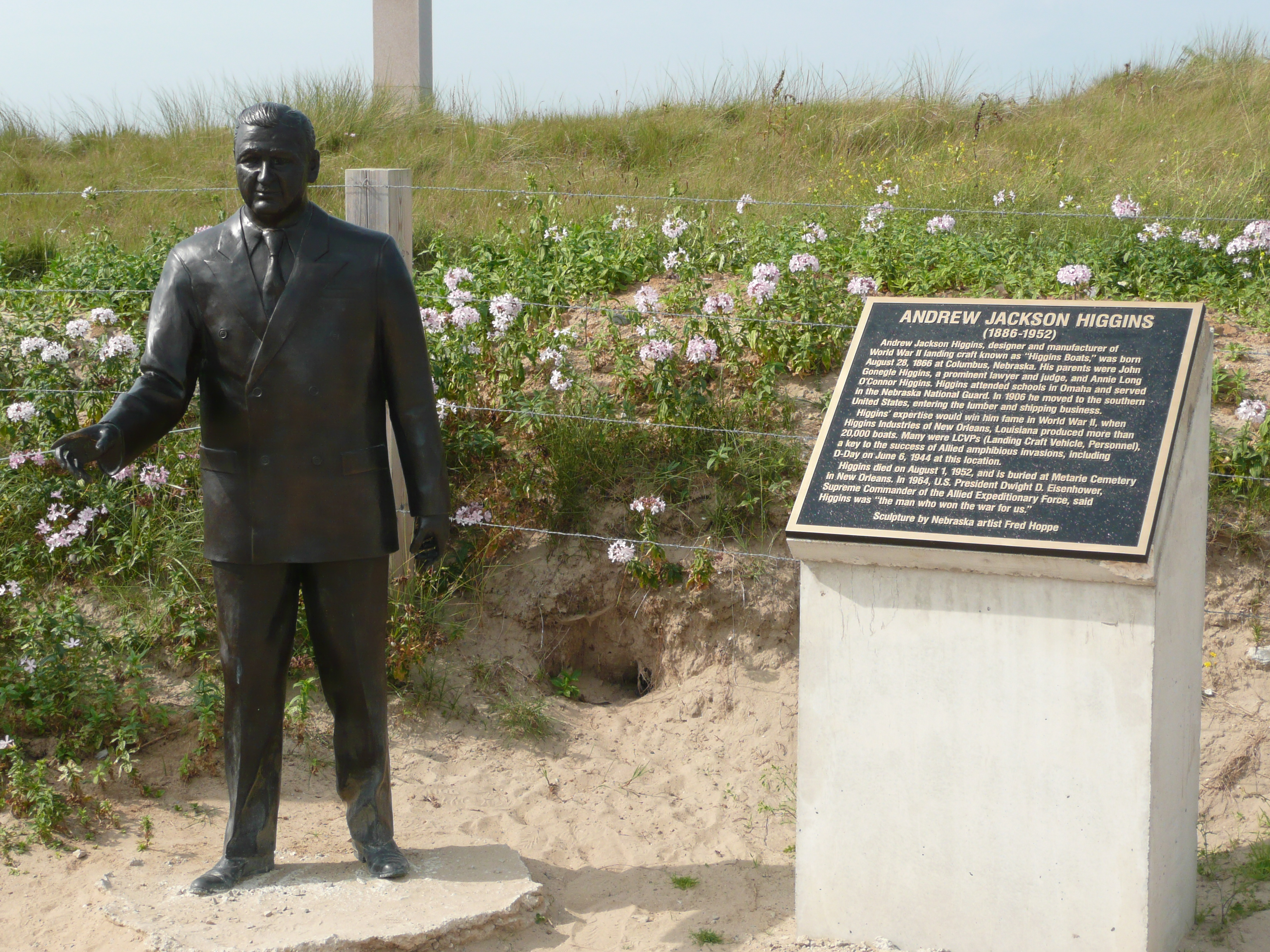
Memorial at Utah Beach, Normandy, France

Higgins died in New Orleans on 1 August 1952, and was buried in Metairie Cemetery. He had been hospitalized for a week to treat stomach ulcers when he suffered a fatal stroke.

== Legacy ==
Higgins held 30 patents, mostly covering amphibious landing craft and vehicles. In 1943 Creighton University awarded him an honorary Doctor of Laws degree. In 1987, the Fleet Oiler, USNS Andrew J. Higgins (T-AO-190) was named in his honor. There is a memorial to Higgins in Columbus, Nebraska, and a seven-mile (11 km) segment of U.S. Route 81 south of Columbus is designated as the "Andrew Jackson Higgins Expressway".

In 2000, a 7-block section of Howard Avenue in the Warehouse District of New Orleans near the newly opened D-Day Museum (now The National WWII Museum) was renamed "Andrew Higgins Street.".

Gerald Meyer, a history teacher at Columbus High School, worked with his students to create the Andrew Jackson Higgins National Memorial in Higgins' hometown of Columbus, Nebraska, which was dedicated in August 2001.

== See also ==
- Higgins Industries
- D-Day
- Higgins boat
