= USS Brock =

1944 Crosley-class high speed transport

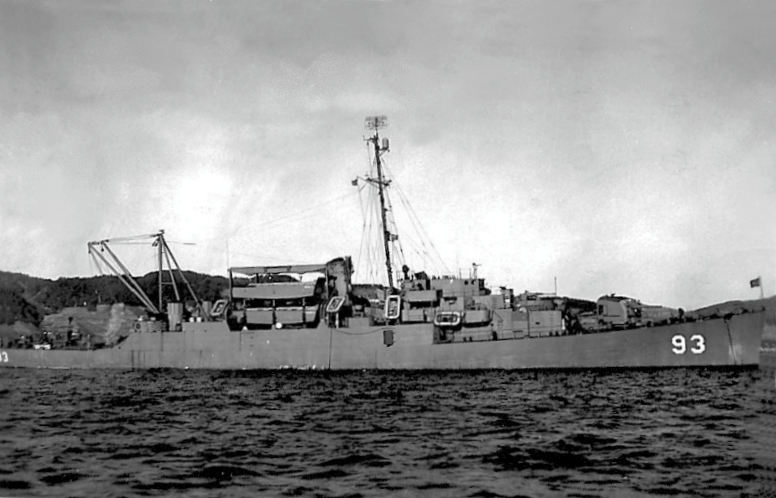
- USS Brock

History

United States
- Name: USS Brock
- Namesake: Ensign John W. Brock (1914-1942), Navy Cross recipient
- Builder: Charleston Navy Yard
- Laid down: 27 October 1943
- Launched: 20 January 1944
- Sponsored by: Mrs. James W. Brock
- Commissioned: 9 February 1945
- Decommissioned: 5 May 1947
- Reclassified: From destroyer escort (DE-234) to high-speed transport (APD-93) 17 July 1944
- Stricken: 1 June 1960
- Honors and awards: 1 battle star for World War II service
- Fate: Sold to Colombia for use as floating power plant January 1962
- Notes: Laid down as Rudderow-class destroyer escort USS Brock (DE-234)

General characteristics
- Class & type: Crosley-class high speed transport
- Displacement: 2,130 long tons (2,164 t) full
- Length: 306 ft (93 m)
- Beam: 37 ft (11 m)
- Draft: 12 ft 7 in (3.84 m)
- Speed: 23 knots (43 km/h; 26 mph)
- Troops: 162
- Complement: 204
- Armament: 1 × 5 in (130 mm) gun; 6 × 40 mm guns; 6 × 20 mm guns; 2 × depth charge tracks

USS Brock (APD-93), ex-DE-234, was a United States Navy high-speed transport in commission from 1945 to 1947.

== Namesake ==
John Wiley Brock was born in New Brockton, Alabama, on 15 August 1914. He enlisted in the U.S. Navy on 12 May 1936 at Birmingham, Alabama. After basic training at the Naval Training Station Norfolk in Norfolk, Virginia, he reported on board the battleship USS Arkansas) on 5 February 1937.

Transferred to Naval Air Station Norfolk on 21 May 1937, Brock was assigned to the receiving ship at Naval Operating Base Norfolk, serving as part of the detail fitting out the new aircraft carrier USS Yorktown. During duty at Naval Air Station Norfolk which followed, he was advanced to the rate of seaman first class on 1 September 1937. On 30 September 1937, Brock was assigned to the staff of the Commander, Carrier Division 2, Rear Admiral Charles Adams Blakely. Promoted to aviation ordnanceman third class on 16 February 1938, Brock was transferred to Torpedo Squadron 6 soon afterward, on 15 April 1938.

On 13 April 1939, Brock was assigned to Naval Air Station Pensacola, Florida, where he underwent flight training as a naval enlisted pilot. Promoted to aviation ordnanceman second class on 16 December 1939, he rejoined Torpedo Squadron 6 on 10 May 1940, remaining in that squadron until autumn, when he received orders to Naval Training Station Norfolk. While serving there, he was advanced in rate to aviation ordnanceman 1st class on 16 November 1940. After a brief assignment to the receiving ship at Naval Base San Diego at San Diego, California, he joined the oiler USS Brazos on 30 June 1941, and ultimately reported to Torpedo Squadron 6 for a third time, on 2 August 1941. He was commissioned as an ensign on 21 April 1942, and attained the permanent rate of pilot first class on 30 April 1942.

During the Battle of Midway on the morning of 4 June 1942 he took off from the aircraft carrier USS Enterprise in one of Torpedo Squadron 6's 14 Douglas TBD-1 Devastator torpedo bombers. In the course of the flight toward the Imperial Japanese Navy's "Mobile Force" of aircraft carriers, the fighters, dive bombers and torpedo planes of Enterprise's attack group became separated from one another. Thus unable to carry out a coordinated attack as doctrine dictated, Torpedo Squadron 6 went in unsupported by fighters or dive bombers, and 10 of its fourteen planes were shot down.

During the melee, as Japanese Mitsubishi A6M2 "Zero" fighters vigorously attacked Torpedo Squadron 6, Brock lifted the nose of his plane to bring his fixed, forward-firing machine gun to bear on a Japanese fighter, only to be shot down moments later. His TBD-1, aircraft 6-T-14, crashed into the sea, and neither Brock nor his radio-gunner, Aviation Radioman Third Class J. M. Blundell, survived. For his part in the attack carried out by Torpedo Squadron 6, Brock was awarded the Navy Cross posthumously.

== Construction and commissioning ==
Brock was laid down as the Rudderow-class destroyer escort USS Brock (DE-234) on 27 October 1943 by the Charleston Navy Yard and launched as such on 20 January 1944, sponsored by Mrs. James W. Brock, mother of the ship's namesake, Ensign John W. Brock. The ship was reclassified as a Crosley-class high-speed transport and redesignated APD-93 on 17 July 1944. After conversion to her new role, the ship was commissioned on 9 February 1945.

== Service history ==
=== World War II ===
After fitting out, Brock departed Charleston Navy Yard on 2 March 1945 bound for Cuba. Reaching Guantanamo Bay, Cuba, on 4 March 1945, she conducted shakedown training until 19 March 1945, when she headed for Hampton Roads, Virginia. Following post-shakedown repairs and alterations at the Norfolk Navy Yard in Portsmouth, Virginia, Brock embarked passengers at the nearby Naval Operating Base Norfolk at Norfolk, Virginia, on 8 April 1945 and got underway for the Panama Canal Zone shortly thereafter as escort for the Pacific-bound attack cargo ships USS Seminole (AKA-104) and USS Mathews (AKA-96).

Brock transited the Panama Canal on 14 April 1945 and, on 15 April 1945, departed for California. She reached San Diego, California, on 23 April 1945, but remained there only 18 hours before putting to sea for Hawaii with United States Marine Corps replacements embarked. She reached Pearl Harbor, Territory of Hawaii, on 2 May 1945 and soon thereafter conducted amphibious demolition exercises with an embarked underwater demolition team.

On 12 May 1945, Brock sailed for the Marshall Islands in company with high-speed transport USS Kane (APD-18) and the attack transports USS Garrard (APA-84) and USS Sevier (APA-233). She reached Eniwetok on 21 May 1945 and, on 22 May 1945, sailed for Ulithi Atoll in the western Caroline Islands. Entering Ulithi lagoon on 24 May 1945, Brock dropped anchor; her officers and enlisted men enjoyed liberty at Mog Mog.

On 31 May 1945, Brock left that Ulitihi Atoll in her wake, bound for the Philippines, and reached San Pedro Bay, Leyte, in the Philippine Islands on 3 June 1945. Pausing there for four days, Brock joined company with Kane once more and departed on 7 June 1945 to escort a convoy to the Ryukyu Islands. Upon reaching Kerama Retto on 12 June 1945, Brock drew duty on a screening station off the southeastern coast of Okinawa, where the Okinawa campaign was drawing to a close. She operated in those waters until 19 June 1945, when she switched to a station between Ie Shima and Okinawa.

On the evening of 23 June 1945, orders sent Brock 20 nautical miles (37 kilometers) to seaward to rescue a downed pilot, who turned out to be First Lieutenant Gustave T. Broberg, USMCR, a former all-American basketball player from Dartmouth College. The former Ivy Leaguer had been forced down while returning from a mission over Formosa and uninjured, had been in the water two hours.

On 26 June 1945, Brock encountered the enemy. While steaming independently on antisubmarine screening station E-23, approximately two nautical miles (3.7 kilometers) northeast of Ie Shima, Brock detected an unidentified radar contact, or "bogey," at 01:13 hours, 15 nautical miles (28 kilometers) away and closing. As she tracked the intruder, Brock's commanding officer ordered her speed cut to five knots (9.25 kilometers per hour) to reduce her wake and to permit rapid acceleration if necessary and had the helmsman steer directly into the moon to reduce her silhouette. The barrels of Brock's after 40-millimeter antiaircraft guns followed the "bogey"—itself apparently unaware of Brock's presence—as it flew within 1,000 yards (914 meters) of Brock. Suddenly, the Japanese pilot detected Brock and veered off sharply toward her starboard quarter. Brock's starboard 20-millimeter and 40-millimeter guns aft opened fire at point-blank range, "positively and unmistakably" hitting the plane, which observers identified as a Mitsubishi J2M "Jack" single-engine Imperial Japanese Navy fighter. The "Jack" paralleled Brock's course until her forward 40-millimeter guns could no longer depress to fire. When the "Jack" reached a point about 1,500 yards (1,372 meters) ahead of Brock, it started a turn back toward the ship, perhaps intending to crash into her, but then went out of control and crashed, leaving only a burning gasoline slick to mark its resting place.

On 1 July 1945, Brock departed Okinawa bound for the Philippines in company with three other high-speed transports, USS Osmond Ingram (APD-35), USS Crosley (APD-87) and USS Joseph E. Campbell (APD-45) and two submarine chasers, USS SC-1012 and USS SC-1474. Arriving in San Pedro Bay at Leyte on 6 July 1945, Brock reported for duty with the Philippine Sea Frontier's forces and carried out local patrols for the remainder of World War II, which ended on 15 August 1945.

=== Postwar ===
Winding up her Philippine Sea Frontier duty, Brock set course for Hollandia, Dutch New Guinea, on 20 August 1945 and crossed the equator for the first time on 23 August 1945; in the traditional "Neptune Ceremonies," her 33 "shellbacks" duly initiated nearly 200 "pollywogs," including the commanding officer and 10 of the 12 officers on board. Later that day, Brock dropped anchor in Humboldt Bay, New Guinea. On 27 August 1945, she set a return course for the Philippines, and she reached Leyte on 31 August 1945.

Heading for Manila on Luzon on 1 September 1945, Brock reached Manila on 3 September 1945. Underway again on 7 September 1945, Brock and destroyer escort USS Ebert (DE-768) sailed for Japan, escorting 22 attack transports which bore United States Eighth Army troops headed for occupation duty in Japan. Brock reached Tokyo Bay on 13 September 1945 and remained in Japanese waters until 23 September 1945, when she departed in the escort for a Leyte-bound convoy. During this voyage, Brock spotted and sank a naval mine ahead of the convoy. She anchored in San Pedro Bay, Leyte, on 4 October 1945 and entered drydock there on 10 October 1945. Along with other work, Brock received a coat of peacetime gray paint over the "green dragon" camouflage that had become standard for high-speed transports.

Departing Philippine waters on 16 October 1945 with passengers embarked, Brock escorted a second convoy to Tokyo Bay, where she arrived on 27 October 1945. Following duty in the Inland Sea, Brock departed for Honshu on 7 November 1945 and reached Hiro Wan on 9 November 1945. She relieved the destroyer USS Rowan (DD-782) as harbor entrance control vessel at the entrance to the Bungo Strait on 11 November 1945 and served in that capacity and on patrol in the Inland Sea until 15 December 1945.

At that point, Brock broke her homeward-bound pennant and set course for the United States in company with high-speed transport USS John Q. Roberts (APD-94). After stops at Nagoya in Japan, Eniwetok, Pearl Harbor, and San Diego, California, Brock reached San Pedro, California, on 10 January 1946. Following repairs and alterations there, she headed for the Atlantic on 15 February 1946. She reached the Panama Canal Zone on 24 February 1946 and reported for duty to the Commander, Amphibious Force, Atlantic Fleet, on 26 February 1946. Brock then proceeded north to Boston, Massachusetts, where she arrived on 5 March 1946 to begin a pre-inactivation overhaul. Underway for Green Cove Springs, Florida, on 11 April 1946, Brock arrived there on 13 April 1946, and joined the Florida Group, 16th Fleet, which later became the Florida Group, Atlantic Reserve Fleet. For the next year, Brock served as one of the "mother ships" for the Florida Group, providing steam and power to various ships of the inactive fleet and furnishing quarters and mess facilities for men deactivating ships at Green Cove Springs.

== Decommissioning and disposal ==
Decommissioned on 5 May 1947, Brock was placed in reserve at Green Cove Springs on 4 June 1947 and remained there for nearly 13 years. On 1 June 1960, her name was stricken from the Navy List, and she was sold to the government of Colombia in January 1962 for use as a floating power plant.

== Honors and awards ==
Brock received one battle star for her service in World War II.
