= HMAS Air View =

Australian rescue boat

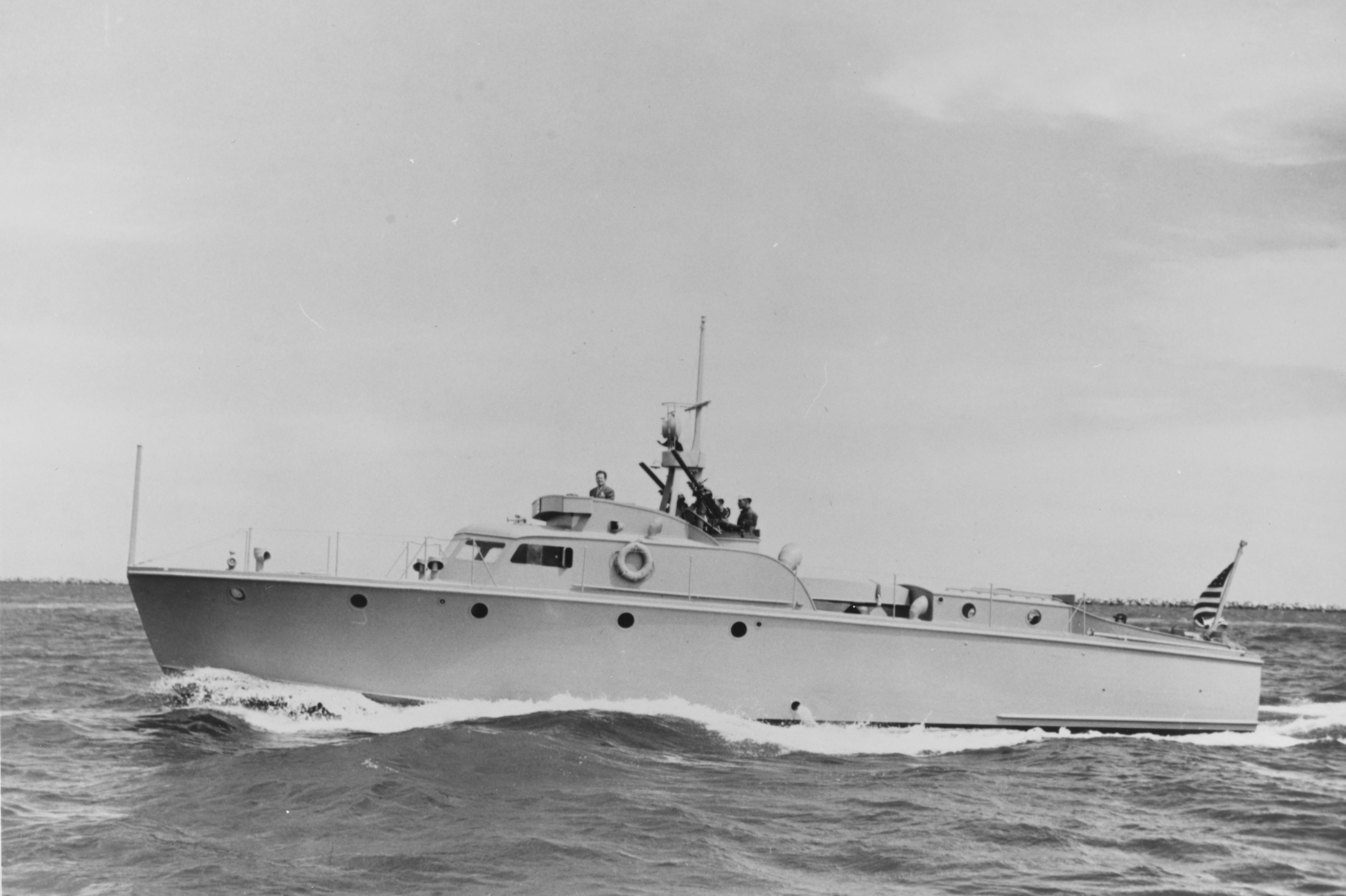

History

Australia
- Name: HMAS Air View
- Operator: Royal Australian Navy
- Ordered: 4 March 1944
- Builder: Fellows & Stewart, Wilmington, California
- Commissioned: 20 November 1944
- Decommissioned: 30 September 1946
- Fate: Transferred to the Royal Australian Air Force in 1949

- Name: 02-109
- Operator: Royal Australian Air Force
- Acquired: 1949
- Fate: Sold to private owners, 1985
- Status: Undergoing restoration, 2012

General characteristics
- Class & type: Miami-class air-sea rescue boat
- Displacement: 23 long tons (23 t)
- Length: 63 ft (19 m) o/a
- Beam: 15 ft 4 in (4.67 m)
- Draught: 4 ft (1.2 m)
- Propulsion: 2 × 630 hp (470 kW) Hall-Scott Defender V12 petrol engines
- Speed: 31.5 knots (58.3 km/h; 36.2 mph)
- Endurance: 14.5 hours
- Complement: 7 or 8
- Armament: 2 × twin .50 cal. M2 Browning machine guns

HMAS Air View (923) was a Miami-class 63-foot Air-Sea Rescue Boat that was operated by the Royal Australian Navy during World War II, and later by the Royal Australian Air Force. Built by Fellows & Stewart in Wilmington, California.

== Design ==
The Miami class rescue boats were wooden-hulled, and powered by two 630 hp (470 kW) Hall-Scott Defender petrol engines giving a top speed of 31.5 knots. They were armed with two twin .50 calibre M2 Browning machine guns mounted either side of the bridge. The crew comprised one officer in command, a coxswain, two engineers, two seamen and one or two radio operators.

== Service history ==
Air View was one of a class of twenty boats ordered on 4 March 1944. They were all Model 314 boats, designed by the Miami Shipbuilding Corporation, of Miami, Florida, but built at a number of shipyards in California. Air View was built by Fellows & Stewart in Wilmington, California, as hull C-26683 and arrived at Sydney aboard the MV Laponia in June 1944, and was commissioned on 20 November 1944.

Air View was stationed in and around Sydney until September 1945, when she sailed for Darwin, and subsequently operated in the Torres Strait into 1946.

Air View was placed into reserve on 30 September 1946, and in 1949 she was one of thirteen RAN rescue boats transferred to the Royal Australian Air Force, and renamed 02-109. She was stationed at Neutral Bay in Sydney, and in Townsville, Queensland.

The boat was sold by the RAAF to private owners in 1985, being the last of her class still in service. In 2011 the boat was acquired by a Melbourne based scuba-diving training company and is undergoing restoration.

Air View is listed on the Australian Register of Historic Vessels.
