= Shadow III =

Shadow III may refer to:

- Shadow III, a knife manufactured by Chris Reeve Knives
- USS Shadow III (SP-102), a United States Navy patrol boat in commission from 1917 to 1919
