= Purdy Boat Company =

The Purdy Boat Company, of Port Washington, Long Island, New York was one of the most famous makers of custom yachts and racing boats in the 1920s and 1930s. The name "Purdy" evokes a bygone era of classic race boats and cruisers custom designed and built by James Gilbert Purdy's sons, Ned and Gil Purdy, and their families. The company and its boats represent an era of New York society comparable to what "Tiffany occupies in the jewelry business."

As T. E. Lawrence (Lawrence of Arabia) wrote in July 1930, "My boat's maker is the Purdy Boat Co [...] and its class name is the Biscayne Baby [...] They are the [...] best things the States have made, I think." One of the Purdy Boat Company's most famous works was the Aphrodite, built for multimillionaire John Hay Whitney. "APHRODITE'S guest list over the years reads like a "Who's Who" in the worlds of government, business and entertainment with such luminaries as Fred Astaire, Sir Laurence Olivier, Spencer Tracy, Katharine Hepburn, Henry Ford II, FDR advisor Harry Hopkins and Nelson Rockefeller aboard for summer day cruises down Long Island Sound. APHRODITE also once served as the site for a birthday party for Shirley Temple."

== History ==
The Purdy Boat Company was founded in 1916 by Indiana entrepreneur Carl Graham Fisher, a noted automobile and boat racing enthusiast, who recognized the talents of brothers Ned and Gil Purdy. Previously, the Purdys had worked at Consolidated Shipbuilding in Morris Heights, New York, where Fisher had become acquainted with their work and subsequently hired them to form a new company. The firm began its operations in Fisher’s shop at the Indianapolis Speedway, before relocating to Miami Beach, Florida, later that same year. In 1919, the company moved briefly to Trenton, Michigan, and then, in 1925, established itself permanently in Port Washington, Long Island, New York, in the Bayview Colony on Manhasset Bay.

The 1920s and 1930s marked a period of substantial growth for the Purdy Boat Company, coinciding with the emergence of New York's "Gold Coast" as a hub for America's wealthy elite. The firm became renowned for crafting custom racing boats and luxury yachts, attracting prominent clients such as Walter P. Chrysler, Carl Fisher, Harold Stirling Vanderbilt, and John Hay Whitney. Their vessels symbolized both technological achievement and social status during an era when bespoke commuter yachts frequently transported owners from their Long Island estates to Wall Street or social outings in the city.

The company's reputation for high-quality craftsmanship and innovation was reinforced by a distinguished clientele and prominent press coverage. The construction of the 74-foot cruiser Aphrodite for financier John Hay Whitney in 1937 stands out as a flagship achievement, both for its technical prowess and the social circles it served, hosting government leaders and celebrities. However, the company also faced challenges, most notably a devastating fire in 1928 that destroyed the Purdy boat-house in Port Washington, resulting in the loss of several luxury vessels including a flying yacht owned by a member of the Vanderbilt family.

During World War II, the Purdy Boat Company contributed to the national effort by building over 80 small craft for the United States Navy. The company closed down around the year 1950.

== See also ==
- USS Raven III (SP-103) and USS Shadow III (SP-102), both civilian motorboats built by Purdy Boat Company, and used as patrol boats for the United States Navy during World War 1.
