= Miami Shipbuilding =

Marine service provider and shipbuilder in Miami, Florida

Coordinates: 25.768056°N 80.197389°W

- Miami Shipbuilding main building
- Industry: Shipbuilding; Marine repair
- Predecessors: Fogal Boat Yard
- Founded: January 1939; 86 years ago
- Defunct: January 1993
- Headquarters: 615 SW 2nd Ave, Miami, Florida, USA
- Area served: US Navy and Miami
- Key people: Jay Fogal, Robert Johnston
- Products: PT Boats, Crash boats, yachts, Hydrofoils
- Services: Boat building and repair

Halobates a 1957 prototype hydrofoil boat, used a US Navy LCVP(H) for a hull, built by Miami Shipbuilding for the US Navy

Miami Shipbuilding, (Miami Shipyards Corp), was boatyard in Miami, Florida founded in 1939. The Miami Shipbuilding was originally called Fogal Boat Yard. Fogal Boat Yard was founded in 1928 by Jay Fogal. Miami Shipbuilding had two boatyard sites one on each side of the Miami River. The main yard was between SW 2nd and 3rd Avenues. Miami Shipbuilding built many crash boats also called Air-Sea Rescue Boat, or ASR for World War II. They are also known for building early prototype PT boats: PT-1 and PT-2.

== History ==
Miami Shipbuilding became the second largest World War II employer in Miami from 1941 to 1945. After the war only the boatyard on the south side of the river was used. Miami Shipbuilding designed the boat known as the Miamis. The Miamis was designed by Dair Long. Miami Shipbuilding main building is known as its Art Moderne office style at 615 SW 2nd Ave was used as the police station on Miami Vice. The Art Moderne office had a large relief panel above the entrance with a man holding up a ship, kneeling in water and surrounded by a ship's helm, propeller, and gear. The site has been a boatyard since 1915. The building was later demolished in 2007, as it was not put on a protected building list. Miami Shipbuilding built 329 Air-Sea Rescue Boat and through its subcontracts 411 more were built, like HMAS Air Faith (909). In all 740 Air-Sea Rescue Boats were built for the war and place around the world to save down airman. Air-Sea Rescue Boat were design to be fast and rough. After the war Miami Shipbuilding built recreational boats and hydrofoils boats. The Hydrofoil Project of the Office of Naval Research had Miami Shipbuilding built a Hydrofoil boat from 1954 to 1957. The prototype hydrofoil boat completed was the Halobates, in 1957 with an U.S. Navy LCVP(H) as the hull. Halobates had water wings and could do more than 40 miles per hour. Steered was by an electronic automatic pilot. Miami Shipbuilding tested the LVHX-2 which used an US Army DUKW for is hull. Robert Johnston was the main designer for Halobates and LVHX-2. Halobates development led to the design of a new boat the Denison a 104-foot, 95-ton hydrofoil, named after its sponsor, Col. Charles R. Denison. HS Denison was built by Grumman in Oyster Bay, Long Island completed June 5, 1962. LVHX-1 was built for the US Marine Corps built by Lycoming Division of AVCO, but tested by Miami Shipbuilding. LVHX-2 built by Food Machinery Corp for US Army with a DUKW for hull, was but tested by Miami Shipbuilding. Miami Shipbuilding closed in the January 1993. The boatyard site today is Latitude on the River Condo and Latitude One International Business Center.

== Crash boats ==
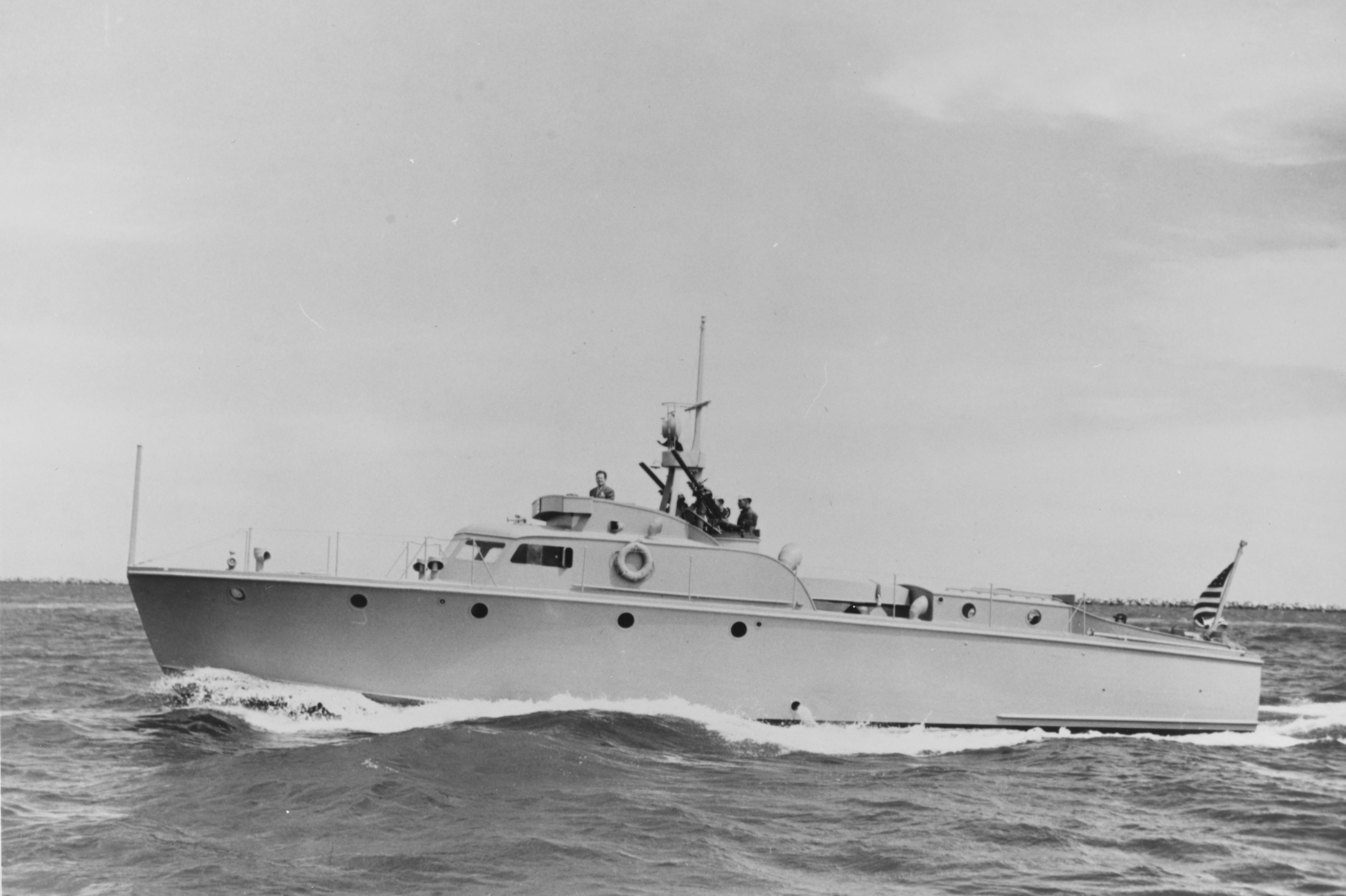
US Navy NH 96504 a 63 ft (19 m) air-sea rescue boat designed by Miami Shipbuilding and built by Fellows & Stewart

Crash boats were wooden high speed boats built to rescue the air crews of downed United States and other Allies airplanes during World War II. Over 300,000 planes were built by America by 1945. This made the need to have crash rescue boat, also called Recovery Craft. These boats were stationed around the world. These boats saved pilots, crew, and passengers from downed aircraft in search and rescue, air-sea rescue missions. Miami Shipbuilding built 23 tons, 63-foot. Other designs were the 104-foot, 85-foot, 42-foot. Most of the Miami Shipbuilding boats were used by the United States Army Air Forces, but the Miami Shipbuilding boats were mostly used by the US Navy. Most of the Miami Shipbuilding boats used in the Pacific War bases across the vast South Pacific. The Pacific War was an Island hopping campaign. Before departing boats were used in the US Navy Small Craft Training Centers for training troops and sea trials.

== PT boats ==
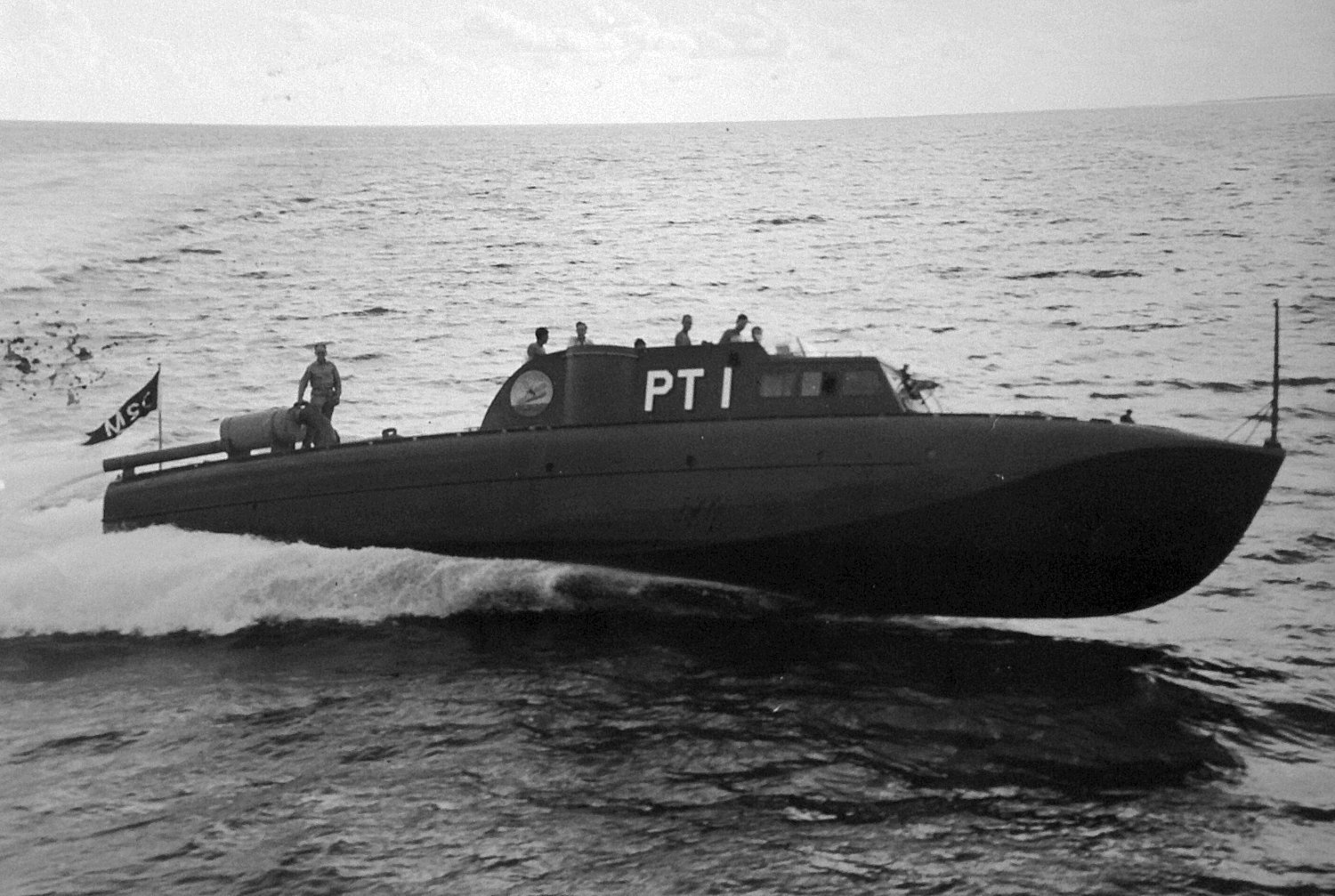
PT-1 (and PT-2) built by Miami Shipbuilding as prototype PT boats in 1941

PT-1 and PT-2 were built by Miami Shipbuildinging in 1941. The to boats were 59-foot US Navy prototype Torpedo Boat. They had a displacement 30 ton and top speed of 30 kts. had two 1,200 hp Vimalert gasoline engines built in Jersey City, New Jersey, with two shafts. George Crouch designed PT-1 and PT-2 in 1939.

- PT-1 was laid down 12 July 1939, launched 16 August 1939, completed 20 November 1941, later renamed Wet Dream and then was reclassified as a Small Boat C-6083 on 24 December 1941. Small Boat was used as a service launch at Naval Station Newport. Later was upgrade to have two Packard 4M-2500 engines.
- PT-2 was laid down 19 August 1939, launched on 30 September 1939, and completed 20 November 1941.

A PT boat contracts give for construction of PT boats. Miami Shipbuildinging had competition against other bulders: Higgins Industries (PT5 and PT6), Fisher Boat Works (PT-3 and PT-4), and Philadelphia Navy Yard (PT-7, PT-8) for 81-foot boats. The PT-1 and PT-2 design was not used in the final production of PT boats, as long and larger boat three engineer designs were used, the 70-foot, 78-foot and 80-foot PT boats.

== Boats ==
- PT Boats:
  - PT-1 built in 1941, 59 foot prototype Torpedo Boat for US Navy, later Small Boat C6083 at Melville Motor Torpedo Boat Squadrons Training Center
  - PT-2 built in 1941, 59 foot prototype Torpedo Boat for US Navy, later Small Boat C6084 at Naval Station Newport
- Crash Boats, 23 tons, 62 feet long:
  - R-1 to R-8 US Navy Crash Boats design 127, built 1941, the 8 boats went to South Africa under Lend-Lease
  - 16 US Navy Crash Boats design 168, built in 1941
  - R-9 to R-19 US Navy Crash Boats design 252 built in 1944, 11 boats went to South Africa under Lend-Lease
- R-10 broken up in 1946 after grounding
  - RPC-1 to PRC-50 US Navy Crash Boats design 293 built in 1943, the 50 boats went to Soviet Union under Lend-Lease
  - P-372 US Navy Crash Boat design 293 later sold as Swan
  - 146 S Navy Crash Boats design 314 built in 1944
  - 20 US Navy Crash Boats design 440, 6 used in US Navy
- Hydrofoil:
  - Halobates 1957 hydrofoil boat, Used a US Navy LCVP(H) for a hull
- Fogal Boat Yard boat:
  - Erma S. 1926 tugboat

== See also ==
- Royal Air Force Marine Branch South Africa use
