= USS Raven III =

Patrol vessel of the United States Navy

History

United States
- Name: USS Raven III
- Namesake: Previous name retained
- Builder: Purdy Boat Company, Miami, Florida
- Completed: 1916
- Acquired: 14 June 1917 (delivered 28 June 1917)
- Commissioned: 5 October 1917
- Renamed: USS SP-103 soon after commissioning
- Fate: Sank 12 September 1919; raised and later sold

General characteristics
- Type: Patrol vessel
- Displacement: 6 tons
- Length: 50 ft (15 m)
- Beam: 9 ft (2.7 m)
- Draft: 2 ft (0.61 m)
- Speed: 27.7 knots
- Complement: 6
- Armament: 1 × 1-pounder gun

USS Raven III (SP-103), later USS SP-103, was an armed motorboat that served in the United States Navy as a patrol vessel from 1917 to 1919.

Raven III was built as a civilian motorboat in 1916 at by the Purdy Boat Company at Miami, Florida. The U.S. Navy purchased her from Purdy on 14 June 1917 for use as a patrol boat during World War I. Purdy delivered Raven III to the Navy on 28 June 1917, and she was commissioned on 5 October 1917 at Key West, Florida, as USS Raven III (SP-103).

Soon after commissioning, Raven III was renamed USS SP-103 and attached to Section 4 of the 7th Naval District's coast defense force as a patrol craft working with the training facility at Key West.

SP-103 sank accidentally on 12 September 1919. She was raised and later sold to Stewart McDonald of the Moon Motor Car Company of St. Louis, Missouri.
