= HMAS Air Faith =

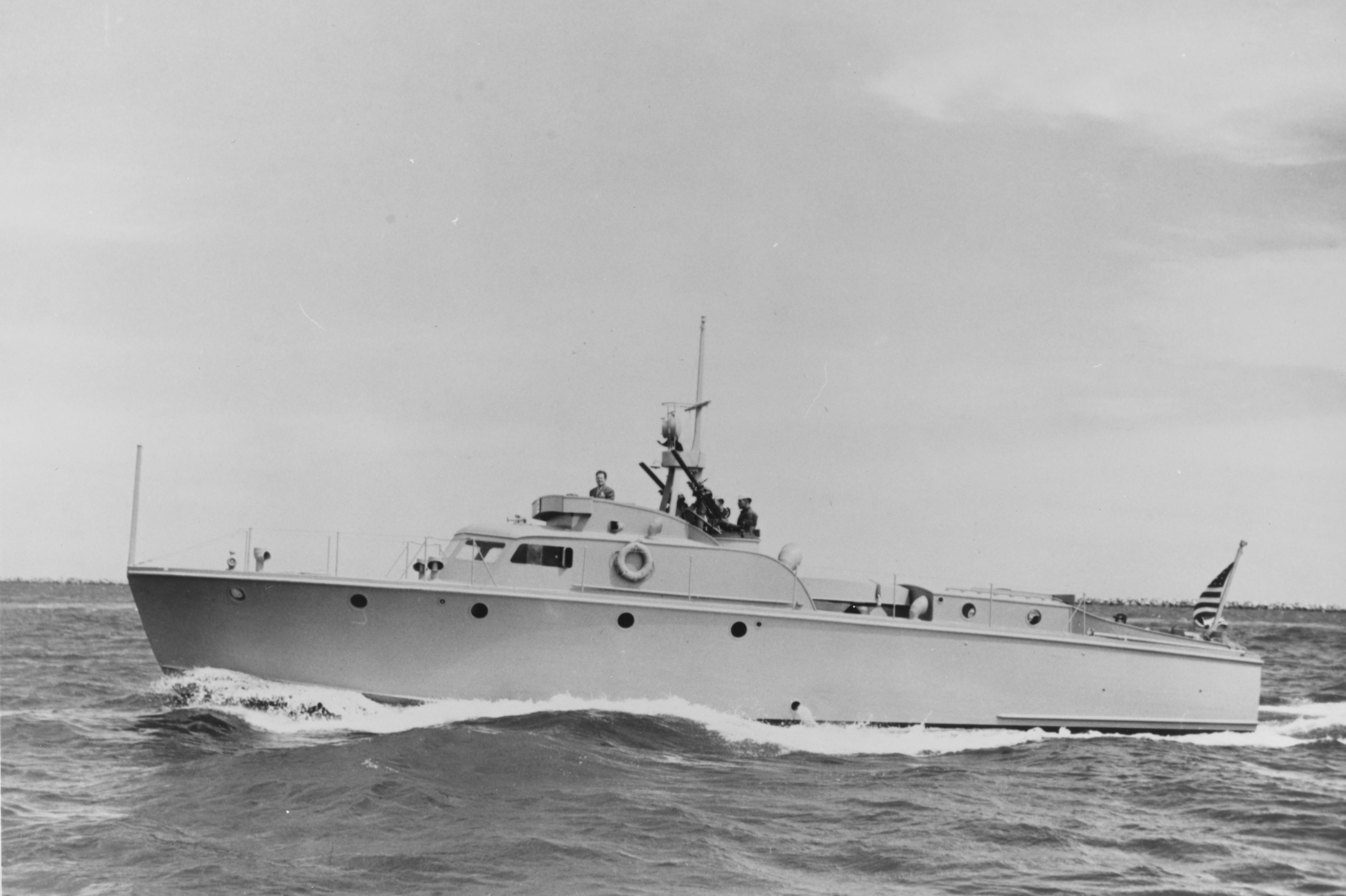

History

Australia
- Name: HMAS Air Faith
- Operator: Royal Australian Navy
- Ordered: 4 March 1944
- Builder: South Coast Company, Newport Beach, California
- Commissioned: 8 February 1945
- Decommissioned: 20 August 1946
- Fate: Transferred to the Royal Australian Air Force in 1949
- Status: Returned to Royal Australian Navy in 1965, sold 1968.

Australia
- Name: 02-101
- Operator: Royal Australian Air Force
- Acquired: 1949
- Fate: Returned to Royal Australian Navy in 1965

Australia
- Name: Air Faith
- Operator: Quayside Charters
- Home port: Sydney

General characteristics
- Class & type: Miami-class air-sea rescue boat
- Displacement: 23 long tons (23 t)
- Length: 63 ft (19 m) o/a
- Beam: 15 ft 4 in (4.67 m)
- Draught: 4 ft (1.2 m)
- Propulsion: 2 × 630 hp (470 kW) Hall-Scott Defender V12 petrol engines
- Speed: 31.5 knots (58.3 km/h; 36.2 mph)
- Endurance: 14.5 hours
- Complement: 7 or 8
- Armament: 2 × twin .50 cal. M2 Browning machine guns

HMAS Air Faith (909) was a Miami-class 63-foot Air-Sea Rescue Boat that was operated by the Royal Australian Navy during World War II, and later by the Royal Australian Air Force.

== Design ==
The Miami class rescue boats were wooden-hulled, and powered by two 630 hp (470 kW) Hall-Scott Defender petrol engines giving a top speed of 31.5 knots. They were armed with two twin .50 calibre M2 Browning machine guns mounted either side of the bridge. The crew comprised one officer in command, a coxswain, two engineers, two seamen and one or two radio operators.

== Service history ==
Air Faith was one of a class of twenty boats ordered on 4 March 1944. They were all Model 314 boats, designed by the Miami Shipbuilding Corporation, of Miami, Florida, but built at a number of shipyards in California. Air Faith was built by South Coast Company in Newport Beach, California, as hull C-26647 and arrived at Sydney aboard the Cecil G. Sellars and was commissioned on 8 February 1945.

Air Faith was placed into reserve on 20 August 1946, and in 1949 she was one of thirteen RAN rescue boats transferred to the Royal Australian Air Force, and renamed 02-101.

The boat was returned to the RAN in 1965, and sold to private interests on 3 July 1968. The boat was sold again in 1972 and has been with the current owner ever since. The boat is moored in Sydney Harbour and has been operating as a charter vessel since 1998. The boat has had major modifications, but the hull is clearly visible as its former air sea rescue style. A superstructure was fitted as a saloon area in the 1980s. The Hall Scott petrol engines were replaced in the 1970s with GM's, and recently with Fiat diesels.
