= USS Secret =

Patrol vessel of the United States Navy

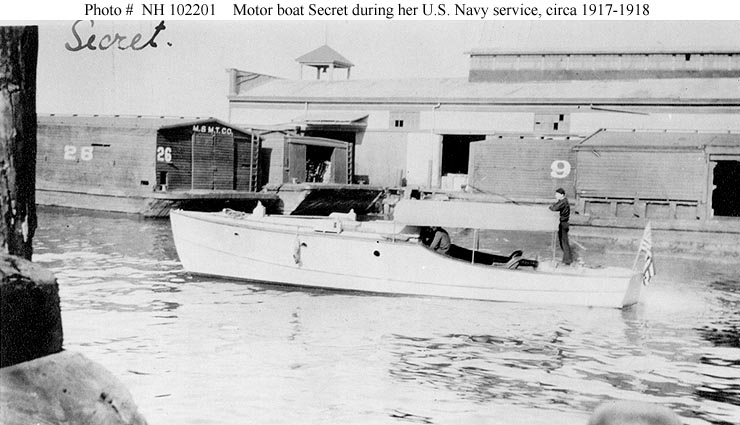
- USS Secret (SP-1063) during World War I. Several barges are in the background.

History

United States
- Name: USS Secret
- Namesake: Previous name retained
- Builder: William E. Haff, New Rochelle, New York
- Completed: 1917
- Acquired: 28 May 1917
- Commissioned: 28 May 1917
- Decommissioned: 30 December 1918
- Fate: Returned to owner 30 December 1918
- Notes: Operated as private motorboat Secret 1916-1917 and from 1918

General characteristics
- Type: Patrol vessel
- Length: 37 ft (11 m)
- Beam: 7 ft 6 in (2.29 m)
- Draft: 2 ft (0.61 m)
- Speed: 22 miles per hour

USS Secret (SP-1063) was a United States Navy patrol vessel in commission from 1917 to 1918.

Secret was built as a private motorboat of the same name in 1916 by William E. Haff at New Rochelle, New York. On 28 May 1917, the U.S. Navy leased her from her owner, John S. Baker of Short Hills, New Jersey, for use as a section patrol boat during World War I. She was commissioned the same day as USS Secret (SP-1063).

Assigned to the 5th Naval District, Secret served as a dispatch boat. She also served as a rescue boat at Naval Air Station Anacostia in Washington, D.C.

Secret was decommissioned on 30 December 1918 and was returned to Baker the same day.

== See also ==
- Crash boats of World War 2
