= AVR 661 =

United States Air Force boat

History
- Name: AVR 661

General characteristics
- Length: 85 ft (26 m)
- Propulsion: 2 × 1,500 hp (1,100 kW) Packard Marine 4M-2500 engines
- Speed: 40 knots (74 km/h; 46 mph)
- Armament: None
- AVR 661
- U.S. National Register of Historic Places
- Location within Chicago metropolitan area Location within Illinois Location within the United States
- Location: Calumet Harbor, Chicago, Illinois
- Coordinates: 41°39′43″N 87°34′30″W
- Built: 1943
- NRHP reference No.: 80001342
- Added to NRHP: November 19, 1980

AVR 661 is an R-1 type United States Air Force "crash boat", a boat used in air-sea rescues. It is 85 feet long and has two Packard Marine 4M-2500 engines of 1500 horsepower, instead of the normal three that PT boats usually were equipped with. It has a top speed of 40 knots. The craft was unarmed normally, but in the event of deployment to hostile areas could have been armed with a variety of light weapons.

These types of boats were used to rescue aircraft crews at sea. The designation AVR was used for "Aircraft Rescue Vessel", so it was one of the small, fast craft, that were used for rescuing pilots from downed planes.

AVR 661 was built in 1943 for the Army Air Corps and served in the Gulf of Mexico during World War II as one of the Crash boats of World War 2.

After the war the Air Force sold many of its crash boats to private parties for use as yachts or commercial vessels. Many others were used as targets and sunk. AVR 661 was kept in active service assigned to Tyndall Air Force Base, near Panama City, Florida. During the Vietnam War, AVR 661 towed targets for helicopter gunship training and anti-mine training as well as to recover drones.

In 1971, the Air Force decided to preserve AVR 661 as one of the last remaining crash boats from World War II. She was to be placed on display at Wright-Patterson Air Force Base, near Dayton, Ohio. That plan was scrapped as the boat was too large for the cargo plane. She was then donated to the PT Boat Museum in Memphis, Tennessee That, too, proved problematic. As she was being run upriver to Memphis, she struck a submerged obstruction and damaged her running gear. Once at Memphis, the boat sank at her moorings.

The US Naval Sea Cadet Corps expressed an interest in salvaging the crash boat. The boat was placed on a barge and shipped to Chicago.

The Sea Cadets' "Chicago Division" restored the boat (including removing the tree that was growing in the engine room) and used it as a training vessel for a short time. Running out of operating funds, they planned donate her to a museum, but donated to the Northern Illinois Sea Scouts for training.
