= Hunt Boat Company =

Shipyard in San Diego, California, United States

Coordinates: 37.9196°N 122.3624°W

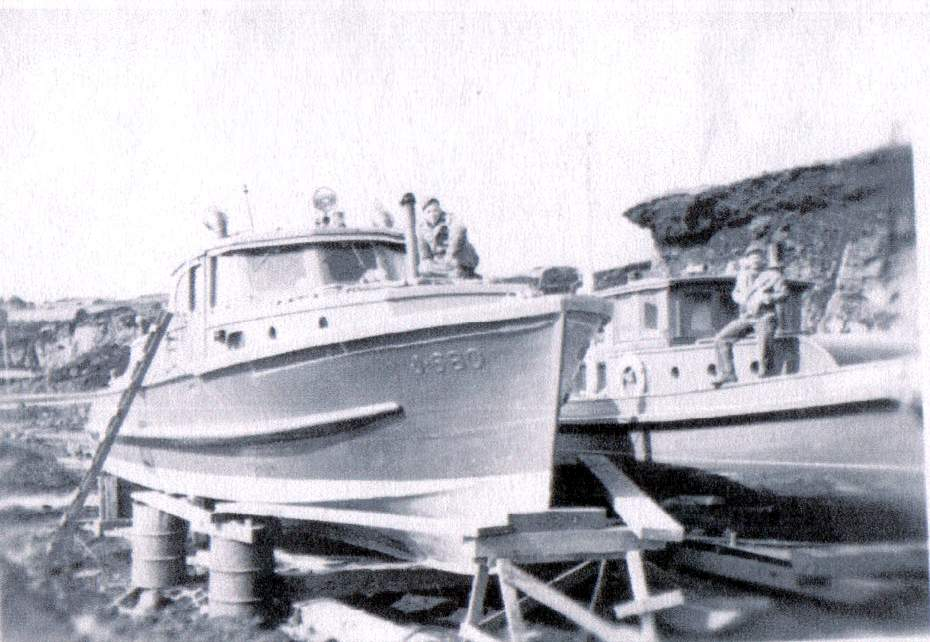
Army Air Forces 42 foot Rescue Boat

Hunt Marine Service and Hunt Boat Company was a wooden shipbuilding company in Richmond, California. To support the World War 2 demand for ships Ackerman Boat Company shipyard switched over to military construction and built 13 craft for the U.S. Army and five craft for the U.S. Navy. These ships were assigned to the Pacific War where they transported supplies and personnel around the island hopping campaign. The shipyard was located at the Richmond Inner Harbor in the same cannel as Kaiser Richmond No. 1 Yard. The address was 790 Wright Ave, Richmond on the Parr Canal. Hunt Boat Company was founded by R. J Hunt a Naval Architect. Before and after the war, Hunt built stock and custom-built speed boats and cabin cruisers. The stock boat was 30-foot cruiser.

== Rescue Boats ==
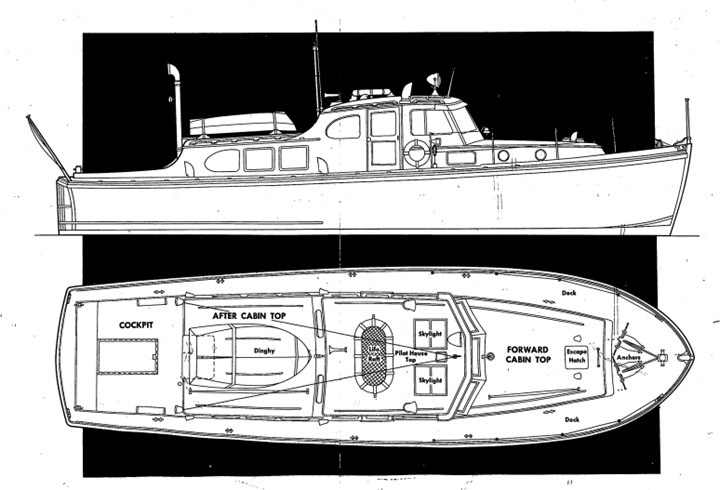
42 foot boats built for U.S. Army

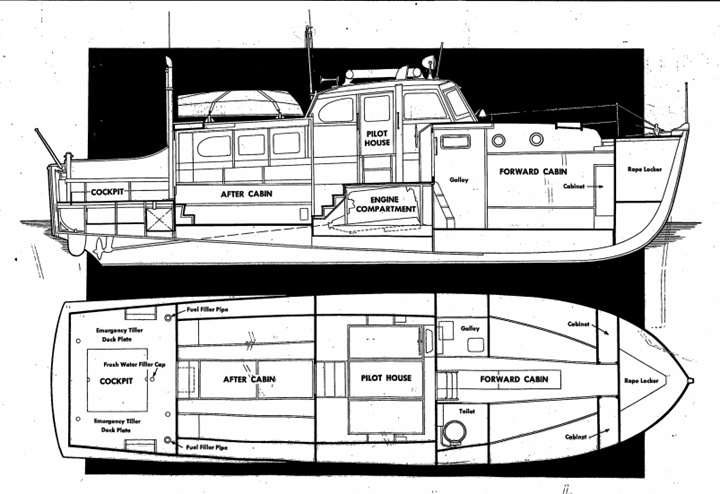
42 foot boats built for U.S. Army, cutaway

Built 42 foot Crash rescue boats for Army Air Forces Air-Sea-Rescue Boat design 221, gasoline-powered, with twin screws, built in 1943. These used two Hall-Scott/Hudson Invader Marine Engine or a Kermath Sea Ranger 6 Marine engine. This was the smallest size Rescue Boats, the large boats were 63 or 85 or 104 feet.

- P-256
- P-257
- P-258
- P-259
- P-260
- P-261 Later renamed Patono

== Patrol boat ==
Built US Army 42 foot, patrol boats and command boats, design 221-B, in 1944 (utility boats), same specs as Crash rescue boats:

- J-1363
- J-1364
- J-1365
- J-1366
- J-1367
- J-1368
- J-1369
- J-1370
- J-1371
- J-1372
- J-1373
- J-1374

== Tugboats ==
Built Army Transportation Service Tugboats Design 329, at 36 feet in 1943. U.S. Army Marine Tractors or Motor Towboat MT:

- MT 383
- MT 384
- MT 385
- MT 386
- MT 387
- MT 388
- MT 389

== See also ==
- California during World War II
- Maritime history of California
