= USS SC-1012 =

World War 2 US Navy subchaser ship

History

United States
- Name: USS SC-1012
- Builder: Fellows & Stewart, Wilmington, California
- Laid down: 7 September 1942, as USS PC-1012
- Launched: 28 December 1942
- Commissioned: 18 August 1943, as USS SC-1012
- Reclassified: SC-1012, 8 April 1943; SCC-1012, 1945
- Fate: Grounded, October 1945; Destroyed, 1 January 1946

General characteristics
- Class & type: SC-497-class submarine chaser
- Displacement: 98 long tons (100 t)
- Length: 110 ft 10 in (33.78 m)
- Beam: 17 ft 11 in (5.46 m)
- Draft: 6 ft 6 in (1.98 m) full load
- Propulsion: 2 × 1,440 bhp (1,074 kW) General Motors 8-268A diesel engines, or 1,540 bhp (1,148 kW) General Motors 16-184A "pancake" engines, 2 shafts
- Speed: 19 knots (35 km/h; 22 mph)
- Range: 1,500 nmi (2,800 km) at 12 kn (22 km/h; 14 mph)
- Complement: 3 officers and 24 enlisted men
- Armament: 1 × 3"/50 caliber gun or Bofors 40 mm gun; 1 or 2 × twin .50 calibre machine guns; 2 or 3 × "K-Gun" depth charge projectors; 14 × depth charges with 6 single release chocks; 2 × Mk.20 Mousetrap anti-submarine mortars (4 × 7.2 in (180 mm) rocket projectiles each)

USS SC-1012 was a submarine chaser in the United States Navy during World War II.

SC-1012 was built by the Fellows & Stewart Shipbuilders and launched on 28 December 1942. Commissioned on 18 August 1943. She was involved in several campaigns during World War II and traveled many miles across and throughout the South Pacific escorting convoys, providing Harbormaster duties and pre-invasion reconnaissance.

== Service history ==
In February 1944, SC-1012 was in a convoy when LST-577 was torpedoed. The escort ships, Coolbaugh (DE-217) and Haas (DE-424) along with SC-1012, formed a Hunter-Killer group and began a systematic search for the submarine which had torpedoed her. No confirmed kill was recorded, but no further offensive action was seen from the submarine.

During the SC-1012's Harbormaster duties, in the Keramerati Island Group, they had just escorted an ammunition ship to dock; when SC-1012 was targeted by a kamikaze. The crew was at battle stations and had just prepared to open fire when the pilot, apparently spotting a better target, broke off his attack and slammed into the ammunition ship, which burned for three or four days.

During the pre-invasion reconnaissance of the islands, Col. "Squeeky" Anderson was the commanding officer for the landing forces. He would routinely board SC-1012 and go with them to map out the landing zones. During the actual invasion, SC-1012 would stand by at a preset location and the landing craft would then home in on her, aiming to the right or the left of where SC-1012 was stationed. This type of "spotting" enabled the landing ships to hit their target without using any other guidance systems.

SC-1012 did not lose any crewmembers to any sort of enemy action. However, she was damaged beyond repair when Typhoon Louise hit the Seaplane Base on Okinawa in October 1945, and the SC-1012 was destroyed on 1 January 1946.
