= Kermath =

Defunct American motor vehicle manufacturer

The Kermath was an automobile built in Detroit, Michigan in 1907. Kermath marine engines were produced from 1916 until the 1950s.

== Automobile ==
The Kermath car was built by James Kermath, who immigrated to the Detroit area from Toronto, Canada. The Kermath Speedaway was a small four-seater runabout with a tear-drop shaped radiator and bonnet. It was offered with a 26 hp, four-cylinder engine with a three-speed transmission and shaft drive. The front axle was tubular.

== Marine Engines ==
Kermath Manufacturing Co. produced marine engines from the 1910s until the 1950s in models from single cylinders to V-12's. The Kermath slogan was "a Kermath always runs". Many engines were advanced for their time, with various models having overhead camshafts, 4 valves per cylinder, and dual magnetos.

Kermath Marine engines were commonly used by Garwood, Chris Craft, and Matthews as well as many other boat builders of the period. During World War II the Army Air Corps used the Kermath V-12, 550 horsepower Sea-Raider to power 104 foot rescue boats out of Sagstad.

== See also ==
- Hunt Boat Company Rescue Boats that used Hall-Scott Invader Marine Engine.
