= USS Seminole (AKA-104) =

Cargo ship of the United States Navy

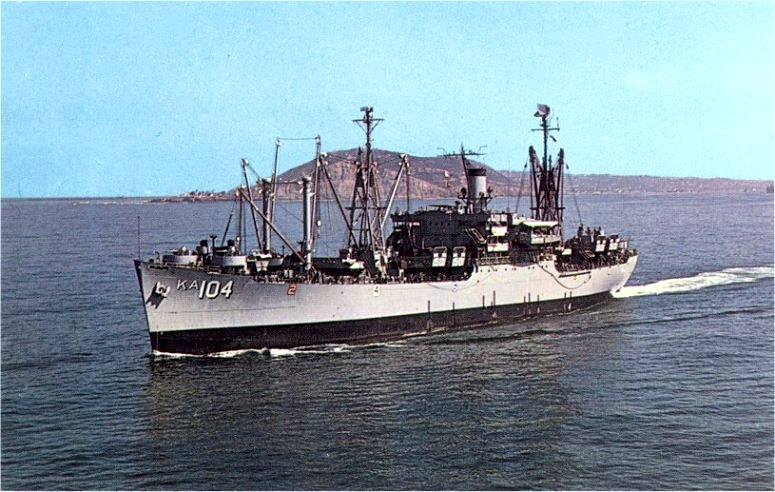

History

United States
- Name: USS Seminole
- Namesake: Seminole County, Florida; Seminole County, Georgia; Seminole County, Oklahoma
- Builder: North Carolina Shipbuilding Company, Wilmington, North Carolina
- Launched: 28 December 1944
- Commissioned: 8 March 1945
- Decommissioned: 23 December 1970
- Reclassified: LKA-104, 1 January 1969
- Stricken: 1 September 1976
- Honors and awards: 6 battle stars (Korea); 6 campaign stars (Vietnam)
- Fate: Sold for scrapping, 16 November 1977

General characteristics
- Class & type: Tolland-class attack cargo ship
- Displacement: 14,160 long tons (14,387 t)
- Length: 459 ft 2 in (139.95 m)
- Beam: 63 ft (19 m)
- Draft: 26 ft 4 in (8.03 m)
- Propulsion: GE geared turbine drive; Single propeller; 6,000 shp (4.5 MW)
- Speed: 16.5 knots (30.6 km/h; 19.0 mph)
- Complement: 425
- Armament: 1 × 5-inch/38-caliber gun; 4 × twin 40 mm guns

USS Seminole (AKA-104/LKA-104) was a Tolland-class attack cargo ship in service with the United States Navy from 1945 to 1970. She was scrapped in 1977.

== History ==
Seminole was named after counties in Florida, Georgia, and Oklahoma. She was built in 1944 as a Type C2-S-AJ3 ship under a Maritime Commission contract (MC hull 1703), by the North Carolina Shipbuilding Company, Wilmington, North Carolina; launched on 28 December 1944; sponsored by Miss Pamela Cole; Commissioned on 8 March 1945, at the Charleston Navy Yard, Charleston, South Carolina, with Lieutenant Commander E. L. Bothwell, Assistant to the Captain of the Yard, in temporary command.

=== World War II, 1945 ===
Following shakedown in Chesapeake Bay from 25 to 28 March 1945, the attack cargo ship operated along the east coast. On 8 April she departed Norfolk for the Panama Canal Zone. Seminole transited the Panama Canal on 14 to 15 April and arrived at Pearl Harbor on 30 April.

From 1 May through 27 May, Seminole engaged in training cruises off the Hawaiian Islands. On 28 May, she got underway for the Marshall Islands and arrived at Eniwetok on 6 June. Seminole independently zigzagged her way to Ulithi, Caroline Islands, from 17 to 21 June, where she loaded anti-tank land mines for Okinawan operations. Arriving at Buckner Bay, Okinawa on 14 July, Seminole unloaded her cargo on 17 July. On 18 July, general quarters were sounded, and the AKA steamed southward to avoid a typhoon. The hazard over by 20 July, Seminole returned to Buckner Bay the following day. She took similar measures during a typhoon warning from 1–3 August.

On 6 August, Seminole departed Buckner Bay for Ulithi, and, in spite of trouble in her fuel lines, arrived on 10 August. On the 13th, she got underway for the Palaus and arrived at Peleliu Island the following day. On the 15th Japan surrendered.

=== Post-war activities, 1945–1950 ===
Seminole loaded cargo at Peleliu and departed on 21 August bound for the Marianas. After anchoring in Saipan Harbor on 24 August, she unloaded cargo there and at Tanapag and Tinian before getting underway for Guam. Seminole remained in Apra Harbor, Guam, from 1–4 September, before sailing for the Philippines.

Seminole entered San Pedro Bay, Leyte, on 8 September; steamed to Guiuan, Samar Island, on September, where she transferred four LCVP's and eight LCM's before steaming to Iloilo, Panay Island, on 12 September.

From 12 to 17 September, Seminole loaded general cargo, ammunition, vehicles, landing craft, and gasoline for the 40th Infantry Division. Then, on 18 September, she got underway for Jinsen, Korea, and anchored there a week later.

Seminole returned to Leyte on 7 October. She remained in Philippine waters, loading cargo at various points, until 18 October when she stood out of San Fernando Harbor, Luzon, for Korea. After unloading equipment and 84 officers and men of the U.S. 6th Infantry Division at Jinsen, Seminole again set out for the Philippines, anchoring in Guiuan Harbor, Samar, on 5 November.

On 1 December, the attack cargo ship departed Leyte Gulf, and arrived in San Francisco, California, on 2 March 1946, after stopping off at Qingdao, Guam, and Pearl Harbor.

During the postwar years from 1946 to 1950, Seminole operated along the west coast, and at Pearl Harbor, Guam, and other Pacific ports.

=== Korean War, 1950–1953 ===
In Puget Sound when war broke out in Korea in the summer of 1950, Seminole and sister ship, Washburn (AKA-108), got underway for Yokosuka, Japan. She changed her course in accordance with a dispatch of 30 August and arrived at Kobe the next day. After voyage repairs at the Mitsubishi dockyards and lashing down for Typhoon Jane, Seminole loaded military cargo and got underway for Pusan, Korea, on 4 September accompanied by Pickaway (APA-222) and Fort Marion (LSD-22). Seminole returned to Kobe that same day in compliance with a confidential dispatch, fueled to capacity, and got underway independently at 0027 on 5 September.

Seminole moored in Pusan Harbor on 6 September. On 8 September, she commenced loading cargo, supplies, and equipment of the 1st Provisional Marine Brigade. Five war correspondents reported on board on 11 September, and 301 U.S. Marines and 58 ROK Marines embarked the next day. On 15 September, Seminole lowered and dispatched her boats for the opposed landings on Red Beach, Inchon. From 16 to 20 September, the AKA continued to offload her cargo. On 21 September, she evacuated six marine casualties and debarked them at Sasebo, Japan, on 23 September.

After repairs to the ship and her boats, Seminole stood out of Kobe on 5 October and arrived at Inchon on 8 October. Seminole began loading troops and equipment of the 1st Marine Division the next day and took on additional troops and cargo until standing out of the harbor on 17 October. Seminole and accompanying ships reversed their course back and forth several times until the mine fields at Wonsan had been cleared. She entered Wonsan Harbor on 25 October and landed marines and offloaded cargo until 30 October.

Seminole departed Wonsan Harbor on 1 November, reaching Pusan the next day. After embarking men of the 65th Regimental Combat Team and the 58th Field Artillery Battalion, she disembarked them at Wonsan on 7 November. Two days later, Seminole got underway for Pusan and sank a mine with fire from small arms and 20 millimeter guns en route. Seminole anchored in Pusan on 10 November, where she loaded troops from X Corps, before getting underway on the next day.

Seminole returned to Wonsan Harbor on 12 November, disembarked the soldiers, and performed upkeep and maintenance until standing out for Japan on 17 November. Seminole arrived at Yokosuka Harbor on 20 November, remaining there until the end of the month. Early in December, the attack transport returned to Korea to evacuate troops who had been endangered by the entry of Chinese communist forces into the war. The ship entered Wonsan Harbor on 4 December, and embarked a platoon of the 3rd Infantry Division and their equipment. From 5–7 December, additional elements of the 3rd Infantry Division, including the Division Band, came on board. On 9 December, Seminole stood into Hŭngnam, Korea. For the remainder of 1950, Seminole completed several trips between Hungnam and Pusan, ferrying Japanese stevedores, as well as 3rd Division and ROK soldiers. Seminole anchored at Kobe Harbor on 29 December.

On 13 January 1951, Seminole stood out of Kobe en route to Korea, anchoring at the Pusan outer harbor the next day. From 23 to 28 January, Seminole transported North Korean and Chinese POW'S from Pusan to Sadung Ni. On 29 January, Seminole interrupted this work to engage in simulated amphibious movements and assault landings along the eastern coast. The ruse, between 29 and 31 January, caused the enemy to deploy his troops where they did not threaten United Nations forces.

Her mission completed, Seminole returned to the ferrying of POW's on 2 February. On 8 February, additional simulated assault landings were made. On 10 February, Seminole departed Inchon for Japan and arrived at Sasebo two days later. She made one more trip to Korea and back that month, returning to Yokosuka Harbor on the 25th.

Seminole departed Sasebo on 4 April, arriving at Hong Kong on the 16th. On 9 July, she stood into San Diego Harbor. Seminole operated along the west coast until 29 November 1952, then she returned to Yokosuka. Departing Yokosuka on 5 December, Seminole resumed her operations in Korean and Japanese waters. On 10 April 1953, Seminole departed Japan as a part of Task Group 90.9 which redeployed the 5th Cavalry Regimental Combat Team from Pusan and Koje Do, Korea, to Otaru, Japan. Arriving at Pusan on 13 April, Seminole loaded vehicles, drivers, and 500 troops before returning to Otaru on the 27th.

Seminole continued her operations in Japanese and Korean waters well after the signing of the truce on 27 July 1953. From 28 July to 12 September, she ferried almost 10,000 North Korean and Chinese POW's in "Operation Big Switch" from Koje Do to Inchon. On 22 September, she departed Asian waters and arrived at San Diego on Columbus Day 1953.

=== Pacific operations, 1954–1970 ===
On 14 September 1954, Seminole departed the west coast. She arrived at Yokosuka on 2 October, Hong Kong on the tenth, and Sasebo on the 29th.

On 30 November 1955, the attack transport ship stood into Subic Bay, Philippines, and arrived at Saigon, Vietnam, on New Year's Eve. After evacuating refugees from North Vietnam and the Tachen Islands, she departed Saigon on 11 January 1956. Seminole returned to Japan, standing into Kobe on the 27th.

Seminole departed Kobe on 6 February and proceeded to Buckner Bay, Okinawa. On 24 February, she departed the Ryukyus for Japan and thence proceeded to San Diego via Pearl Harbor. For the remainder of 1956, Seminole operated along the west coast and Alaska. In January 1957, she again set sail for Yokosuka. Seminole operated off Japan, Okinawa, and Korea until her return to San Diego on 26 September. Back in Yokosuka on 3 July 1958, the AKA remained in East Asian waters until her return to San Diego on 8 December. Seminole continued her active service into the 1960s. On 1 July 1966, Seminole was assigned to Amphibious Squadron 9.

=== Vietnam, 1965–1970 ===
The Seminole began supporting operations in South Vietnam in early 1965. It left San Diego during February 1965 for a two-week training exercise to Hawaii where it was detained for 30 days. It sailed west from Hawaii with 1500 Marines and their cargo to receive orders while underway. Seminole landed these Marines onshore in Vietnam during April 1965 and the ship spent the next eight months in the Vietnam arena before returning to San Diego. Following three months of rest in San Diego Seminole left for another West-Pac tour of ten months during 1966.

On 24 February 1967, the squadron departed Chin Wan, Okinawa, and arrived at Cửa Việt Base on 1 March, embarking Marines for rotation, and arrived at Chin Wan on 13 March. On 14 April Seminole assisted in the rescue of 28 survivors of SS Silver Peak, which had been run aground by typhoon "Violet."

Seminole participated in Operation Beaver Cage, an amphibious and helicopter borne assault in support of the 1st Marine Division from 28 April to 13 May. Planning commenced immediately for Operation Beau Charger, an amphibious and helicopter assault for a search and destroy operation near the DMZ. This operation, executed 18–22 May, inflicted losses upon the enemy in an area he had considered his sanctuary.

On 18 June, Operation Beacon Torch was launched near Hội An. After disrupting enemy base areas, fortifications, and lines of communications, the 5th Marine Regiment was withdrawn on 2 July and inserted just south of the DMZ to help counter an urgent North Vietnamese threat in Operation Bear Track, 4 July through the 17th. Three days later, Operation Bear Chain was launched against enemy strongholds south of Huế, terminating on 25 July. A short duration, surprise amphibious assault in the vicinity of Huế, was followed by a search and destroy sweep inland, Operation Kangaroo Kick.

Seminole next headed for a much-needed upkeep period, arriving at Subic Bay on 5 August. The last operation of this deployment came on 27 August with an amphibious landing near Quang Tri. Operation Belt Drive, as it was named, came to a successful completion on 5 September and deterred enemy terrorism over the election period. Seminole's unit departed Vietnamese waters on 1 September, however, to return to the United States west coast, via Hong Kong and Subic Bay. She arrived at her homeport, San Diego, on 21 September.

From 24 April to 3 May 1968, Seminole participated in fleet exercise "Beagle Leash" off the California islands of Coronado and San Clemente. On 1 August, Seminole participated in a joint convoy exercise while in transit from San Diego to Pearl Harbor.

On 10 October, during an upkeep period in Subic Bay, Seminole relieved USS Merrick. On the 23rd, she entered Kaoshiung for a port visit. On the 28th, Seminole proceeded independently to join the ARG in Da Nang on the 30th. She was detached on 13 November for a round-trip voyage to Singapore and rejoined the task group on the 26th. Seminole got underway for Hong Kong on 6 December, arriving two days later.

After spending Christmas in Hong Kong, Seminole stood out of the harbor on 27 December 1968, to rejoin her unit off the Vietnamese coast near Da Nang.

Seminole was redesignated LKA-104 on 1 January 1969.

On 12 January, Seminole's squadron participated in the Mộ Đức demonstration. Seminole remained in the Mộ Đức area alone to continue the demonstration, thus missing Operation Bold Mariner, the largest amphibious operation since the Inchon landings. On 6 February, the LKA offloaded Seatail material and steamed singly for Yokosuka on the 14th. Amphibious Squadron 9 rejoined Seminole at Yokosuka on the 26th.

On 14 July, Seminole grounded on Puget Shoals after a port visit in the Olympia, Washington, area. She rejoined Amphibious Squadron 9 at Buckner Bay on 1 December. The squadron got underway for Subic Bay the next day and finished the year in upkeep.

Following additional upkeep, training, and an amphibious demonstration for students and faculty from the Vietnamese Defense College, Seminole departed Subic Bay on 25 January 1970 for Vietnam and Operation Keystone Bluejay. The ship completed loading marines and equipment on 29 January and delivered them to San Diego on 24 February.

=== Decommissioning ===
On 23 September, in her 25th year of active service, Seminole was transferred to the Inactive Ship Facility, San Diego. She was placed out of commission in reserve on 23 December 1970.

== Awards ==
Seminole received six battle stars for service in the Korean War and six campaign stars for service in Vietnam.
