= USS Shadow III =

Patrol vessel of the United States Navy

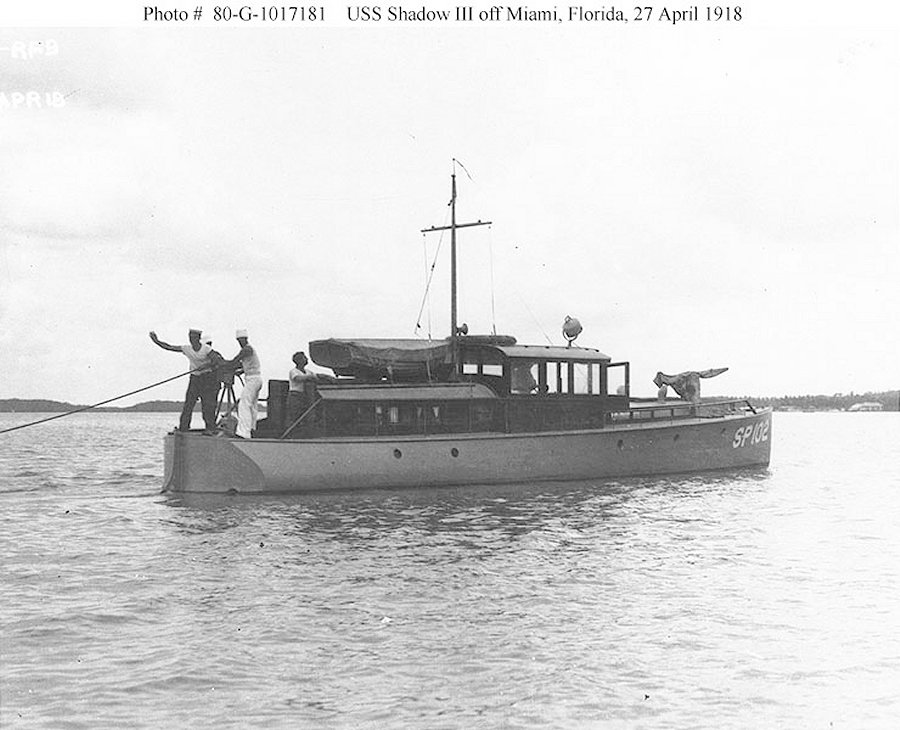
- USS Shadow III off Miami, Florida, on 27 April 1918.

History

United States
- Name: USS Shadow III
- Namesake: Previous name retained
- Builder: Purdy Boat Company, Miami, Florida
- Completed: 1916
- Acquired: 12 June 1917
- Commissioned: 4 September 1917
- Decommissioned: 25 January 1919
- Fate: Sold 5 August 1921

General characteristics
- Type: Patrol vessel
- Displacement: 6 tons
- Length: 50 ft (15 m)
- Beam: 9 ft (2.7 m)
- Draft: 2 ft (0.61 m)
- Speed: 27.7 knots
- Complement: 6
- Armament: 1 × 1-pounder gun; 2 × machine guns

USS Shadow III (SP-102) was an armed motorboat that served in the United States Navy as a patrol vessel from 1917 to 1919.

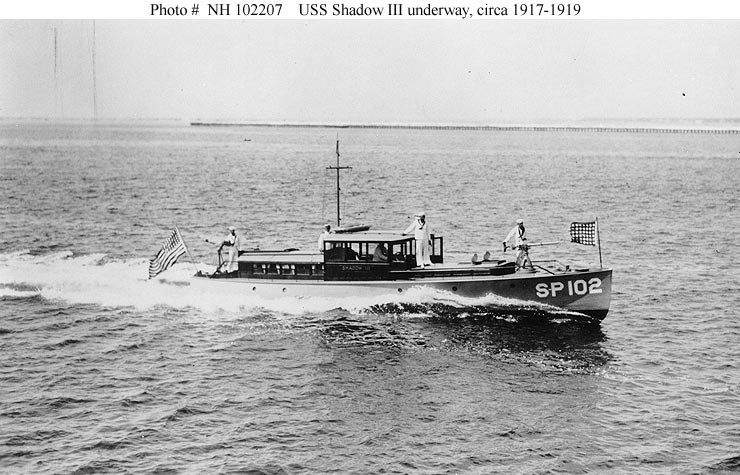
USS Shadow III underway.

Shadow III was built as a civilian motorboat in 1916 by the Purdy Boat Company, at Miami, Florida. The U.S. Navy purchased Shadow III from Purdy on 12 June 1917 for use as a patrol boat during World War I. She was commissioned on 4 September 1917 as USS Shadow III (SP-102).

Shadow III patrolled the Florida coast off Miami during World War I. After the war, she acted as an aircraft crash boat for Naval Air Station Miami, Florida.

Shadow III was decommissioned at Miami on 25 January 1919. The Navy delivered her to the Parris Island Marine Corps Base at Parris Island, South Carolina, on 1 August 1919 for further non-commissioned service.

In December 1919, Shadow III was taken to the Charleston Navy Yard at Charleston, South Carolina, for survey. She was sold on 5 August 1921 to Mike Letiff of Charleston.

== See also ==
- Crash boats of World War 2
