= Blue Bird K3 =

Hydroplane powerboat

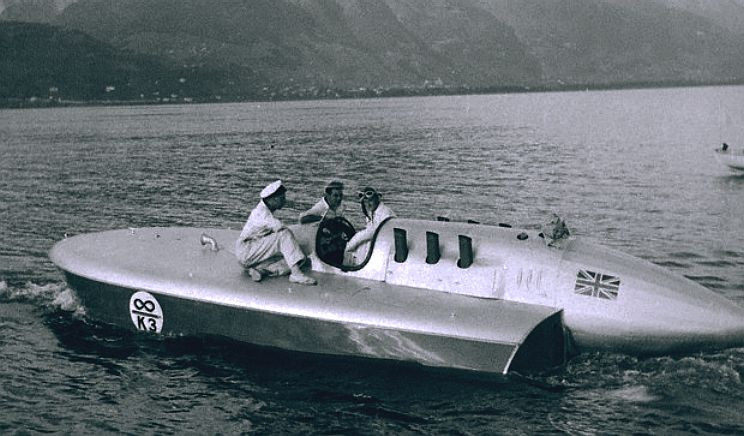
Campbell and the K3, in Switzerland (Locarno), 1937

Blue Bird K3 is a hydroplane powerboat commissioned in 1937 by Sir Malcolm Campbell, to rival the Americans' efforts in the fight for the world water speed record. She set three world water speed records, first on Lake Maggiore in September 1937, then later twice raising her own record.

The name "K3" was derived from its Lloyd's unlimited rating, and was carried in a prominent circular badge on the forward hull.

== Design ==
After Campbell's achievement of the 300 mph land speed record with Blue Bird in 1935 he retired from advancing the land speed record. Shortly afterwards he switched his attentions to the water speed record, at that time dominated by the American Gar Wood.

Blue Bird K3 was designed by Fred Cooper and built by Fred Goatley of Saunders-Roe. The design was intended to be the smallest possible hull capable of carrying the Rolls-Royce R racing engine. Campbell had already used this engine in his Blue Bird car, and they had also been used in pairs in Segrave and Kaye Don's Miss England boats. Of the three individual R engines used by K3, one had previously run in Blue Bird and one in Miss England II.

The most compact layout placed the engine behind the driver and relied on a front-mounted v-drive gearbox to reverse the direction of the drive shaft and increase the shaft revolutions 1:3 to 9,000 rpm. This gearbox, along with much of the mechanical design, was designed by Reid Railton who had previously designed cars for Campbell.

Unlike Gar Wood's multi-engined monsters, Blue Bird was designed for a single engine, and the smallest possible craft to carry it. She was 23 feet (7.0 m) long with a beam of 9 feet 6 inches (2.9 m), compared to 38 feet for Miss America X. Her estimated top speed on paper was to be 130 mph. It was usual at this time for English hydroplanes to have their engines mounted as far astern as possible (Gar Wood disagreed, and had pointed this out to Segrave). In Cooper's usual style, the hull was wide and low, with a narrow, rounded, central superstructure. The engine was placed right back to the transom and the superstructure was extended rearwards in a fabric-covered overhanging conical nacelle. This rearward weight distribution encouraged planing, but could lead to some peculiar attitudes when setting off at slow speeds, as the whole boat appeared to be sinking by the stern. The displacement was only 4,945 pounds (2,243 kg) and the engine alone weighed 1,640 pounds (740 kg).

Construction was of plywood, although the attention paid to weight-saving was such that this was laminated to order from varying numbers of veneers, rather than sawn from factory-made standard sheets. The frames are formed of single-piece unjointed sheets of 7-ply, the hull skins of 5-ply and the deck of 6-ply. Even the engine bearers were made of a central plywood box girder. Reserve buoyancy in the event of an accident was provided by 36,000 ping pong balls, sewn into pillow cases.

== Records ==
On 1 September 1937, on the Lake Maggiore near Locarno, in Switzerland, Blue Bird set a record of 126.32 mph, breaking Gar Wood's previous 5-year-old record. The next day it improved the record to 129.5 mph. For these records Sir Malcolm Campbell was supported on site by the Società Canottieri Locarno (Locarno Rowing Club), that offered help and assistance in the operations. Following the events, Campbell donated a Cup to the Locarno Rowing Club as a sign of gratitude, which is still kept in the club's boathouse.

Breaking the design speed of 130 would require another year, when on 17 August 1938 at Lake Hallwyl in Switzerland, a new record at 130.91 mph (210.63 km/h) was set.

== Ventnor "three pointer" ==
Despite these records, Campbell was dissatisfied with their small margin over the previous record (6 mph). K3's hull was a single-step hydroplane, as already used for Miss England. This lifted half of the hull clear of the water, reducing drag upon it. A new idea from America was the 'three point' hydroplane (known as the 'Ventnor Three Pointer' due to the form being popularised by the Ventnor Boat Works, New Jersey USA), where the forward hull is divided into two sponsons and the boat rides at speed on just these and the transom. This reduces the wetted area (and drag) still further, while increasing stability at speed. It was not possible to convert K3 to this hull form, so Campbell began work on a whole new boat, K4, re-using the same engine.

== Restoration ==
The original boat was restored at Filching Manor in East Sussex and is now in working order. The boat was stripped down and fully rebuilt using parts to the original standard, though the engine is a Rolls-Royce Meteor, an unsupercharged version of the Merlin developed for use in tanks, rather than the larger, supercharged Rolls-Royce R originally used.

It ran on the regatta course at Henley-on-Thames during the Traditional Boat Festival on 18–19 July 2015.

In 2018 an expedition brought Blue Bird K3 back to Locarno, where the first and second records were set in 1937, on the Lake Maggiore.

== Sources ==
- Fox, Uffa (1985) [1937]. "31: Bluebird". Racing, Cruising and Design. London: Peter Davies. pp. 172–174. ISBN 0907069150.
- Harris, Fred (2000). Skimming the Surface. Ainsdale Press.
- Tremayne, David (2005). Donald Campbell: The Man Behind the Mask. Bantam Books. ISBN 0-553-81511-3.
- Villa, Leo (1976). The World Water Speed Record.
