= Thunderbolt (car) =

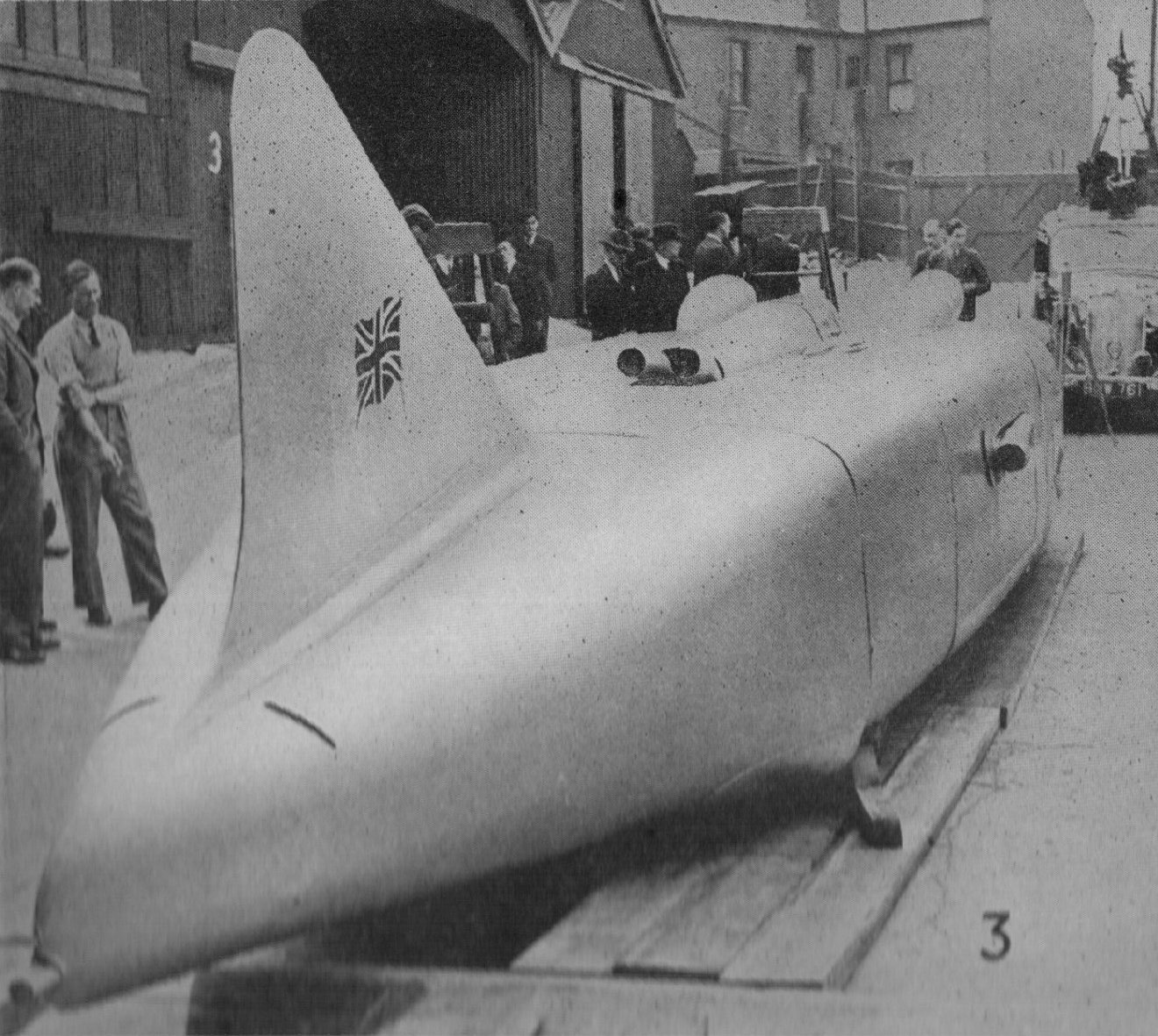

Overview
- Manufacturer: Bean Cars of Tipton
- Production: 1

Body and chassis
- Body style: land speed record car
- Layout: twin steering front axles, single driven rear axle with twin-wheels

Powertrain
- Engine: Twin Rolls-Royce R V-12 aero engines
- Transmission: Coupled gearbox and single final drive

Dimensions
- Kerb weight: 7 tons

Thunderbolt was a British Land Speed Record holder of the 1930s, driven by Captain George E.T. Eyston.

== Records held ==
Between 1937 and 1939, the competition for the Land Speed Record was between two Englishmen: Captain Eyston and John Cobb. Thunderbolt's first record was set at 312.00 mph (502.12 km/h) on 19 November 1937 on the Bonneville Salt Flats. Within a year Thunderbolt returned with improved aerodynamics and raised its record to 345.50 mph (556.03 km/h) on 27 August 1938.

This record only stood for a matter of weeks before John Cobb's Reid-Railton broke the 350 mph (560 km/h) barrier and raised it to 353.30 mph (568.58 km/h) on 15 September 1938, as Eyston watched. This inspired him to take Thunderbolt to a new record of 357.50 mph (575.34 km/h). Cobb had held the record for less than 24 hours.

Eyston and Thunderbolt held the record for almost a year, until Cobb took it again at a speed of 369.70 mph (594.97 km/h) on 23 August 1939. This was the last record attempt before the outbreak of the Second World War. Although Cobb returned after the war and further developed his car to exceed 400 mph (640 km/h), Thunderbolt never attempted the record again.

== Design ==
The leading Land Speed Record cars of the period had taken two approaches to obtaining power; using either the latest and most sophisticated aero-engines available or combining multiple engines. Thunderbolt used both techniques to produce an unprecedentedly powerful car. In its day, terms like "leviathan" and "behemoth" were commonly used to describe the 7-ton car, over twice the weight of its competitors.

The engines were a pair of Rolls-Royce R-type V-12 aero engines, as previously used singly in Malcolm Campbell's Blue Bird of 1933. In fact, one of Eyston's spare engines for the record attempts was on loan from Campbell. There were so few of these engines built (around 20) that many of them had illustrious careers over several different records. One of the Thunderbolts had already powered the Schneider Trophy winner. Each engine was of 36.5 litres capacity, supercharged, and had an individual output power of 2,350 bhp (1,752 kW; 2,383 PS). Handling all this power through a single driven axle required great innovation in metallurgy and in manufacturing the geartrain, as well as water-cooling the completed transmission.

The chassis and bodyshell were built at the Bean works in Tipton. There were three axles and eight tyres. The two leading axles steered and were of different track, so that each tyre ran on a clean surface rather than following a rut. The driven rear axle used twin tyres to reduce the load on them, a technique already used by Bluebird. Separate panels of polished silver Birmabright, a new aluminium alloy, clad the chassis. The body never had the aerodynamic refinement of the Railton Special and was distinctly blocky in appearance. At the rear was a large triangular tailfin, flanked by a pair of hydraulically activated air brakes.

=== Design changes ===
When first built there was a large eight-sided cooling air intake at the front, replaced by a smaller oval intake for the 1938 season. Another improvement for this second attempt was to paint a matte black arrow onto the side of the car. During the first attempts, the new photo-electric timing equipment had failed to detect the polished aluminium car body against the brilliant white salt.

For the 1939 attempts, the streamlining was increased further. Cooling was now by a tank of melting ice rather than a radiator (as used first by Golden Arrow). A rounded nose now filled the previous radiator air intake and the stabilising fin was removed, all leading to an appearance more like Cobb's Railton.

== Fate of Thunderbolt ==
Thunderbolt was displayed in the British Pavilion at the New Zealand Centennial Exhibition in 1939–40, and also toured New Zealand during the Second World War, but is thought to have been destroyed by a fire in a Rongotai warehouse.

Another surviving engine can be seen in the Science Museum in London.
