= Lloyd's unlimited rating =

Hydroplane speed rating

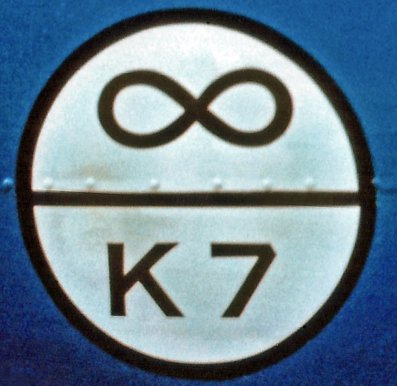
K7 badge, as applied to Bluebird K7

Royal Yachting Association unlimited hydroplane rating is a rating applied to hydroplanes competing for the water speed record, as applied by the RYA. It is usually denoted by a circular white badge on the hull, with an infinity symbol "∞" above the K and number for RYA "unlimited" hydroplane group.

The group has included:

	Boat	Driver
K1	Miss England III	Henry Segrave; Kaye Don
K2	Miss Britain III	Hubert Scott-Paine
K3	Blue Bird K3	Malcolm Campbell
K4	Blue Bird K4 renamed Bluebird K4	Malcolm Campbell; Donald Campbell
K5	White Hawk	Frank Hanning-Lee
K6	Crusader	John Cobb
K7	Bluebird K7	Donald Campbell
K8	British Pursuit	Tony Fahey
