= Rolls-Royce R =

1929 British aero engine

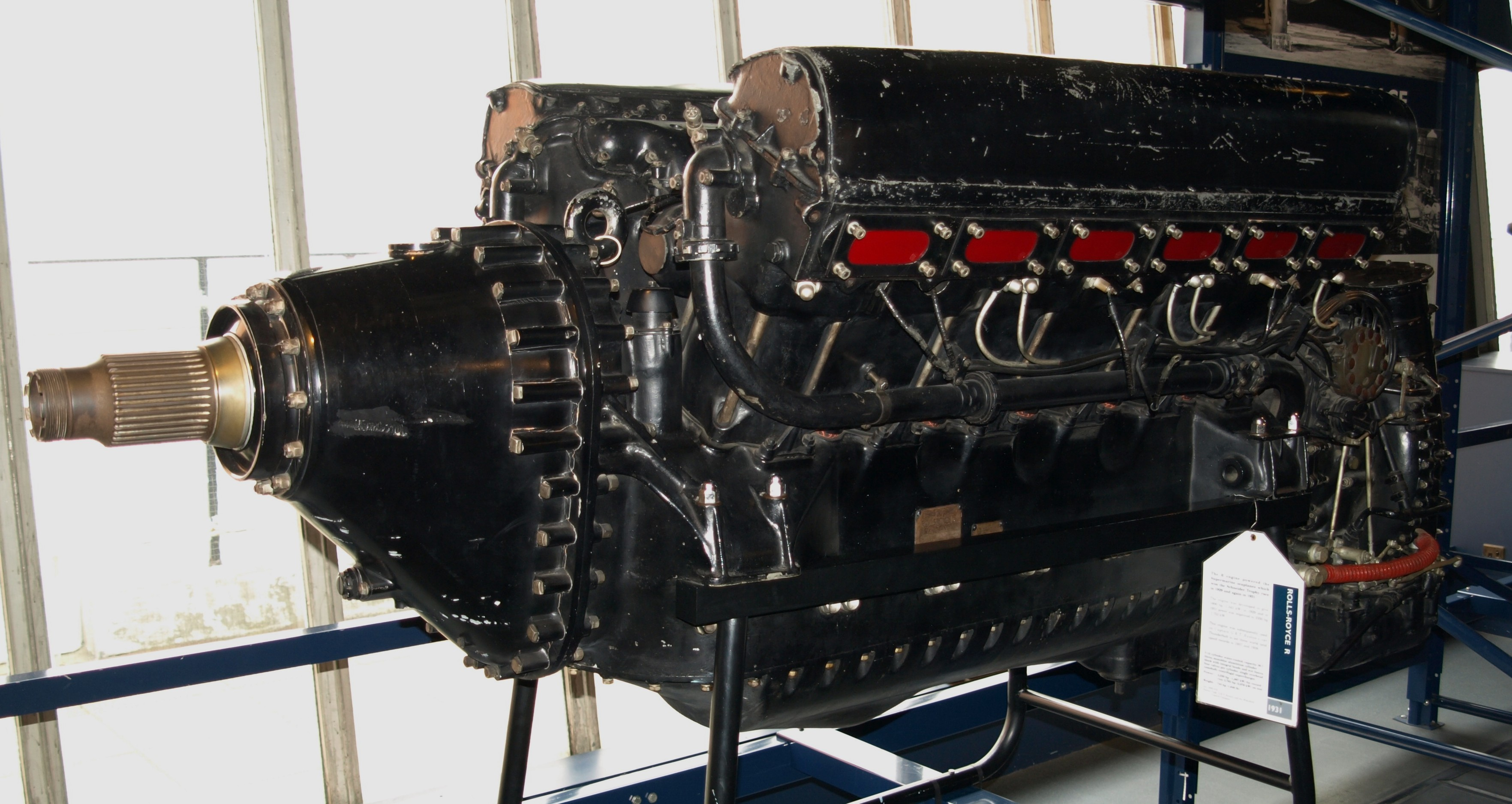
- Rolls-Royce R (R27) on display at the London Science Museum. The rectangular red objects are the exhaust ports blanking plates which would be replaced by the exhaust stubs/pipes when fitted to an aircraft or other vehicle
- Type: Piston V12 aero engine
- Manufacturer: Rolls-Royce Limited
- Designer: Arthur Rowledge
- First run: 7 April 1929
- Major applications: Supermarine S.6; Supermarine S.6B; Blue Bird K4
- Number built: 19
- Developed from: Rolls-Royce Buzzard

The Rolls-Royce R is a British aero engine that was designed and built specifically for air racing purposes by Rolls-Royce Limited. Nineteen R engines were assembled in a limited production run between 1929 and 1931. Developed from the Rolls-Royce Buzzard, it was a 37-litre (2,240 cu in) capacity, supercharged V12 capable of producing just under 2,800 horsepower (2,100 kilowatts), and weighed 1,640 pounds (740 kg). Intensive factory testing revealed mechanical failures which were remedied by redesigning the components, greatly improving reliability.

The R was used with great success in the Schneider Trophy seaplane competitions held in England in 1929 and 1931. Shortly after the 1931 competition, an R engine using a special fuel blend powered the winning Supermarine S.6B aircraft to a new airspeed record of over 400 miles per hour (640 km/h). Continuing through the 1930s, both new and used R engines were used to achieve various land and water speed records by such racing personalities as Sir Henry Segrave, Sir Malcolm Campbell and his son Donald, the last record being set in 1939. A final R-powered water speed record attempt by Donald Campbell in 1951 was unsuccessful.

The experience gained by Rolls-Royce and Supermarine designers from the R engine was invaluable in the subsequent development of the Rolls-Royce Merlin engine and the Spitfire. A de-rated R engine, known as the Griffon, was tested in 1933, but it was not directly related to the production Rolls-Royce Griffon of 1939, of the same exact bore/stroke and resultant displacement figures as the "R" design. Three examples of the R engine are on public display in British museums as of 2014.

== Design and development ==
=== Origin ===
Rolls-Royce realised that the Napier Lion engine used in the 1927 Supermarine S.5 Schneider Trophy winner had reached the peak of its development, and that for Britain's entrant in the next race to be competitive a new, more powerful engine design was required. The first configuration drawing of the "Racing H" engine, based on the Buzzard, (Note: The Buzzard was itself a 6:5 scaled-up Rolls-Royce Kestrel.) was sent to R. J. Mitchell of Supermarine on 3 July 1928, allowing Mitchell to start design of the new S.6 Schneider Trophy seaplane. Shortly after this the engine's name was changed to R for "Racing". An official British Government contract to proceed with the project was not awarded until February 1929, leaving Rolls-Royce six months to develop the engine before the planned Schneider Trophy competition of that year. (Note: Cost: £5,800, the price paid by Malcolm Campbell to Rolls-Royce for R37 in 1933.)

=== Description ===
The R was a physically imposing engine designed by a team led by Ernest Hives and including Cyril Lovesey, Arthur Rowledge and Henry Royce. The R shared the Buzzard's bore, stroke and capacity, and used the same 60-degree V12 layout. A new single-stage, double-sided supercharger impeller was designed along with revised cylinders and strengthened connecting rods. The wet-liner cylinder blocks, (Note: "Wet liners" are formed separately from the main cylinder block casting so that liquid coolant is free to flow around their outsides. As a result, wet-lined cylinders have better cooling and a more even temperature distribution.) crankcase and propeller reduction gear castings were produced from "R.R 50" aluminium alloy; and because of the short life expectancy of these engines, forged aluminium was used to replace bronze and steel in many parts.

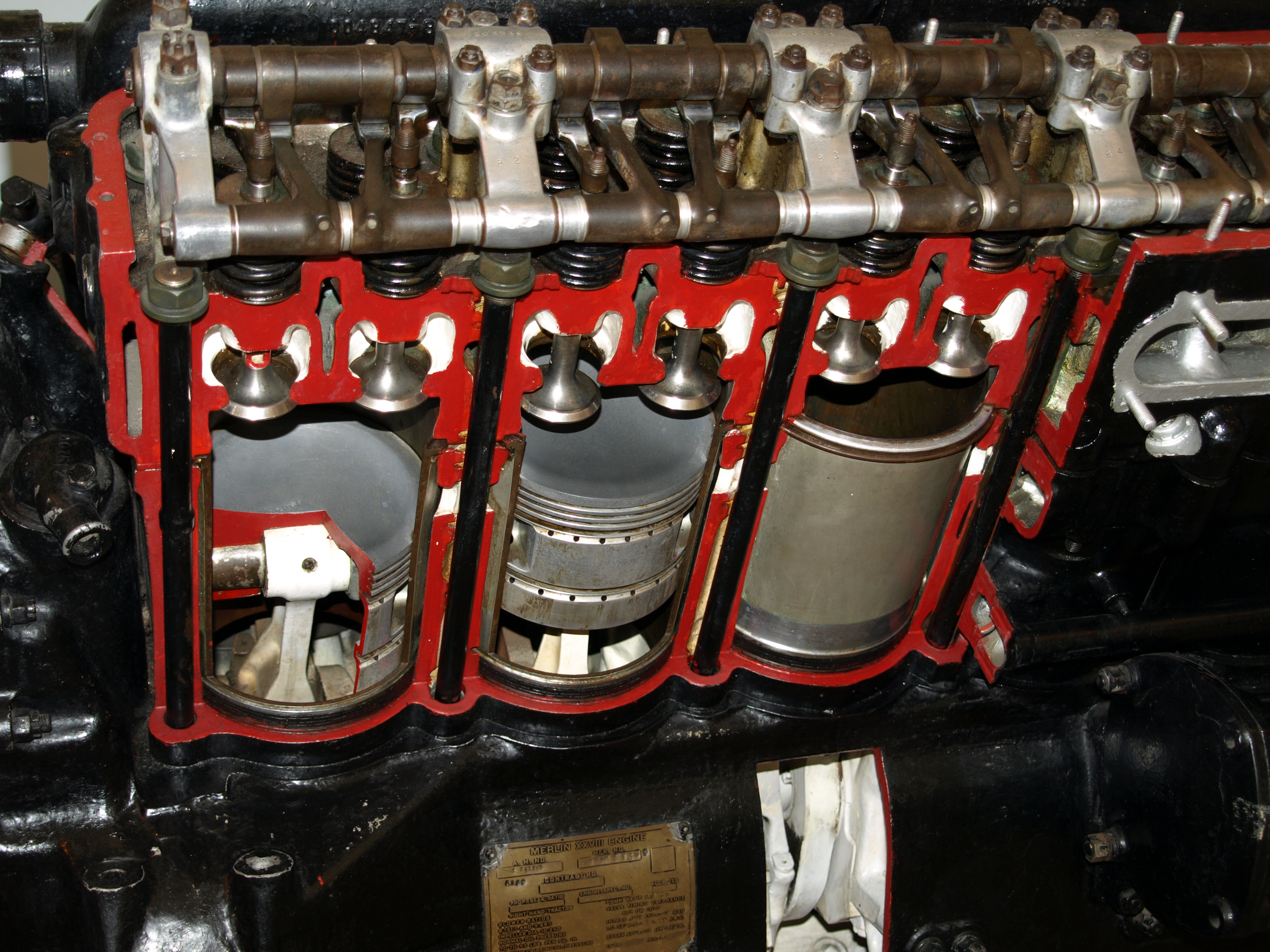
Sectioned view of a Rolls-Royce Merlin which featured wet-liner cylinders and lower oil scraper rings, both originally developed for the R engine

To make the R as compact as possible, several design modifications were made in comparison to the Buzzard: the propeller reduction gear housing was reshaped, and the camshaft and rocker covers were modified to fair into the shape of the aircraft's nose, the air intake was positioned in the vee of the engine (which also helped to avoid the ingress of spray), and beneath the engine the auxiliaries were raised a little to reduce the depth of the fuselage. The engine's length was minimised by not staggering its cylinder banks fore and aft, which meant that the connecting rods from opposing cylinders had to share a short crankshaft bearing journal. This was initially achieved with a blade-and-fork connecting rod arrangement; however, after cracking was found during testing in 1931, the rod design was changed to an articulated type.

The introduction of articulated connecting rods was regarded as a "nuisance" by Arthur Rubbra, a Rolls-Royce engine designer, as there were inherent problems with the arrangement. The complicated geometry meant that a pair of rods had different effective lengths, giving a longer stroke on the articulated side; consequently the cylinder liners on that side had to be lengthened to prevent the oil scraper ring from running out of the cylinder skirt. Articulated rods were used in the Goshawk engine, but were not embodied in the later Rolls-Royce Merlin, for which Arthur Rowledge had designed a revised blade and fork system.

Later production R engines featured sodium-filled exhaust valve stems for improved cooling, while additional modifications included a redesigned lower crankcase casting and the introduction of an oil scraper ring below the piston gudgeon pin; a measure that was carried over to the Merlin engine. A balanced crankshaft was introduced in May 1931, and the compression ratio on the "sprint" engines prepared for that year was raised from 6:1 to 7:1.

The ignition system consisted of two rear-mounted, crankshaft-driven magnetos, each supplying one of a pair of spark plugs fitted to each cylinder. This is common practise for aero engines, as it ensures continued operation in the case of a single magneto failure, and has the advantage of more efficient combustion over a single spark plug application.

=== Cooling ===
Cooling this large engine whilst minimising aerodynamic drag posed new challenges for both the Rolls-Royce and Supermarine design teams. Traditional cooling methods using honeycomb-type radiators were known to cause high drag in flight; consequently it was decided to use the surface skins of the S.6 wings and floats as heat exchangers, employing a double-skinned structure through which the coolant could circulate. Engine oil was cooled in a similar manner using channels in the fuselage and empennage skins. The S.6 was described at the time as a "flying radiator", and it had been estimated that this coolant system dissipated the equivalent of 1,000 hp (750 kW) of heat in flight. However, even with this system in use, engine overheating was noted during the race flights, requiring the pilots to reduce the throttle setting to maintain a safe operating temperature.

A not-so-obvious cooling measure was the deliberate use of a rich fuel mixture, which accounts for the frequent reports of black smoke seen issuing from the engine exhaust stubs. Although this robbed the engine of some power, it increased reliability and reduced the possibility of detonation in the cylinders.

=== Supercharger and fuel ===
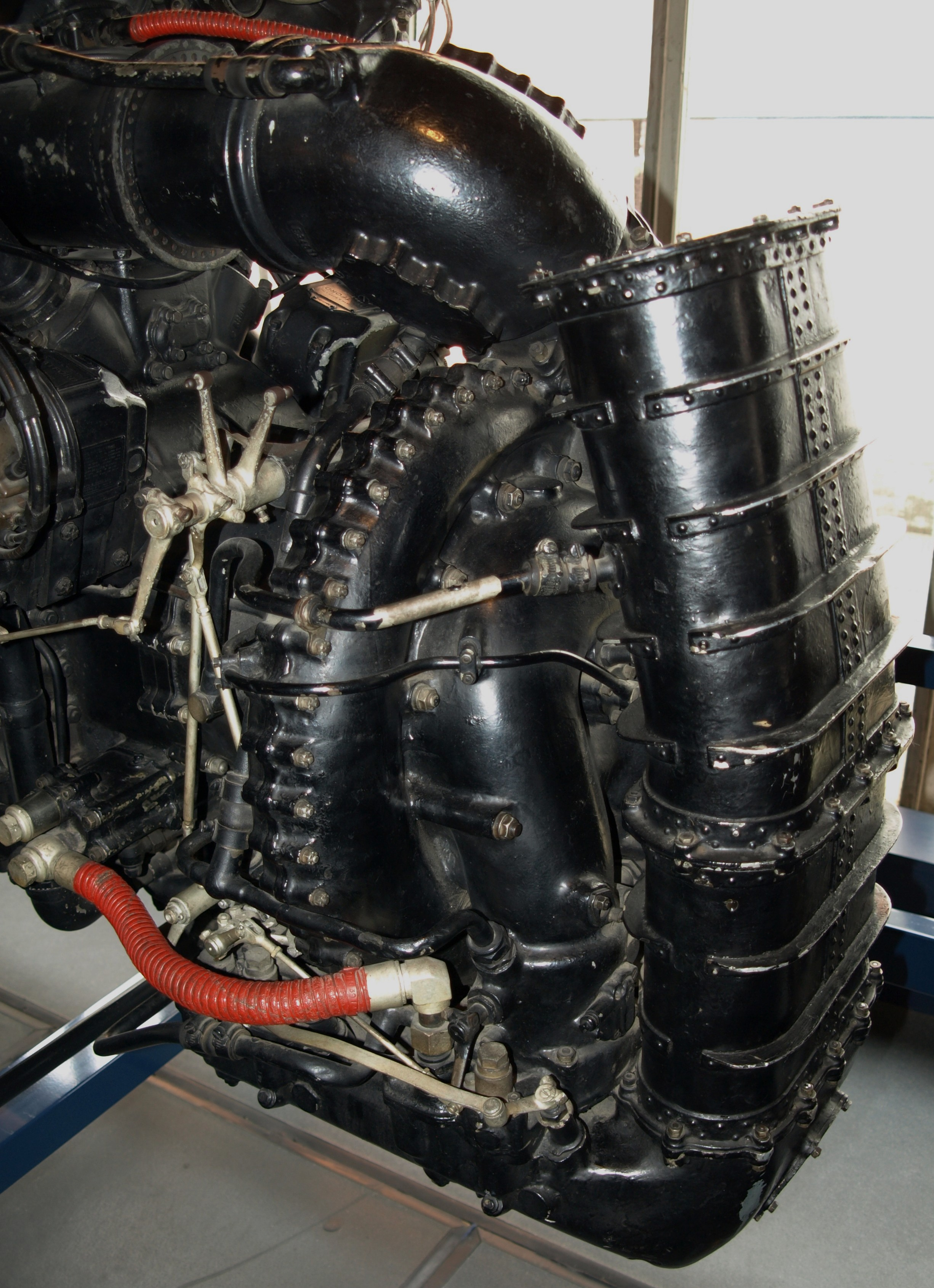
Supercharger detail of the Rolls-Royce R

The keys to the R engine's high power-to-weight ratio were its supercharger design, ability to run at high revolutions due to its structural strength, and the special blends of fuel used. The double-sided supercharger impeller was a new development for Rolls-Royce: running at a ratio of almost 8:1, it could supply intake air at up to 18 pounds per square inch (psi) (1.24 bar) above atmospheric pressure, a figure known as "boost" and commonly abbreviated as "+x lb". By comparison the maximum boost of the earlier Rolls-Royce Kestrel design was +6 lb (0.4 bar), this figure not being achieved until 1934. The high boost pressures initially caused the spark plugs to fail on test, and eventually the Lodge type X170 plug was chosen as it proved to be extremely reliable.

The development of special fuel was attributed to the work of "Rod" Banks, an engineer who specialised in fuels and engine development. After using neat benzole for early ground test runs, a mixture of 11% aviation petrol and 89% benzole plus 5 cubic centimetres (cc) of tetra-ethyl lead per Imperial gallon (4.5 L) was tried. This blend of fuel was used to win the 1929 Schneider Trophy race, and continued to be used until June 1931. It was discovered that adding 10% methanol to this mixture resulted in a 20 hp (15 kW) increase, with the further advantage of reduced fuel weight – particularly important for aircraft use – due to its lowered specific gravity. For the 1931 airspeed record attempt acetone was added to prevent intermittent misfiring; the composition of this final blend was 30% benzole, 60% methanol, and 10% acetone, plus 4.2 cc of tetra-ethyl lead per gallon.

On an early test run the R engine produced 1,400 hp (1,000 kW) and was noted to idle happily at 450 revolutions per minute (rpm). With increased boost ratings and fuel developed by Banks, the R engine ultimately developed 2,530 hp (1,890 kW) at 3,200 rpm; well over double the maximum power output of the Buzzard. (Note: Maximum power output of the Rolls-Royce Buzzard was 920 hp (690 kW) at 2,300 rpm.) The engine was further tested and cleared for limited sprint racing at 2,783 hp (2,075 kW) at 3,400 rpm and +21 lb (1.45 bar) of boost, but this capability was not used due to concerns with the S.6B's airframe not being able to withstand the power, and the inability of the aircraft to lift the extra fuel required to meet the increased consumption.

=== Testing ===
==== Ground testing ====
The first run of engine R1 took place at Rolls-Royce's Derby factory on 7 April 1929 with R7 running the next day. Many mechanical failures were experienced during bench testing including burnt valves, connecting rod breakages and main bearing seizures, while considerably more trouble than expected occurred with valve springs; at one time two or three would be found broken after a 10-minute run, but the continual redesigning and testing of components reduced all these problems. Unknown to Royce himself, the engineers had also fitted "Wellworthy" (Note: Wellworthy was the trade name of a British piston and piston ring manufacturer.) pistons that were better able to withstand the 13 tons "pressure" (Note: The source is unclear as to the exact meaning of this statement – it may refer to the total force exerted on the piston, or the force per unit area.) of each firing stroke.

Ground testing of the R involved the use of three Kestrel engines: one to simulate a headwind or airspeed, one to provide ventilation of the test area, and another to cool the crankcase. Superchargers could be tested on a separate rig that was driven by another Kestrel engine. Eight men were required to run a test cell, led by the "Chief Tester" who had the tasks of logging the figures and directing the other operators. One of these chief testers was Victor Halliwell who later lost his life whilst on board the water speed record contender Miss England II. The conditions in the test cell were particularly unpleasant; deafness and tinnitus lasting up to two days were experienced by test personnel even after plugging their ears with cotton wool. Development time was short and the deafening sound of three Kestrels and an R engine running at high power for 24 hours a day took its toll on the local population. The Mayor of Derby stepped in and asked that the people endure the noise for the sake of British prestige; subsequently testing continued for seven months.

In the course of a 25-minute test an early R engine would consume 60 Imperial gallons (gal) (270 L) of pre-heated castor oil. The majority of this was spat out of the exhaust ports and smothered the test cell walls, milk being given to staff to minimise the effects of this well-known laxative. Up to 200 gal (900 L) of the special fuel blend had to be mixed for each test, 80 gal (360 L) of which were used just to warm the engine to operating temperature. The same coarse-pitch propeller used for flight trials was fitted throughout these tests.

==== Flight testing ====
Overseen by Cyril Lovesey, flight testing commenced on 4 August 1929 in the new Supermarine S.6 at RAF Calshot, a seaplane and flying boat station on Southampton Water in Hampshire. During pre-race scrutineering tests, metal particles were found on two of the engine's 24 spark plugs indicating a piston failure which would require an engine re-build or replacement. The competition rules did not allow an engine change, but due to the foresight of Ernest Hives, several Rolls-Royce engineers and mechanics that were familiar with the R had travelled down to Southampton to witness the trials, and with their assistance one cylinder bank was removed, the damaged piston replaced and the cylinder refurbished. This work was completed overnight and allowed the team to continue in the competition.

Engine starting was achieved by a combination of compressed air and a hand-turned magneto; however, starting problems were encountered during pre-race testing at Calshot due to moisture in the air and water contamination of the fuel. A complicated test procedure was devised to ensure clean fuel for competition flights since more than 0.3% water content made it unusable. As expected, minor engine failures continued to be experienced, and to counter this engines and parts were transported at high speed between Derby and Calshot using an adapted Rolls-Royce Phantom I motor car. Travelling mostly after dark, this vehicle became known as the Phantom of The Night.

=== Relationship to the Griffon and Merlin ===
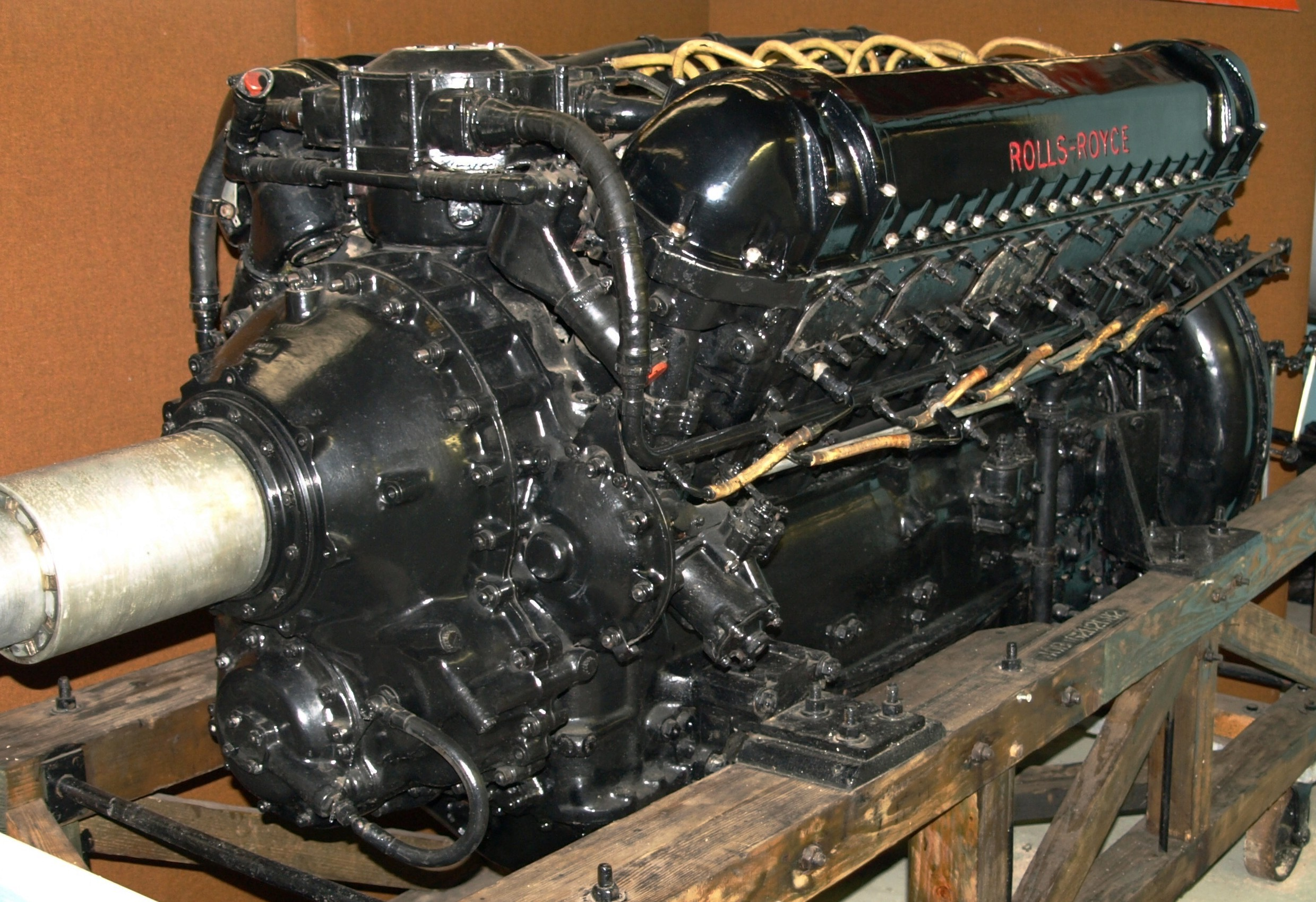
A late-production Rolls-Royce Griffon

According to Arthur Rubbra's memoirs, a de-rated version of the R engine, known by the name Griffon at that time, was tested in 1933. This engine, R11, was used for "Moderately Supercharged Buzzard development" (which was not proceeded with until much later), and bore no direct relationship to the volume-produced Griffon of the 1940s.

The pre-production Griffon I shared the R engine's bore and stroke, but was otherwise a completely new design that first ran in the Experimental Department in November 1939. Although this single engine was never flown, the production version, the Griffon II, first flew in 1941 installed in the Fairey Firefly. A significant difference between the R and the production Griffon was the re-location of the camshaft and supercharger drives to the front of the engine to reduce overall length. Another length-reducing measure was the use of a single magneto (the R had two, mounted at the rear), this again was moved to the front of the engine.

Further possible development work on the R engine was discussed in The National Archives' file AVIA 13/122, which contains a proposal from the Royal Aircraft Establishment dated October and November 1932, to test four engines to destruction. This document states that there were five engines available for test purposes, the fifth to be used for a standard Type Test at high revolutions.

Although not directly related to the Spitfire, the Supermarine engineers gained valuable experience of high-speed flight with the S.5 and S.6 aircraft, their next project being the Rolls-Royce Goshawk-powered Supermarine Type 224 prototype fighter aircraft. Technological advances used in the R engine, such as sodium-cooled valves and spark plugs able to operate under high boost pressures, were incorporated into the Rolls-Royce Merlin design. The author Steve Holter sums up the design of the Rolls-Royce R with these words:

Quite simply the R-type engine was far ahead of its time, a marvel of British skill and ability.

— Steve Holter, Leap Into Legend

== Schneider Trophy use ==
The Schneider Trophy was a prestigious annual prize competition for seaplanes that was first held in 1913. The 1926 race was the first where all the teams fielded pilots from their armed forces, the Air Ministry financing a British team known as the High Speed Flight drawn from the Royal Air Force. Sometimes known simply as The Flight, the team was formed at the Marine Aircraft Experimental Establishment, Felixstowe, in preparation for the 1927 race in which Supermarine's Mitchell-designed, Napier Lion-powered Supermarine S.5s placed first and second. 1927 was the last annual competition, the event then moving onto a biannual schedule to allow more development time between races.

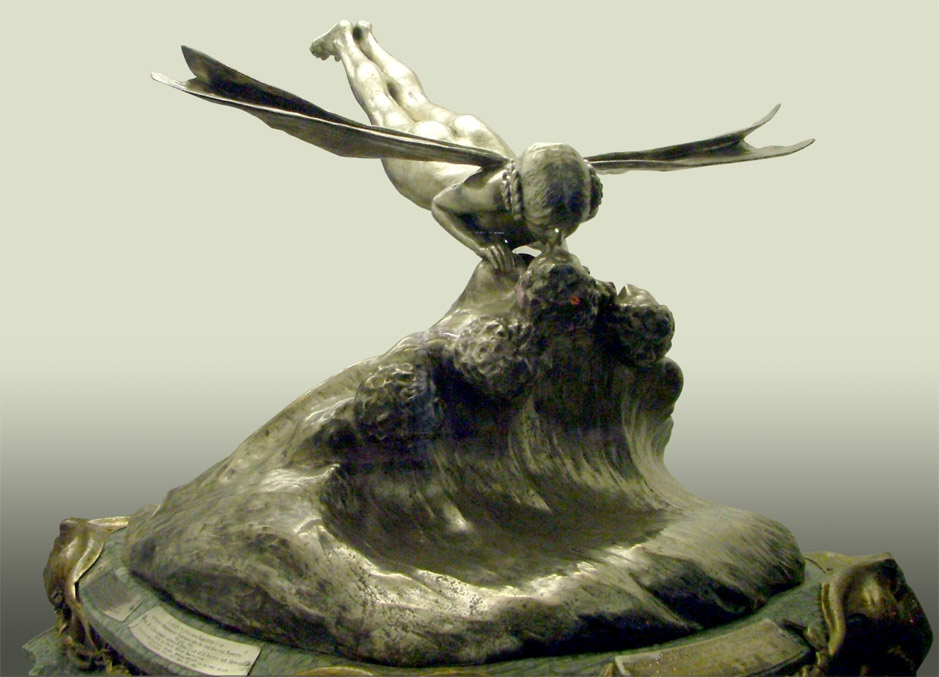
The Schneider Trophy on display at the London Science Museum

During the 1929 race at Cowes between Great Britain and Italy, Richard Waghorn flying the Supermarine S.6 with the new Rolls-Royce R engine retained the Schneider Trophy for Great Britain with an average speed of 328.63 mph (529 km/h), and also gained the 50 and 100 km (31 and 62 mi) world speed records. The records were subsequently beaten when Richard Atcherley later registered higher speeds when he completed his laps of the circuit. (Note: The American and French entrants for 1929 withdrew before the start of the contest through a combination of technical problems and lack of training.) The Italian team placed second and fourth using Fiat AS.3 V12-powered Macchi M.52 aircraft. Another racing seaplane, the Fiat C.29 powered by the AS.5 engine attended the contest but did not compete.

More comparable to the R engine was the Fiat AS.6 engine developed for the 1931 contest; effectively a coupled, double AS.5 that suffered from technical problems. With the assistance of Rod Banks, the AS.6 powered the Macchi M.C.72 to a new speed record for piston-powered seaplanes in 1934 of 440.6 mph (709.1 km/h), a record that still stands as of 2009.

In 1931 the British Government withdrew financial support, but a private donation of £100,000 from Lucy, Lady Houston allowed Supermarine to compete on 13 September using the R-powered Supermarine S.6B. For this race the engine's rating was increased by 400 to 2,300 hp (300 to 1,720 kW). The Italian and French entrants however, failed to ready their aircraft and crews in time for the competition, and the remaining British team set both a new world speed record at 379 mph (610 km/h) and, unopposed, won the trophy outright with a third consecutive victory. "The Flight" was wound up within weeks of the 1931 win as there were to be no more Schneider Trophy contests. The original Trophy is on display in the London Science Museum along with the S.6B that secured it, as well as the R engine that powered this aircraft for the subsequent airspeed record flight.

== World speed record use ==
New airspeed records were set after the 1929 and 1931 Schneider Trophy contests, both achieved using the R engine. In the two decades before World War II, the quest to break the land speed record was hotly contested, particularly so in the early 1930s. Aero engines were often used to power wheeled vehicles to ever-higher speeds, chosen because of their high power-to-weight ratios: the Liberty engine, Napier Lion and the Sunbeam Matabele were among the engine types used in the 1920s. The Rolls-Royce R was the latest development in high-powered aero engine design at the time, and was chosen by several makers of land speed record-contending cars; the engine was also chosen for powerboats attempting the water speed record. One car and two boats successfully used the combined power of two R engines.

=== Airspeed record ===
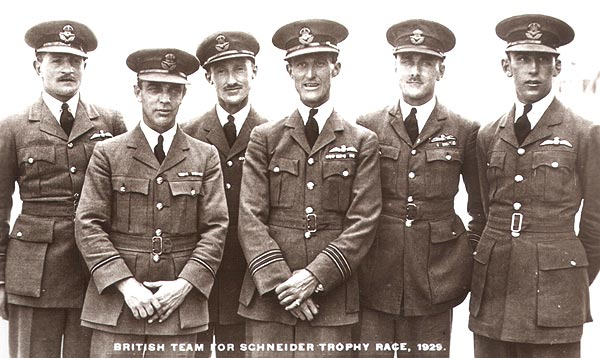
The 1929 British Schneider Trophy team. left to right Waghorn, Moon, Grieg, Orlebar, Stainforth and Atcherley.

Supermarine S.6

Immediately after the 1929 Schneider Trophy contest Squadron Leader Augustus Orlebar, commanding officer of the High Speed Flight, set a new airspeed record of 355.8 mph (572.6 km/h) using Supermarine S.6, N247.

Supermarine S.6B

On 29 September 1931, barely two weeks after the British team had secured the Schneider Trophy outright, Flight Lieutenant George Stainforth broke the world airspeed record in a Rolls-Royce R-powered Supermarine S.6B, serial S1595, reaching an average speed of 407.5 mph (655.8 km/h). It had been intended to also use the identical sister aircraft, S1596, for the attempt but Stainforth had capsized it on 16 September whilst testing a propeller.

=== Land speed record ===
Campbell-Railton Blue Bird

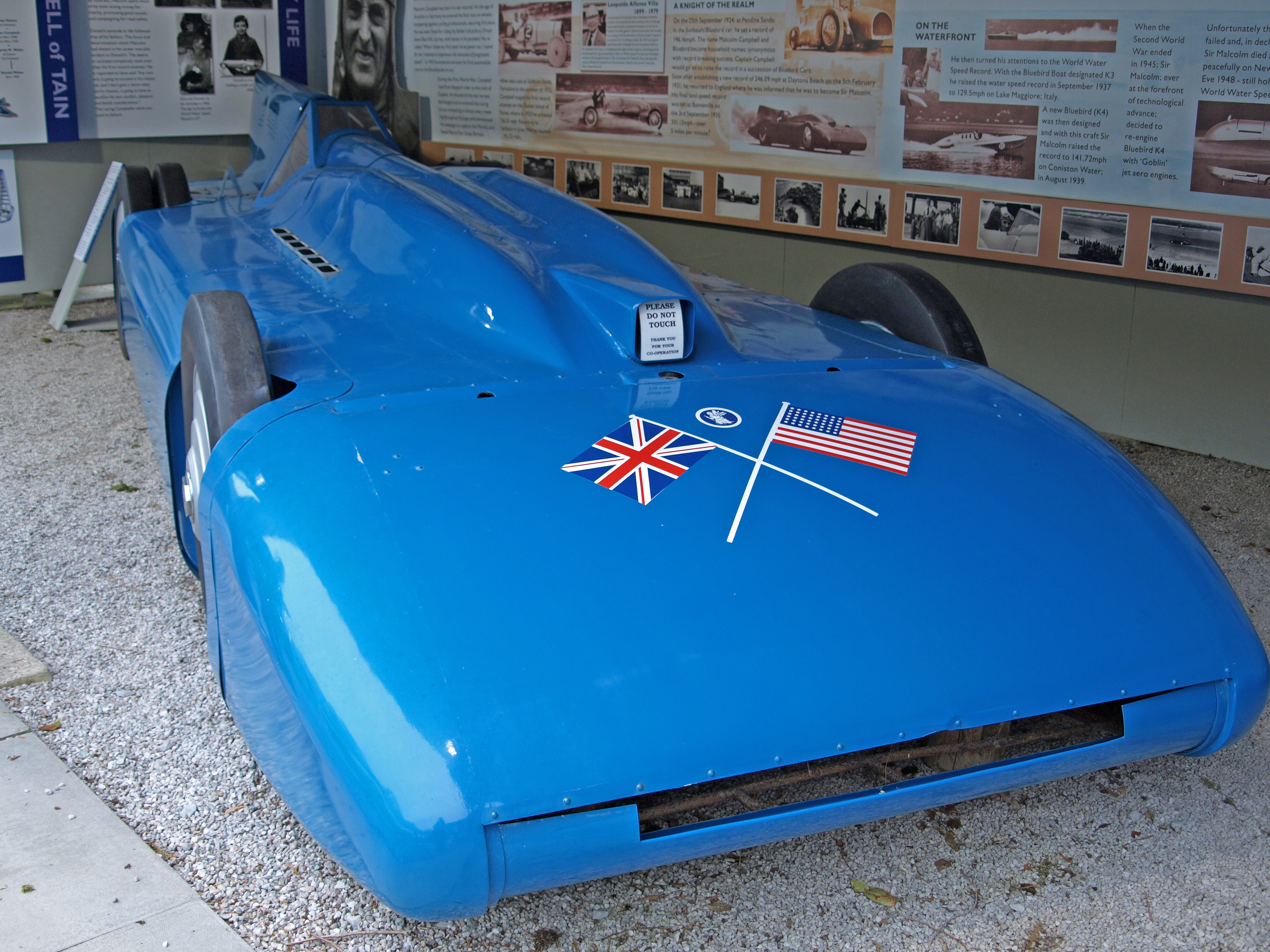
Campbell-Railton Blue Bird replica, an exhibit at the Lakeland Motor Museum

Sir Malcolm Campbell, and later his son Donald, used R engines from 1931 to 1951. At Sir Malcolm's knighthood ceremony in February 1931, King George V expressed great interest in the R and asked many questions about its fuel consumption and performance.

In 1932, Campbell stated that he "... was fortunate in procuring a special R.R. Schneider Trophy engine" for his land speed record car to replace its Napier Lion. Lent to him by Rolls-Royce, this engine was either R25 or R31. By February 1933 the car, named Blue Bird had been rebuilt to accommodate the larger engine and was running at Daytona.

In late 1933 Campbell bought engine R37 from Rolls-Royce; and had also been lent R17 and R19 by Lord Wakefield, and R39 by Rolls-Royce. He then lent R17 to George Eyston. Once he had achieved the 300 mph (480 km/h) record on 3 September 1935 at the Bonneville Speedway, Campbell retired from further land speed endeavours.

Lord Wakefield arranged for a replica of the Rolls-Royce R to be exhibited at the 1933 Motor Show, held at Olympia, London. A press report from the event provides an insight into the public perception of the engine:

Of the size only of an office desk ... this 12-cylinder supercharged racing engine is more powerful than an express locomotive. Its design is stated to be so valuable that it is still on the Government's secret list.

— Press report, The Fast Set

Blue Bird is now on display at the Daytona International Speedway.

Thunderbolt

During the mid-1930s, George Eyston set many speed records with his Speed of the Wind car, powered by an unsupercharged Rolls-Royce Kestrel. In 1937 he built a massive new car, Thunderbolt, powered by two R engines to attempt the absolute land speed record. At first Eyston experienced clutch failure due to the combined power of the engines. Nevertheless, he took the record in November 1937, reaching 312 mph (502 km/h), and in 1938 when Thunderbolt reached 357.5 mph (575.3 km/h). When first built at Bean Industries in Tipton, the nearside engine fitted to Thunderbolt was R27 which had powered S1595 when it set the air speed record in 1931. The other was R25, used by the same aircraft to win the Schneider Trophy two weeks earlier. Eyston had also borrowed R17 from Sir Malcolm Campbell and, with the continuing support that Rolls-Royce extended to both Campbell and Eyston, he also had the option of using R39.

=== Water speed record ===
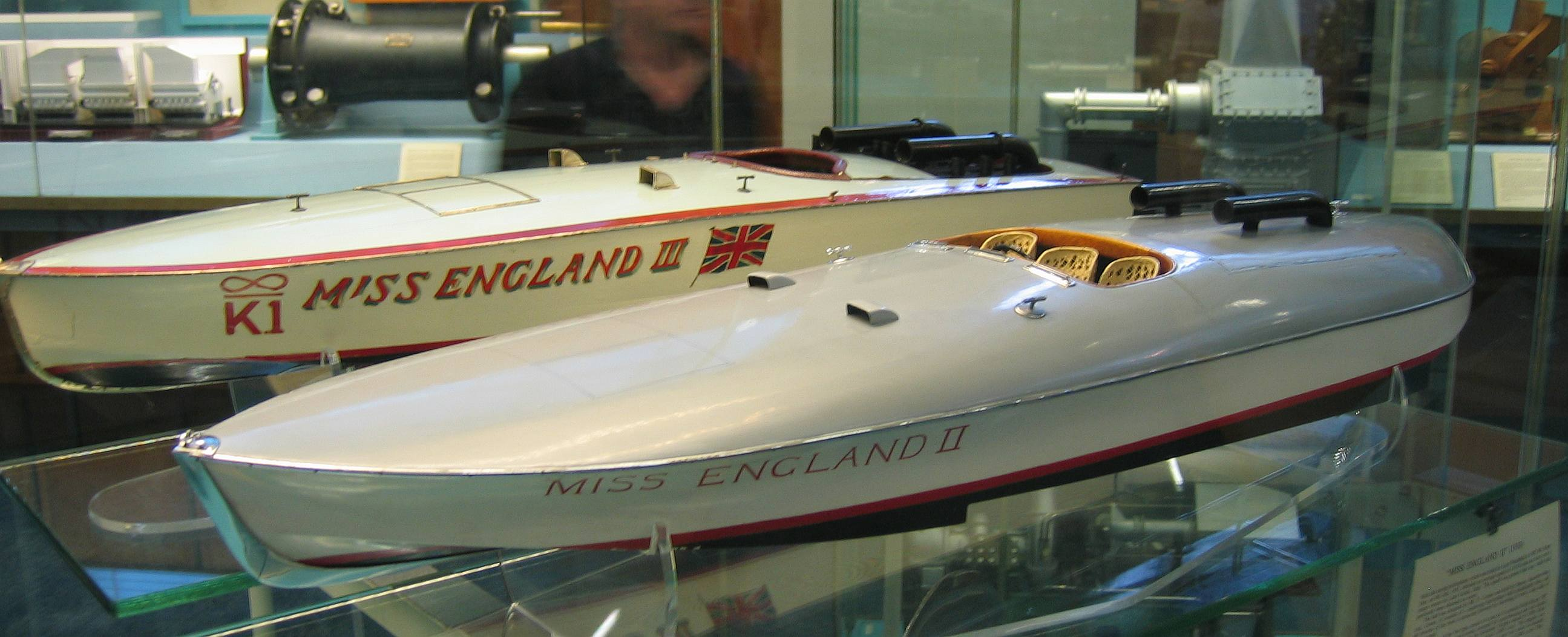
Scale models of Miss England II and III

Miss England II and III

Two R engines, R17 and R19, were built for Sir Henry Segrave's twin-engined water speed record boat Miss England II, this craft being ready for trials on Windermere by June 1930. On Friday 13 June, Segrave was fatally injured and a Rolls-Royce technical advisor, Victor Halliwell, was killed when Miss England II capsized at high speed after possibly hitting a log. Shortly before his death Segrave learnt that he had set a new water speed record of just under 100 mph (160 km/h). On 18 July 1932, Kaye Don set a new world water speed record of 119.81 mph (192.82 km/h) on Loch Lomond in a new boat, Miss England III, which also used engines R17 and R19.

Blue Bird K3

In late 1935, Sir Malcolm Campbell decided to challenge the water speed record. At that point he had two Napier Lions and one Rolls-Royce R engine, R37 at his disposal, and it was decided to install the R engine in Blue Bird K3. During trials on Loch Lomond in June 1937 the engine was "slightly damaged ... because of trouble with the circulating water system". In August 1937 Blue Bird K3 was taken to Lake Maggiore in Italy where "the modified [circulation] system worked perfectly with a second engine", R39.

Blue Bird K4 and the work of Leo Villa

R39 was again used in 1939 in Blue Bird K4. In 1947 Campbell unsuccessfully converted K4 to jet power using a de Havilland Goblin engine. After Campbell's death from natural causes in 1948, Donald Campbell bought K4 for a nominal sum as well as the 1935 record car when his father's effects were auctioned. He also purchased R37 back from a car dealer and reinstalled it in K4. Attempts on the record were made in 1949, and again in 1951 when R37 was "damaged beyond any immediate repair" by overheating. Another attempt was made later in the year using R39, but K4 suffered a structural failure and sank in Coniston Water. It was recovered and broken up on the shore.

The care and maintenance of the Campbell's R engines was entrusted to Leo Villa, a Cockney born to a Swiss father, who was described as "the man behind the Campbells" and a central figure who "fitted the first nut to the first bolt". Villa learnt his trade of "aircraft mechanic" in the Royal Flying Corps; his first job was fitting Beardmore 160 hp engines to airframes. After World War I he worked for a motor racing company and participated as co-driver and mechanic in several races.

Villa was first employed by Malcolm Campbell in 1922, and continued in the service of Donald Campbell until 1967, when Campbell was killed during a record attempt on Coniston Water. He was the chief caretaker of their R engines until the last R-powered record attempt in 1951, after which his responsibilities centred on Campbell's jet engines. Villa's many responsibilities included installing and removing the engines, repairing and tuning them, and operating the compressed air and magneto for starting them. During the World War II years, he was responsible for the upkeep of Blue Bird K4 and the spare R engines, but unknown to him they had been sold along with K3. Villa eventually took the three R engines to Thomson & Taylor at Brooklands for long-term storage.

His relationship with Malcolm Campbell was strained at times: Campbell, with no engineering background, would often question Villa's intimate knowledge of the R engine, but his relations with Donald Campbell were much better, as they were of a similar age. At Lake Garda in 1951 Villa noted the willingness of "Don" to help with engineering tasks, and the difficulties of working on the R engine:

I was in the workshop stitching the old R37 back together and had the long job of lapping in all 48 valves. It was a terrible job because the engine was two monoblocs, which meant that you couldn't just lift off the heads, you had to lift what amounted to two separate engines and even then getting the valves in was no easy task. But old Don just rolled up his sleeves and mucked in.

— Leo Villa, Leap Into Legend

=== World speed record summary ===
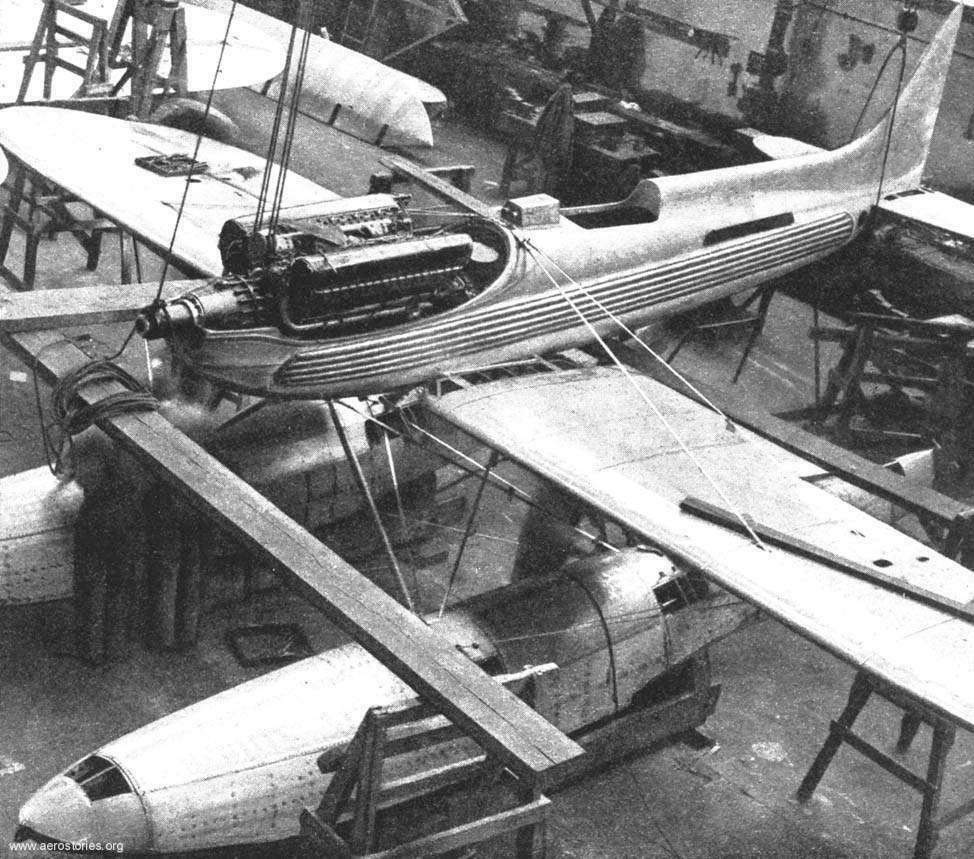
The Rolls-Royce R installed in a Supermarine S.6B; engine oil cooling channels are evident on the fuselage

Note: (Note: Highest record for each aircraft/car/boat type listed only.)

Air speed record
Supermarine S.6: 8 September 1929 – 355.8 mph (572.6 km/h)
Supermarine S.6B: 29 September 1931 – 407.5 mph (655.8 km/h)

Land speed record
Blue Bird: 3 September 1935 – 301 mph (484 km/h)
Thunderbolt: 16 September 1938 – 357.5 mph (575.3 km/h)

Water speed record
Miss England II: 9 July 1931 – 110.28 mph (177.48 km/h)
Miss England III: 18 July 1932 – 119.81 mph (192.82 km/h)
Blue Bird K3: 17 August 1938 – 130.91 mph (210.68 km/h)
Blue Bird K4: 19 August 1939 – 141.74 mph (228.11 km/h)

== Production and individual engine history ==
=== Production summary ===
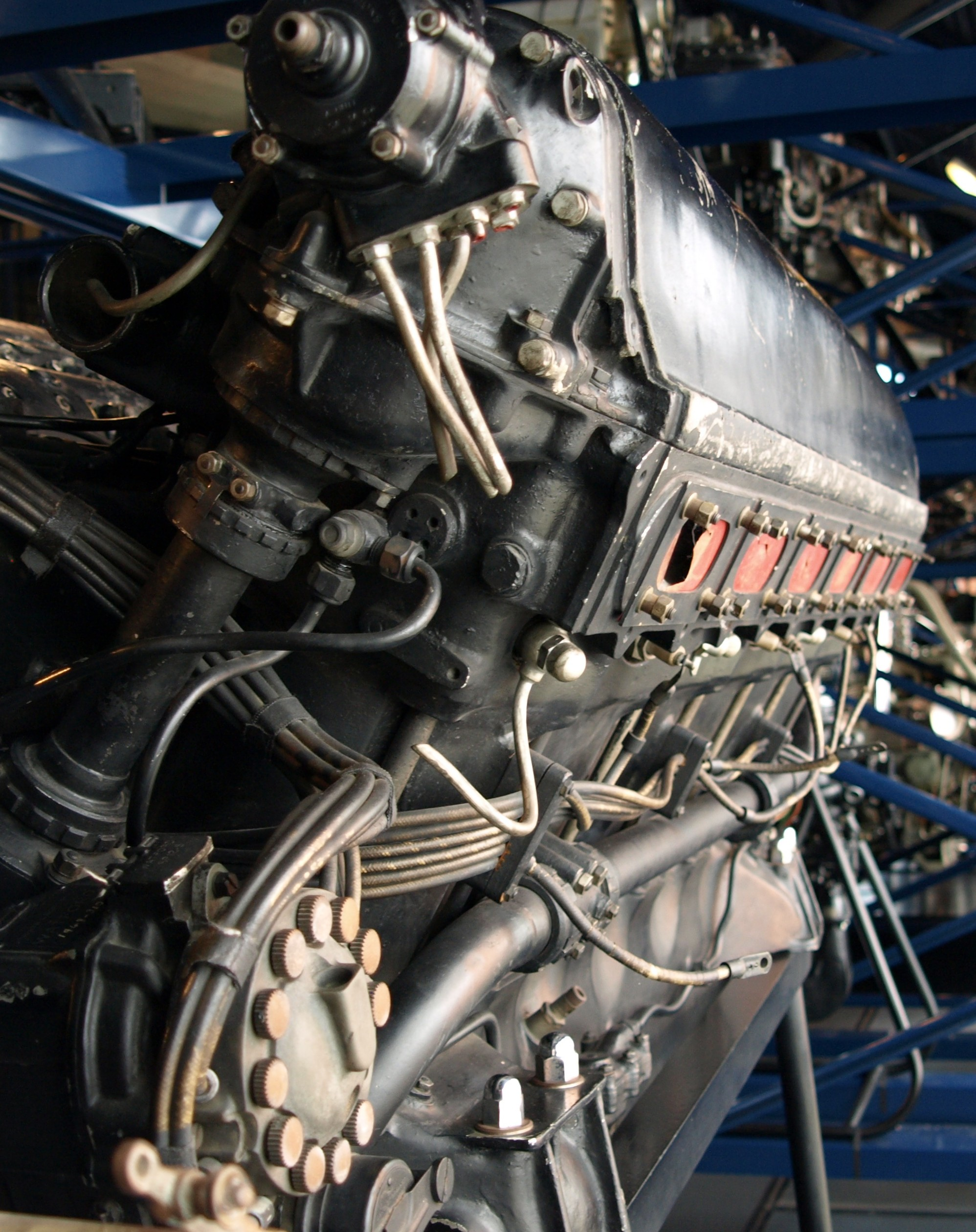
Rear view of R27 showing details of one magneto, camshaft drive and exhaust ports

Nineteen R engines were produced at Derby between 1929 and 1931, all given odd serial numbers. This was a Rolls-Royce convention when the propeller rotated anticlockwise when viewed from the front, but an exception was made for R17, the sole clockwise-rotation R engine. There is some confusion as to whether 19 or 20 R engines were produced. In his notes Leo Villa refers to an R18 engine, but according to Holter this may have been R17 converted to clockwise rotation at the request of Malcolm Campbell rather than an additional example. There was no R13 as Rolls-Royce never used the number 13 in any of their designations. A summary production list is given below:

1929 Development engines
R1, R3 and R5
1929 Schneider Trophy engines
R7, R9 and R15
1930 Development engine
R11
1930 Wakefield order for Miss England II
R17 and R19
1931 Schneider Trophy engines
R21, R23, R25, R27, R29 and R31
1931 Development/factory spare engines
R33, R35, R37 and R39

=== Individual history table ===
| Engine | Date | Notes | Display location |
|---|---|---|---|
| R1 | 7 April 1929 | Development engine. First test using neat benzole fuel. No power figures taken. | |
| R1 | 1 May 1929 | 1,400 hp (1,000 kW) observed after 13 hours running. | |
| R1 | 7 May 1929 | 1,500 hp (1,100 kW) at 2,750 rpm, briefly run at 1,686 hp (1,257 kW) at 3,000 rpm. Engine stripped, forked connecting rods found cracked. Redesigned rods fitted and crankcase machined. The crankcase modifications decreased over-oiling by 75%, a new scraper ring was suggested to cure the remainder. Fuel/air distribution problem due to new manifold design – return to the original Buzzard manifold suggested. | |
| R3 | 15 May 1929 | Development engine. Completed 15-minute acceptance test. 1,500 hp (1,100 kW) at 2,750 rpm. | |
| R3 | 26 February 1931 | Back in development test house. Spot reading of 2,300 hp (1,700 kW) at 3,200 rpm noted. | |
| R3 | 21 April 1931 | First test with articulated connecting rods. | |
| R3 | 23 April 1931 | 1,900 hp (1,400 kW) at 3,200 rpm for 17 minutes – longest time at this power with new rods. | |
| R3 | 24 April 1931 | Failed after 17 minutes when the main bearings collapsed | |
| R3 | 25 April 1931 | 2,210 hp (1,650 kW) at 3,200 rpm. Attempted 1-hour Air Ministry acceptance test but oil pressure was lost after 22 minutes. | |
| R3 | 1 May 1931 | Failed after 2.5 minutes when the main bearing and connecting rods failed | |
| R3 | 14 May 1931 | Failed after 17.33 minutes when supercharger slipper bushes seized | |
| R3 | 15 May 1931 | Two runs of 29.5 minutes and 18.5 minutes, both terminated by broken exhaust valves | |
| R3 | 29 May 1931 | Ran for 25 minutes fitted with sodium-filled valves. Heads failed | |
| R3 | 14 July 1931 | Running with sodium-filled valves. | |
| R3 | 28 July 1931 | Further attempt at the 1-hour test, crankshaft failure after 34 minutes. Rebuilt but experienced a second crankshaft failure after 58 minutes, power output of 2,360 hp (1,760 kW) at 3,200 rpm noted just prior to failure. | |
| R5 | 18 June 1929 | Development engine. Completed 15-minute acceptance test. 1,500 hp (1,100 kW) at 2,750 rpm. | |
| R5 | 7 August 1929 | Completed first 1-hour full-throttle test. 1,568 hp (1,169 kW) at 3,000 rpm. | |
| R5 | 25 February 1931 | Back in development for 1931 race. Probably this engine that blew up at 2,000 hp (1,500 kW) after dynamometer coupling failure. | |
| R7 | 6 July 1929 | Passed 15-minute acceptance test. 1,552 hp (1,157 kW). Issued to Calshot for test flying with minimum use of full throttle. | |
| R7 | Mid-September 1929 | Post race, installed in S.6, N248, for speed record attempt. | |
| R9 | 4 August 1929 | Installed in S.6, N247, for sea trials and attempted first flight – aircraft refused to takeoff due to handling problems. All modifications to date were incorporated in this engine. | |
| R9 | 10 August 1929 | First flight, in S.6, N247. | |
| R9 | 22 August 1929 | Returned to Derby having run 4 hr 33 min on the ground and 2 hr 52 min in the air. Overhauled and refitted to N247 for the race. | |
| R9 | June 1931 | Rebuilt to 1931 specification. 2,165 hp (1,614 kW) at 3,200 rpm. Cleared at Calshot for limited full-throttle use. | |
| R9 | 12 August 1931 | Back at Derby with new design crankshaft. 2,350 hp (1,750 kW) at 3,200 rpm for full hour. | |
| R11 | 25 August 1929 | Flown in S.6 N248. Development engine in 1930. | |
| R11 | 1930 | Redesignated "R-MS-11" for Buzzard MS (moderately supercharged) development. | |
| R15 | 7 September 1929 | Probably in S.6, N248, for the race. | |
| R15 | 26 June 1931 | Flown in S.6A N248,. | |
| R15 | 22 August 1931 | Flown in S.6B S1595,. | |
| R17 | April 1930 | Direct-drive engine for Sir Henry Segrave's water speed record boat Miss England II, sponsored by Lord Wakefield. 2,053 hp (1,531 kW) at 3,000 rpm. Water-cooled exhaust manifolds. This was the only R engine originally made as an anticlockwise unit – hence it had a different crankshaft, camshaft and ancillaries. Contrary to Rolls-Royce convention it was given an odd engine number. | |
| R17 | 1935 | Lent by Lord Wakefield to Sir Malcolm Campbell as a spare for land speed record attempt. | |
| R17 | | Lent by Sir Malcolm Campbell to George Eyston as a spare for land speed record attempt. | |
| R19 | April 1930 | Direct-drive engine for Sir Henry Segrave's water speed record boat Miss England II, sponsored by Lord Wakefield. 2,053 hp (1,531 kW) at 3,000 rpm. | |
| R19 | 1935 | Lent by Lord Wakefield to Sir Malcolm Campbell as a spare for a land speed record attempt. | |
| R19 | 30 June 1937 | Timed at 85 mph (137 km/h) in Blue Bird K3 with Sir Malcolm Campbell. | |
| R21 | 6 July 1931 | First new 1931 engine, passed final inspection. 2,292 hp (1,709 kW). Installed in S.6B, S1595, for first flight 29 July. | |
| R23 | 30 July 1931 | Delivered to Supermarine. Fitted in S.6B S1596, for first flight 12 August. | |
| R25 | 9 September 1931 | Fitted in S6B S1596,. | Royal Air Force Museum London. |
| R25 | 13 September 1931 | Fitted to the S.6B, S1596 for first Air Speed Record runs flown by Flt Lt George Stainforth. | Royal Air Force Museum London. |
| R25 | | To George Eyston for Thunderbolt land speed record car. Later to RAF Cranwell. | Royal Air Force Museum London. |
| R27 | 8 September 1931 | Flown in S.6B S1596, | London Science Museum. |
| R27 | 29 September 1931 | Fitted in S.6B S1595 (the Trophy-winning aircraft), and gained the air speed record at 407.5 mph (655.8 km/h). | London Science Museum. |
| R27 | | To George Eyston for the Thunderbolt land speed record car. | London Science Museum. |
| R29 | 3 September 1931 | Third 1931 race engine delivered. | |
| R29 | 13 September 1931 | Installed in S.6B, S1595, for the Schneider Trophy Contest. Aircraft flown by Flt Lt John Boothman won the Trophy | |
| R31 | 13 September 1931 | Last of batch of 6 made for 1931 contest. Installed in S.6A N248 as reserve aircraft for the Schneider Trophy Contest | |
| R33 | 1933 | Development engine for the last two land speed record (LSR) engines. Installed in Campbell-Railton Blue Bird during construction at Brooklands. | |
| R35 | | Development engine for the last two LSR engines. Thought to have been used as a mock-up model for display only. | |
| R37 | Late-1933 | Bought from Rolls-Royce for £5,800 by Sir Malcolm Campbell for use in the Campbell-Railton Blue Bird car. | Filching Manor Motor Museum |
| R37 | July/August 1937 | Fitted into Blue Bird K3 by Saunders-Roe on initial build, later overheated and damaged due to cooling scoop problems. | Filching Manor Motor Museum |
| R37 | 17 August 1949 | In Blue Bird K4 with Donald Campbell. This replaced the Goblin jet engine installed unsuccessfully by Sir Malcolm Campbell. | Filching Manor Motor Museum |
| R39 | 1935 | "Factory spare" lent by Rolls-Royce to Sir Malcolm Campbell as a back-up (he already owned R37) for the 1935 land speed record attempt. | |
| R39 | | Option given to George Eyston to use this engine as a spare for the Thunderbolt car. | |
| R39 | July/August 1937 | Replaced R37 in Blue Bird K3 by Sir Malcolm Campbell. | |
| R39 | 1 September 1937 | Takes water speed record in K3 at 126.32 mph (203.29 km/h). | |
| R39 | 17 August 1938 | In Blue Bird K4 raises water speed record again to 130.91 mph (210.68 km/h) with Sir Malcolm Campbell. | |
| R39 | 19 August 1939 | In Blue Bird K4, new record of 141.74 mph (228.11 km/h) by Sir Malcolm Campbell on Coniston Water. | |
| R39 | 10 June 1951 | In Blue Bird K4 with Donald Campbell, after R37 was damaged by overheating. | |
| R39 | 10 September 1951 | Sank at Coniston Water in Blue Bird K4 during water speed record attempt by Donald Campbell, salvaged, hull broken up and burnt on the shore. Suspected structural failure of the boat's engine mounts after driveshaft breakage at 170 mph (270 km/h). | |

== Applications ==
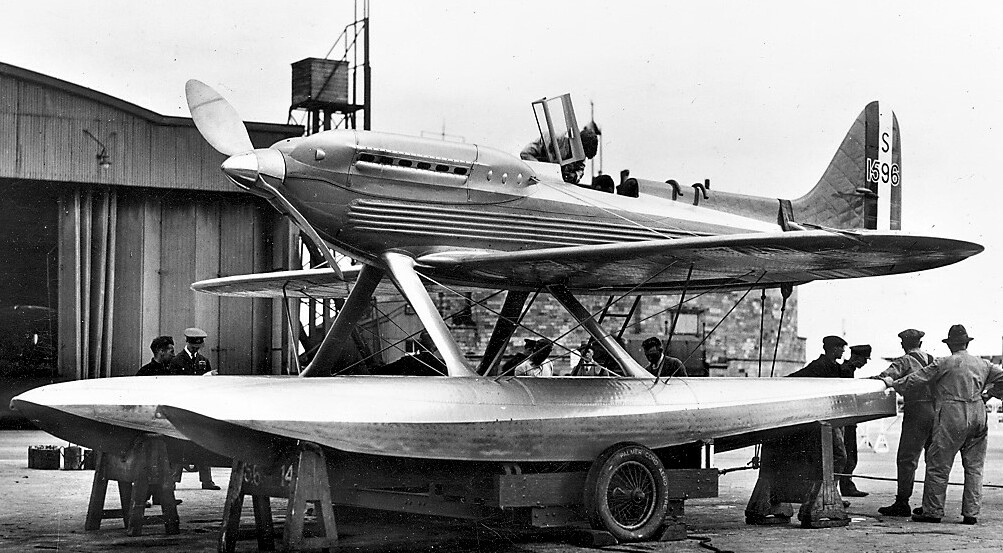
The R-powered Supermarine S.6B, S1596

Aircraft

- Supermarine S.6
- Supermarine S.6A
- Supermarine S.6B

Cars

- Campbell-Railton Blue Bird
- Thunderbolt

Boats

- Blue Bird K3
- Blue Bird K4
- Miss England II
- Miss England III

== Engines on display ==
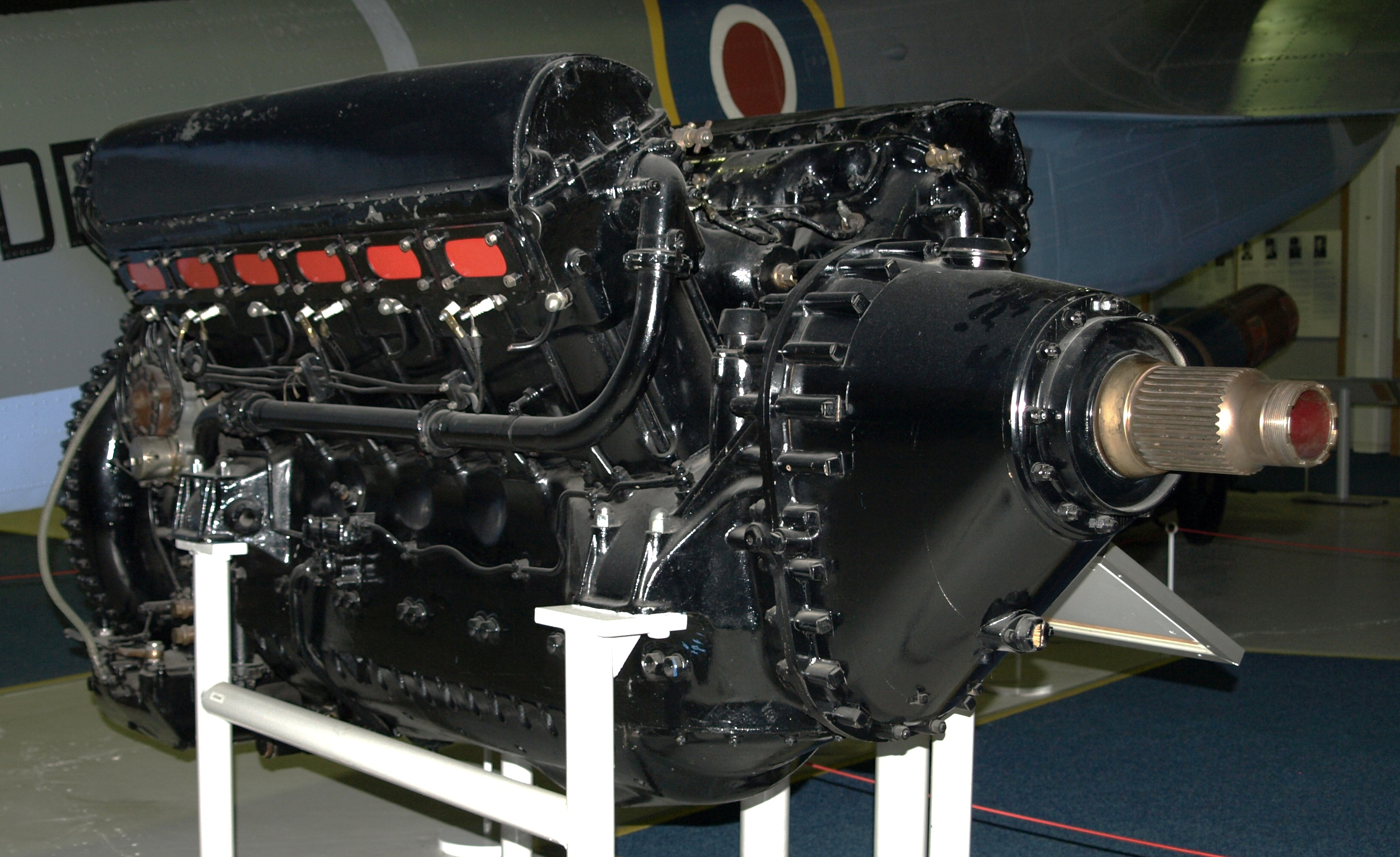
Rolls-Royce R, R25, at the Royal Air Force Museum London

R25

The Royal Air Force Museum London at Hendon has a Rolls-Royce R on display (museum number 65E1139) that came to the museum in November 1965 from RAF Cranwell. According to the museum's records, before that it was with George Eyston as one of Thunderbolt's record engines. Its data plate states that it is R25 under Air Ministry contract number A106961 which makes it the second 1931 race engine delivered to RAF Calshot.

R27

The London Science Museum has an R engine on display which is catalogued as a stand-alone item, inventory number 1948-310. This is R27, the second sprint engine prepared for the successful air speed record attempt, and later used in Thunderbolt. The Science Museum also has S.6B, S1595, (winner of the 1931 race and the final air speed record aircraft) on display.

R37

The Filching Manor Motor Museum has R37 which is destined to be fitted in its restoration of the Blue Bird K3 water speed record boat.

These three engines are the only ones listed by the British Aircraft Preservation Council/Rolls-Royce Heritage Trust. The Solent Sky museum's S.6A, N248, (a competing aircraft in the 1929 race as an S.6, and stand-by for the 1931 race, modified as an S.6A) does not contain an R engine.

== Specifications (R – 1931) ==
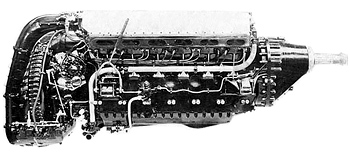
The Rolls-Royce R

Data from Lumsden and Holter.

=== General characteristics ===
- Type: 12-cylinder, supercharged, liquid-cooled, 60° "V", aircraft piston engine
- Bore: 6 in (152.4 mm)
- Stroke: 6.6 in (167.6 mm)
- Displacement: 2,239 cu in (36.7 L)
- Length: 100 in (2,500 mm)
- Width: 32 in (810 mm)
- Height: 42 in (1,100 mm)
- Dry weight: 1,640 pounds (740 kg)

=== Components ===
- Valvetrain: Two intake and two exhaust valves per cylinder with sodium-cooled exhaust valve stems, actuated via a single overhead camshaft on each bank
- Supercharger: Single-speed centrifugal type supercharger, ratio 7.47:1, maximum +18 lb boost at 24,000 impeller rpm
- Fuel system: Four duplex updraught Rolls-Royce/Claudel-Hobson carburettors
- Fuel type: 30% benzole, 60% methanol, 10% acetone, plus 4.2 cc of tetra-ethyl lead per gallon
- Oil system: Dry sump with one pressure pump and two scavenge pumps, pure castor oil
- Cooling system: 70% water and 30% ethylene glycol coolant mixture, pressurised
- Reduction gear: 0.605:1, right-hand tractor

=== Performance ===
- Power output: 2,530 hp (1,890 kW) at 3,200 rpm
- Specific power: 1.13 hp/cu in (51.41 kW/L)
- Compression ratio: 6:1
- Fuel consumption: 3.5 gal/min (16 L/min)
- Specific fuel consumption: 0.85 pt/hp/hr
- Oil consumption: 14 imp gal/hr (64 L/h)
- Power-to-weight ratio: 1.54 hp/lb (2.54 kW/kg)

== See also ==
- Rolls-Royce aircraft piston engines

Related development

- Rolls-Royce Buzzard
- Rolls-Royce Griffon

Comparable engines

- Fiat AS.6
- Mikulin AM-38

Related lists

- List of aircraft engines
