= Peter Du Cane (boat designer) =

British boat designer and Royal Navy commander (1901–1984)

Peter Du Cane CBE (1901–1984) was a Royal Navy commander and managing director of the engineering company Vospers. He assisted in the development of the Blue Bird II amongst other boats.

== Biography ==
Du Cane was born in 1901, the son of Charles Du Cane, of Braxted Park. His paternal grandfather Sir Charles Du Cane was a politician and colonial administrator; his paternal grandmother Georgiana was the daughter of John Copley, 1st Baron Lyndhurst.

He joined the Indian Navy as a thirteen-year-old before resigning his commission as a Lieutenant-Commander in 1928. The following year he joined the Royal Auxiliary Air Force where he flew Westland Wapitis in No. 601 Squadron RAF. Du Cane was invited by Glen Kidston to join him at Vosper Shipyard. Following Kidston's death and numerous ownership changes, Du Cane was offered the managing director's position. He accepted, while maintaining his position as Chief Designer.

Under Du Cane's guidance, Vosper won a number of contracts for high-speed boats, including the construction of Blue Bird K4 which, piloted by Malcolm Campbell, took the world water speed record in 1939. Du Cane was awarded the Segrave Medal by the Royal Automobile Club that year for his efforts. He also designed a high-speed torpedo boat, the MTB 102, 350 of which were procured by the Admiralty, and which were used extensively during the D-Day landings. Du Cane was the naval architect and exterior designer of Brave Challenger, a super-yacht with a top speed of 60 knots (110 km/h; 69 mph), and powerboats Tramontana and Tramontana II, the former winning in the inaugural Cowes–Torquay race in 1961.

Later in his career, Du Cane joined the Fleet Air Arm. In 1964, he was made a Commander of the Order of the British Empire (CBE).

Du Cane died on 31 October 1984, aged 83, and was buried at sea.

== Publications ==
- Du Cane, Peter (1974) [1951]. High-Speed Small Craft (4th (David & Charles) ed.). Temple Press. ISBN 978-0-7153-5926-6.
- —— (1971). An Engineer of Sorts. Nautical Books. ISBN 978-0-245-50749-6.
