= Miss England III =

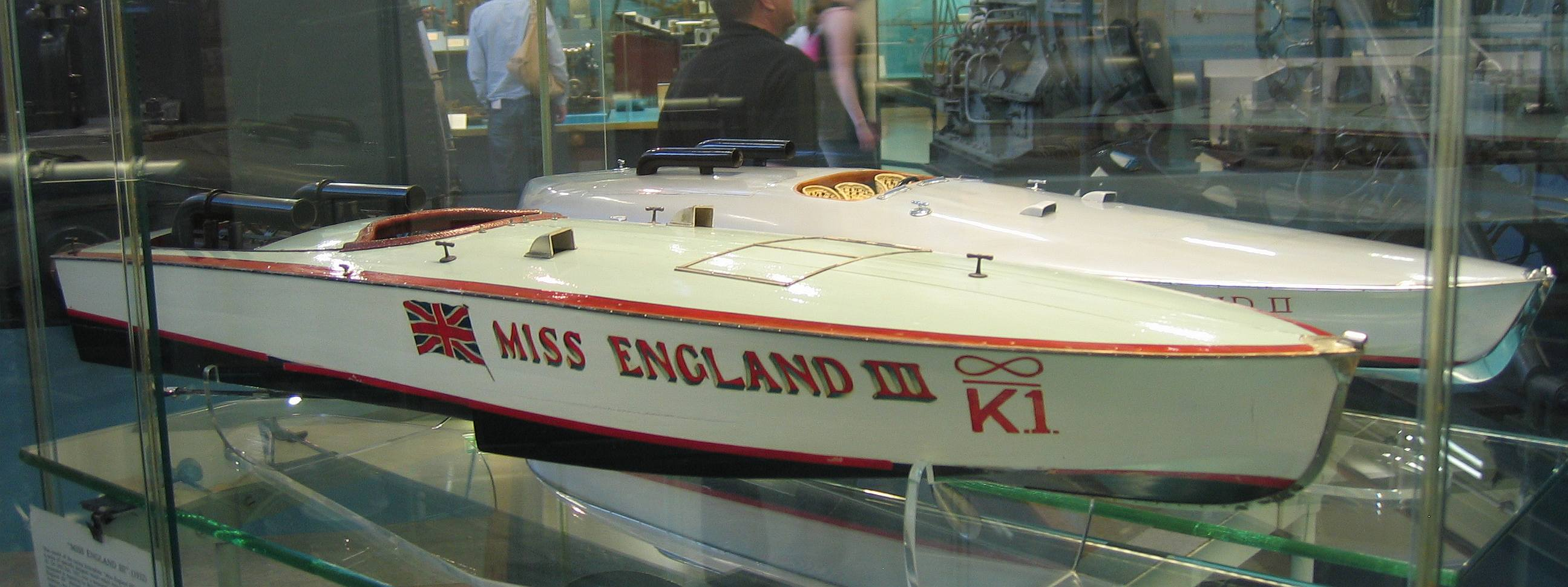
- Model of Miss England III (with Miss England II behind) at the Science Museum, London

History

United Kingdom
- Name: Miss England III
- Owner: Lord Wakefield
- Builder: Thornycroft; Southampton
- Completed: 9 May 1932

General characteristics
- Type: Racing monohull hydroplane
- Length: 35 ft (11 m)
- Beam: 9.5 ft (2.9 m)
- Installed power: 2 × 2,000 hp (1,500 kW) @ 3,000 rpm
- Propulsion: Twin Rolls-Royce R-type V-12 aero engines; Geared drive to twin screws, running @ 9,000 rpm
- Speed: 119.81 mph (104.11 kn; 192.82 km/h) on 18 July 1932, Kaye Don, Loch Lomond

Miss England III was the last of a series of speedboats used by Henry Segrave and Kaye Don to contest world water speed records in the 1920s and 1930s. She was the first craft in the Lloyds Unlimited Group of high-performance speedboats created to make attempts on the water speed record, and consequently wore the registration 'K1' with the corresponding 'infinity' symbol.

== Design and construction ==
Miss England III was built for Lord Wakefield, and delivered to him on 9 May 1932. It differed from the earlier Miss Englands in a number of respects. The hull had a higher freeboard than Miss England II and the stern was a traditional square transom, unlike the pointed sterns of the earlier two boats. The differing appearance of Miss England III led to suggestions that it was inspired by or even copied from Gar Wood's Miss America boats, but on close inspection the similarities were superficial. Miss England III incorporated numerous innovations. Most notably, she was driven by twin screws, while her predecessor had both engines geared to a single screw. The type R engines transplanted from Miss England II were also further developed by improved supercharging, and the maximum rpm was increased by 200. Each engine was connected to its own gearbox, which drove a separate propeller shaft. This arrangement allowed an unconventional throttle arrangement, where the engines could be throttled separately to assist steering. Miss England III was also unusual in being steered by twin aft rudders as well as the more common single forward rudder - each aft rudder was placed immediately behind its corresponding screw.

== Racing career ==
On 18 July 1932, Kaye Don set a new world water speed record of 119.81 mph (104.11 kn; 192.82 km/h) on Loch Lomond. The record stood until August, falling to the four-engined Miss America X at 124.91 mph (108.54 kn; 201.02 km/h).

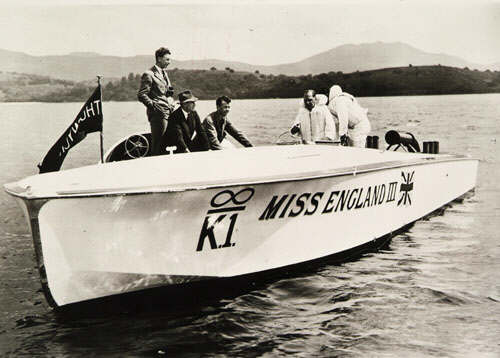
Miss England III on Loch Lomond July 1932

Miss England III was also entered as challenger for the Harmsworth Cup in 1932, to take place on Lake St. Clair, Detroit, Michigan, over September 3–5, with Kaye Don at the helm. Hopes were high after Miss England II had taken one race win in the 1931 event. The defender was the veteran Gar Wood, who would race the latest of his 'Miss America' series of boats, Miss America X. During the first heat, Miss England III led for the first four laps before Wood gained and overtook. As he did so, according to J. Lee Barrett, Don "became surprised and excited, jammed down on the throttle to his starboard engine, loosened the throttle connection and loped the remaining distance on one engine"

In the second heat, Miss England III began slightly ahead, but Wood took the lead at the first turn, and the English boat slowed to a stop during the second lap. Miss England III was then forced to retire with engine failure, while Miss America X. went on to complete the 7 laps of the 35-mile course to retain the Harmsworth Cup for the USA. Initially, the problem was reported to be a breakage of the throttle control to the starboard engine, leading to the stoppage of that engine due to the fouling of its spark plugs; the stoppage had then caused such a strain on the other engine as to make continuation impossible. The following day, Don revealed that the damage to Miss England III had been greater than first thought, and that examination of the port engine had disclosed a broken piston that had damaged a cylinder wall. J. Lee Barrett later wrote that the piston "...tore through the cylinder wall with a deafening roar."

After the Harmsworth Cup, Miss England III did not race again or attempt to regain the water speed record, and Lord Wakefield lent her engines to Sir Malcolm Campbell for his attempt to push the Land Speed Record over 300 mph. The ultimate fate of Miss England III is unclear, though other record-setting vehicles owned by Lord Wakefield were destroyed (including Miss England II) or damaged when an incendiary bomb struck a warehouse in London during the Blitz in October 1940.

== See also ==
- Miss England
- Miss England II
- Miss Britain III
