= Railton Special =

Railton Special, later the Railton Mobil Special
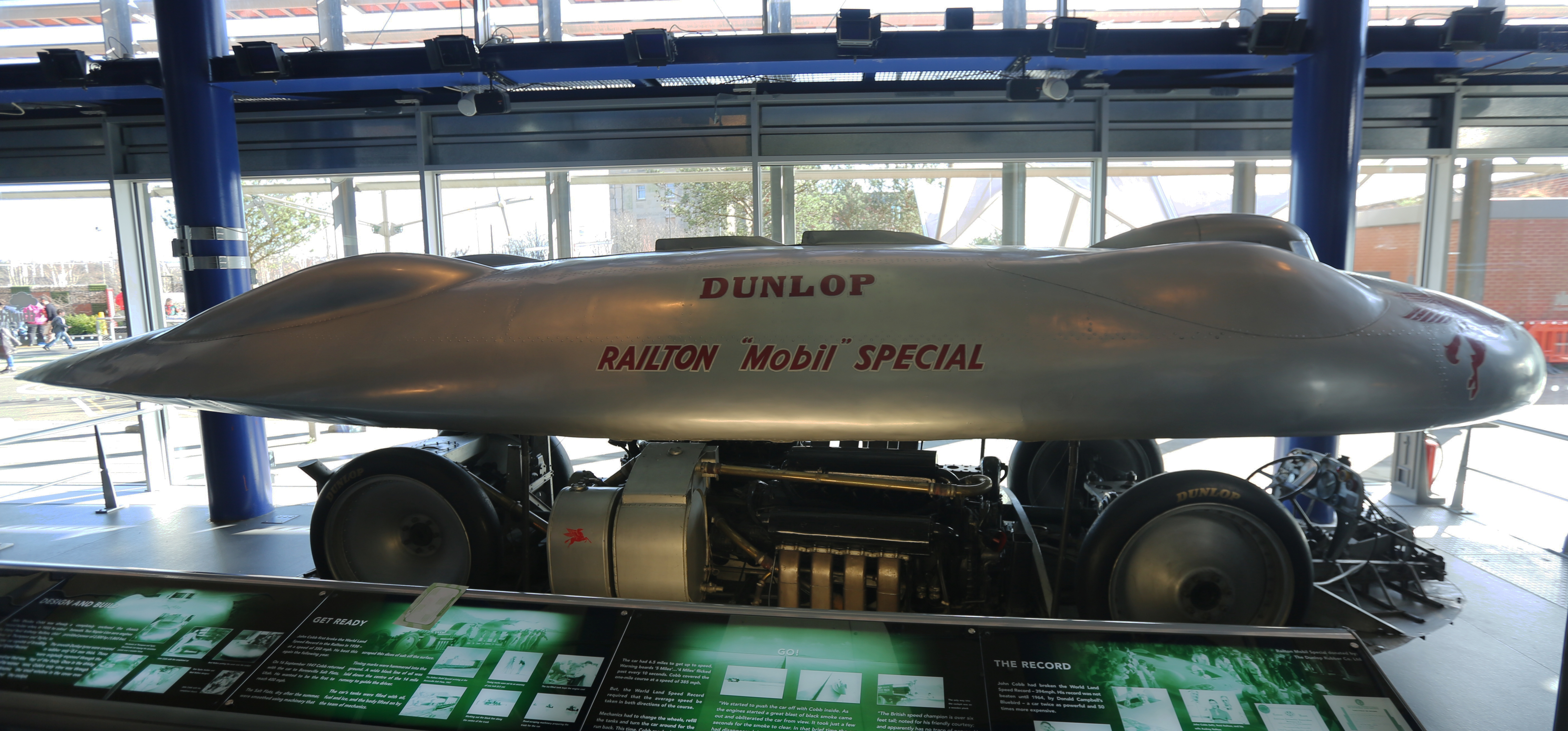
- The Railton Mobil Special on display at the Thinktank Museum, Birmingham.

Overview
- Production: 1
- Designer: Reid Railton

Body and chassis
- Body style: streamlined fully enclosed "turtle shell"

Powertrain
- Engine: Twin Napier Lion W-12 aero engines
- Transmission: Separate drives to front and rear axles

Dimensions
- Length: 28 ft 8 in (8.74 m)
- Width: 8 ft (2.4 m)
- Height: 4 ft 3 in (1.30 m)
- Curb weight: over 3 tonnes

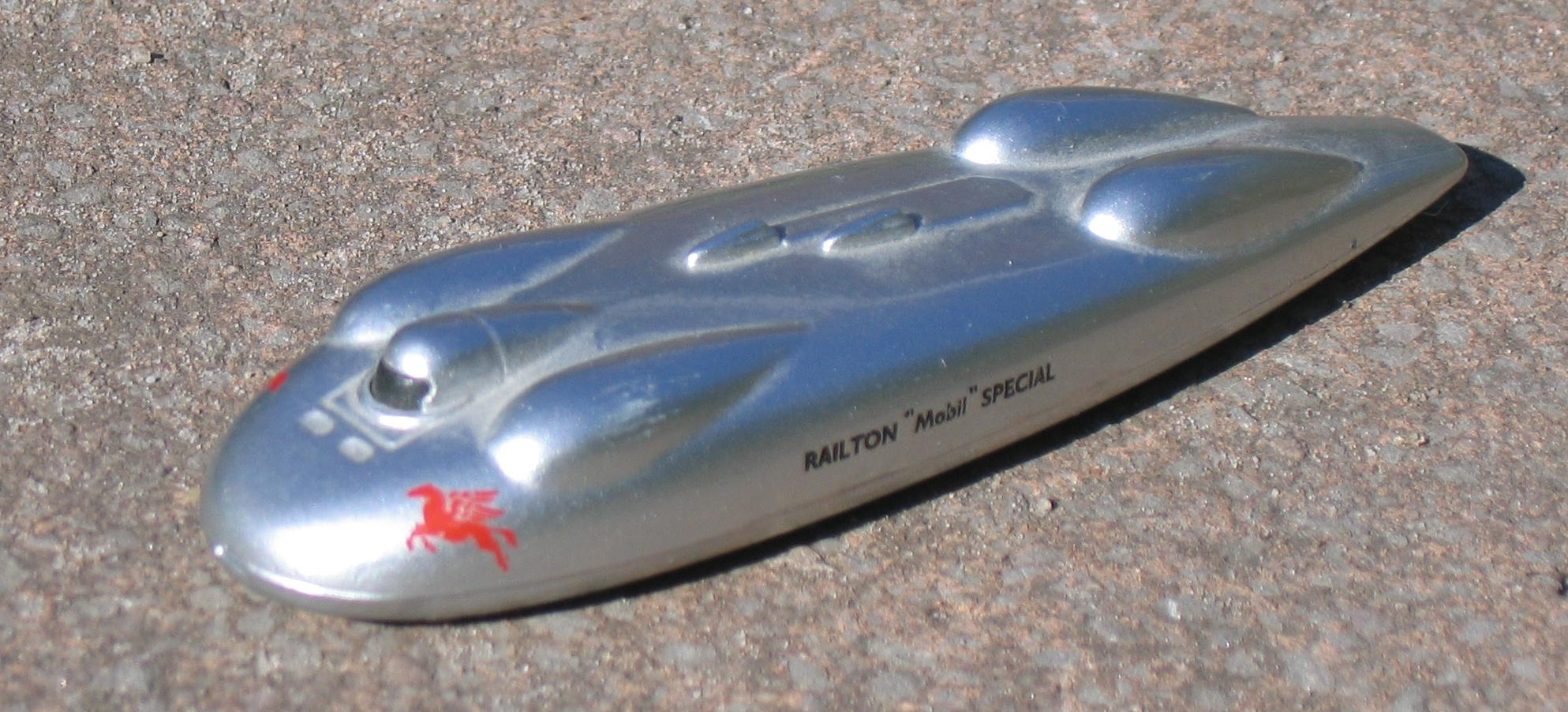
Modern Lledo toy of the Railton Mobil Special

The Railton Special, later rebuilt as the Railton Mobil Special, is a one-off motor vehicle designed by Reid Railton and built for John Cobb's successful attempts at the land speed record in 1938.

It is currently on display at Thinktank, Birmingham Science Museum, England.

== Design ==
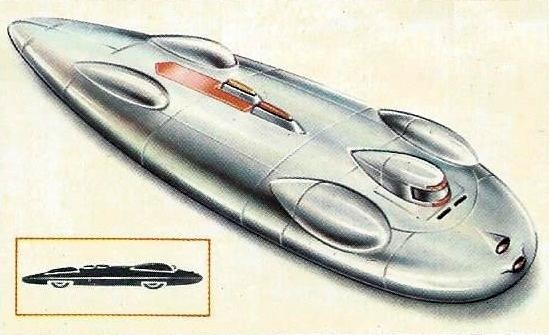

The vehicle was powered by two supercharged Napier Lion VIID (WD) W-12 aircraft engines. These engines were the gift of Marion 'Joe' Carstairs, who had previously used them in her powerboat Estelle V. Coupled together, these two engines made 2,700 hp (2,013 kW) @ 3,600 rpm, and 3,939 lb⋅ft (5,341 N⋅m) of torque. Multiple engines was not a new technique, having already been used by the triple-engined White Triplex and the Railton Special's contemporary rival, Captain Eyston's twin-engined Thunderbolt. With the huge powers thus available, the limitation was in finding a transmission and tyres that could cope. Reid Railton found a simple and ingenious solution to this by simply splitting the drive from each engine to a separate axle, giving four wheel drive.

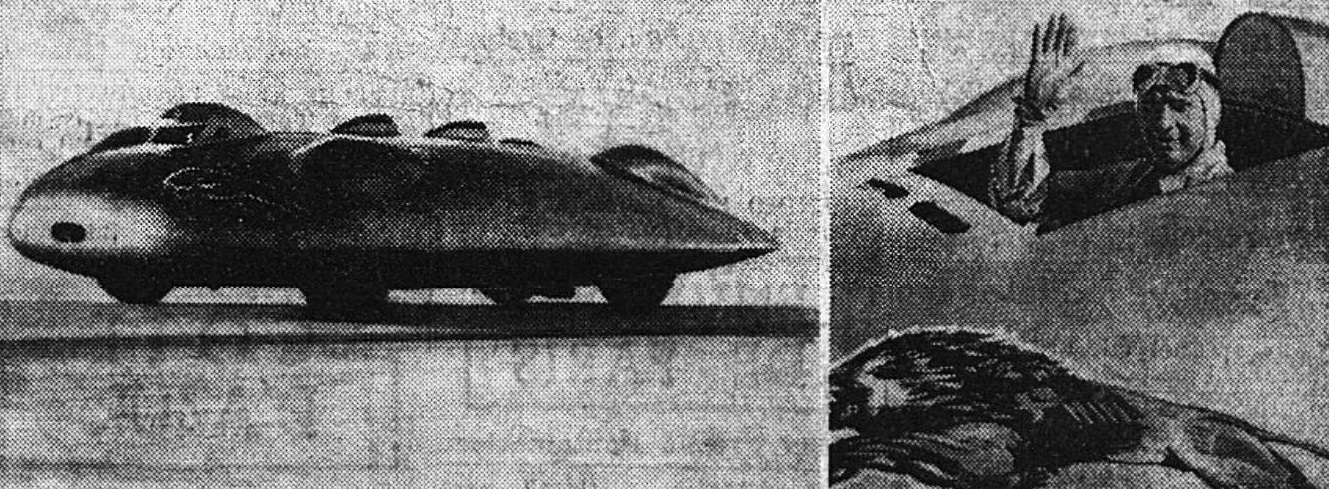
The Railton Special and John Cobb in the cockpit

The vehicle weighed over 3 tonnes and was 28 ft 8 in (8.74 m) long, 8 ft (2.4 m) wide and 4 ft 3 in (1.30 m) high. The front wheels were 5 ft 6 in (1.68 m) apart and the rear 3 ft 6 in (1.07 m). The National Physical Laboratory's wind tunnel was used for testing models of the body.

== Land speed record ==
On 15 September 1938, the Railton Special took the land speed record from Thunderbolt at 353.30 mph (568.58 km/h), also being the first to break the 350 mph (560 km/h) barrier. Eyston re-took the record within 24 hours (357.50 mph / 575.34 km/h), holding it again until Cobb took it a year later on 23 August 1939 at a speed of 369.70 mph (594.97 km/h).

== Further development ==
After the Second World War further development and sponsorship by Mobil Oil led to renaming as the Railton Mobil Special. It was the first ground vehicle to break 400 mph (640 km/h) in a measured test. On 16 September 1947 John Cobb averaged 394.19 mph (634.39 km/h) over the measured mile in both directions (385.6 & 403.1) to take the world land speed record, before the American Goldenrod set a new mark for piston-engined, wheel-driven LSR cars eighteen years later.

== See also ==
- Land speed record
