= Crusader (speedboat) =

Jet-powered speedboat

History
- Name: Crusader
- Owner: John Cobb
- Builder: Vosper & Company, Portsmouth
- Cost: £15,000
- Yard number: 2456
- Laid down: January 1952
- Maiden voyage: July 1952
- Fate: Wrecked on Loch Ness, 29 September 1952

General characteristics
- Displacement: 3 long tons (3.0 t)
- Length: 31 ft (9.4 m)
- Beam: 13 ft across floats
- Installed power: 5,000 lb thrust (static)
- Propulsion: de Havilland Ghost turbojet
- Speed: 206.89 mph (332.96 km/h)
- Crew: 1

Crusader was a jet-powered speed boat piloted by John Cobb.

The combination of an aerodynamically stable hull form and turbojet propulsion was proposed by Reid Railton, Cobb's adviser. A rocket-powered scale model was tested at Haslar. The full size design was by Peter du Cane and built by Vospers of Portsmouth. Technical assistance came from Saunders-Roe and Vickers-Supermarine. It cost £15,000 in 1949.

It was silver and scarlet in colour and 10 m long. The engine was a de Havilland Ghost Mk 48 centrifugal turbojet provided as a loan by the Ministry of Supply at the request of Major Frank Halford, the engine designer. The engine was rated at 5,000 lb thrust fed by two scoop inlets forward of the cockpit.

The hull was of trimaran form, a main hull with a planing step, and two smaller rear-mounted outriggers. Construction was of birch plywood frames and stringers. The hull was skinned in birch ply covered in doped fabric with metal skin reinforcement for planing surfaces. Aircraft-style riveted aluminium was used for the box-section cantilevers to the outriggers.

Expectation was that the boat could achieve more than 200 mph (320 km/h).

The boat was destroyed and Cobb killed on 29 September 1952 when on a world record attempt at Loch Ness, Scotland.

Fifty years later on 5 July 2002 the wreckage of Crusader was discovered by the Loch Ness Project in 200 m (660 ft) of water. The site was designated as a scheduled monument in 2005.

== See also ==
- Water speed record
