= Blue Bird K4 =

World speed record powerboat

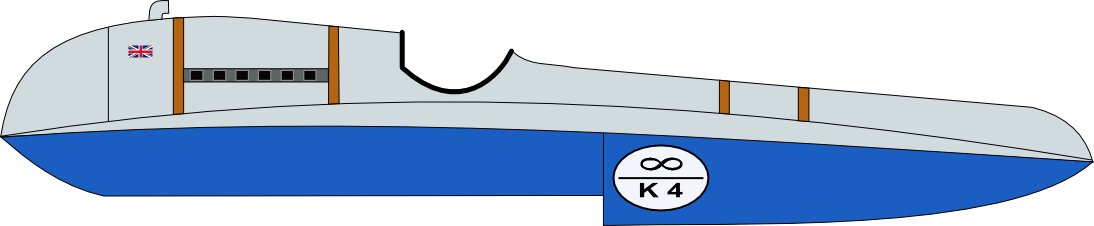
A drawing of the Blue Bird K4

Blue Bird K4 was a powerboat commissioned in 1939 by Sir Malcolm Campbell, to rival the Americans' efforts in the fight for the world water speed record.

The name "K4" was derived from its Lloyd's unlimited rating, and was carried in a prominent circular badge on the forward hull. As this was Campbell's second boat, it was also known as Blue Bird II. He used the name for a series of land speed record cars, his record boats and also his motor yacht. (Note: Malcolm Campbell used the form Blue Bird. His son Donald renamed them as Bluebird.)

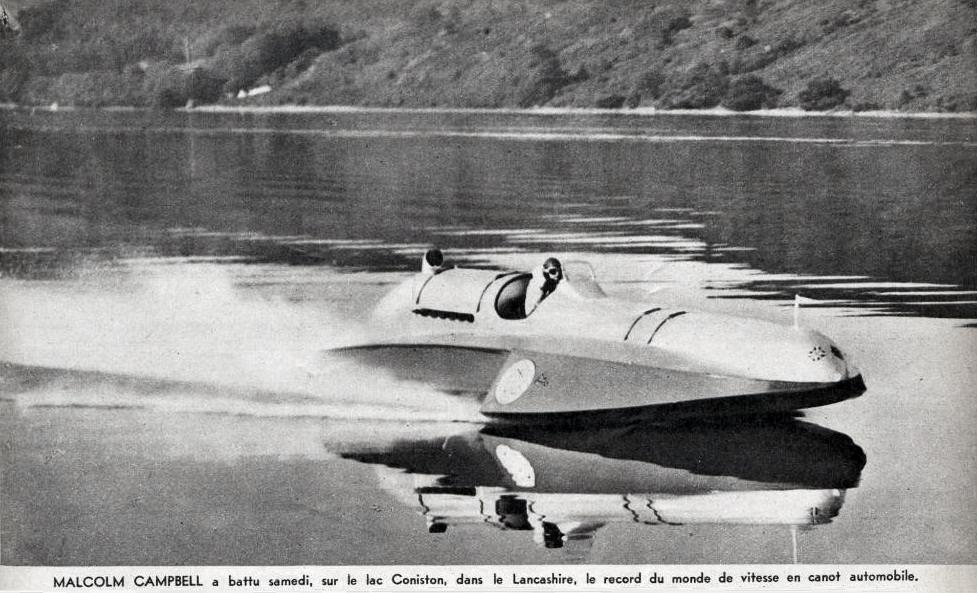
Malcolm Campbell, August 19 1939, with a Bluebird K4 1.750 CV, water world speed record at Coniston Water

K4 was built by Vosper & Company as a replacement for Blue Bird K3, which had set three other water speed records for Malcolm Campbell before the K4 was built. It also used the same Rolls-Royce R engine.

== Design ==
K4 was a three-point hydroplane. Conventional planing powerboats, such as Miss England or Blue Bird K3, have a single keel, with an indent or "step" projecting from the bottom of the hull. At speed, the force on this step is enough to lift the bow upward, reducing the wetted surface area of the hull and thus also the frictional drag. A "three pointer" has two distinctly separate floats fitted to the front, and a third point at the rear of the hull. When the boat increases in speed, most of the hull lifts out of the water and planes on these three contact points alone. These points, being even smaller in area than the planing hull of a monohull hydroplane, have even less drag. Having a broad spacing between the front planing points, the three-pointer is less susceptible to instability caused by small disturbances than is a monohull. However, if the bow lifts beyond its safety margin, the aerodynamic forces (not the hydrodynamic forces of the water) on the broad forward area of the hull will cause it to "kite" upwards, leading to a somersault and crash. This is what happened to both Slo-mo-shun and (possibly) Bluebird K7.

== Records ==
K4 set one world water speed record on 19 August 1939 on Coniston Water, Lancashire (now in Cumbria, at 141.740 mph (228.108 km/h or 123.168 kn).

== Jet engine trials ==
After the Second World War, Sir Malcolm unsuccessfully re-engined K4 with a de Havilland Goblin turbojet engine but did not gain any records. The new superstructure did gain the nickname 'The Coniston Slipper' .

== Donald Campbell ==
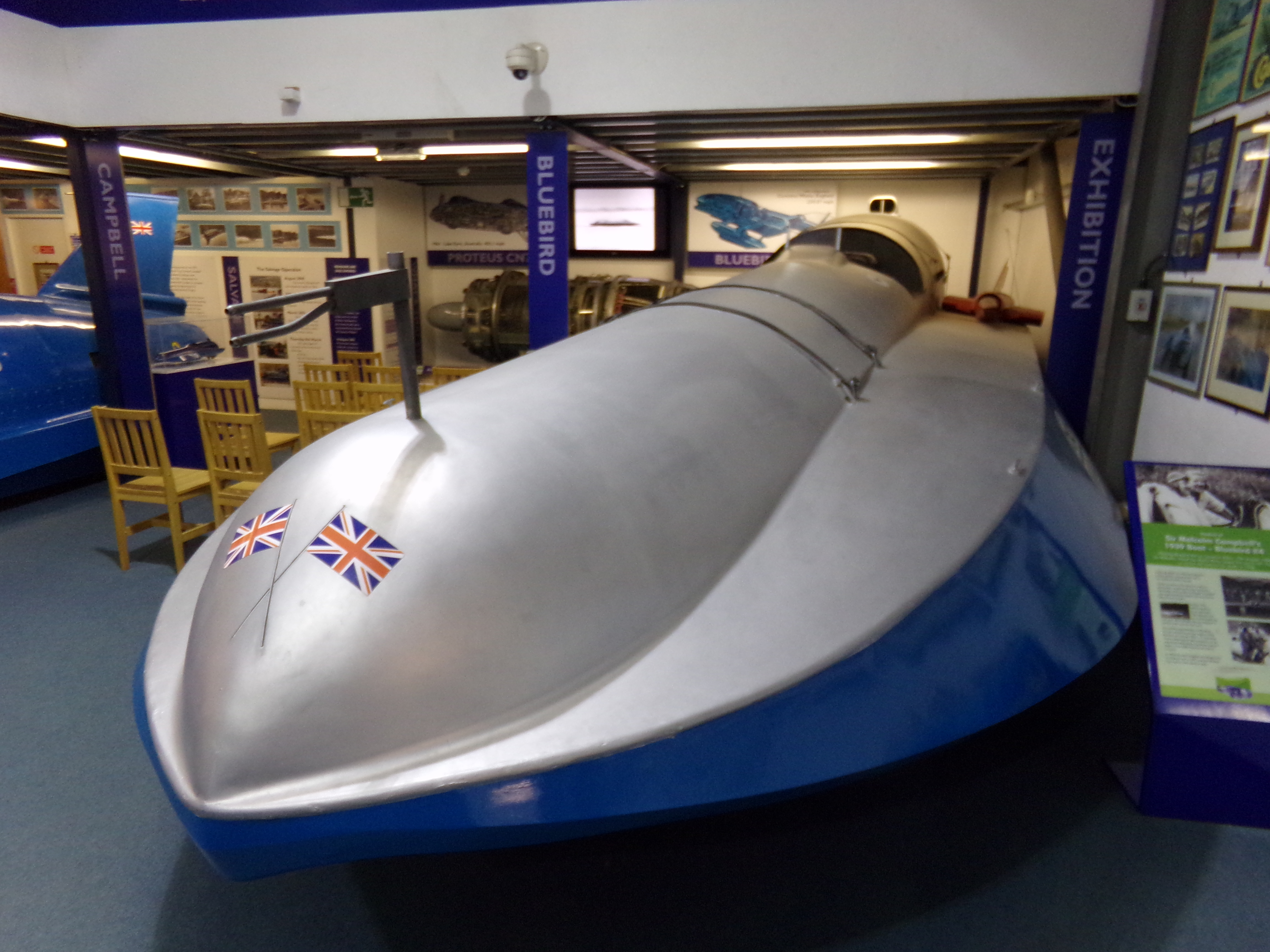
Replica Bluebird K4 today (Lakeland Motor Museum near Ulverston)

Donald Campbell (Malcolm's son) had not previously attempted record-breaking, but after Sir Malcolm's death at the end of 1948, the threat of an American challenge to his water speed record spurred him to defend it. Under the terms of his will, Sir Malcolm's possessions, including the record breakers, were auctioned off and Donald was forced to buy them back. K4 was then re-engined with a propeller and one of the previous Rolls-Royce R engines.

Donald tried the boat and carried out many modifications, including converting the craft to a “prop rider” configuration, whereby the propeller hub, rather than the transom, is the aft point of contact with the water. In this form, it was tested at speeds approaching the current record of 179 mph but sustained damage during one such test in 1951. It is generally accepted that K4 struck a submerged object at high speed, although it has also been suggested that the damage was actually caused by a catastrophic transmission failure. Whatever the cause, the damage was considered irreparable and, following the removal of the engine and other usable components, the hull was broken up and burned on the shore of Coniston Water. Donald Campbell subsequently commissioned the design and construction of the jet-powered Bluebird K7, in which Donald set several records, then died during a final record attempt in 1967.

A replica of K4 currently is on show at the Lakeland Motor Museum, Backbarrow.

== Sources ==
- Harris, Fred (2000). Skimming the Surface. Ainsdale Press.
- Tremayne, David (2005). Donald Campbell: The Man Behind the Mask. Bantam Books. ISBN 0-553-81511-3.
