= Miss England II =

Speedboat built to beat the naval speed record

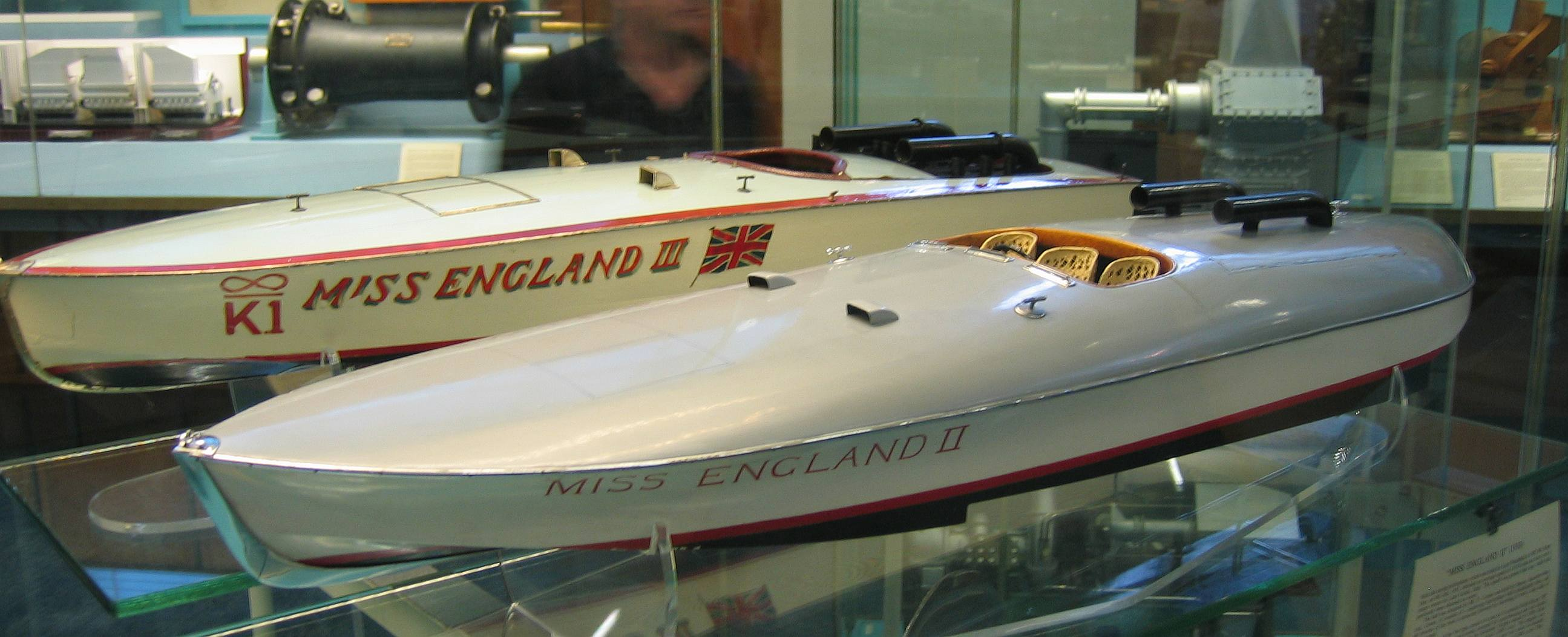
- Model of Miss England II (with model of Miss England III behind) at the Science Museum, London

History

United Kingdom
- Name: Miss England II
- Owner: Lord Wakefield
- Builder: Saunders-Roe; Cowes; Designer: Fred Cooper
- Launched: 1930

General characteristics
- Type: Racing monohull hydroplane
- Displacement: 5 tons
- Length: 36 ft (11 m)
- Beam: 10 ft (3.0 m)
- Installed power: 2 × 1,800 hp (1,300 kW) @ 2,800 rpm
- Propulsion: Twin Rolls-Royce R-type V-12 aero engines; Geared drive to twin-bladed 16 in (410 mm) single screw of 11.75 in (298 mm) pitch, running @ 11,000 rpm
- Speed: 98.76 mph (85.82 kn; 158.94 km/h), Sir Henry Segrave, 13 June 1930, Windermere; 110.28 mph (95.83 kn; 177.48 km/h), Kaye Don, 9 July 1931, Lake Garda
- Crew: 3

Miss England II was the second of a series of speedboats used by Henry Segrave and Kaye Don to contest world water speed records in the 1920s and 1930s.

== Design and construction ==
Miss England II was built in 1930 for Lord Wakefield, who had obtained a pair of new Rolls-Royce type R V-12 air-racing engines. Mounted aft of the cockpit, they turned a single propeller shaft via a gearbox mounted near the bow. The shaft ran aft below the hull to a twin-bladed screw, first of 11.75 inches diameter and later, in trials, of 9 inches.

The stepped hull design was similar to that of the previous Miss England. On Miss England II, the step was separate from the hull, so that with the boat withdrawn from the water it could be unbolted and moved fore or aft to balance the boat for speed.

The cockpit accommodated a crew of three, with engineer and mechanic in the left and right seats and driver amidships.

== Death of Segrave ==
On Friday 13 June 1930, Segrave drove Miss England II to a new record of 98.76 mph (85.82 kn; 158.94 km/h) average over two runs on Windermere. On a third run the boat, which is presumed to have hit a floating branch, capsized at speed. Chief engineer Victor Halliwell, at the "low" side of the boat as it turned over on top of him, was killed. His mechanic, Michael "Jack" Willcocks, thrown clear from the 'high' side of the boat, survived with a broken arm. Segrave, who was rescued unconscious as the boat sank, regained consciousness for a moment and asked about the fate of "the lads". Shortly after being told that he had broken the record, he died from lung injuries. Concerns were raised that the boat's hull was too light in design and construction, particularly around the hydroplane's step, which was found to have partially detached.

An early theory that the step had failed as the boat passed over its own wake from a previous run was discounted after a waterlogged branch showing recent impact damage drifted ashore some thirty minutes after the accident.

== Final record ==
Following Segrave’s death, Miss England II was salvaged and repaired, and Kaye Don was again chosen as the driver for 1931. Early that year, Don tested the boat on Lough Neagh, near Belfast, Northern Ireland, and reached an unofficial speed of 107 mph. Garfield Wood then established the official record at over 100 mph (87 kn; 160 km/h). A month later, on Lake Garda, Italy, Don raised it to 110.28 mph (95.83 kn; 177.48 km/h). In February 1932 Wood raised it again, by 1 mph (0.87 kn; 1.6 km/h).

== Controversy over the 1931 race ==
In 1931, a race on the Detroit River was billed as a match between the Wood brothers, Gar (in the new Miss America IX) and George (in the previous year's Miss America VIII), and the Englishman Kaye Don, driving Miss England II. In front of an estimated crowd of over a million spectators, Don won the first heat of the race. Miss America IX had suffered hull damage from Miss England's wake and, despite overnight repairs, she was barely ready the next day. Wood requested a delay to allow the repairs to be completed, something to which he had previously conceded. Don stuck to the rules, which according to one author still rankled with some Americans in 2003. Miss America IX made it to the second heat, but only by Wood racing flat-out to the start line. Wood had a narrow lead over Don when Miss England II suddenly flipped over rounding one of the turns, but without injury to Don and his co-driver. Wood finished the race, but both he and Don were disqualified because they had jumped the starter's gun by seven seconds. George Wood completed the final race to win the trophy.

== See also ==
- Miss England (speedboat)
