= Reid Railton =

British automotive engineer (1895–1977)

Reid Anthony Railton
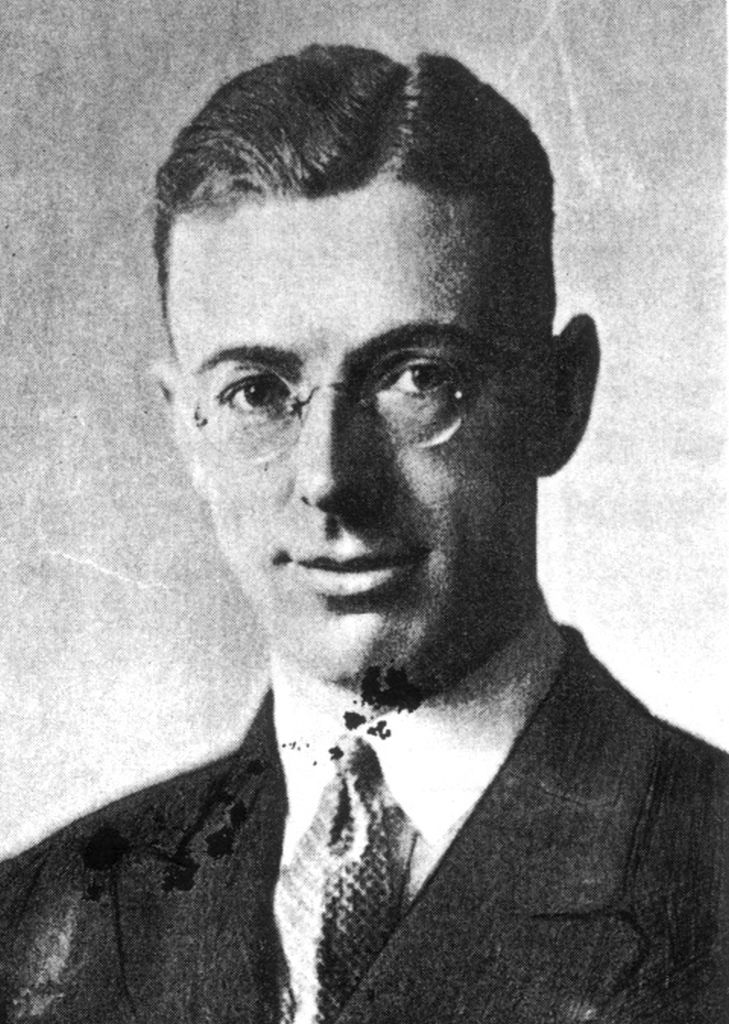
- Born: 25 June 1895
- Died: 1 September 1977 (aged 82); Berkeley, California
- Education: Rugby School, Manchester University
- Occupations: Designer of land and water speed record vehicles
- Employer: Thomson & Taylor

Reid Anthony Railton (25 June 1895 – 1 September 1977) was a British automotive engineer, and designer of land and water speed record vehicles.

== Biography ==
Reid Anthony Railton was the son of a Manchester stockbroker: Charles Withingon Railton and his wife Charlotte Elizabeth (née Sharman), Reid was born in Chorley, Alderley Edge, Cheshire and was christened on 13 August 1895 at the local parish church. He was educated at Rugby School and Manchester University. He joined Leyland Motors in 1917 where he worked with J.G. Parry-Thomas on the Leyland Eight luxury car. He left in 1922 to set up the Arab Motor Company where he was chief designer. Only about twelve cars were built, of which two low-chassis cars survive. One is in the Isle of Man and the other one (chassis number 6, engine number 10, registration UW 2) is now in Austria having been rebuilt and rebodied by David Barker in the early 1990s.

In 1927, on the death of his friend Parry-Thomas, Railton closed the Arab factory and moved to Brooklands working for Thomson & Taylor becoming their Technical Director with responsibility for John Cobb's 1933 Napier Railton car which took the Outer Circuit record in 1933 and Sir Malcolm Campbell's Blue Bird Land Speed Record cars of 1931 to 1935. His greatest achievements were probably in designing the Railton Special car with which John Cobb set the Land Speed Record at 394.7 mph (635.2 km/h) in 1947 and designing the E.R.A. racing cars built in 1933–34 at Thompson & Taylors at Brooklands. He also tuned the Hudson chassis used on the Railton car, named after him.

As well as cars he designed high-speed boats, including the jet-powered Crusader in which John Cobb was killed in 1952 while travelling in excess of 200 mph (322 km/h) attempting to break the Water Speed Record.

In 1939 he moved to California to work for the Hall-Scott Motor Company. He died in Berkeley, California, on 1 September 1977 at the age of 82.

== Vehicles designed by Reid Railton ==
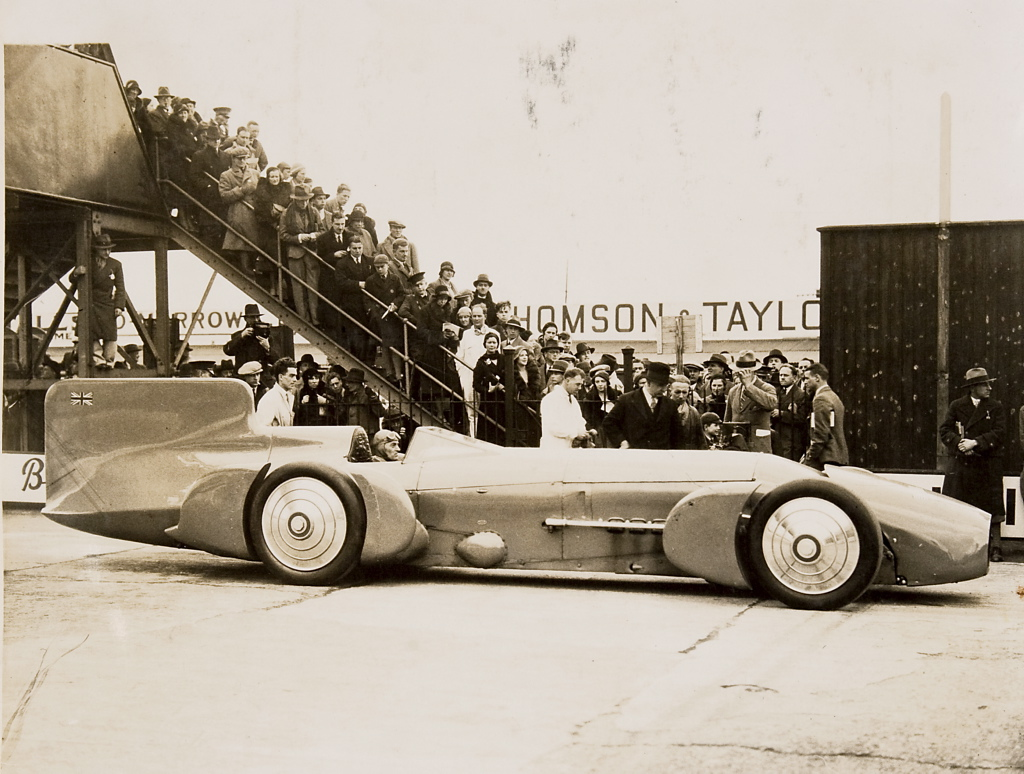
Sir Malcolm Campbell at the wheel of the "Bluebird", with crowd, 1926 - 1936

- Campbell-Napier-Railton Blue Bird
- Campbell-Railton Blue Bird
- Crusader (speedboat)
- Leyland Eight
- Napier-Railton
- Railton Mobil Special
- Railton Special

== See also ==
- Railton (car)
- Vehicles designed by Reid Railton
