= Royal Air Force Marine Branch =

Air-sea rescue service

RAF Marine Branch
- Royal Air Force Ensign
- Active: 1918 – 8 January 1986
- Disbanded: Yes
- Country: United Kingdom
- Branch: Royal Air Force
- Motto: The Sea Shall Not Have Them

The Marine Branch (1918–1986) was a branch of the Royal Air Force (RAF) which operated watercraft in support of RAF operations. Just days after the creation of the RAF itself, the Marine Craft Section (MCS) was created with the transfer of Royal Naval Air Service (RNAS) vessels and personnel to the new service. Originally tasked with the support of RNAS, and later RAF, seaplanes, Marine Craft Section was to achieve its greatest size during the Second World War, and achieved fame for its role in air-sea rescue operations. After the war MCS was granted full branch status on 11 December 1947; however, post-war the role of the new branch became greatly reduced with the end of the British Empire, the withdrawal of flying boats from service, and the increasing use of helicopters in air-sea rescue. The branch was disestablished on 8 January 1986.

== History ==
=== Formation ===
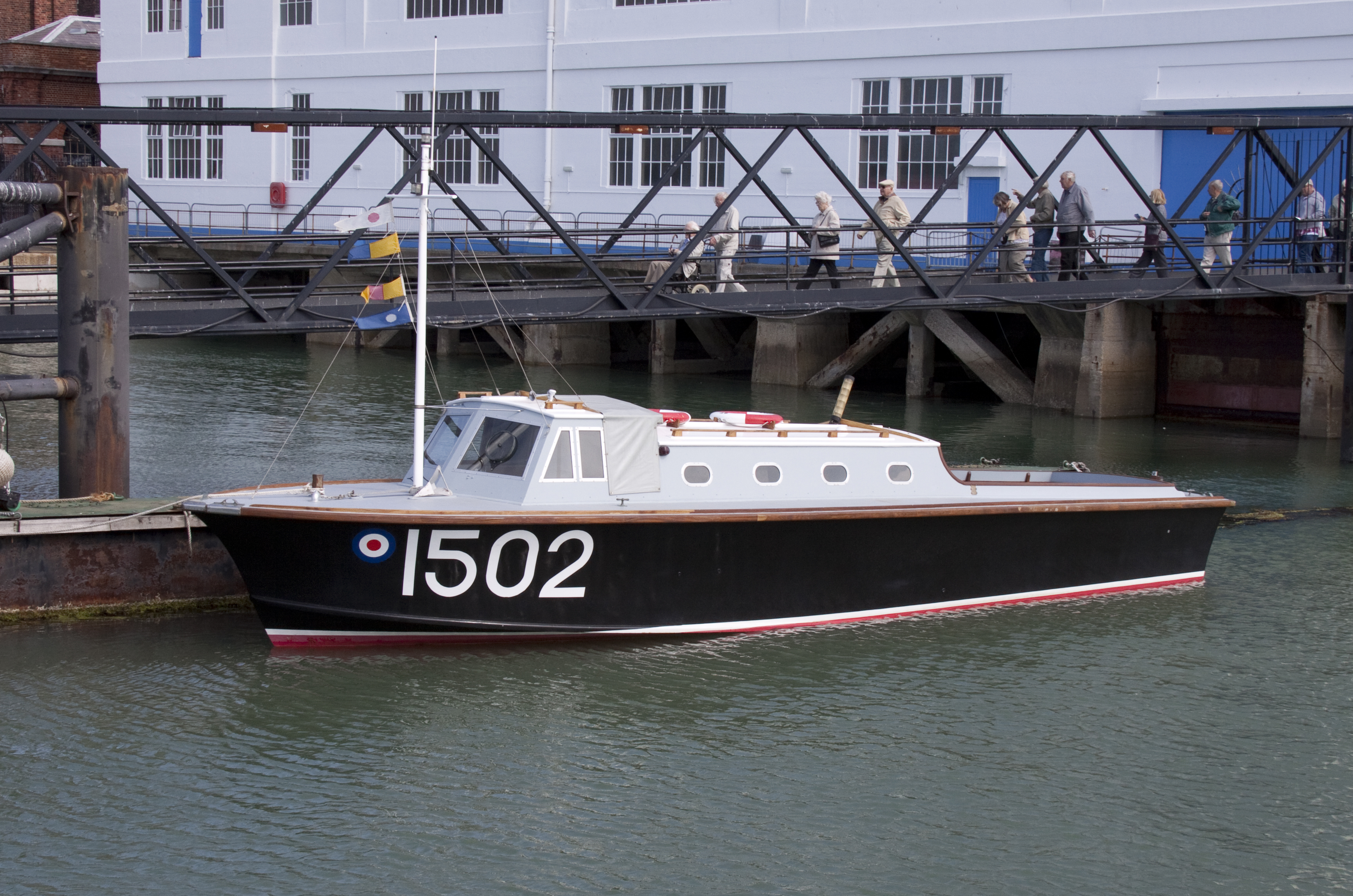
RAF seaplane tender 1502 in 2011

In 1918 the RAF was established through the merging of the aviation arms of the Royal Navy, the Royal Navy Air Service (RNAS), and that of the Army, the Royal Flying Corps. During the First World War the RNAS had structured its force to protect Britain from both surface sea and air attack. Against surface attack the RNAS had built up a force of seaplanes and in support of these had accumulated between 300 and 500 vessels of various kind including pinnaces, lighters, launches, motorboats, depot ships and other vessels. These were used as primarily as seaplane tenders. The term seaplane tender in British usage being used for small watercraft of launch to pinnace size used as tenders, what in United States usage would be called a seaplane tender the British would call a seaplane depot ship.

These craft were used to ferry crews, stores and supplies between shore and the aircraft, to maintain the buoys used to mark out "taxiways" and "runways" and to keep these clear of debris to prevent foreign object damage, and in the case of emergency to act as rescue craft and airport crash tenders. All those functions that on land would require wheeled ground support equipment had a need for a watercraft equivalent. Other vessels were equipped as high speed target tugs, pickets and for range safety. On the creation of the RAF, along with the seaplanes they served, these RNAS vessels and their crews would become the RAF's Marine Craft Section (MCS), However, the Navy was from the start opposed to and did its best to prevent the creation of the new service, of the vessels that were now theoretically part of the RAF some could not be found; others were carried aboard Royal Navy vessels that were not part of the RNAS transfer, and to which the RAF had no option but to accede to their transfer back to the Navy. The MCS officers tasked with carrying out an inventory of the new service's assets concluded that achieving the transfer of 323 vessels was possible. However, of those boats handed over, because of their war service, some 50% were unserviceable, with some in such a poor state of repair as to be totally unseaworthy.

=== Interwar ===
In the interwar period the MCS contracted to a force of 150 vessels, which in addition to supporting the operation of seaplanes were equipped for rescue operations, with a launch being at the ready whenever an aircraft was flying over water. However, the training and seamanship of the crews, especially with regards to navigation, and the fact that these boats were hard pressed to make 10 kn (12 mph; 19 km/h), meant that the MCS at this time was only capable of inshore rescue operations. The MCS were subdivided into Marine Craft Units (MCU) with individual units assigned to an individual RAF Coastal Command seaplane base. In 1921 the RAF was officially granted its own ensign, to the dissatisfaction of the Navy, and henceforth MCS vessels would fly the Royal Air Force Ensign.

As the vessels it had inherited from the Navy began to wear out the MCS began to have built for it launches capable of higher speeds and - in light of the larger crews of some aircraft - greater capacity. The arrival of high speed craft into the MCS was driven in part by T. E. Lawrence, better known as "Lawrence of Arabia", whilst an airman at RAF Mount Batten; Lawrence had previously witnessed the drowning of the crew of a seaplane when the seaplane tender sent to their rescue was too slow in arriving. Working with Hubert Scott-Paine, the designer of the record-breaking Miss Britain III and Miss England boats and founder of the British Power Boat Company (BPBC), the 37.5 ft (11.4 m) long ST 200 Seaplane Tender Mk1 was introduced into service. These boats had a range of 140 mi (230 km) when cruising at 24 kn (28 mph; 44 km/h), and could achieve a top speed of 29 kn (33 mph; 54 km/h). As even faster boats became available many of the ST 200s were converted into fireboats.

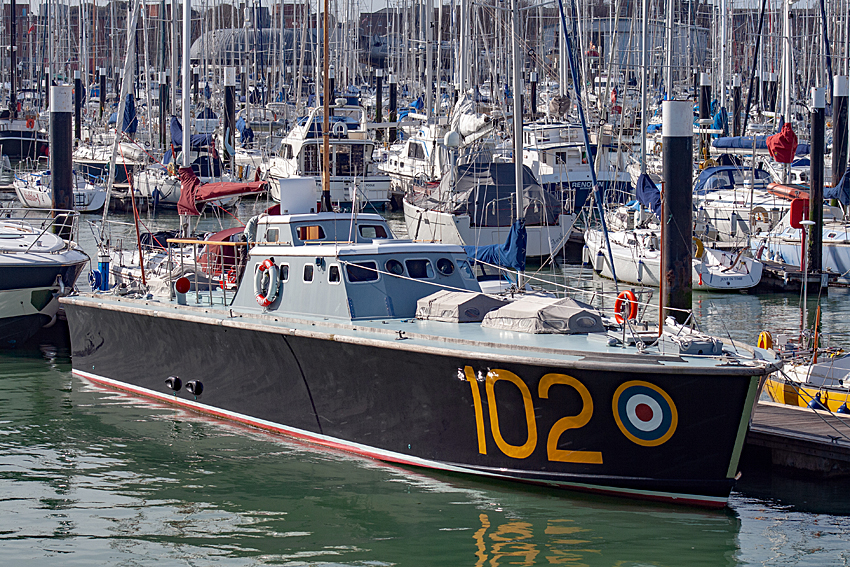
HSL 102 at Gosport

The work of the BPBC would lead in the late 1930s to the RAF 100 class High Speed Launch (HSL). Based on the elongated hull of a 64 ft (20 m) Motor Torpedo Boat, the RAF 100 was designed to have a maximum speed of 35 knots (40 mph; 65 km/h), and achieved over 39 knots (45 mph; 72 km/h) during trials, making it one of the fastest boats of the time.

However, the internal arrangements of the RAF 100 was to prove vulnerable to combat damage, its high deck made the recovery of aircrew in the water difficult, and for wartime use it was underarmed. These shortcomings were rectified in the Type Two 63 ft HSL, nicknamed the "Whaleback" from its deck shape.

=== Second World War ===
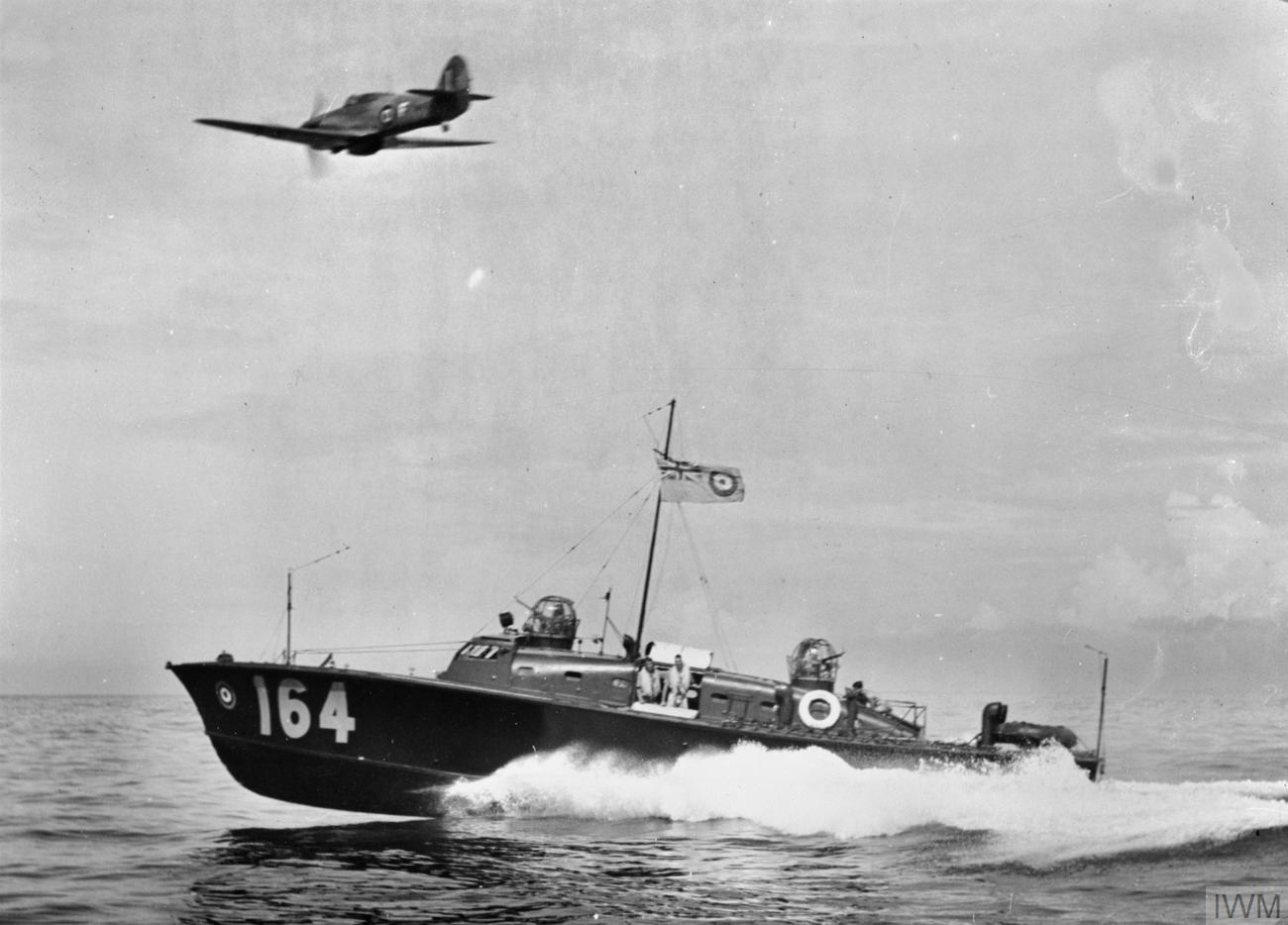
Whaleback high speed air-sea rescue launch HSL 164 off Ceylon in 1943

As Britain entered the Second World War the MCS found itself ill-prepared for war. During the Battle of Britain the MCS could only keep 10 of 13 High Speed Launches available for air-sea rescue operations at any one time, and the high performance of the craft was brought at the expense of engines which had a service life of only 360 hours. The HSLs were also individually assigned to individual Coastal Command bases, primarily to support the operation of those squadrons based there. Although theoretically available for rescue operations, in general this was done on an uncoordinated ad hoc basis. Even with the help of civilian vessels and the Royal Navy, aircrew who baled out or ditched in the North Sea and English Channel had only a 20% chance of being returned to their squadrons. Between mid July 1940 and October Britain lost 215 hard-to-replace pilots and aircrew to the seas.

In light of this, in 1941, an emergency meeting was convened by Air Marshal Sir Arthur "Bomber" Harris. The Royal Navy offered to take over in its entirety the at sea rescue role, the RAF declined and subsequently created the Directorate of Air Sea Rescue on 6 February 1941, which adopted the motto "The sea shall not have them". Operationally it was to become known as Air Sea Rescue Services (ASRS), which later became the RAF Search and Rescue Force. The headquarters of the ASRS was co-located with that of Coastal Command with which it was to operate closely.

As more High Speed Launches became available these were formed into new dedicated Air Sea Rescue Units (ASRU). Together with the expansion of the ASRS component of the MCS, the ASRS worked to improve the survival of aircrews through the development and issue of better individual survival equipment-including one-man inflatable dinghies for fighter pilots copied from the Germans, the training of aircrew in ditching drills to maximise their chances of surviving to be retrieved, the development and fielding of air droppable survival equipment, and better coordination and collaboration amongst the different services, branches and units in the locating and retrieval of downed airmen.

The air-sea rescue squadrons of the ASRS flew a variety of aircraft, usually hand-me-downs rejected or withdrawn from front-line service by the RAF's other branches or, as in the case of the Walrus, begged from the Navy. They used Supermarine Spitfires and Boulton Paul Defiants to patrol for downed aircrew and Avro Ansons to drop supplies and dinghies. Supermarine Walrus and Supermarine Sea Otter amphibious craft were used to pick up aircrew from the water. Larger aircraft were used to drop airborne lifeboats. Although the Walrus and Sea Otters could pick up survivors in calm seas, further out to sea and in rougher waters, it was still not possible for aircraft to routinely pick up survivors, the large flying boats that could do so, such as the Catalinas and Short Sunderlands of Coastal Command, had many other jobs to do and were not always available. The role of aircraft in the ASRS therefore, was to locate downed airmen and to keep them alive, by dropping them survival equipment and stores, until an ASRS launch, or one from the Royal Navy's Naval Sea Rescue Services, arrived to pick them up. Generally MCS launches had responsibility for the Channel and North Sea, and Navy ones for the Western Approaches, although a number of MCS launches were based in Northern Ireland.

In addition to more and better "whalebacks", the ASRUs would acquire United States built powerboats under Lend-Lease, known as "Miamis" in RAF service, from the name of their builder. These boats were not used in home waters. In addition to High Speed Launches, the MCS would also acquire larger craft, such as the Fairmile D derived "115 Foot Long Range Rescue Craft" (LRRC), these traded outright top speed for much better seakeeping and range. The MCS craft also became much better armed, sporting multiple machine guns in powered turrets derived from those found in the RAF's multiengined bombers. By convention craft with weapons in front of the deckhouse are not considered rescue craft, and the MCS craft disposed its armament in the amidships, wing, and aft deck positions. This was achieved despite the ship yards and boat builders of Britain coming under the control of the Admiralty, and which ensured that the needs of the Navy were met first, for example the MCS's LRRCs, only being delivered once the naval need for motor torpedo boats was satisfied.

By the end of the Second World War, more than 8,000 aircrew and 5,000 civilians had been rescued, and the MCS had some 300 HSLs and over a thousand other vessels, located not just in the waters around the United Kingdom, but everywhere around the world. The largest fleet of such rescue craft in the world. This fleet and the RAF sailors that crewed it would contract as Britain entered peacetime, however it continued be found everywhere that the RAF flew over water. On 11 December 1947 the MCS was granted full branch status and on 25 June 1948 the largest of its vessels, of 68 feet (21 m) or more, were granted the ship prefix His Majesty's Air Force Vessel (HMAFV).

=== Postwar and demise ===
As the British withdrew from Empire, and aircraft reliability improved, the need for rescue craft to provide cover for the routes that the troop planes and supply transports flew waned, and with the withdrawal from service of flying boats a large part of the Branch's reason to exist disappeared.

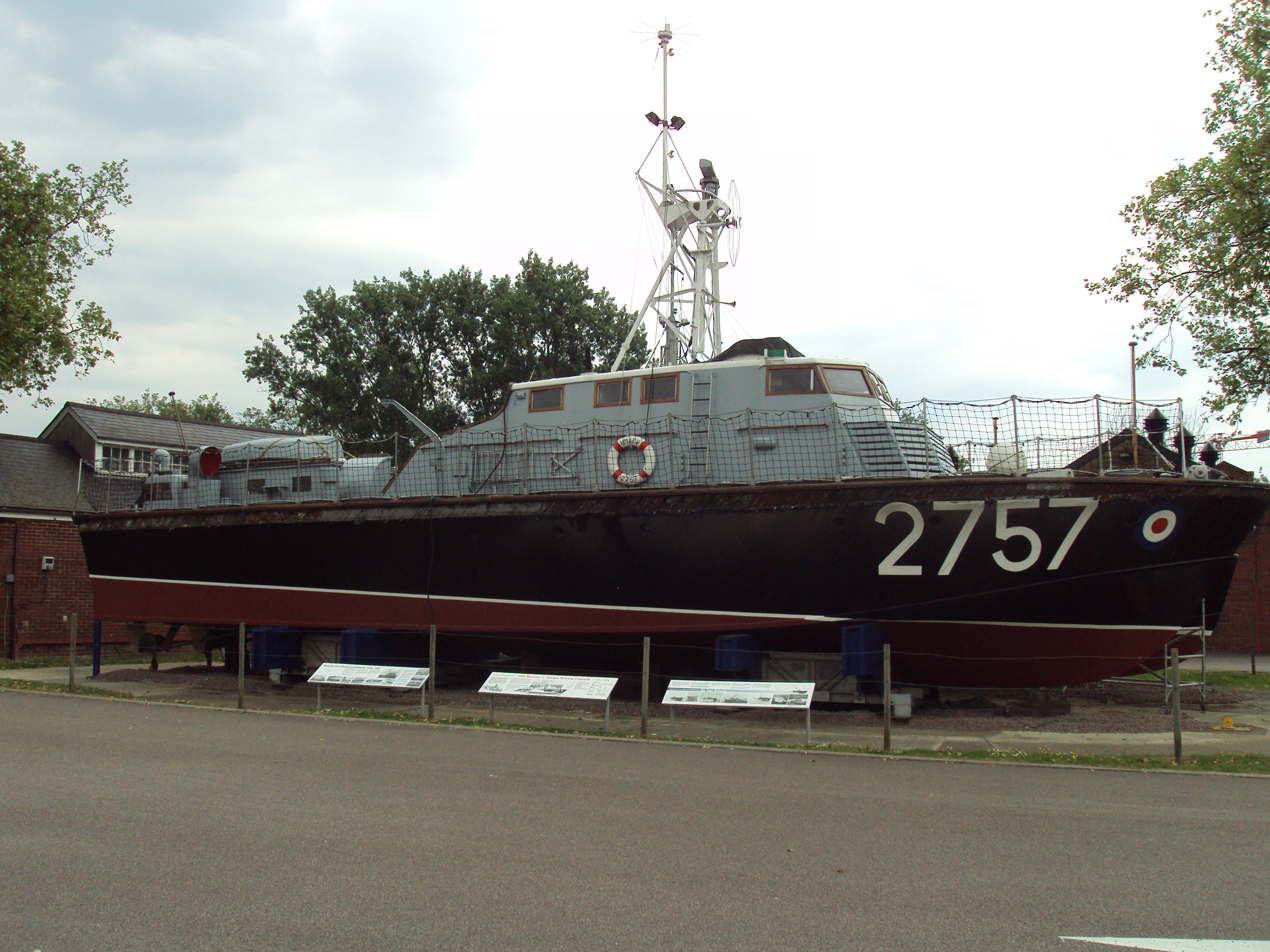
Rescue & Target Towing Launch (RTTL) 2757, built in 1957, in the Grounds of the Royal Air Force Museum London, Hendon

In the early 1950s, helicopters had begun to replace fixed–wing aircraft and supplement the marine craft in the search and rescue role, with the introduction of the Westland Wessex and later the Westland Sea King, it was now possible to consider the replacement of marine craft in all sea and weather conditions. However, even into the 1970s helicopters had not completely replaced RAF marine craft, even though, by this time, the Marine Branch craft were becoming increasingly elderly and service in the Branch increasingly unattractive. Physically isolated from the majority of RAF bases and personnel, with the withdrawal of the flying boats and the absorption of Coastal Command into Strike Command, the majority of RAF bases were now inland: the Marine Branch becoming largely forgotten and neglected by the rest of the Royal Air Force. The only interaction between the Marine Branch and the rest of the RAF was when the Branch had to draw supplies from another base, or when aircrew arrived at Mount Batten for safety and survival training. Associating the RAF with the conducting of flight operations, other members of the RAF, like the public at large, were often unaware that the RAF had its own marine craft or why they were needed, and when they did become aware of the fact, found it strange and surprising.

HMAFV Stirling (4002), a Spitfire Class Rescue Target Towing Launch Mk.III, and its crew were used for the filming of the Secret Army TV drama series episode Prisoner of War in 1978. Stirling's RAF Number 4002 is clearly visible in the episode.

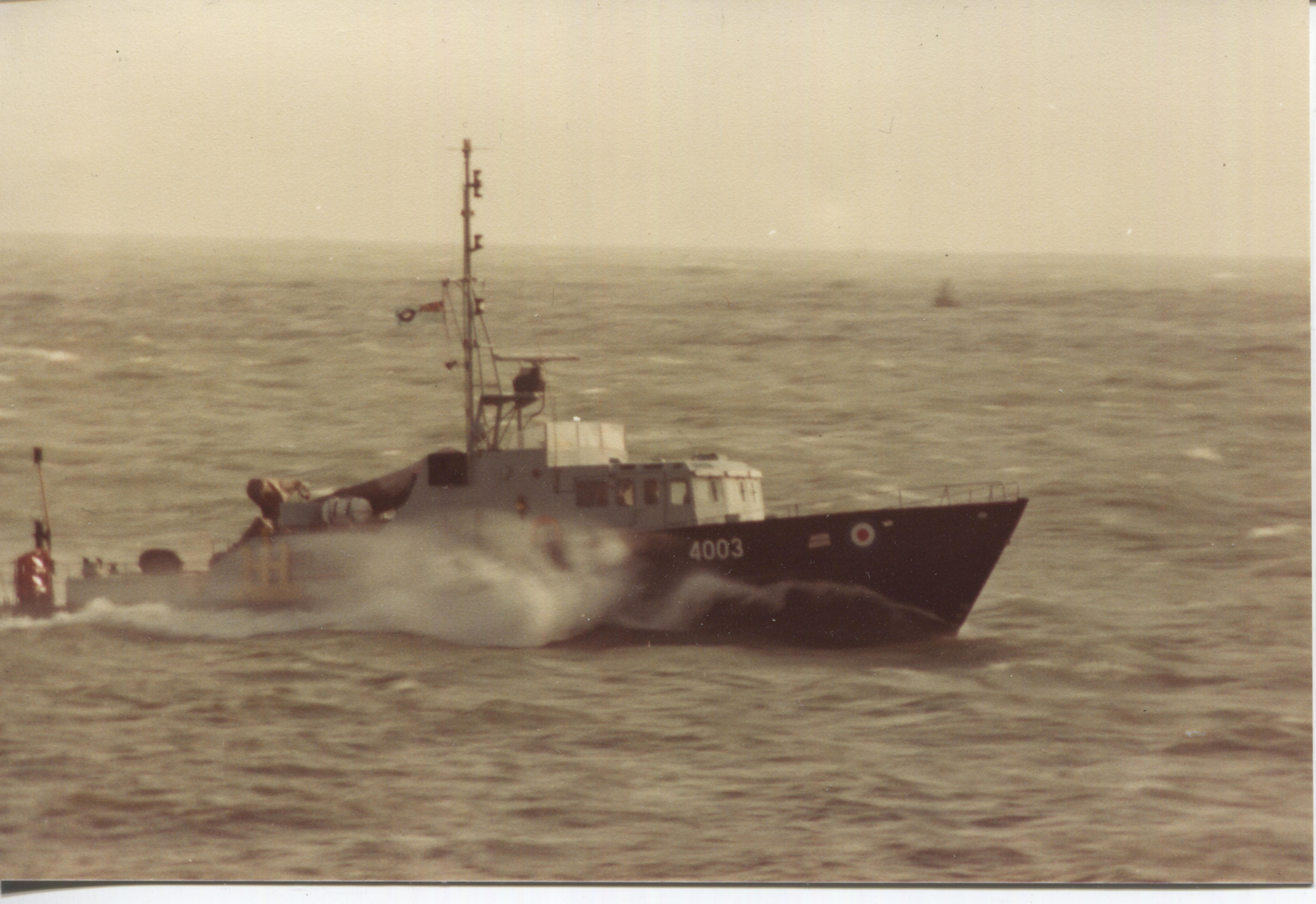
Rescue & Target Towing Launch Mk.3 4003 - Halifax

The last roles for the MCS craft were as guard ships and target tugs for the training of the maritime anti-shipping squadrons of the RAF, and its vessels were designated Rescue & Target Towing Launches (RTTL) to reflect this. In 1986, the Marine Branch was disbanded, the last of the RAF's vessels retired and handed over to civilian contractors for the target towing role. In the rescue role, they were replaced either by helicopters, or by the RNLI, where necessary.

== Actions and engagements ==
In addition to being available for rescue operations on at ready basis, the MCS was tasked with providing a rescue capability for specific operations, including clandestine ones.

- Operation Dynamo
- Battle of Britain
- Dieppe Raid
- Operation Overlord
- Operation Market Garden
- Reoccupation of Akyab, Burma

== Boats and ships ==
RAF Marine Craft Section ships
| Name | Role | Length | Displacement | Cruising speed | Top speed | Range | Built | Builder | Notes |
|---|---|---|---|---|---|---|---|---|---|
| MV Dumana | Seaplane depot ship | 464 ft (141 m) | 8,428 GRT | | 13.5 knots (25.0 km/h; 15.5 mph) | | 1923 | Barclay Curle | Chartered in 1939 for use as a base and maintenance ship in the Mediterranean. While in convoy between Freetown and Lagos, torpedoed and sunk in 1943 by German submarine |
| HMAFV Adastral | Seaplane depot ship | | | | | | | | ex HMS Fife Ness, a Beachy Head-class repair ship, on conversion served as HMAVFS Adastral 1947-1953 |
| HMAFV Bridport | Long Range Rescue Craft | 162 ft (49 m) | 605 tons | | 16 knots (30 km/h; 18 mph) | | 1940 | William Denny and Brothers | J50 ex Royal Navy Bangor-class minesweeper handed over 1946 |
| HMAFV Bridlngton | Long Range Rescue Craft | 162 feet | 605 tons | | 16 knots | | 1940 | William Denny and Brothers | J65 ex Royal Navy Bangor-class minesweeper handed over 1946 |
| RAFV Seal | Seal-class Long Range Recovery and Support Craft | 120 ft (37 m) | 158 tons full load | 17 knots (31 km/h; 20 mph) | 25 knots (46 km/h; 29 mph) | 950 mi (1,530 km) at 20 kn (37 km/h; 23 mph), 2,200 mi (3,500 km) at 12 kn (22 km/h; 14 mph) | 1967 | Brooke Marine | Was to have been the lead ship of a class of ten, curtailed after three were built. |
| RAFV Seagull | Seal-class Long Range Recovery and Support Craft | 120 feet | 158 tons full load | 17 knots | 25 knots | 950 miles at 20 knots, 2,200 miles at 12 knots. | 1969 | Fairmile | |
| RAFV Sea Otter | Seal-class Long Range Recovery and Support Craft | 120 feet | 158 tons full load | 17 knots | 25 knots | 950 miles at 20 knots 2,200 miles at 12 knots. | 1970 | Fairmile | Transferred to Royal Navy as HMS Redpole |

RAF Marine Craft Section boats
| Class/Name | Designation | Number | Length | Displacement | Cruising speed | Top speed | Range | Year(s) built | Builder | Notes |
|---|---|---|---|---|---|---|---|---|---|---|
| ST-200 Mk1 | Seaplane Tender | 104 | 37.5 ft (11.4 m) | 4.5 tons | 24 knots | 29 knots | 140 miles at 24 knots | 1931 | British Power Boat Company | Some converted into fire floats(fireboats) |
| HSL100 Type 1 | High Speed Launch | 22 | 64 ft (20 m) | 19 tons | | 35 knots | 500 miles | 1936 | British Power Boat Company | First of the RAF HSLs, in light of combat experience, contract for further craft cancelled in favour of the Type 2 |
| HSL100 Type 2 | High Speed Launch | 69 | 63 ft (19 m) | 21.5 tons | | 39 Knots | | 1940-1942 | British Power Boat Company | Popularly known as the "Whaleback" |
| Canadian Power Boat Company 70 ft HSL | High Speed Launch | 11 | 70 ft (21 m) | | | 42 knots | | 1941 | Canadian Power Boat Company | Canadian subsidiary of the BPBC, building related designs |
| British Power Boat 41 1/2 ft ST | Seaplane Tender | 67 | 41 ft 6 in (12.65 m) | | | 23 knots | | 1941-4 | British Power Boat Company | Used as a general purpose utility craft |
| Groves and Gutteridge | General Service Pinnace | 200 | 60 ft (18 m) | | | 13-17 knots | | 1941-4 | Groves & Gutteridge | Designed to replace 56 foot Admiralty type, top speed depended on which engines were fitted, either 3x102hp or 3x130hp engines |
| Thorneycroft Whaleback | Whaleback High Speed Launch | 105 | 67 ft (20 m) | | | 25-26 knots | | 1942-45 | John I. Thornycroft & Company | |
| HSL Type Three 68 ft "Hants and Dorset" | High Speed Launch | 91 | 68 ft (21 m) | | | 28 knots | | 1942-5 | British Power Boat Company | So called because of the large superstructure which was likened to a bus from Hants & Dorset Motor Services, the local bus company. Became the cornerstone of the post-war ASRUs when other HSLs were demobilised. |
| Miami | High Speed Launch | 39 | 63 ft (19 m) | | | 33 knots | | | Miami Shipbuilding Company | Supplied under Lend-Lease mostly deployed in the Mediterranean, around Africa and the Red Sea |
| Vosper 73 ft HSL | High Speed Launch | 15 | 73 ft (22 m) | | | 27 knots | | 1942 | Vosper & Company | Based on the hull of the Fairmile D, acquired for operation in the Western approaches and farther out to sea, better seakeeping than other HSLs but considered slow by crews used to the whalebacks. |
| Fairmile 115 ft LRRC | Long Range Rescue Craft | 40 | 115 ft (35 m) | | | 33 knots | | 1943-4 | Fairmile Marine | based on the hull of the Fairmile D motor torpedo boat, acquired for operation in Far East |
| 43 foot RSL | Range Safety Launch | 27 | 43 ft (13 m) | 12 tons | | 20 knots | 200 miles | 1953-56 | various | |
| RTTL Mk II | Rescue & Target Towing Launch | | 68 ft (21 m) | 34 tons | | | | 1956 | Vosper | |

== See also ==
- Interservice rivalry
- RAF Bridlington
- RAF Regiment
- List of ships of the United States Air Force
- Pinnace No. 1386 sinking
- The Sea Shall Not Have Them
- For Those in Peril (1944 film)

== Bibliography ==
- Robinson, Richard (1989). "Question 18/87". Warship International. XXVI (3): 310–311. ISSN 0043-0374.
- Smythe, A. J. & Caruana, Joseph (1988). "Question 18/87". Warship International. XXV (3): 315. ISSN 0043-0374.
