= Aero-engined =

The term aero-engined refers to a vehicle other than an aircraft that is powered by an aircraft engine:

- Aero-engined boat (such as Miss England I and Miss Britain III)
- Aero-engined car
- Aero-engined train (including turbojet trains such as the M-497 Black Beetle)
