= Crash rescue boat =

Type of rescue boat

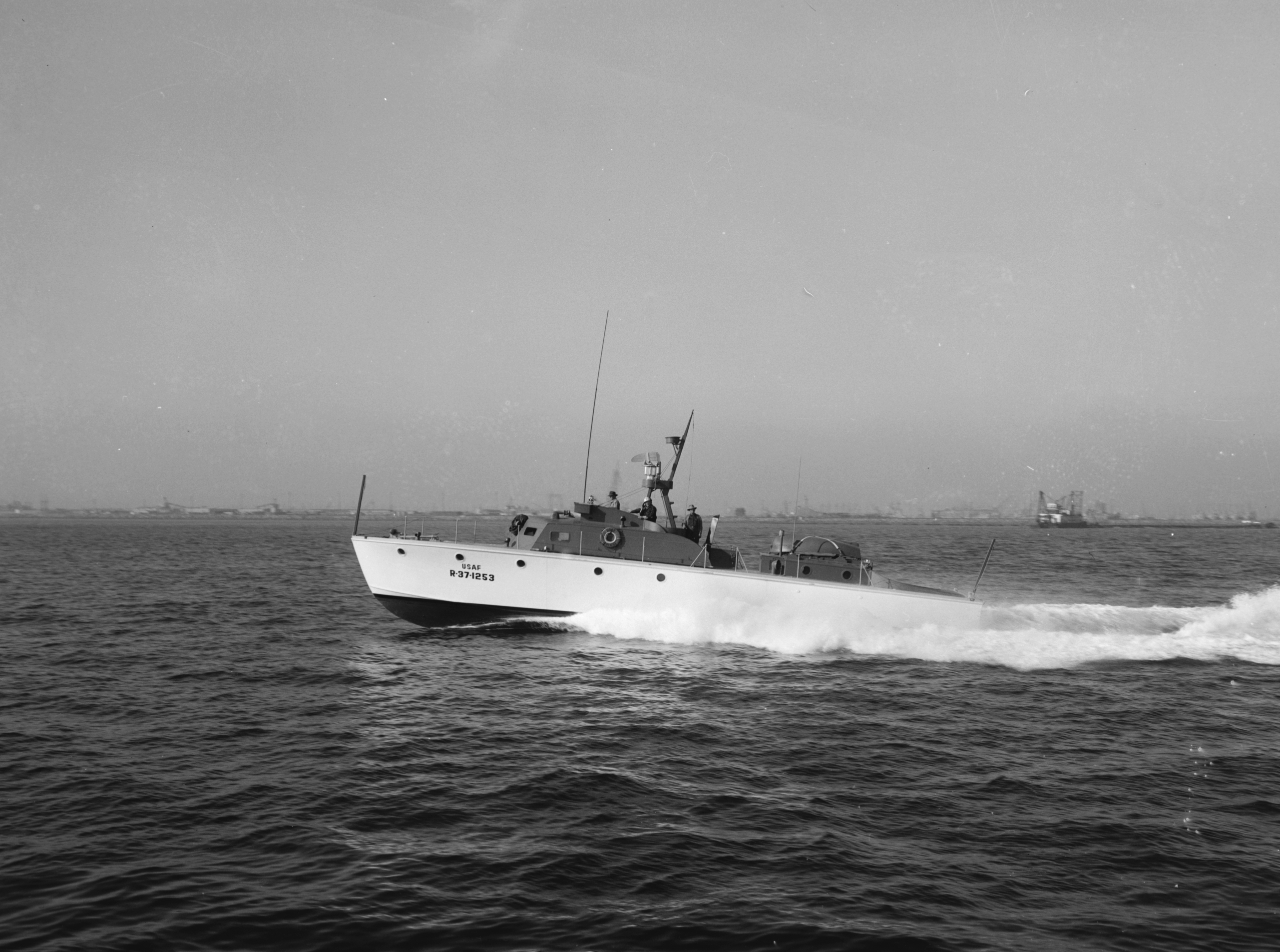
- A U.S. Air Force 63-foot (19.20 m) Mark II crash rescue boat in peacetime trim
- Active: 1950–1953

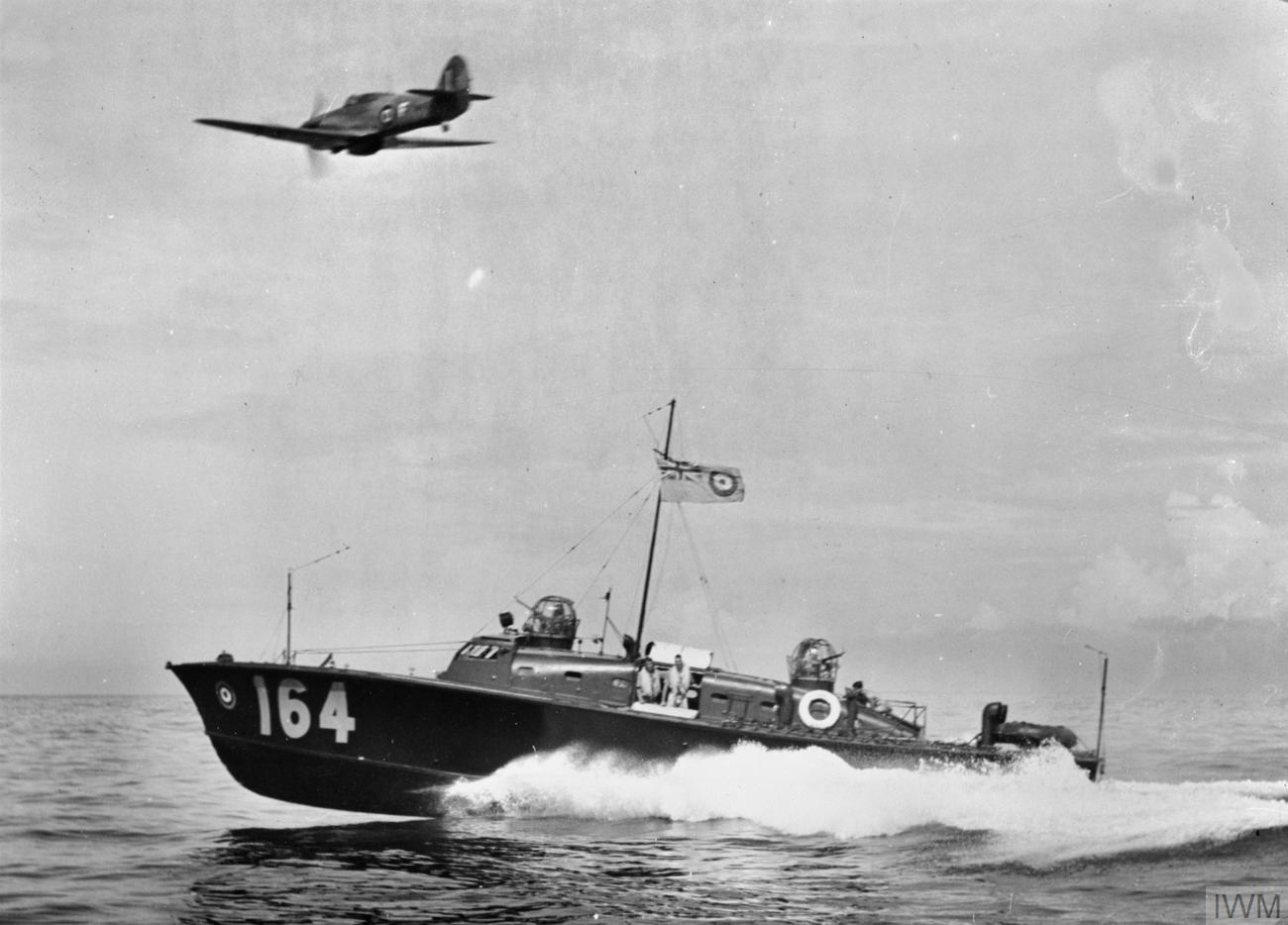
Royal Air Force Whaleback HSL 164 off Colombo with a Hawker Hurricane overhead

Crash Rescue Boat is a name used in the United States to describe military high-speed offshore rescue boats, similar in size and performance to motor torpedo boats, used to rescue pilots and aircrews of crashed aircraft. During World War II these rescue boats, armed with light anti-aircraft guns for self-defense, saw extensive service with the British Royal Air Force (RAF) and United States Army Air Forces (USAAF).

== United Kingdom ==
From its inception in 1918 the RAF had seaplane tenders, which as part of Marine Craft Section were used for rescue, but these were really only designed for refueling and rearming the seaplanes in service with the RAF. Development of a purpose-built boat for rescue began in 1932 with the 200-class seaplane tenders, followed by the 100-class ASR (Air-Sea Rescue) boats which entered service in 1940. Perhaps the best-known 100-class boat was the 36-knot (67 km/h) British Power Boat Company Type Two 63 ft HSL, also known as the 'Whaleback' after its distinctive design.

Even after the introduction of rescue helicopters such as the Westland Dragonfly in 1953 the RAF continued to operate a fleet of Rescue/Target Towing Launches, the last of which was not retired until 1986.

== United States ==
The USAAF used 140 crash rescue boats, 85-foot (26 m) long, in World War II, designed by Dair N. Long in 1944. The last of these boats has been restored by the AAF/USAF Crash Rescue Boat Association, a non-profit organization with the goal of preserving it for future generations. It is now owned by the Louisville Naval Museum Inc as-of September 2020. These boats were also used during the Korean War, but were superseded by other boats and by PBY Catalina flying boats and other aircraft such as the 1946 purpose-built Sikorsky H-5 helicopter, designated as the H03S by the United States Navy. The 22nd Crash Rescue Boat Squadron not only rescued pilots during the Korean War, but also conducted covert operations behind enemy lines. A few 63-foot boats were built post World War II, noted as Mark 2, 3, and 3 models.

Around the 1960s, Captain Ed Berlin operated Claire II, a re-purposed Herreshoff Manufacturing 63-foot (19 m) crash rescue boat, on the Bronx River in the Bronx, New York.

For the 1962 movie PT-109, several 82-foot (25 m) USAF crash rescue boats were converted to resemble 80-foot PT Elcos when the few surviving PT boats were found to need too much work to make them seaworthy for use during the film.

The US operated many crash rescue boats during World War 2.

== See also ==
- Seenotdienst (World War II Luftwaffe organisation that operated fast motor life boats)
- PT boat
- Motor launch
- For Those in Peril – 1944 British film that is based on the RAF air-sea rescue service featuring Type Two craft.
- The Sea Shall Not Have Them
