= Type Two 63 ft HSL =

High-speed launch boat

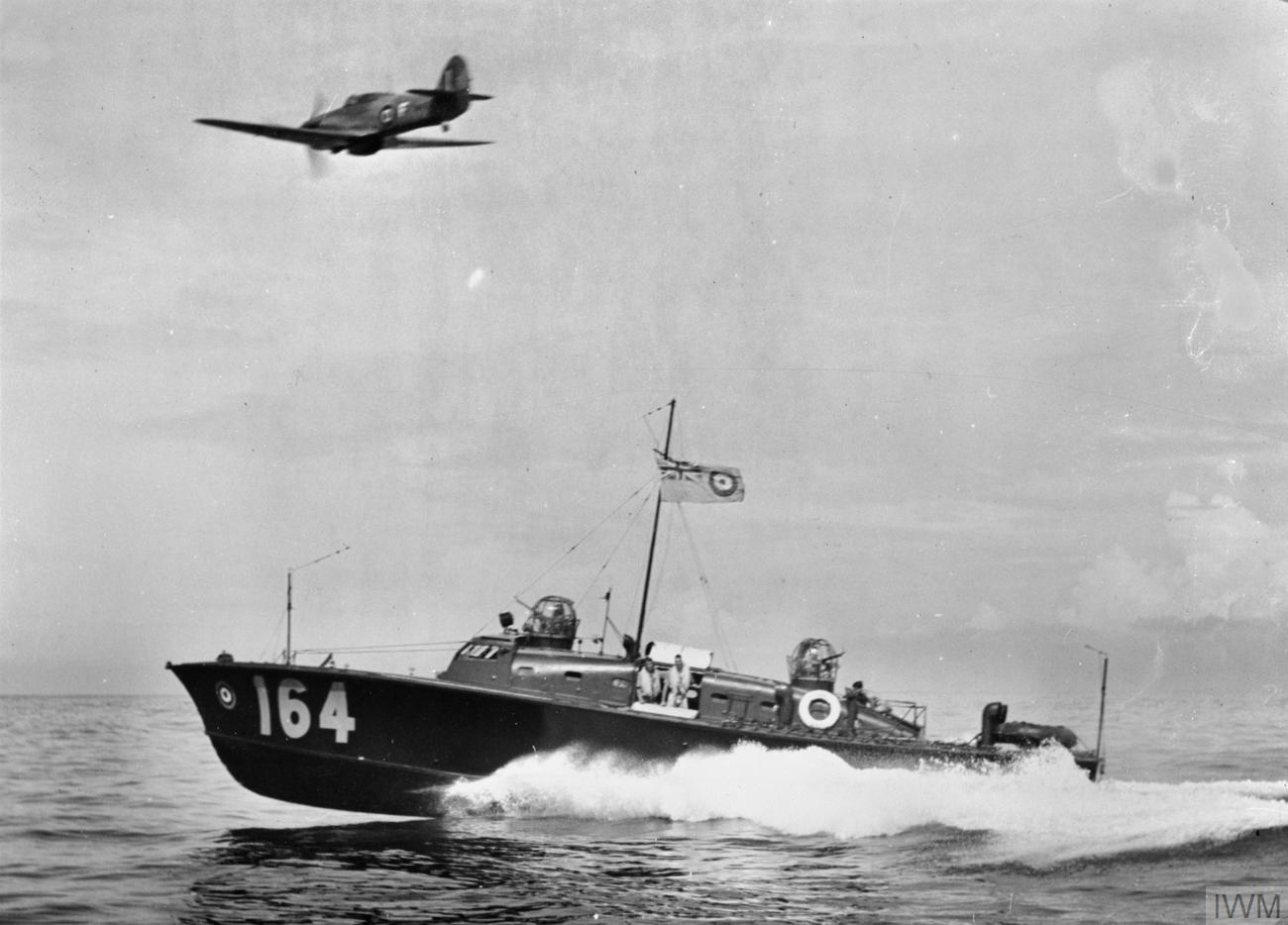
- Whaleback HSL 164 off Colombo with a Hawker Hurricane overhead

Class overview
- Name: Type Two 63 ft HSL
- Builders: British Power Boats
- Operators: RAF Marine Craft Section, UK

General characteristics
- Type: High speed launch
- Displacement: 21.5 tons
- Length: 63 ft (19.20 m)
- Beam: 17 ft 6 in (5.33 m)
- Draught: 3 ft 9 in (1.14 m)
- Propulsion: 3 × Napier Sea Lion each of 500 hp (370 kW)
- Speed: 36 kn (67 km/h)
- Range: 500 miles (800 km)
- Complement: 9 (including captain and a medical orderly)
- Armament: originally 2 × 0.303 machine guns, later 2 × 0.303 machine guns in single turrets, 2 × twin 0.303 machine guns, 1 × Oerlikon 20 mm cannon

The Type Two HSL was a 63-foot high-speed launch craft made by British Power Boat Company (BPBC). The craft were used during the Second World War for air-sea rescue operations to save Allied aircrew from the sea. The Type Two superseded the 64 ft HSL, and was itself replaced by the Type Three 68 ft "Hants and Dorset" also built by the BPBC. The Type Two (a.k.a. Type 2) was nicknamed the "Whaleback" due to the distinctive curve to its deck and humped cabin.

== History ==
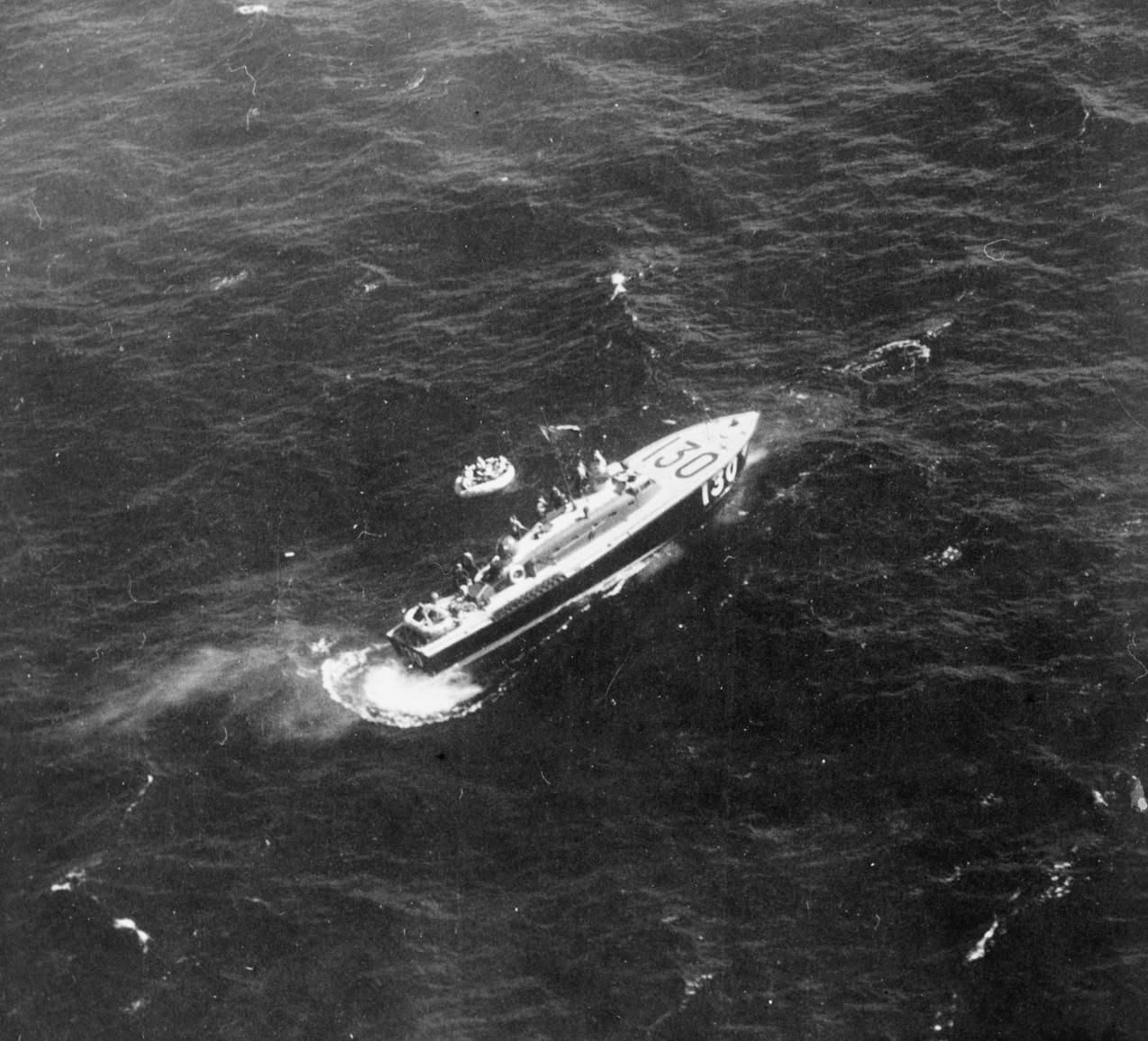
HSL 130 picking up an RAF Halifax crew off the Isle of Wight, 1942

The Type Two was designed in 1937 by George Selman, Chief Designer and Naval Architect of the British Power Boat Company, which was founded by Hubert Scott-Paine at Hythe. Scott-Paine had previously owned the Supermarine Aviation Company, later builders of the Supermarine Spitfire and several flying boat types.

A low-set cabin contained the wheel-house, chart room and a sickbay. For defence against enemy aircraft, on top of the cabin were two aircraft-style turrets made by Armstrong-Whitworth initially with a single .303 in Vickers K gun or Lewis gun (later improved to paired guns of the same calibre). The mahogany hull was of the hard chine, planing type.

== Usage ==
During the Second World War, the retrieval of pilots and aircrew who had been shot down over, or who had had to ditch in, the sea around the British Isles was the responsibility of the Royal Air Force Marine Branch, (motto: "The sea shall not have them"). Rescue of downed aircrew was coordinated using RAF aircraft, aircraft operated by Coastal Command and the Royal Navy and rescue launches operated by the RAF Marine Branch and the Royal Navy.

The Type Two was supplied to RAF marine craft units from the middle of 1940. In total, 69 craft were manufactured between 1940 and 1942.

After World War II, a number of the Type Two craft were transferred to the Royal Navy and a small number were given to the Italian Air Force. The vast majority of the Type Two craft belonging to the Admiralty were subsequently stored and later sold off as houseboats. None are currently owned by any museum or trusts.

== Variants ==
Following their performance during the Dieppe raid in August 1942, the Type Two was modified. Extra armament was fitted – paired .303 in machine guns mounted either side of the wheel-house and a single 20 mm Oerlikon on the (strengthened) rear deck. Protection was improved by adding anti-shrapnel padding around the forward cabin area.

== See also ==
- Crash boats of World War 2
- Crash rescue boat
- For Those in Peril – 1944 British propaganda film that is based on the RAF air-sea rescue service featuring Type Two craft.
- Motor launch
- The Sea Shall Not Have Them
- Wooden boats of World War 2
