= Motor torpedo boat =

Type of fast torpedo boat

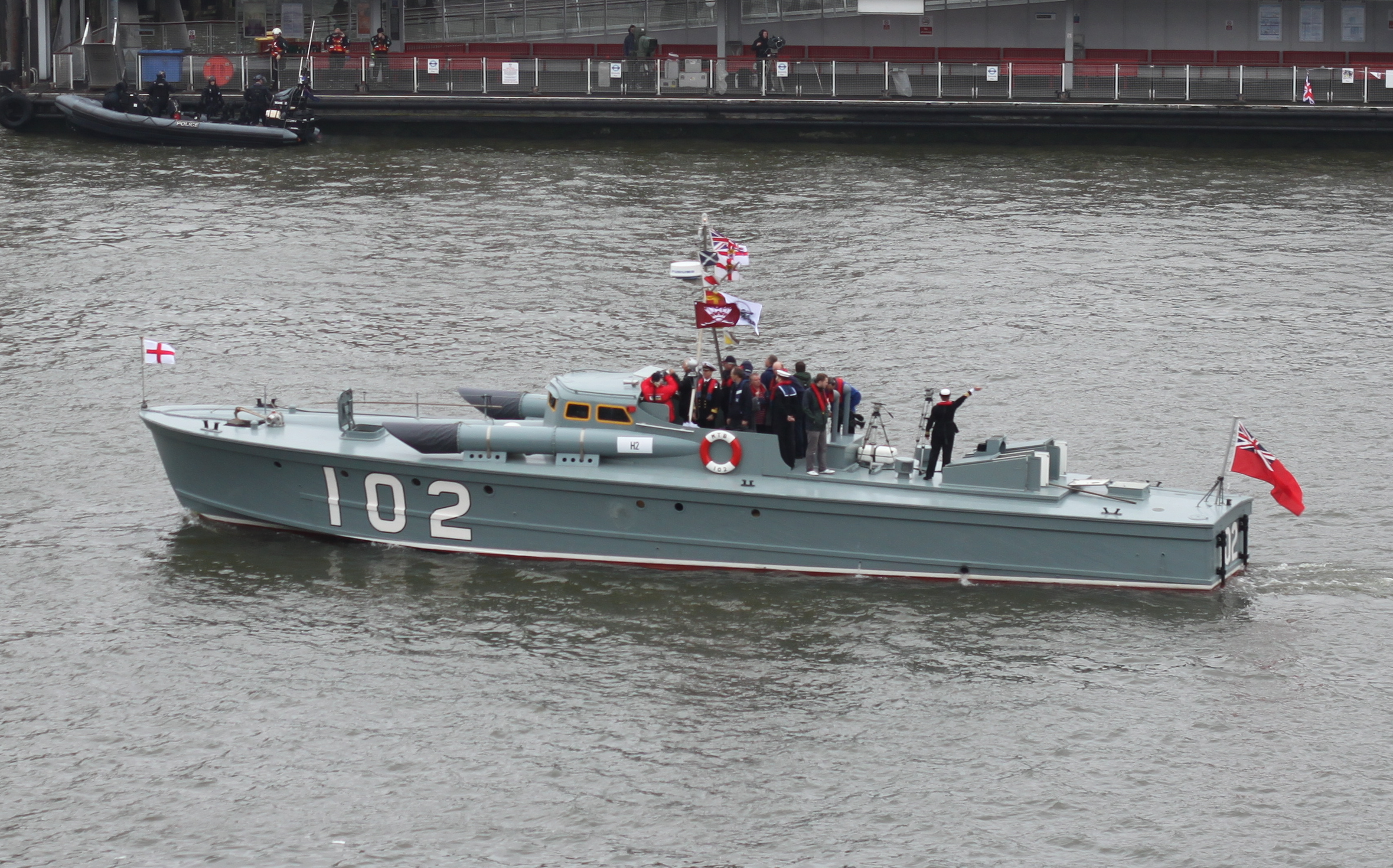
MTB 102, an experimental design, served in World War II. During the Dunkirk evacuation it acted as a temporary flagship

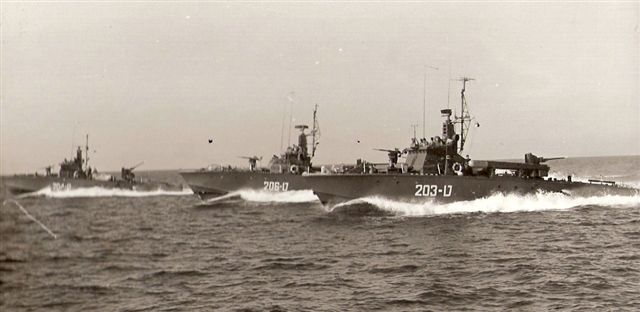
Israeli MTB formation, c. 1967

A motor torpedo boat is a fast torpedo boat, especially of the mid 20th century. The motor in the designation originally referred to their use of petrol engines, typically marinised aircraft engines or their derivatives, which distinguished them from other naval craft of the era, including other torpedo boats, that used steam turbines or reciprocating steam engines. Later, diesel-powered torpedo boats appeared, in turn or retroactively referred to as "motor torpedo boats" for their internal combustion engines, as distinct from steam powered reciprocating or turbine propulsion.

Though other navies built similar petrol-powered craft, the specific designation "motor torpedo boat", abbreviated to "MTB", is generally used for craft of the Royal Navy (RN) and Royal Canadian Navy boats.

During the Second World War, the US Navy built several classes of marine V-12-powered PT boat, whose hull classification symbol "PT" stood for "patrol, torpedo", but which were grouped into motor torpedo boat squadrons. German diesel-powered torpedo boats of the Second World War were called S-boote (Schnellboote, "fast boats") by the Kriegsmarine and "E-boats" by the Allies. These large craft (well over 100 ft overall) were not known as motor torpedo boats at the time, but later have been grouped with them by some. Italian MTBs of this period were known as Motoscafo Armato Silurante ("MAS", torpedo-armed motorboats). French MTBs were known as vedettes lance torpilles ("torpedo-launching fast boats").

The role of the motor torpedo boat has been absorbed in modern navies by the fast attack craft.

== History ==
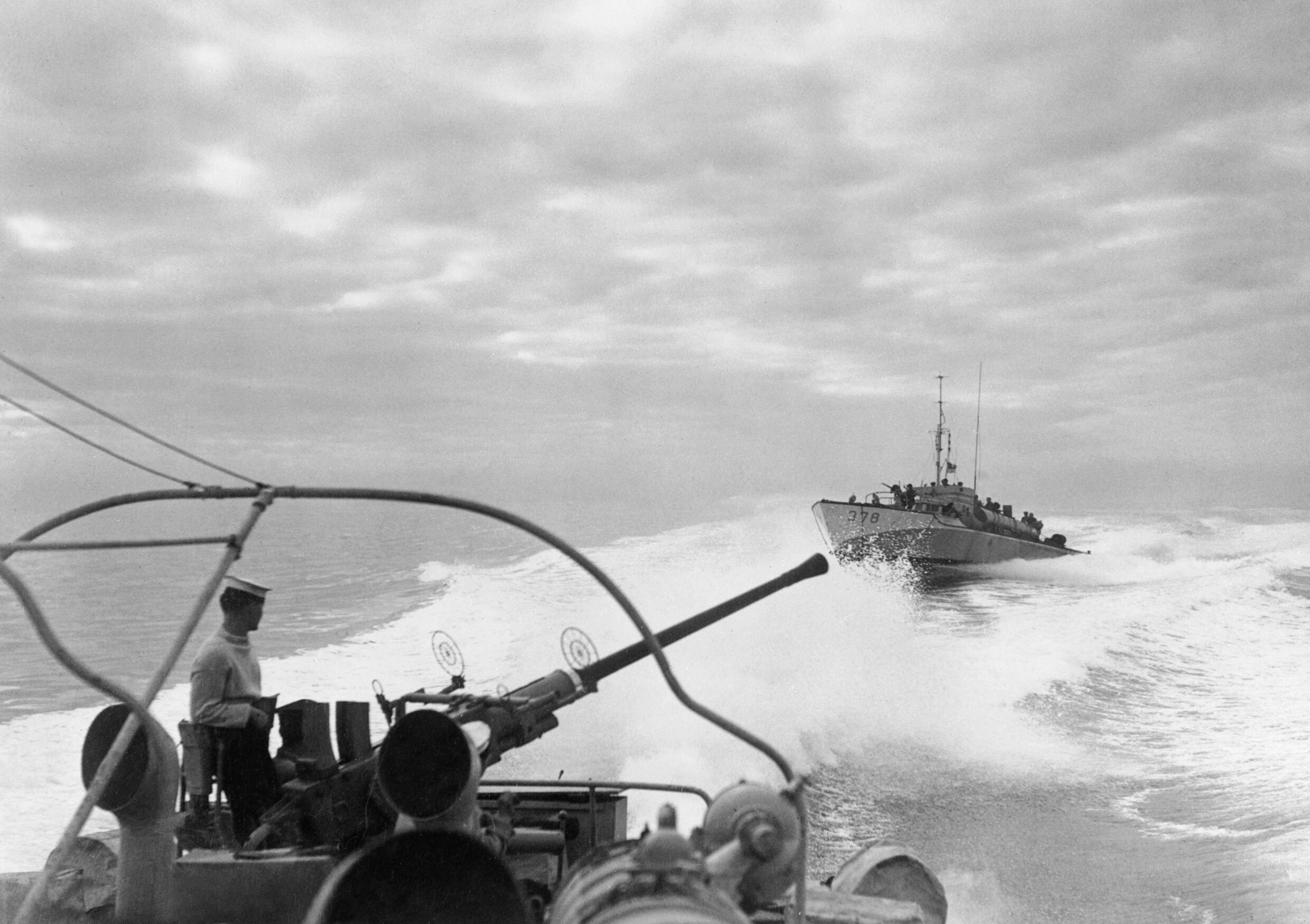
MTBs in the Mediterranean, February 1945

Torpedo boats were designed for missions that variously involved high speed, operating at night, low speed ambush, and manoeuvrability to allow them to get close enough to launch their torpedoes at enemy vessels. With no significant armour, the boats relied upon surprise and agility at high speed to avoid being hit by gunfire from bigger ships.

The Royal Navy started developing particularly small, agile, and fast petrol-powered torpedo boats in the early 20th century, shortly before the beginning of the First World War. Known as coastal motor boats, these were only around 15 long tons (15 t). They were joined by the Italian Navy's MAS boats, of 20–30 long tons (20–30 t) displacement. MAS 15 was the only motor torpedo boat in history to sink a battleship, the Austro-Hungarian vessel Szent István in 1918. In the Second World War, Britain fielded a variety of motor launches (MLs), motor torpedo boats (MTBs), motor gunboats (MGBs) and motor anti-submarine boats (MASBs), which were operated by Coastal Forces. A similar size boat with a different role in the Second World War was the BPB 63 ft (19 m) high-speed launch used by the RAF for air-sea rescue operations. Diesel-powered MTBs entered the Royal Navy with the Dark-class and Gay-class fast patrol boats in 1954. The last MTBs in the Royal Navy were the two Brave-class fast patrol boats of 1958, which were capable of 50 knots (93 km/h).

== Specifications ==
Many boats were designated MTBs. A variety of designs were adopted and built. For instance, a 55 ft (17 m) type, capable of 40 kn (46 mph; 74 km/h), was shown in 1930.

=== British MTBs ===
The following is an incomplete list of British motor torpedo boats:

==== Vosper "private venture boat" ====
Commander Peter Du Cane CBE, the managing director of Vosper Ltd, designed a motor torpedo boat as a private venture in 1936. She was completed and launched in 1937. The vessel was bought by the Admiralty and taken into service with the Royal Navy as MTB 102.

- Length: 68 ft (21 m)
- Beam: 19 ft 9 in (6.02 m)
- Draft: 3 ft 9 in (1.14 m),

The installed powerplant of three Isotta Fraschini Asso V-18 57-litre petrol engines delivered 3,300 hp (2,500 kW) which gave her a speed of 48 kn (55 mph; 89 km/h) light and 43 kn (49 mph; 80 km/h) when carrying a full load.

- Crew: 2 officers, 10 men.

Armament was two 21 in (533 mm) torpedo tubes; depth charges, machine guns and 20mm Oerlikon were trialled on her.

MTB 102 was the fastest wartime British naval vessel in service. She was at Dunkirk in 1940 for the evacuation of British and French troops, where she served as Rear-Admiral Frederic Wake-Walker's flagship after the destroyer HMS Keith was sunk. She carried Winston Churchill and Dwight Eisenhower when they reviewed the fleet before the Invasion of Normandy in 1944.

==== British Power Boat 60 ft MTB ====
These were based on the British Power Boat Company Type Two 63 ft HSL (high-speed launch) originally designed for the Royal Air Force for air-sea rescue but reduced to 60 ft (18 m) in length. They could carry two 18-inch (457 mm) torpedoes and achieve a maximum speed of 33 kn (38 mph; 61 km/h). The Royal Navy ordered their first (of a total of 18) in 1936. These entered service as MTB numbers 1 to 12 and 14 to 19. In the early days of the war, they were painted with different numbers and photos distributed to the press to give the impression the Royal Navy had more than they actually did. One photo was sent to the American monthly Popular Science showing the number twenty-three.

==== British Power Boat 72 ft MTB ====
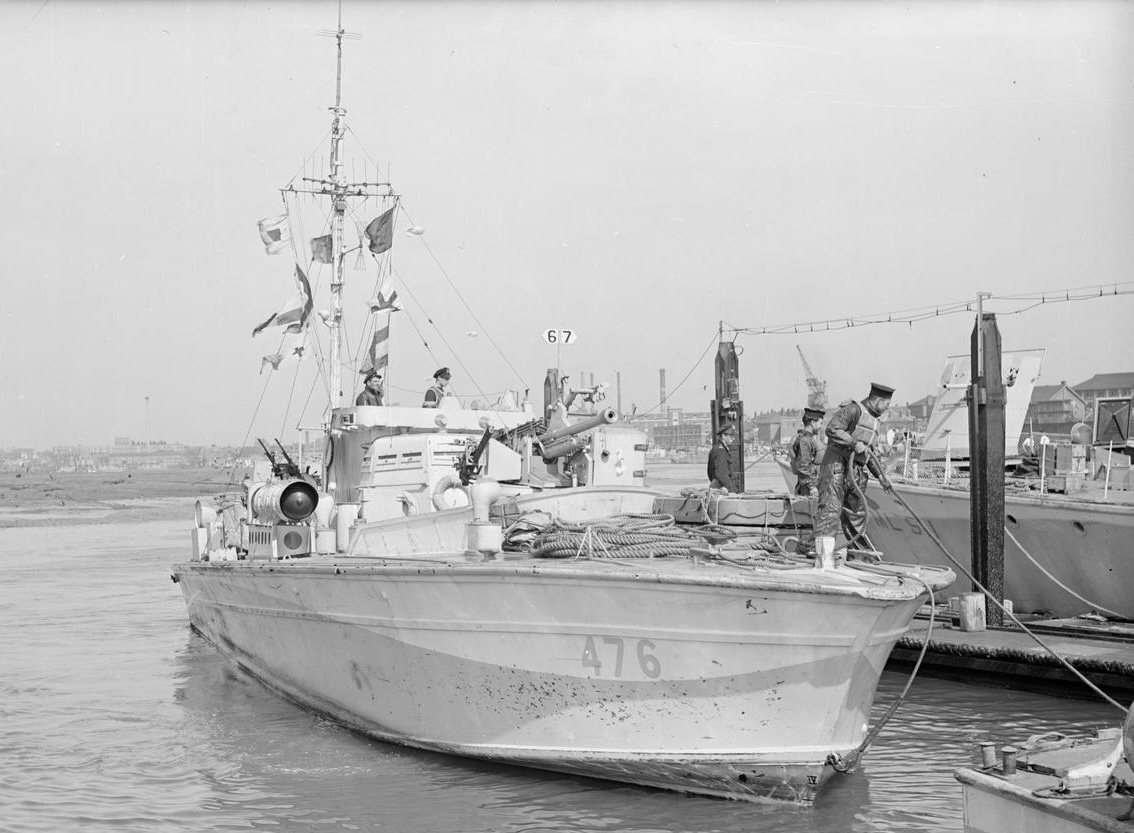
British Power Boat 72 ft MTB 476 tied up at the Coastal Forces base st Haslar on 15 August 1944

Initially ordered as an MGB in 1941; they were converted to MTBs from 1942 by addition of two 18-inch tubes and a 6-pdr gun. Although 10 tons heavier after conversion they still made 39 knots. MGB 115–130 were redesignated as MTB 434–449 and MGB 131–170 were completed as MTB 450–489. In 1943 MTB 490–509 were ordered.

==== Vosper 45 ft MTB ====
Built as a private venture, the 45-ft MTBs were scaled down versions of larger Vosper designs and intended to be carried by larger vessels. As MTB 104 to 107, these were taken up by Admiralty but found to have poor seakeeping and not used for combat.

MTB 105 was carried aboard the Special Service Vessel HMS Fidelity after her conversion to a Commando carrier for service in the Far East with T Company, 40 Commando. Fidelity was torpedoed and sunk with great loss of life as part of Convoy ON 154. The eight crew of MTB 105, along with two from one of Fidelity's floatplanes were the only survivors from the sinking.

==== Vosper 70 ft MTB ====
Although various boat lengths were produced by Vosper for the Royal Navy, the "70 ft" boat was produced from 1940. The design was produced with modifications as MTBs 31-40, 57–66, 73−98, 222−245 and 347−362.

Using three Packard V1-12 marine engines, they were capable of around 37 kn (43 mph; 69 km/h). Early models carried two 21-inch (533 mm) torpedo tubes, twin 0.50 in (13 mm) machine guns in a "bin" behind the bridge and two 0.303 in (7.7 mm) machine guns. They could also carry four depth charges.

The Vosper 70 was also used in other navies, such as Romania's, which acquired three in 1939, with NMS Viscolul the lead ship of the class.

==== Vosper 73 ft (Type I and Type II) ====
Between 1943 and 1945, the "Vosper 73ft" design appeared; this was a flush-decked type with a slight sheer forward, dispensing entirely with the low forecastle and scalloping of the majority of '70-footer' types. The type II differed from the Type I in that it carried a heavier gun armament at the expense of two torpedo tubes. Boats produced to this design carried pennant numbers MTB 380-395 and MTB 523-537. The Type II did not enter service before the end of the war but was in use after the war.

Type I

- Length: 73 ft (22 m)
- Engine: 3 Packard 4M V12 engines for a total of 4,200 hp
- Speed: 40 knots (74 km/h)
- Range: 470 nmi (870 km) at 20 knots (37 km/h)
- Displacement: 47 t
- Armament:
  - Four 18-inch (457 mm) torpedo tubes
  - Oerlikon 20 mm cannon
  - Two 0.303 in Vickers K machine guns (optionally two Vickers .50 machine guns)
- Crew: 13

Type II

- Length 73 ft (22 m)
- Engine 4,200 hp
- Speed 40 knots (74 km/h)
- Range 480 nmi (890 km) at 20 knots (37 km/h)
- Displacement 49 t
- Armament
  - Two 18-inch (457 mm) torpedoes
  - 57mm QF 6-pdr Mark IIA gun on powered mounting
  - Twin 20mm Oerlikon aft
  - Two 0.303 Lewis Guns
- Crew 13

==== Thornycroft 75 ft MTB ====
The first two (MTB 24, 25) were actually 74 ft prototypes for the design ordered in 1938. Powered by three Isotta-Franschini engines they could reach 37 knots. The later ones, MTBs 49-56, had four Thornycroft RY12 engines but were too slow for operations.

==== J S White 75 ft MTB ====
A development of the Vosper designs, White had been building under sub-contract. After construction passed to Polish Navy as S5-S10. Armed with two 18-inch torpedoes, 6-pounder gun forward, twin 20mm Oerlikon aft and two twin .303 machine gun mountings.

==== Fairmile D MTB ====
The Fairmile D was a very large British MTB designed by Bill Holt and conceived by Fairmile Marine for the Royal Navy. Nicknamed "Dog Boats", they were designed to combat the known advantages of the German E-boats over previous British coastal craft designs. Larger than earlier MTB or motor gun boat (MGB) designs, the Fairmile D was driven by four Packard 12-cylinder 1250 horsepower supercharged petrol engines and could achieve 29 knots (54 km/h; 33 mph) at full load. The boat carried 5,200 gallons of 100 octane fuel for a range, at maximum continuous speed, of 506 nautical miles. Armament varied according to role but could include four 18-inch or two 21-inch torpedoes, 6-pounder and 2-pounder guns, Oerlikons, multiple machine guns and depth charges.

=== Canadian MTBs ===
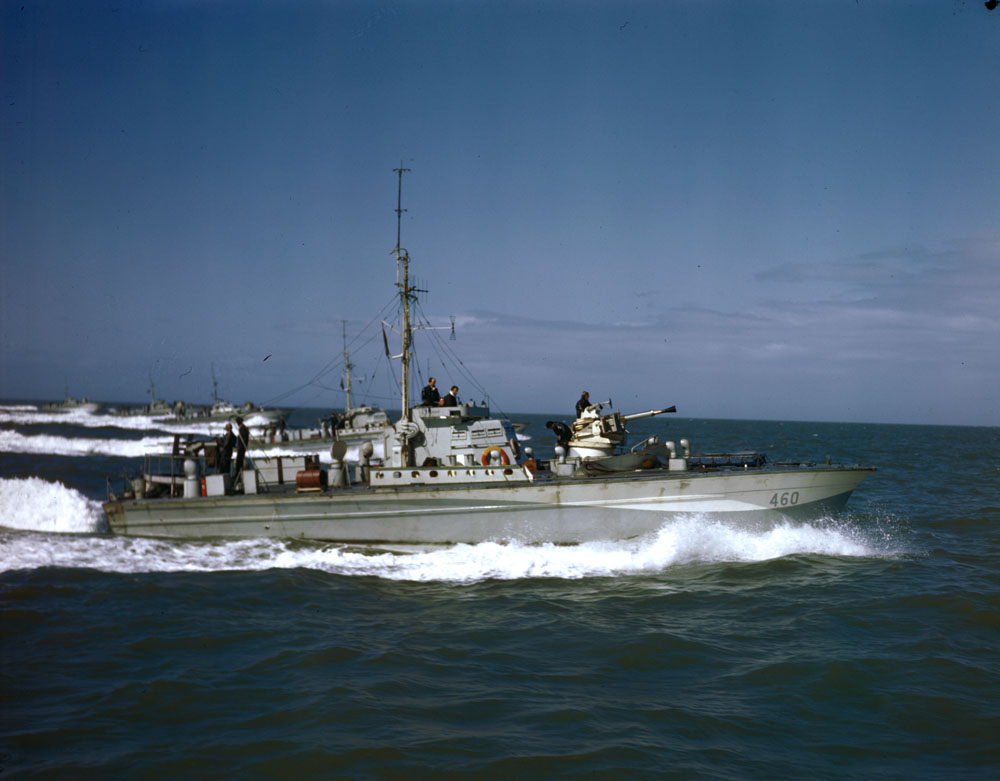
MTB-460 of the Royal Canadian Navy

These boats were designed by Hubert Scott-Paine for the Canadian Power Boat Company, and used by the Royal Canadian Navy 29th MTB Flotilla. Originally designed as motor gun boats (MGBs), carrying a 6-pounder (57mm, 2.24 inch) to engage enemy small craft, they were re-designated MTBs.

Scott-Paine type G 70 foot boat

- Manufacturer: British Power Boats, Hythe
- Displacement: 55 tons
- Overall length: 72 ft 6 inches (21 m)
- Breadth: 20 ft 7 inches (6.3 m)
- Draught: 5 ft 8 inches (1.7 m)
- Maximum speed: 38–41 kn (44–47 mph; 70–76 km/h) (new)
- Armament:
  - auto-loading QF 6-pounder (57mm, 2.24 inch) gun
  - Two 21-inch (533 mm) torpedo tubes (two torpedoes)
  - .303 or .50 Vickers machine guns
  - 20mm Oerlikon or 40 mm Bofors gun
- Powerplant – three Rolls-Royce or Packard 14M supercharged V-12 engines
  three shafts
- Power – 3,750 hp total
- Range – 140 nmi (260 km) radius of action at 25 kn (29 mph; 46 km/h)

== Post-war usage ==
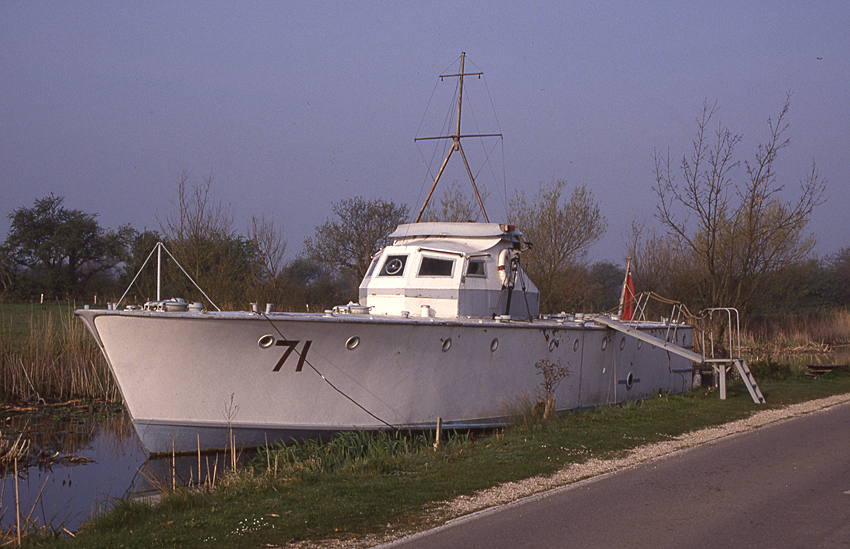
MTB 71 as a houseboat on the Chichester Canal

After the end of World War II a number of Royal Navy vessels were stripped and sold for use as houseboats. These included MGBs as well as MTBs. Many of these were moored in maritime locations such as Chichester Canal (MTB 71, now restored and on display at the Royal Naval Museum in Gosport), Langstone Harbour, Littlehampton, Hayling Island and Wootton Creek, although most have now disappeared from these locations. More MTB houseboats can be found at Shoreham-by-Sea (West Sussex), Cobden Bridge (Southampton) and Bembridge (Isle of Wight).

== See also ==
- Battle of Rumani Coast – battle involving MTBs in Israeli-Egyptian conflict
- Coastal Forces of the Royal Navy
- E-boat
- Fairmile D motor torpedo boat – British "dog boats"
- Fast attack craft
- HNoMS Nasty
- Motor gunboat
- Motor Launch
- Operation Agreement - operation involving MTBs in WWII
- Swift boat
- United States Nasty-class patrol boat
- Wooden boats of World War II
