= Miss England I =

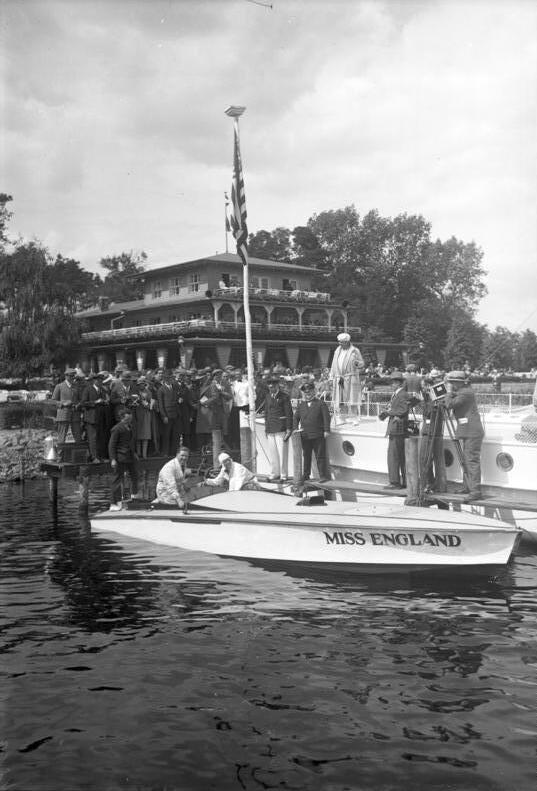
- Miss England I in 1929

History

United Kingdom
- Name: Miss England (I)
- Builder: Hubert Scott-Paine; British Power Boat Company; Hythe, Hampshire; Designer: Fred Cooper
- Launched: 1928
- Status: Museum exhibit

General characteristics
- Type: Racing motorboat with hard-chine planing hull
- Length: 27 ft 6 in (8.38 m)
- Beam: 7 ft 6 in (2.29 m)
- Installed power: 900 hp (670 kW)
- Propulsion: W12 Napier Lion VIIA aero engine; vee drive to single screw
- Crew: 2

Miss England I was the first of a series of speedboats used by Henry Segrave and Kaye Don to contest world water speed records in the 1920s and 1930s.

== Design and construction ==
Miss England was built for Henry Segrave in 1928, in an attempt to retrieve the Harmsworth Trophy from the American Gar Wood. Gar Wood's series of "Miss America" boats were using multiple high-powered aero-engines to establish an apparently unbeatable record. Segrave had already used multiple aero-engines in his land-speed record setting Sunbeam, but Miss England used a single Napier Lion engine and relied on an advanced planing hull design.

The hull was of an advanced lightweight construction, which some designers, including Gar Wood, regarded as too light and flexible. Wood made many sportsmanlike contributions to his competitor, particularly sharing his experience of propeller and rudder design – he wanted a close race with a worthy opponent.

== Racing career ==
Miss England raced successfully against Gar Wood's Miss America VII in Miami in 1929. It had been a successful trip for Segrave, having also taken the land speed record in Golden Arrow, and he was knighted on his return.

A record for single-engined boats of 91 mph (79 kn; 146 km/h) was established. The racing success though was due to Segrave's brave driving and some mechanical problems for Miss America. However Miss England was always outclassed by the far more powerful and faster American boats.

== Survival today ==
Miss England I survives to this day and is on display in the Science Museum, London

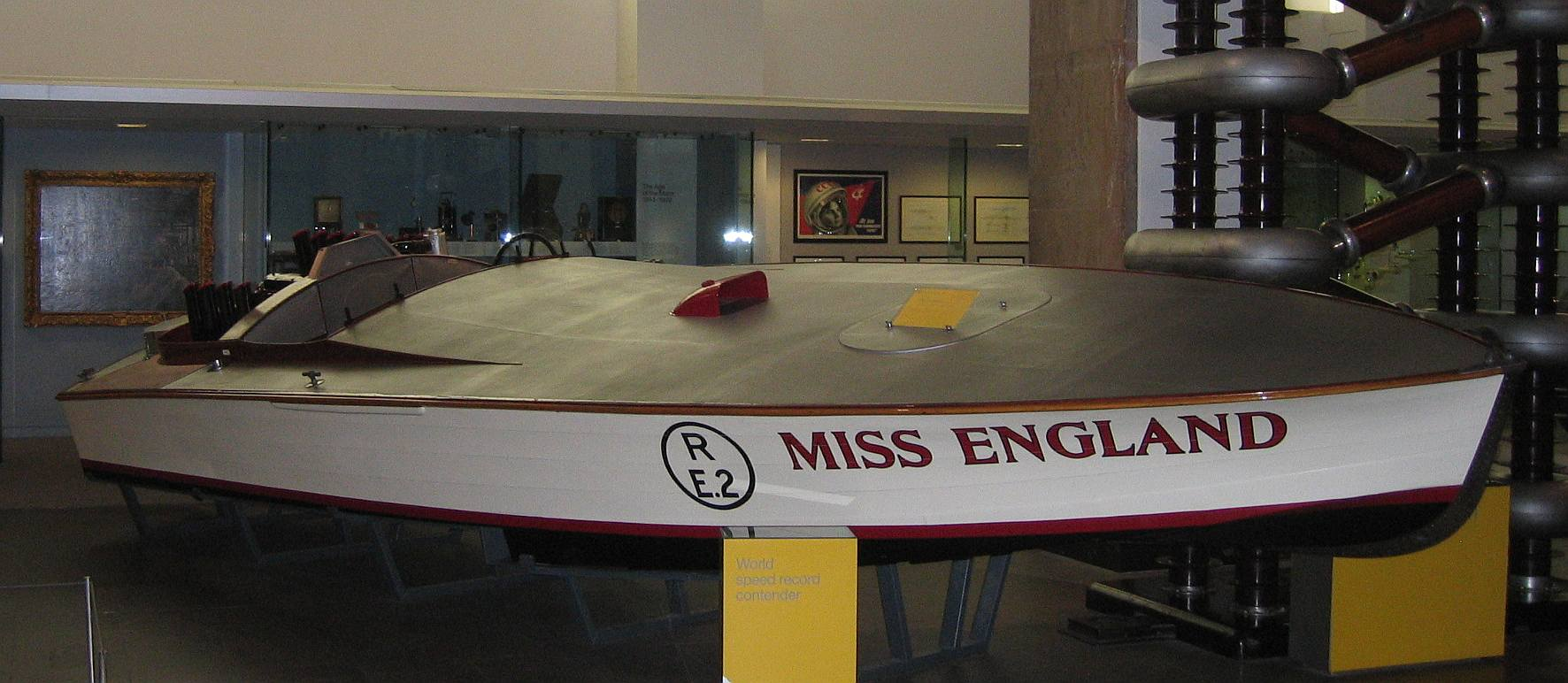
Side view

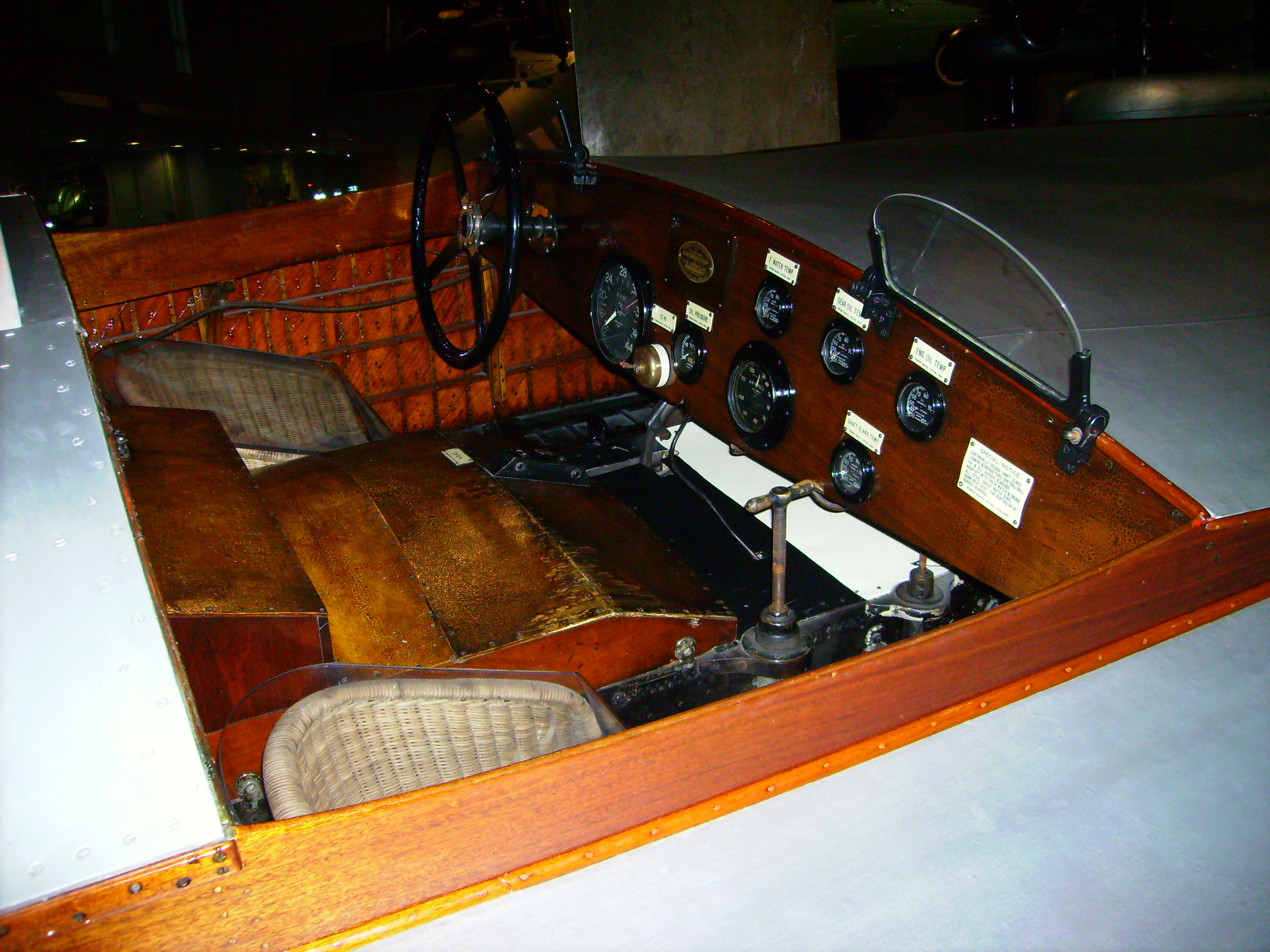
Cockpit

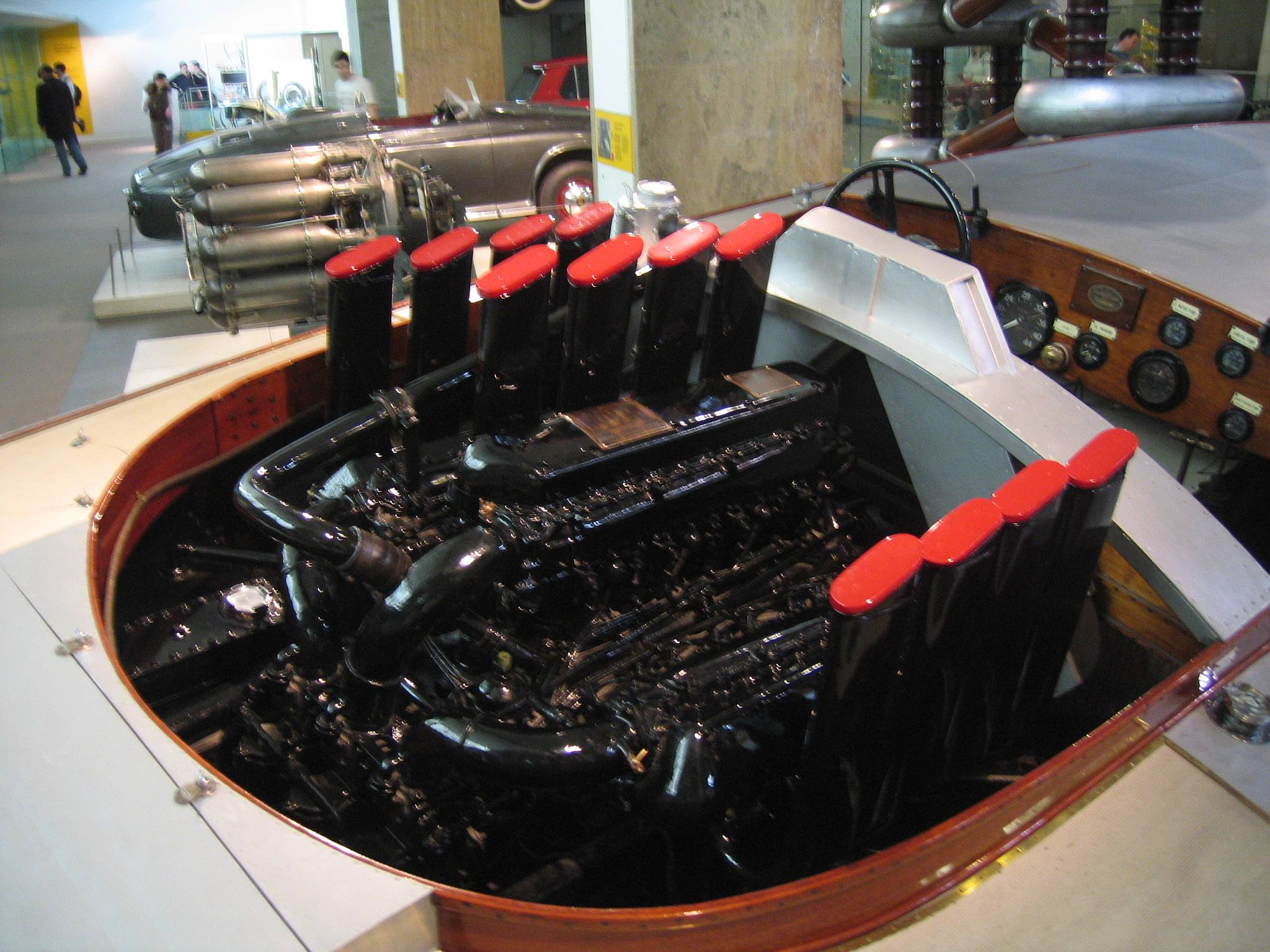
Napier Lion engine

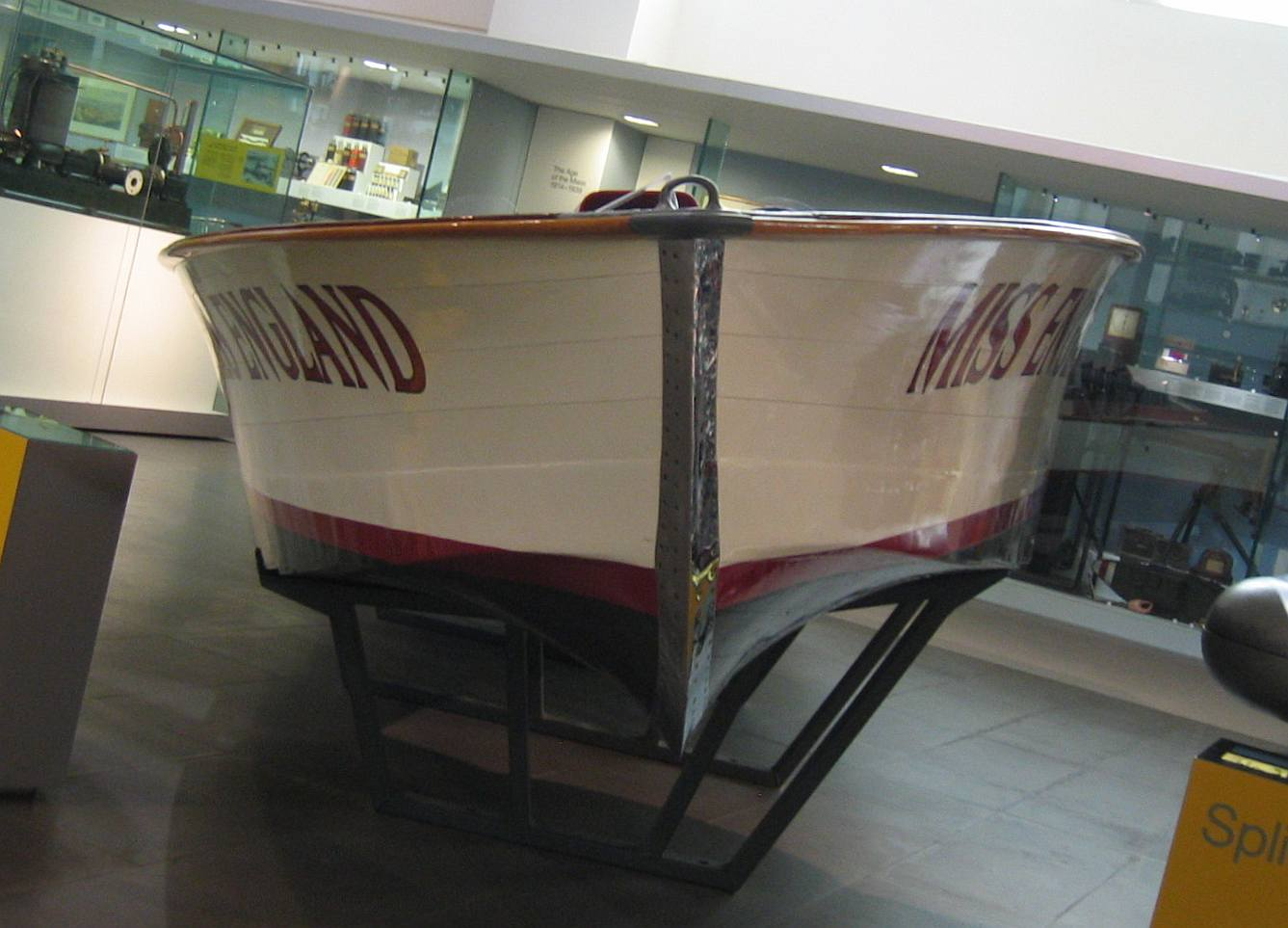
Bow-on view

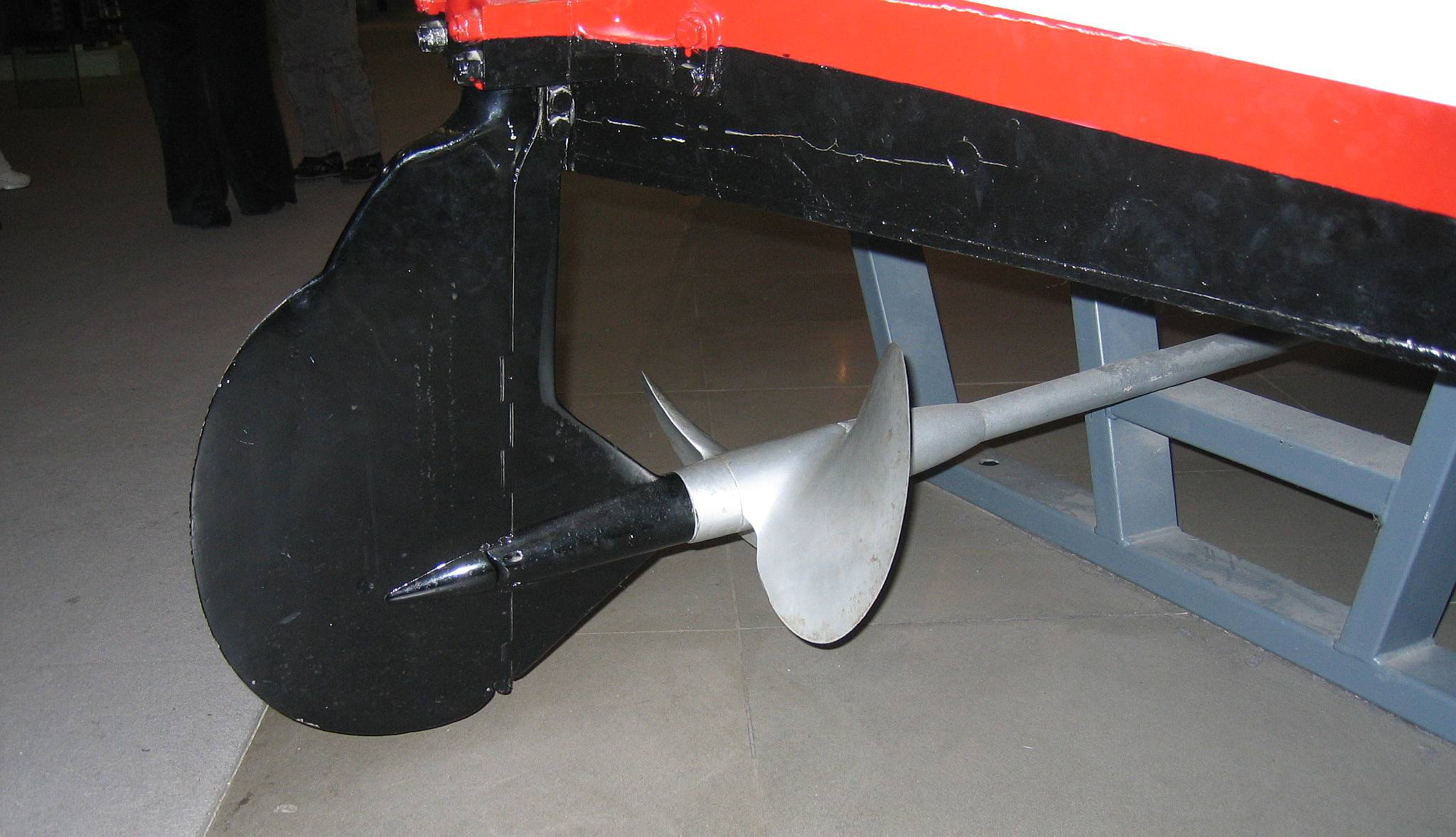
Propeller and rudder

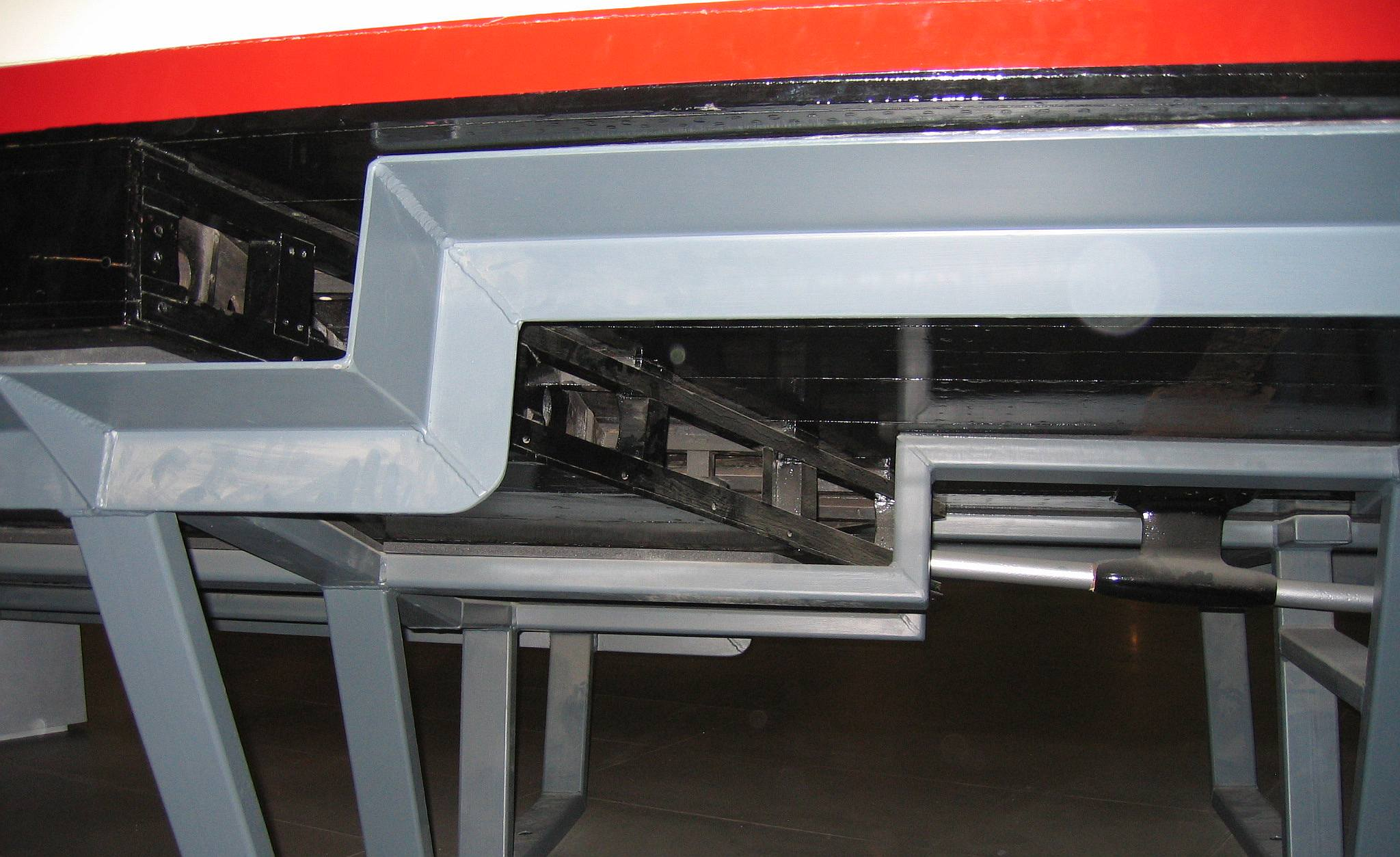
Under hull view showing the planing step

== See also ==
- Miss England (speedboat)
