= High-speed launch =

Military boat classification

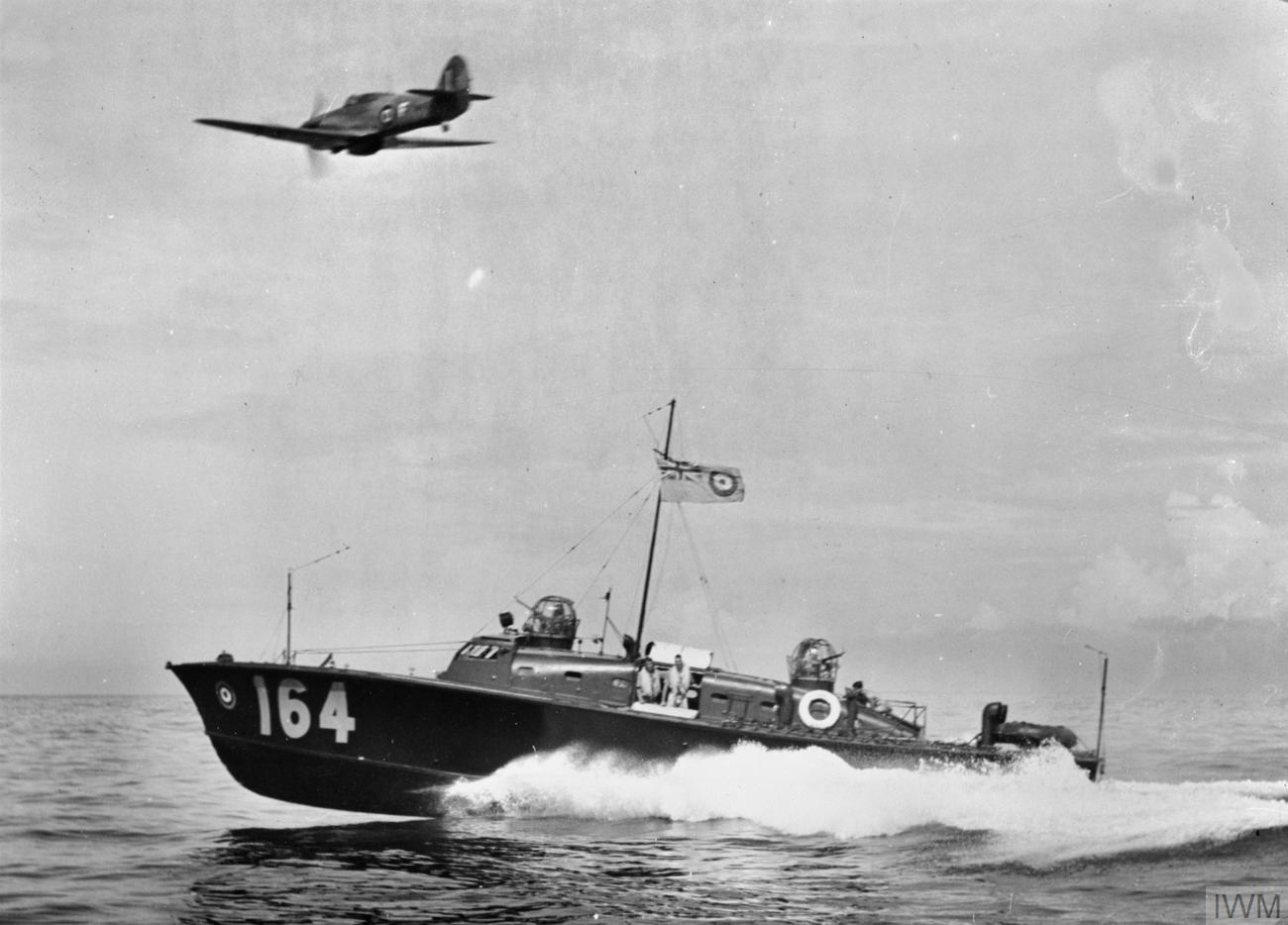
Whaleback HSL 164, a Type Two 63 ft HSL, off Colombo with a Hawker Hurricane overhead

A high-speed launch (HSL) is a type of military boat typically used for air-sea rescue operations. The British Royal Air Force (RAF) and others used HSLs especially during World War II.

The 64 ft. high-speed, air/sea rescue launch built by British Power Boat Company (BPBC) was one of the earliest high-speed offshore rescue vessel used by the RAF. The prototype, numbered 100, gave its name to the class as the "100 class"; High Speed Launch 102 is the only surviving boat from that class. It was tested in 1936 and production boats were delivered in 1937.

Later designs included the 1941 Type Two 63 ft HSL "Whaleback", an adaptation of a motor anti-submarine boat, the first HSL to include gun turrets. British Power Boat chief designer George Selman later designed the 68 ft. "Hants & Dorset"

By May 1944, The RAF had 130 HSLs.

== Bibliography ==
- Canwell, Diane; Sutherland, Jon (2013). RAF Air Sea Rescue 1918–1986. Pen & Sword Aviation. ISBN 978-1-84-884303-5.
- Pitchfork, Graham (2017). Shot Down and in the Drink: True Stories of RAF and Commonwealth Aircrews Saved from the Sea in WWII. London: Bloomsbury. ISBN 978-1-47-282725-8.
