= Canadian Power Boat Company =

Motor torpedo boat manufacturer

Canadian Power Boat Company was a manufacturer of motor torpedo boats and similar craft in Canada during World War II.

A prototype 12-metre (40 ft) boat was built by Hubert Scott-Paine's British Power Boat Company and shipped to Canada in 1940. Canadian Power Boat Company was set up by Scott-Paine to produce motor torpedo boats for the Royal Canadian Navy and high-speed launches for the Royal Canadian Air Force to this design. The company was located on the Lachine Canal in Montreal, next to the Crane Company (makers of the popular plumbing fixtures).

The company received orders from the Royal Canadian Navy for 12 motor torpedo boats, including the prototype, from the RCAF for 6 21-metre (70 ft) high-speed launches and 6 12-metre (40 ft) armoured target-towing boats, and from the Royal Netherlands Navy for two batches of 8 12-metre (40 ft) motor torpedo boats. The second Dutch order was the last received by the company and was completed in the summer of 1942. Four of these boats, were reverse Lend-Lease and became US PT 368-371

Of the 12 Royal Canadian Navy boats, only the prototype saw service in Canada, designated CMTB-1 before all twelve were transferred to the Royal Navy in 1941 for service in the Mediterranean.

Unable to persuade the Royal Canadian Navy to purchase more motor torpedo boats, the company retooled and spent the rest of the war using its factory (specialized for building plywood boats) to produce parts for de Havilland Mosquito bombers. Scott-Paine sold the company in 1946, the basin at the plant was filled in but the factory still stands today.

== Sources ==
- MacPherson, Ken and Ron Barrie, The Ships of Canada's Naval Forces 1910-2002, Third Edition. Vanwell Publishing, St. Cathrines, 2002. ISBN 1-55125-072-1
- Pritchard, James, A Bridge of Ships: Canadian Shipbuilding during the Second World War, McGill-Queens University Press, 2011. ISBN 978-0-7735-3824-5
- Rance, Adrian, Fast Boats and Flying Boats, (Ensign Publications, Southampton, England 1989) ISBN 1-85455-026-8
- Motor Boating, 1942
