= Miss England (speedboat) =

Miss England was the name applied to a series of speedboats used by Henry Segrave and Kaye Don to contest world water speed records in the 1920s and 1930s.

- Miss England I
- Miss England II
- Miss England III

== See also ==
- Miss Britain III
