= British Power Boat Company =

Former British motorboat manufacturer

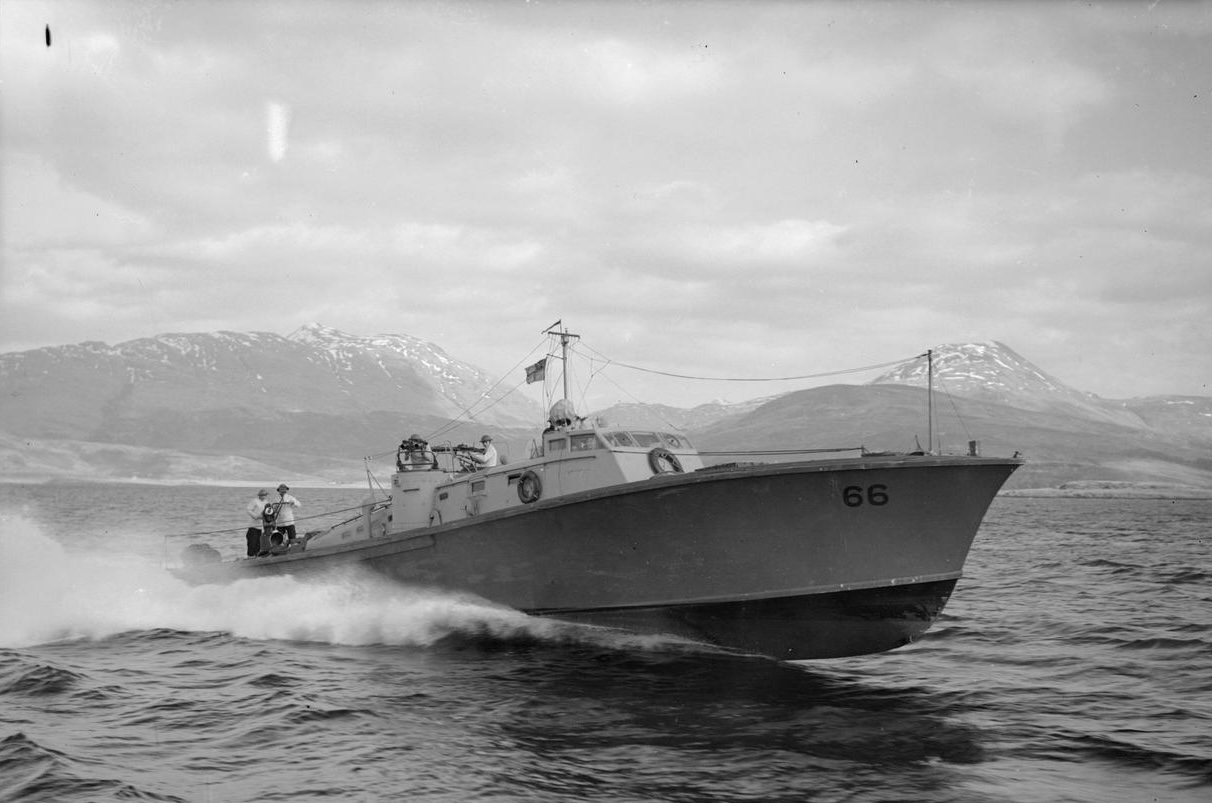
British Power Boat Motor Gun Boat MGB 66 at speed off the coast near Fort William, Scotland (1942)

The British Power Boat Company was a British manufacturer of motor boats from 1927 to 1946, particularly racing boats and later military patrol boats in Hythe, Hampshire.

== History ==
The company was formed on 30 September 1927 when Hubert Scott-Paine bought and renamed the Hythe Shipyard with the intention of transforming it into one of the most modern mass production boat building yards in the country. Together with his chief designer, Fred Cooper, the company produced the 26-foot single step hydroplane racing boat Miss England I. Fred Cooper later left, and Hubert Scott-Paine designed Miss Britain III.

From 1930 the British Power Boat Company supplied seaplane tenders to the Air Ministry, commencing with RAF200, a 37-footer. The trials of this and other boats was carried out by T. E. Shaw (T. E. Lawrence) on behalf of the Royal Air Force, and he and Scott-Paine worked together over the next few years. These tenders were powered by twin 100bhp Meadows petrol engines giving a maximum speed of 29 knots (some of the later ones were fitted with Perkins S6M diesels).

The company marketed its own modified Napier Sea Lion engines under the name "Power" Marine Engines.

On 3 August 1931 the factory burnt to the ground, but was rapidly rebuilt as the most modern and efficient boatyard in Britain. Motor torpedo boats with a hard chine were designed, built, and increasingly sold to the British Admiralty. Armoured target boats were also built for the RAF, proving very successful and cost-effective, together with tenders for Imperial Airways flying boats, and admirals' barges.

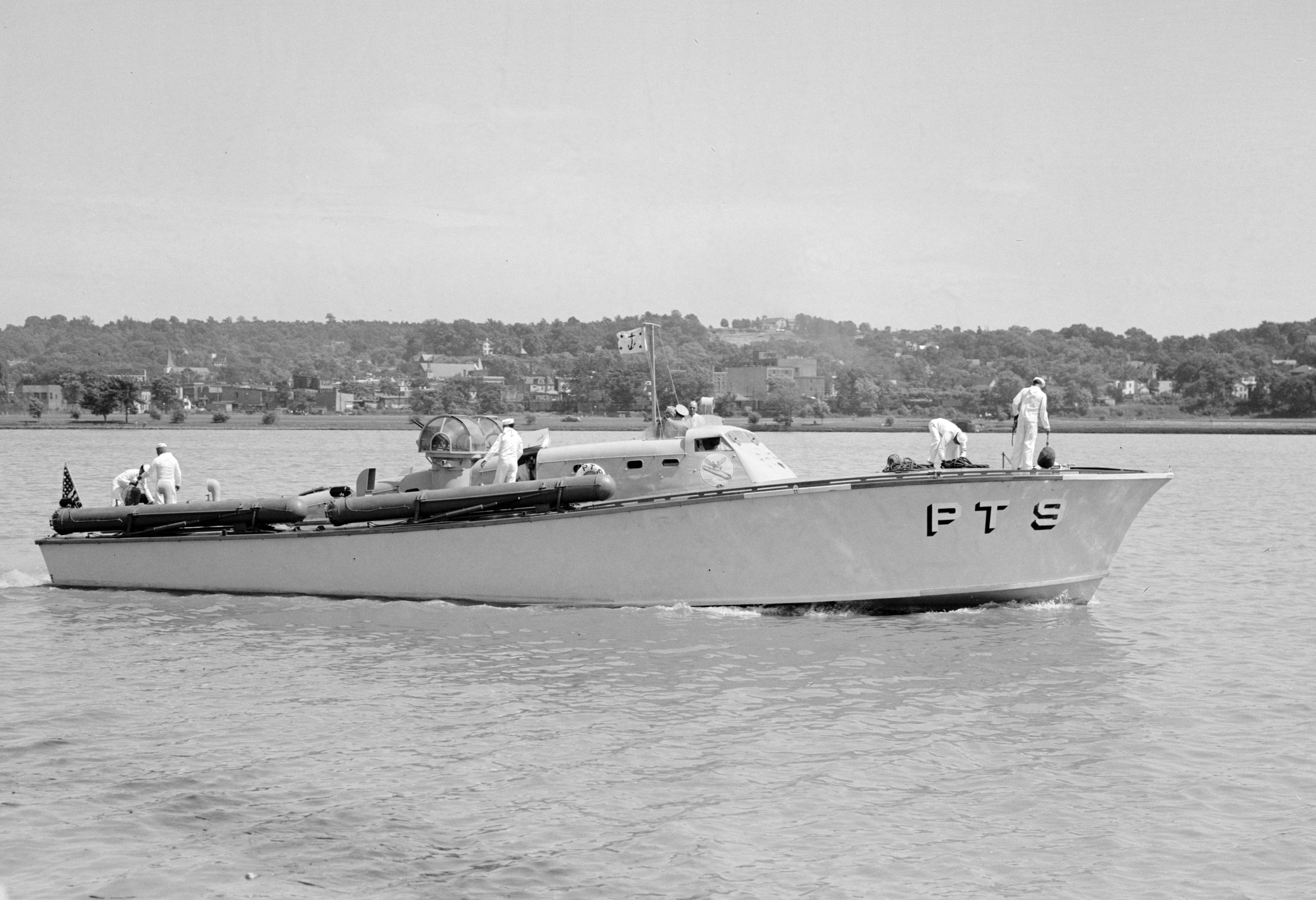
PT-9 at Washington D.C., 1940

In 1939, due to the difficulties in obtaining British engines, Scott-Paine took PT-9 to the US to enable Elco to mass-produce PT boats using Packard motors.

=== WWII: boats for the Navy and RAF ===
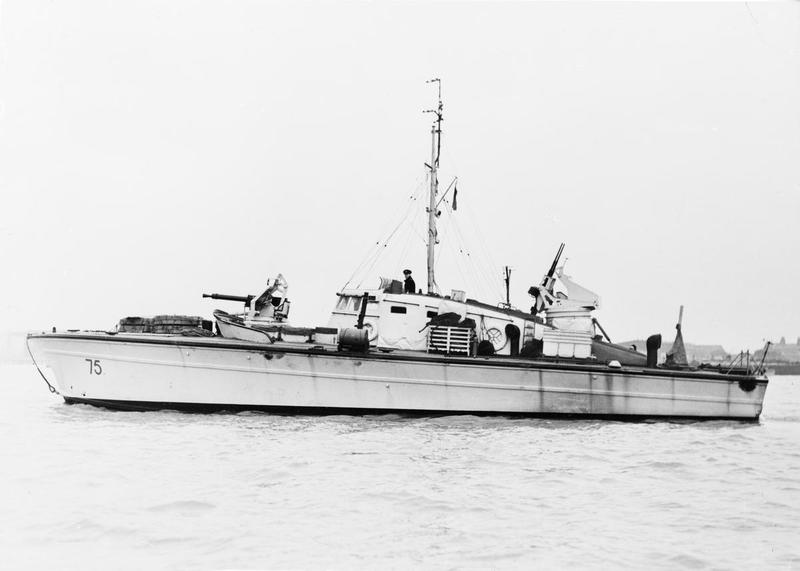
MGB 75, a British Power Boat Company motor gun boat at HMS Beehive, Felixstowe

During World War II the British Power Boat Company built large numbers of motor torpedo boats, high-speed motor launches, and motor gun boats (previously known as Motor Anti-Submarine Boats), being credited with saving the lives of over 13,000 service personnel.

One of their welders during WW2 was artist Sybil Andrews, who also made some paintings of the boats under construction.

All unfinished contracts were cancelled at the cessation of hostilities, and the British Power Boat Company closed in 1946.

== See also ==
- Fairmile Marine
- Vospers
- Electric Launch Company
- British Coastal Forces of World War II
