= Hubert Scott-Paine =

British aircraft and boat designer

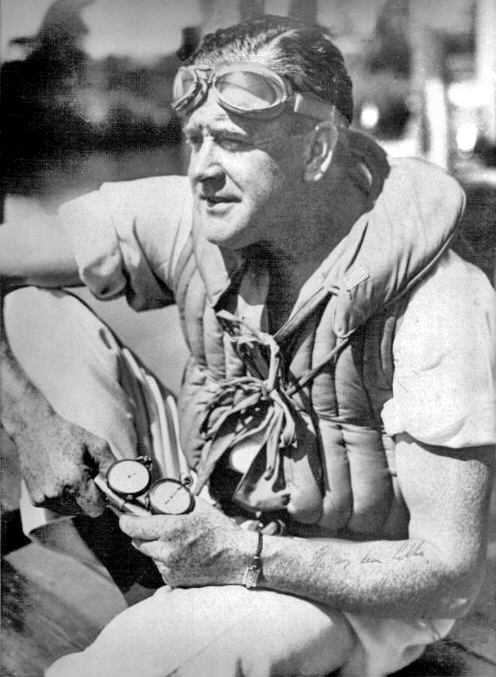
Hubert Scott-Paine 1891–1954

Hubert Scott-Paine (11 March 1891 – 14 April 1954) was a British aircraft and boat designer, record-breaking power boat racer, entrepreneur, inventor, and sponsor of the winning entry in the 1922 Schneider Trophy.

== Early life ==
Hubert Paine was born in Shoreham-by-Sea, England, on 11 March 1891, to Henry Paine and Rosannah (née Scott). He was educated at Shoreham Grammar School.

== Supermarine ==
Scott-Paine worked for Noel Pemberton Billing dealing in yachts, eventually in 1913 forming Pemberton-Billing Ltd (with 'Supermarine' as the telegraphic address), with Hubert the factory manager at Woolston, Hampshire.

In 1916 Scott-Paine bought the company and renamed it the Supermarine Aviation Company Limited, building flying boats for the British Admiralty. Reginald Mitchell (of Spitfire fame) was employed at this time and the company greatly expanded.

Hubert married Alice Brenda Hockey in 1917, having four children. By this time he had changed his surname by hyphenating his parents' surnames to create Scott-Paine.

== Channel Air Service ==
In February 1919 Scott-Paine started the first cross-channel flying boat service, between Woolston and the Channel Islands and Le Havre, using converted Supermarine AD Flying Boats. His company was named the British Marine Air Navigation Co Ltd.

== Schneider Trophy ==
After his failed 1919 attempt for the Jacques Schneider Trophy, Supermarine won the Trophy in 1922 with its Sea Lion II. This allowed Britain to win it outright years later.

== Imperial Airways ==
In 1923 Scott-Paine sold Supermarine (for £192,000). In 1924 Imperial Airways was formed by the merger of Scott-Paine's British Marine Air Navigation Co Ltd and three other airlines. He was a director of Imperial Airways until 1939.

== British Power Boat Company ==
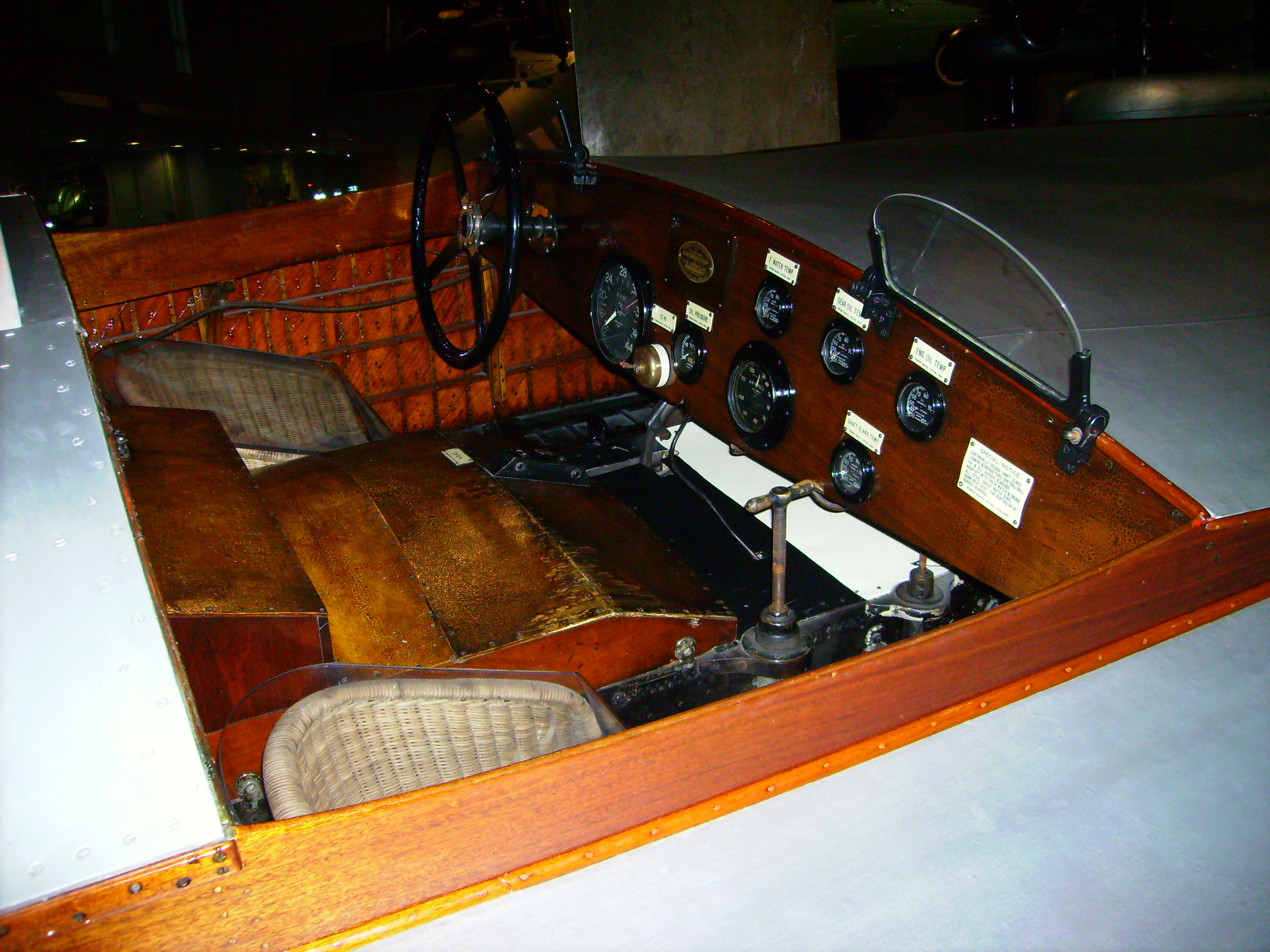
Cockpit of Miss England at the Science Museum in London

The well-financed Scott-Paine now designed and raced power boats. In 1927 he bought the Hythe Shipyard, renaming it the British Power Boat Company. It was enlarged into one of the country's most modern mass production boat building yards. Many sophisticated award-winning racing boats were produced, an example being Miss England which is now on display at the Science Museum (London).

In the 1930s the British Power Boat Company supplied seaplane tenders and armoured target boats to the Air Ministry, and tenders for Imperial Airways flying boats. T E Shaw (Lawrence of Arabia) assisted in the testing of these boats.

Although the factory was destroyed by fire in 1931, it was rapidly rebuilt and no contracts were lost.

== Miss Britain III ==
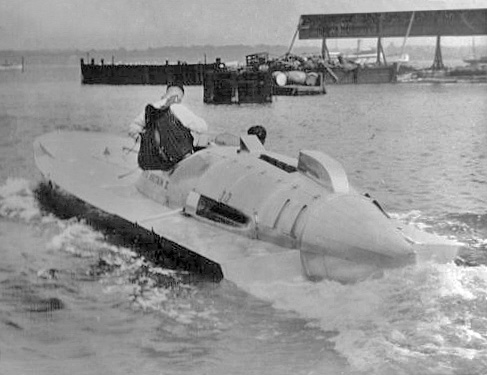
Hubert Scott-Paine testing Miss Britain III before the 1933 Harmsworth Trophy attempt

During 1932 and 1933 Scott-Paine and Fred Cooper designed and built the single-engined Miss Britain III as a Harmsworth Trophy challenger. In a 1933 race Scott-Paine was narrowly defeated by the crude four-engined Miss America X.

In 1934 Miss Britain III set the world record for a single-engined boat of 110.1 mph. Miss Britain III is now on display at the National Maritime Museum at Greenwich.

== Motor torpedo boats ==
From 1933 Scott-Paine designed and built hard chine motor torpedo boats, and MA/SB anti-submarine boats, from 1935 having them accepted by the Admiralty.

Scott-Paine and George Selman designed and built a new 70-foot (21 m) private venture PV70, a seagoing MTB with three marinised Rolls-Royce Merlin engines. The boat was launched in 1938, but although no orders came from the Admiralty, orders were received from friendly governments.

== PT boats ==
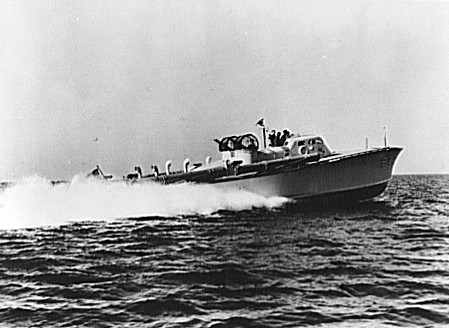
Elco 70-foot (21 m) PT boat PT-10 in 1941

In 1939 agreement was reached with the American Electric Launch Company (Elco) to purchase a British Power Boat 70-footer (later named PT-9), as a template for American production under licence. PT-9 was taken by the SS President Roosevelt to Elco’s works at New London, Connecticut. On 3 October Scott-Paine met President Roosevelt and senior Elco representatives at the White House to authorize the creation of a new naval arm, the PT Boat Squadrons. (PT boat was short for patrol torpedo boat). Production started at a new Elco factory at Bayonne, New Jersey in January 1940.

The Canadian Power Boat Company was set up by Scott-Paine in 1940. This produced 39 boats, mainly MTBs.

After the passing of Lend-Lease in 1941 comparative trials, nicknamed the Plywood Derbys, were held between rival American boatbuilders, Elco winning both. Elco went on to produce 754 70-, 77-, and 80-foot (24 m) PT boats, including Jack Kennedy’s PT109 as well as the boat that rescued General Douglas MacArthur from Corregidor.

== Later years ==
In December 1944, Scott-Paine received a cheque for $200,000 with an accompanying letter of appreciation for his contributions made to the development of the PT boat from Secretary of the Navy James Forrestal. The money was from Elco and was brokered by legal teams, releasing Elco from any and all further liabilities concerning the license rights.

In 1945 all contracts at both the Canadian and British Power boat Companies were cancelled.

Scott-Paine was divorced in 1946 and married Margaret Dinkeldein, his secretary, in New York in the same year. His health had not been good for years and in April, two months later, he suffered a stroke.

In 1948 he was made an American citizen. Hubert Scott-Paine died at Greenwich, Connecticut, on 14 April 1954, aged 63.
