= Miss Britain III =

Racing power boat

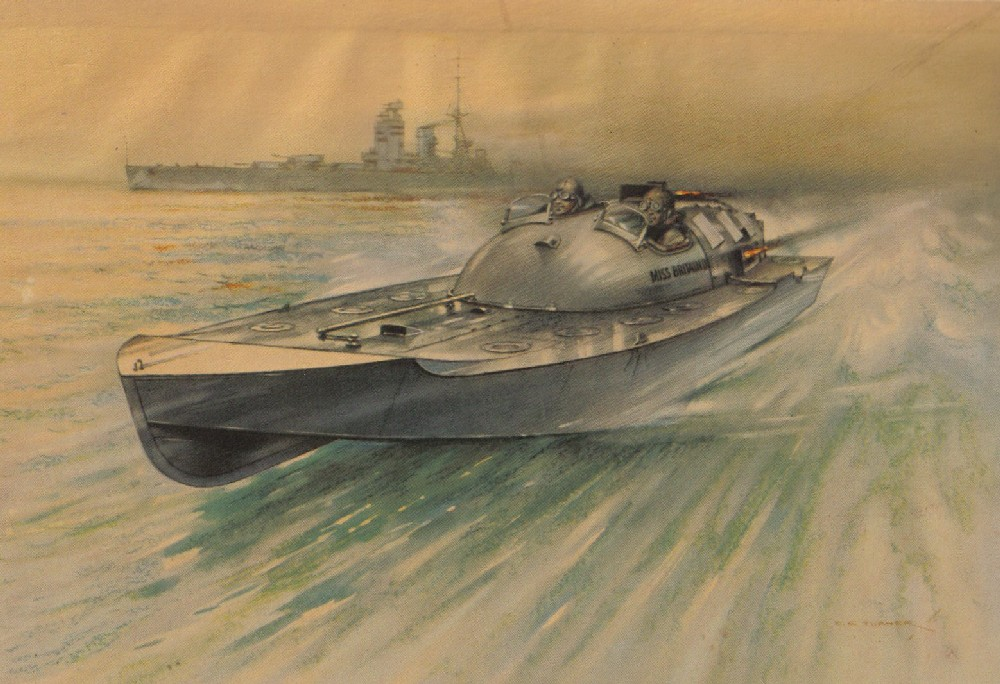
Miss Britain III on Southampton Water

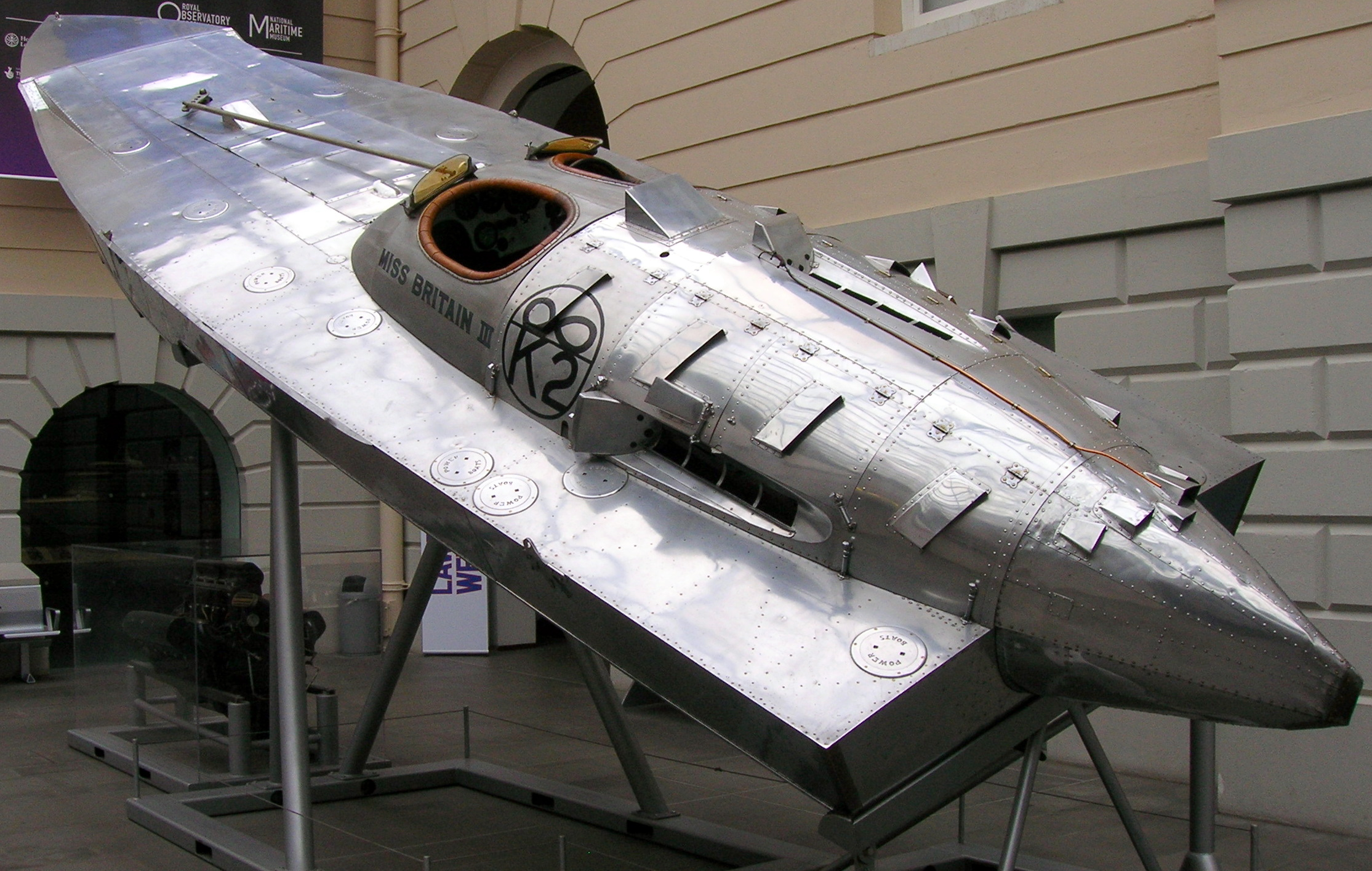
Miss Britain III in the National Maritime Museum, London.

Miss Britain III is a racing power boat designed and built by Hubert Scott-Paine.

In 1932, Scott-Paine asked Rolls-Royce for a 2,500 hp (1,900 kW) 'R' engine which had powered the winning entrant in the 1931 Schneider Trophy. He planned to challenge Garfield 'Gar' Wood's Miss America X for the Harmsworth Trophy. No engine was then available so there the matter rested.

In February 1933, with the success of his Power-Napier engine to which he had exclusive rights, Scott-Paine issued his challenge for the Harmsworth Trophy. Within less than ten weeks, he had designed and built Miss Britain III in conditions of great secrecy at his Hythe workshops. The result was revolutionary, with stringers of metal-reinforced wood and aluminium cladding, a single 1,350 horsepower (1,010 kW) Napier Lion VIID engine, and a length of only 24 feet 6 inches (7.5 m). The attention to detail is evident in the thousands of duralumin countersunk screws with the slots all in line with the water or air flow. George Selman designed a new propeller after the existing designs proved unsatisfactory. Testing was carried out in great secrecy on Southampton Water in the early dawn.

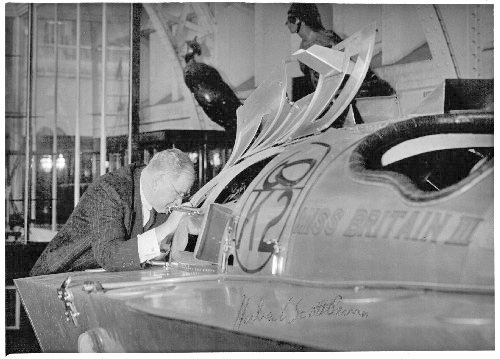
Hubert Scott-Paine after presenting Miss Britain III to the National Maritime Museum in 1951

The team sailed for America in August 1933 and the contest was held on the St. Clair River at Algonac, Michigan, on 4 September. The contest was very closely fought, but Wood managed to win by a small margin, and Scott-Paine returned to Britain to a hero's welcome.

Following a fire on board which was quickly put out and the boat repaired, a record breaking attempt was made on 16 November 1933 on Southampton Water by Scott-Paine and Gordon Thomas, becoming the first boat to pass 100mph (161km/h).

Miss Britain III was taken to Venice in 1934 where Scott-Paine won both the Prince of Piedmont's Cup and the Count Volpi Trophy.

In 1951 Scott-Paine presented Miss Britain III to the National Maritime Museum where it remains on view.
