= Ascot =

Ascot, Ascott or Askot may refer to:

== Places ==
=== Australia ===
- Ascot, Queensland, suburb of Brisbane
- Ascot, Queensland (Toowoomba Region), a locality
- Ascot Park, South Australia, suburb of Adelaide
- Ascot (Ballarat), town near Ballarat in Victoria
- Ascot (Bendigo), suburb of Bendigo in Victoria
- Ascot Vale, Victoria, suburb of Melbourne
  - Electoral district of Ascot Vale, former electoral district of the Victorian Legislative Assembly
- Ascot, Western Australia, suburb of Perth
  - Electoral district of Ascot, former electoral district of the Western Australia Legislative Assembly

=== Canada ===
- Mont-Bellevue, Quebec, which comprises the former town of Ascot
- Ascot Corner, Quebec

=== India ===
- Askot

=== New Zealand ===
- Ascot Park, New Zealand, suburb of Porirua

=== United Kingdom ===
- Ascot, Berkshire
  - North Ascot
  - South Ascot
- Ascott, Buckinghamshire
  - Ascott House
- Ascott, Oxfordshire
- Ascott, Warwickshire
- Ascott-under-Wychwood, Oxfordshire
- Ascott d'Oyley, Oxfordshire
- Ascott Earl, Oxfordshire

== Stadia and racing facilities ==
- Ascot Racecourse, a Berkshire, England horse racing facility
  - Ascot Gold Cup, major race held at Ascot Racecourse
- Ascot Racecourse, Western Australia, a horse racing facility
- Ascot Stadium, a facility in Gweru, Zimbabwe
- Ascot Park (speedway), a motor racing track in Los Angeles
- Legion Ascot Speedway, a motor racing track in Los Angeles

== Automobiles ==
- Ascot (1904 automobile)
- Ascot (1914 automobile)
- Ascot (1928 automobile)
- Honda Ascot

== Motorcycles ==
- Honda Ascot, a 500cc motorcycle first produced in 1982

== Clothing ==
- Ascot cap, a distinctive cap with a rounded shape
- Ascot tie, a type of cravat or scarf

== Military ==
- Ascot-class minesweeper
  - HMS Ascot (1916), one of the ships of this class

== Other uses ==
- The Ascott Limited
- Ascot (finance)
- Ascott (surname)

== Related terms ==
- Eastcote (disambiguation)
- Eastcott (disambiguation)
