= Automotive industry in Hungary =

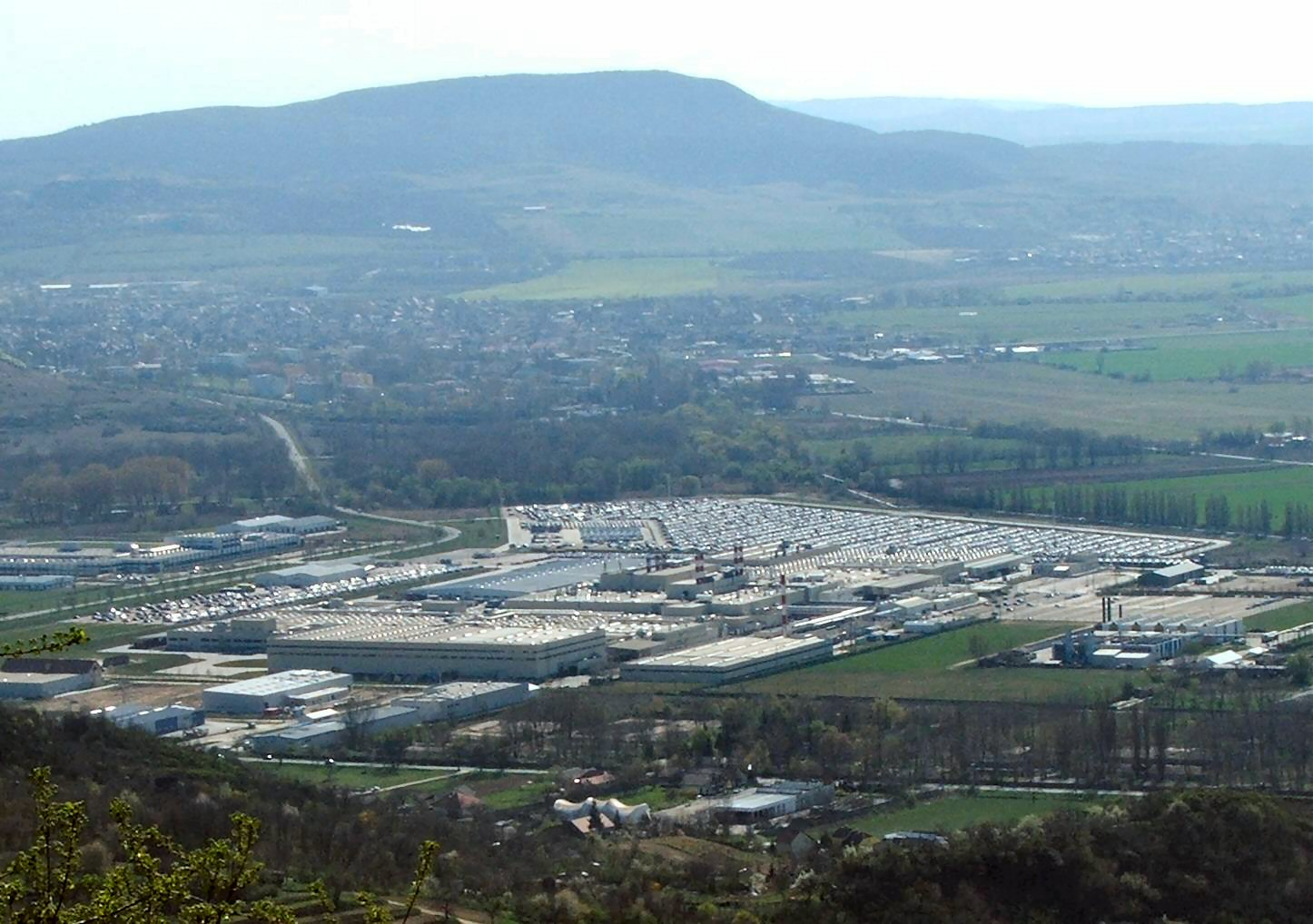
Magyar Suzuki in Esztergom, Hungary, had over 6,300 employees as of 2007

Hungary significantly decreased the manufacturing of buses but found a large assembly capacities of foreign brands (such as Mercedes-Benz, Suzuki, Audi, BMW, Skoda, SEAT, Volkswagen, Fiat, Ford, Chevrolet, Citroën, Peugeot, Renault and Opel) with annual production of more than 800 000 cars.

== History ==
Some original Hungarian car production at the beginning of the 20th century was lost. Hungary widely imported cars and trucks from the Soviet Union and some other countries of the Eastern Bloc under the Cold War. At the same time Hungary produced a small number of heavy trucks (Rába) and had strong specialisation in the Eastern Bloc in manufacturing of buses (Ikarus), that made it one of the largest bus producers and exporters (including outside of the Eastern Bloc and Europe). The Ganz Works, also a long lived Hungarian company, has been manufacturing engines and wagons that are specialised for electric railway equipment. As of 2026, this industry contributes around 21% of Hungary's total exports.

=== Active manufacturers ===
- Audi Hungaria Zrt.
- Csepel Holding (manufacturer of electric buses and EV Ready Series hybrid buses)
- Csepel Automobile Factory (manufacturer of industrial trucks)
- Credobus (for example Credo BC 11)
- Ikarus Bus (bus manufacturer)
- Magyar Suzuki (automobile manufacturing plant based in Esztergom, subsidiary of Suzuki)
- Mercedes-Benz Manufacturing Hungary in Kecskemét
- Rába (company) (public limited company, produce military trucks, trucks, rail cars, trains, bridges steel structures)

=== Defunct manufacturers ===
- Alfabusz
- Astra Arad
- Csonka
- Fejes
- Hódgép
- MÁG

== Gallery ==
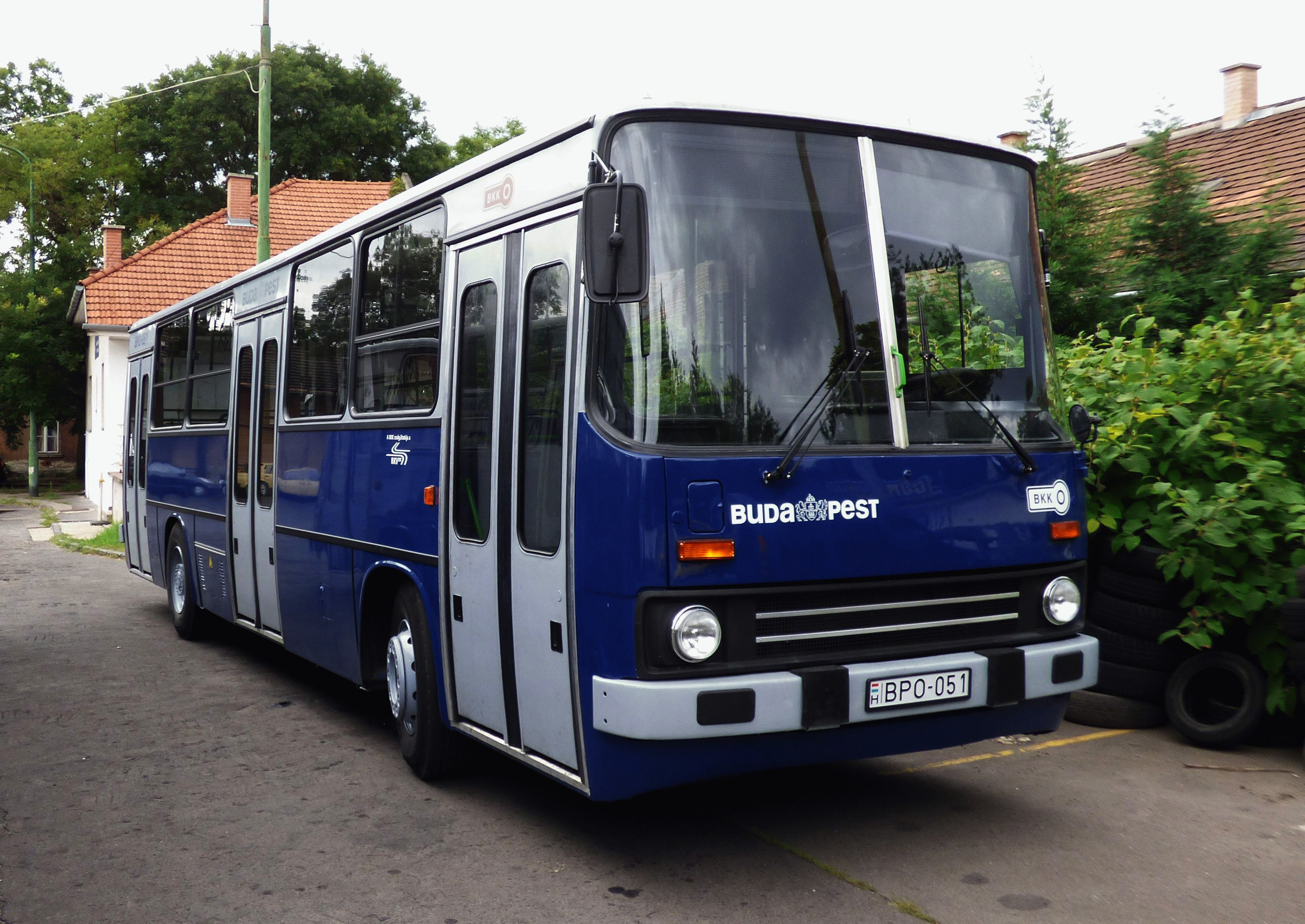
Ikarus 260 bus

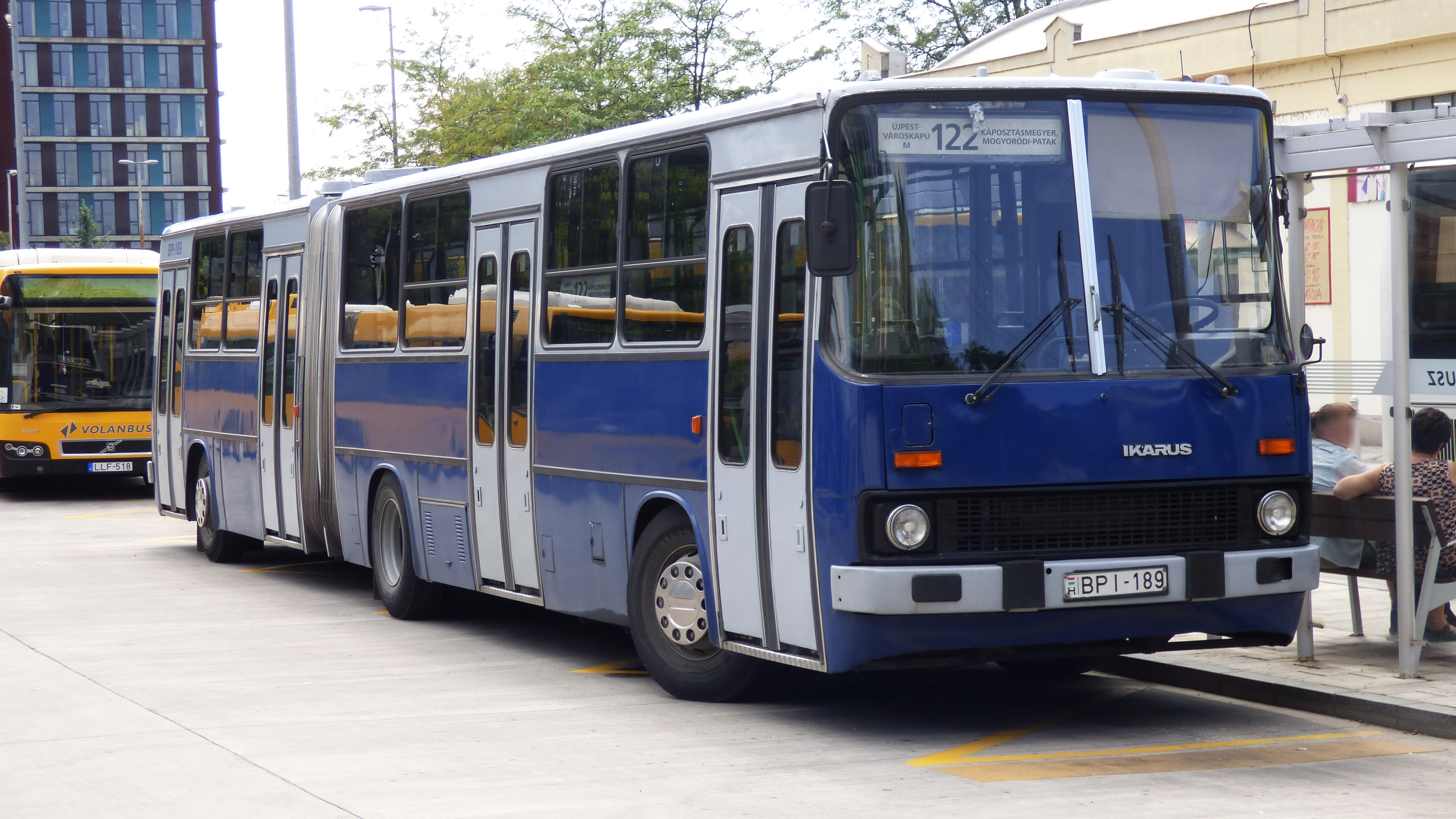
Ikarus 280 bus

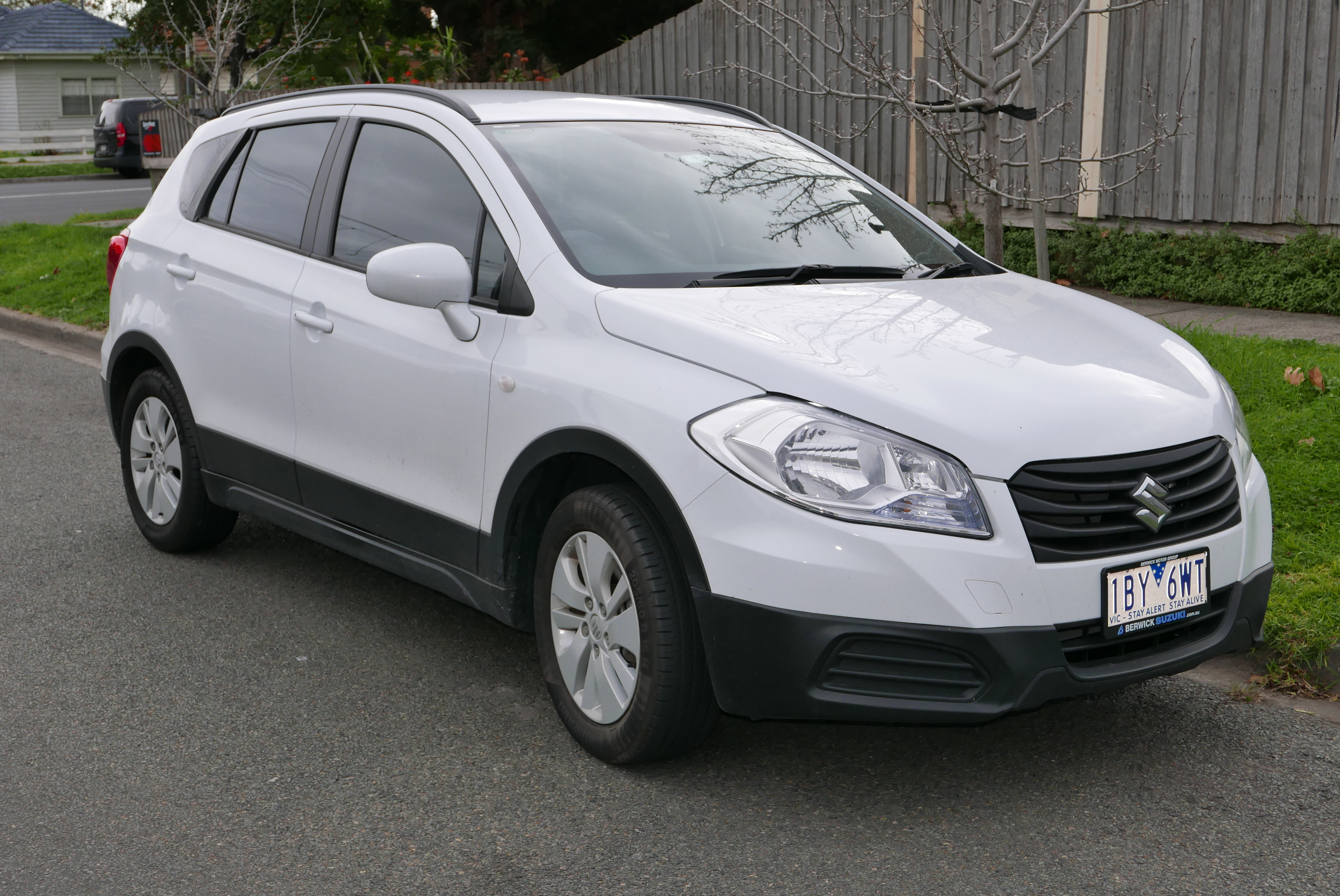
Suzuki SX4 S-Cross

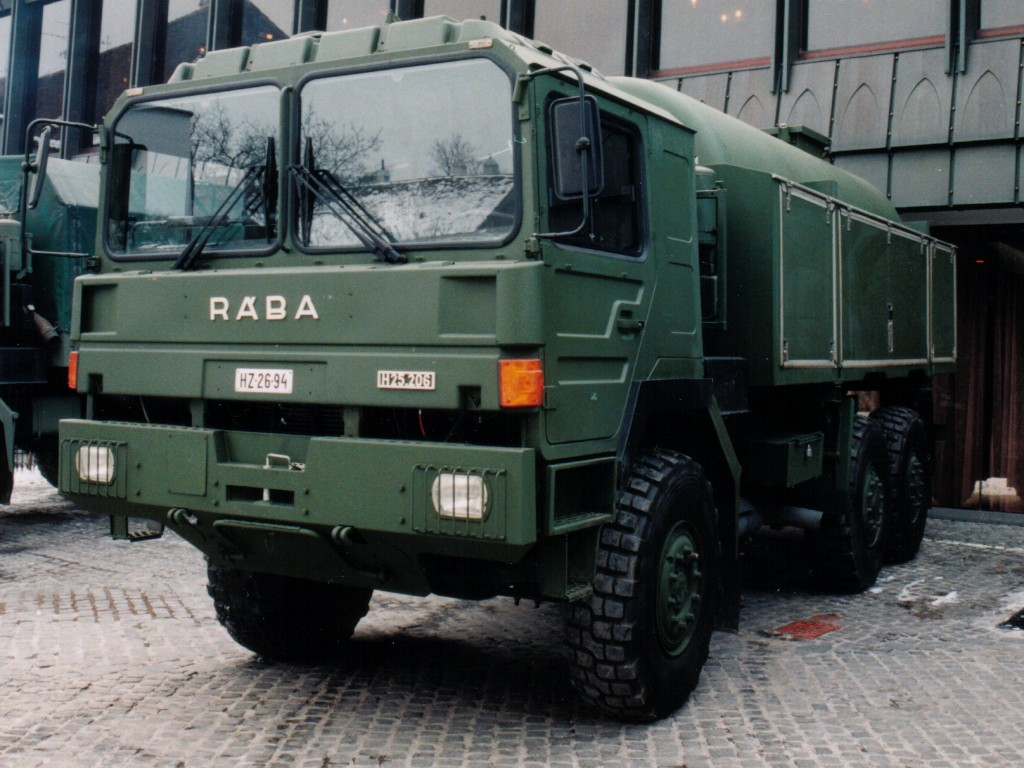
RÁBA Military truck

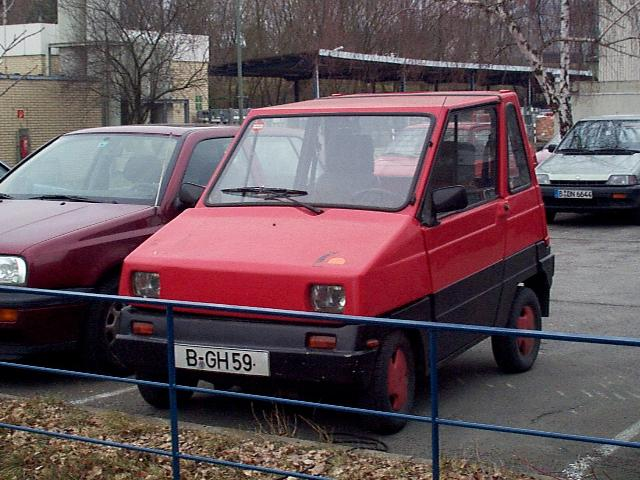
Hódgép Puli
