= Ascot-Pullin 500 =

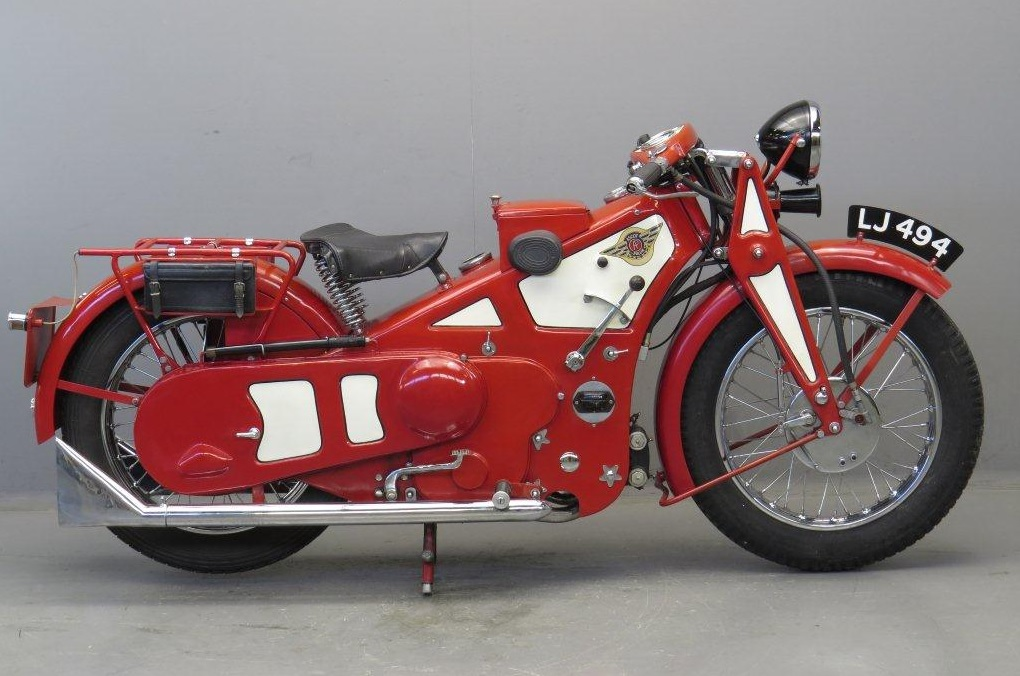
- Right side of a 1929 Ascot-Pullin 500
- Manufacturer: Ascot-Pullin Motorcycles
- Production: 1928–1930
- Predecessor: Pullin-Groom
- Engine: 496 cc (30.3 cu in) air-cooled OHV single
- Top speed: 70 mph (110 km/h)
- Power: 17 bhp (13 kW)
- Transmission: Three speed chain final drive
- Suspension: Pressed steel girder front, rigid rear
- Brakes: Drum front and rear
- Weight: 330 lb (150 kg) (dry)

The Ascot-Pullin 500 was a motorcycle made by Ascot-Pullin Motorcycles in Letchworth, Hertfordshire in 1928. As an updated version of the Pullin motor bicycle of 1919, the Ascot-Pullin 500 overhead valve single was the first time hydraulic brakes were used on a motorcycle.

== History ==
In 1919, British inventor Cyril Pullin and Stanley L. Groom produced the Pullin motor bicycle, a wheeled machine that included a novel two-stroke engine and extensive manufacture use of steel pressings that anticipated developments by British motorcycle manufacturer Ariel Motorcycles in the late 1950s and Japanese motorcycle manufacturers in 1960s. The bicycle was patented in 1920. Since 1920, Pullin had been working with Stanley Groom to develop and patent a two-stroke motorcycle with a unique design of pressed sheet metal frame and forks. After working on a range of other inventions including the Ascot, Pullin teamed up with Groom again to further develop their ideas and patent the Ascot Pullin motorcycle, with a four-stroke rather than two-cycle engine. At a time when manufacturers were taking a very traditional approach to motorcycle design with conventional frames and engine layout, Pullin and Grom were keen to create an enclosed feel by mounting the engine horizontally within a pressed-steel frame. As well as the hydraulic brakes, Pullin also designed a telescopic centre stand and an adjustable windshield, complete with a windscreen wiper and rear-view mirror, as well as a fully enclosed chain and interchangeable wheels.

With estimated 17 bhp (13 kW), the Ascot-Pullin was capable of 70 mph (110 km/h), but approximately 400 to 500 were produced, so few survive to this day.

Pullin's influence can be seen in the emergence of the Ariel Leader and the Vincent Black Prince thirty years later, which both developed the enclosed concept in an attempt to attract a wider range of customers. As with the Ascot-Pullin, however, the fully enclosed look has never really led to high volume sales but instead attracts a niche market.

At present, the U.S. National Highway Traffic Safety Administration recognizes that the first hydraulic brakes on motorcycles occurred in 1952.

== See also ==
- List of motorcycles of the 1920s
