= Arab (automobile) =

Arab Sports
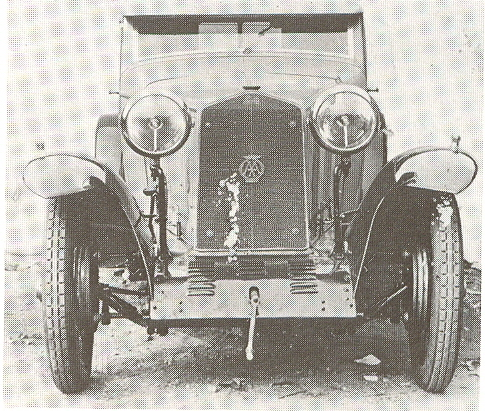
- 1927 Arab

Overview
- Manufacturer: Arab Motors
- Production: 1926–1928; 10 approx

Body and chassis
- Body style: tourer saloon

Powertrain
- Engine: 2 L four cylinder engine, single overhead cam
- Transmission: 4-speed manual

Dimensions
- Wheelbase: 110 in (2,794 mm)
- Length: 154 in (3,912 mm)

The Arab was a high-performance English automobile designed by Reid Railton and manufactured in Letchworth, Hertfordshire, between 1926 and 1928. The factory had previously been used by the Phoenix car company.

== History ==
The car came about following discussions between J. G. Parry-Thomas, design engineer at Leyland Motors, Reid Railton, his assistant and Henry Spurrier, chairman of Leyland Motors. Leyland had made 50 four-cylinder engine blocks intended to be used in fast delivery vans, but the project was not proceeded with. The three discussed what to do with the blocks, and the building of a 2-litre sporting car was agreed. A prototype was built to test the new engine using an Enfield-Allday chassis and the car taken to Brooklands for the 1924 Easter Meeting. The engine had an overhead camshaft with the same unusual valve springing using leaf springs as those found on Parry Thomas's Leyland Eight. Drive was to the rear wheels via a Moss 4-speed gearbox and ENV spiral-bevel rear axle. It was one of the first English cars to use an electric fuel pump. Production of two variants was started in 1926 at the Letchworth works, a low-chassis sporting model and a high-chassis touring type. Two and four-seater bodies were available on the high-chassis at £525 and probably only the two-seater on the low-chassis at £550.

Parry Thomas died in March 1927 attempting to break the World Land Speed Record in his car Babs, and with his death Railton lost interest in the Arab and the Letchworth works closed after only about 6 or 7 cars were made. The remaining components were bought by Thomson & Taylor, where Railton was working, based at Brooklands and a few more cars were assembled. This was something of a pity, as the car was an impressive performer with the two-seater high chassis good for 80 mph, and the Super Sports was said to have been capable of going 90 mph (140 km/h). One high chassis is known to have been supercharged and is said to have achieved 105 mph (169 km/h).

Two cars are known to survive, both low chassis.

== Specification ==
=== Engine ===
- 1960 cc four-cylinder water-cooled monobloc.
- Two bearing crankshaft
- 70 mm bore 127 mm stroke
- Single overhead cam, leaf spring controlled valves with positive closing.
- Single Claudel-Hobson carburettor
- 65 bhp at 4000 rpm

=== Gearbox ===
- Moss 4-speed

=== Chassis ===
- Wheelbase 88.5 inches (2,250 mm), track 52 inches (1,300 mm), overall length 154 inches (3,900 mm)
- Half-elliptical springs front and rear
- Four wheel brakes (Perrot System)
