= Cyril Pullin =

British motorcycle pioneer (1892–1973)

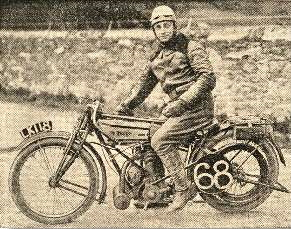
- Cyril Pullin on his Rudge after the 1914 Isle of Man TT
- Born: 18 August 1892; Wandsworth, London, England
- Died: 23 April 1973 (aged 80); Poole, Dorset, England
- Occupations: Motorcycle designer, racer and aeronautical engineer

Cyril Pullin (18 August 1892 – 23 April 1973) was a British inventor, engineer and motorcycle race driver. His inventions contributed to the rotary engine and the helicopter. His son was the pilot for the first successful British helicopter flight in 1938. Pullin died in 1973 aged 80.

== Early life ==
Cyril George Pullin was born 1892 in Wandsworth, London. He became a well known motorcycle racer and in 1914 won the Isle of Man TT race.

== Racing career ==
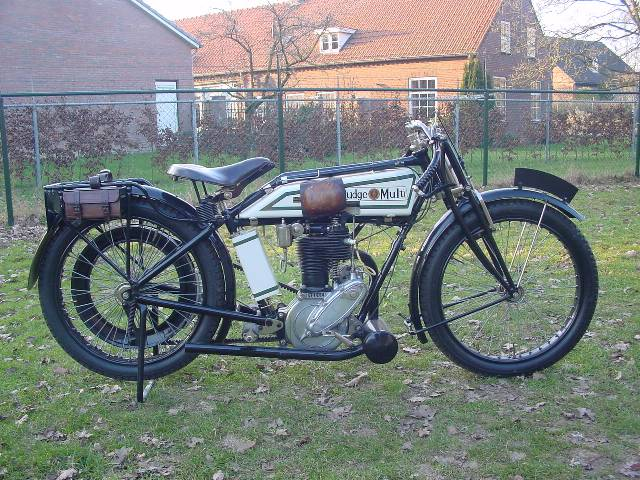
1915 Rudge Multi TT 500cc

In 1914, Pullin won the Isle of Man TT with a record average of 49.49 mph (79.65 km/h) on a Rudge Multi which had a variable belt drive gearbox giving an effective option of over 20 speeds which made a huge difference on the hills. The race, which ran for over four hours was led by Oliver Godfrey (riding an Indian) and Howard R Davies (on a Sunbeam) who dead heated for second place when Pullin overtook them both to win by only 6.4 seconds. Pullin's success on the day was sadly marred when fellow competitor in the Junior TT Frank Walker came round the final corner on his Royal Enfield to find the road blocked by people trying to see the finish. He did his best to avoid injuring spectators but was killed in the crash. Following the tragedy the organisers of the TT introduced rope barriers and crowd control.

On 23 March 1922 at Brooklands, Pullin established a new record and became the first ever British motorcyclist to be timed at over 100 m.p.h. on a 3 hp Douglas 500cc motorcycle.

== Inventions ==
In the 1920s, Pullin developed various helicopter engine patents and in the 1940s he developed the "Powerwheel", a rotary engine in the hub of a motorcycle wheel, a rotating single-cylinder engine known as a "one-lunger". This consisted of just the cylinder and a clutch which could be engaged and disengaged, with a simple drum brake. The invention never entered production but is credited as an important step in rotary engine development.

Pullin's sister was married to Stephen Leslie Bailey, a then prominent engineer at Douglas Motorcycles and many of his patents were filed under the name of that company.

== Car and motorcycle business ==
In 1928, Pullin took over the former Phoenix factory in Letchworth, Hertfordshire, to produce Ascot-Pullin Motorcycles and the Ascot car based on the Hungarian Fejes, with chassis and 10 hp engine assembled from welded steel pressings. It never went into production.

A larger car, the Ascot Gold Cup Six with a 2423 cc six-cylinder engine possibly made by Continental, three-speed gearbox and servo brakes did become a reality and a few production cars were made. It was advertised as being available as a two-seat sports, coupé or fabric saloon.

== Rotary wing aircraft ==
In 1932, Pullin joined G & J Weir Ltd's aircraft department, in Glasgow, Scotland, as chief designer to develop single-place autogyros. Pullin and his team designed a series of autogiros before moving on to a small helicopter using two rotors mounted atop outriggers each side of the fuselage. The Weir W.5 was a single-seat helicopter powered by an air-cooled engine, and established a maximum airspeed of 70 mph. Its two two-blade, fixed-pitch rotors had swashplate-actuated cyclic control. The W.5 made its first flight at Dalrymple, Ayrshire, on 7 June 1938, when it was piloted by Raymond Pullin and it became the first British helicopter to fly successfully. By World War II the W.5 had logged eighty hours' flying time and was followed by a scaled-up version, the W.6, which was the first two-seater helicopter in the world, powered by a much more powerful DH Gipsy aero engine. Further progress on this model was prevented by World War II.

Pullin designed the 1500 cc "Flat Twin" and the "4-Cylinder"(later called Pixie when licensed to Aero Engines Ltd of Bristol) engines which followed it. These were used in the Weir W2, W3 and W4 autogiros. The "Four Cylinder" was adapted to power the twin-rotor W5 Helicopter.

After the war, development at the Cierva Autogiro Company of the W.9 "Drainpipe" and the 24-passenger-carrying W.11 Air Horse helicopters continued under the direction of Pullin. A fatal crash of the W11 Air Horse, due to a small component fatigue failure, put an end to this very promising heavy-lift helicopter project. The remnants of the Cierva Autogiro Company were taken over by Saunders Roe, who continued the development of the small Skeeter helicopter and put it into production.

== See also ==
- Ascot (1928 automobile)
- Fairey FB-1 Gyrodyne
