= Leyland Eight =

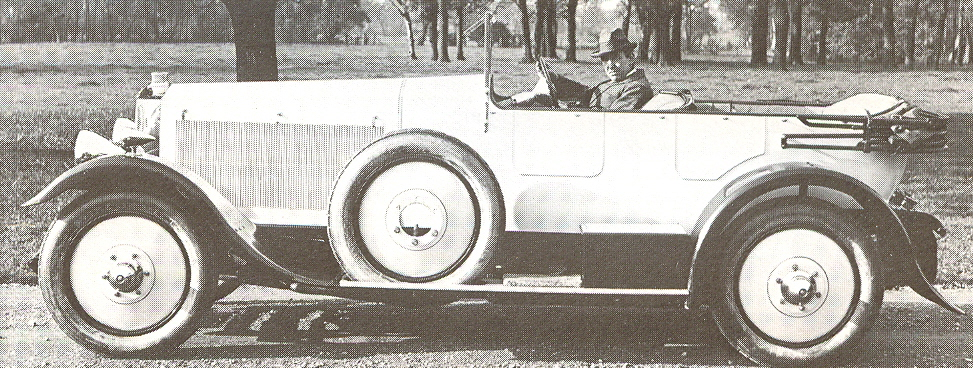
- 1921 Leyland Eight four-seater tourer

Overview
- Manufacturer: Leyland Motors
- Production: 1920–1923; 18 made
- Designer: J.G. Parry-Thomas

Body and chassis
- Class: Grand tourer

Powertrain
- Engine: 6.9–litre OHC Straight-8; 7.3–litre OHC Straight-8
- Transmission: 4–speed

Dimensions
- Wheelbase: 141 in (3,600 mm); 150 in (3,800 mm); 126 in (3,200 mm) (speed model)

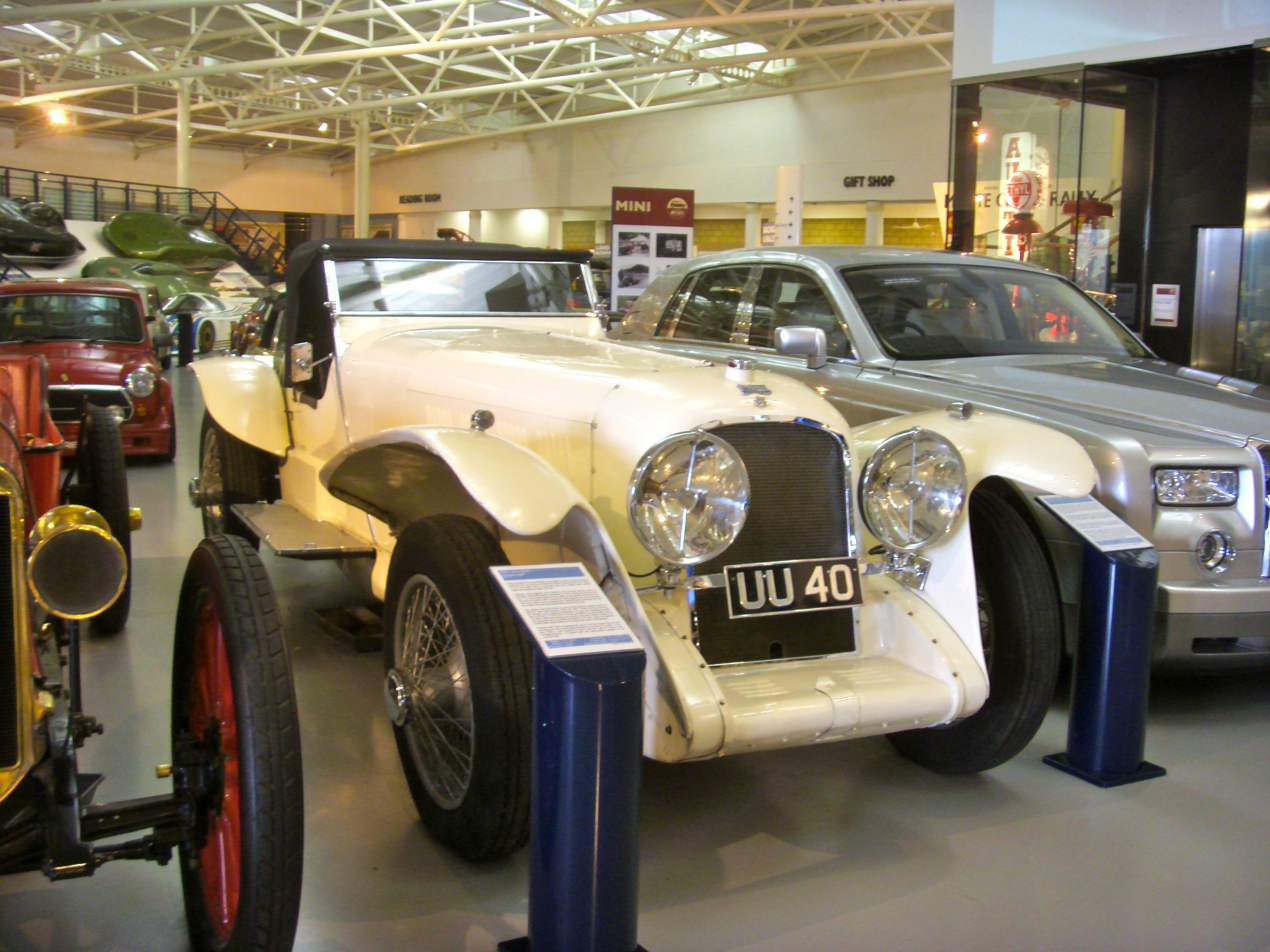
A 1927 Leyland Eight, with sports bodywork

The Leyland Eight or Straight Eight was a luxury car produced by Leyland Motors from 1920 to 1923.

The car was designed by the chief engineer of Leyland Motors, J.G. Parry-Thomas and his assistant Reid Railton, and was intended to be the finest car available. It was the first British car with a straight-eight engine and Leyland managing director Henry Spurrier II (d.1942) told the company's board that it was better than a Rolls-Royce in every respect. The Eight was introduced to the public at the 1920 International Motor Exhibition at Olympia, London, where it was referred to as the "Lion of Olympia".

== Engine and transmission ==
The engine, with cylinder block and upper crankcase cast in one piece, had a single centrally mounted overhead camshaft, hemispherical combustion chambers, and an 89 mm (3.5 in) bore. The engine was offered in one of two capacities: 6,920 cc (422 cu in) with a 140 mm (5.5 in) stroke, producing 115 bhp (86 kW) at 2,500 rpm or 7,266 cc (443.4 cu in) with a 146 mm (5.7 in) stroke and twin carburettors, producing 146 bhp (109 kW) at 3,500 rpm. The crankshaft ran in five bearings. Ignition was by coil and distributor rather than magneto which was the more usual British practice at the time.

Transmission was through a single plate clutch to a separately mounted four speed gearbox. The rear axle was unconventional with the differential mounted ahead of the axle. The spiral bevel crown wheel and pinion arrangement had two crown wheels each attached to a half shaft allowing them to be arranged at an angle to each other to give the rear wheels a positive camber.

== Chassis and suspension ==
The channel section chassis had suspension by leaf springs at the front and a mix of leaf springs and torsion bars at the rear. At the front semi-elliptical springs were used with radius arms controlling fore and aft movement of the axle. The radius arms were joined by a torsion bar across the front of the chassis to act as an anti-roll bar. At the rear the quarter-elliptical springs had their front ends mounted in a boss that was attached to a short transverse torsion bar which controlled the rotation of the boss making the suspension a hybrid arrangement. As at the front linked radius rods provided axle location and anti-roll properties.

The brakes, with vacuum servo assistance, were on the rear wheels only.

== Coachwork ==
Factory-made bodies were available in open tourer style with either two or five seats and chassis were also supplied to customers for their choice of coachbuilders which included Vanden Plas and Windovers.

== Production and sales ==
The car was very expensive; the chassis for delivery to a coachbuilder costing £2,500 in 1920 reducing to £1,875 in 1922. Since Leyland was severely short of cash due to other problems, Spurrier reduced the launch production target to one hundred; by 1923, the car was produced only for firm orders, which were discouraged. In the end, only about 18 were made. It was the most expensive British car of its day.

Today, the only example known to exist, a Leyland-Thomas, is one assembled from spares in 1929 and in the collection of the British Motor Industry Heritage Trust (BMIHT) and displayed in the British Motor Museum (formerly the Heritage Motor Centre).

== Leyland-Thomas ==
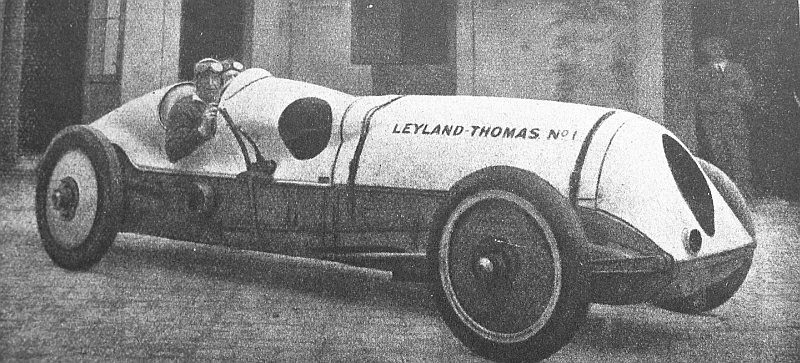
The 1924 Leyland-Thomas No. 1

After amicably leaving Leyland in 1922 J. G. Parry-Thomas moved to premises at Brooklands race track taking with him at least three chassis and a large quantity of spares. There he built the Leyland-Thomas, a racing special based on the Leyland Eight. After the death of Parry Thomas his premises were taken over by Thomson & Taylor who built the car now owned by the BMIHT.

== Owners ==
Michael Collins, the Irish politician and revolutionary leader, was travelling in a Leyland Eight when he was fatally shot in 1922.

Two cars were ordered by the Maharaja of Patiala but are not thought to survive.

== See also ==
- Arab Motors – a car company formed by Railton.
