= Eastcote (disambiguation) =

Eastcote is an area in the London Borough of Hillingdon.

Eastcote may also refer to the following places in England:

- Eastcote tube station
- Eastcote (ward), a former electoral ward of Hillingdon London Borough Council that existed from 1965 to 2002
- Eastcote and East Ruislip (ward), a former electoral ward of Hillingdon London Borough Council that existed from 2002 to 2022
- Eastcote, Northamptonshire
- Eastcote, West Midlands, an area in Solihull

== See also ==
- Ascot (disambiguation)
- Eastcott (disambiguation)
