= Phoenix (British automobile company) =

English manufacturer of automobiles, motorcycles and tricars

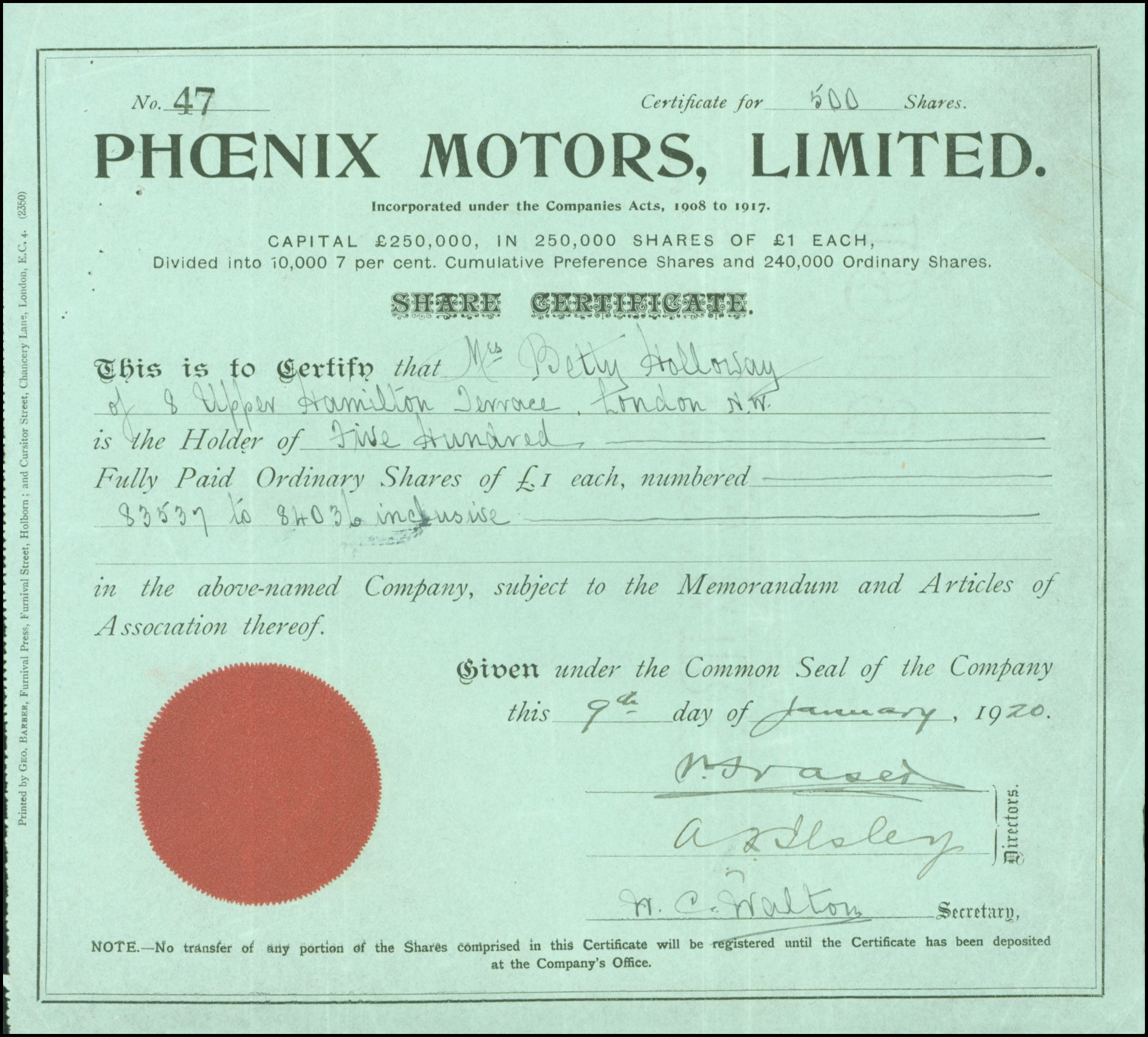
Share of the Phoenix Motors Ltd., issued 9. January 1920

Phoenix was an English manufacturer of automobiles, motorcycles and tricars (motor tricycles) active from 1903–1926. It was founded by a Belgian, Joseph van Hooydonk, at his factory in Holloway Road, North London, and named after the Phoenix Cycle Club.

The company moved from its London base to Letchworth, Hertfordshire, in 1911, but failed to survive the 1920s going into liquidation in 1924 but assembling a few more cars in the following two years.

The Letchworth factory went on to be used for car manufacture by Ascot and Arab.

== Production ==
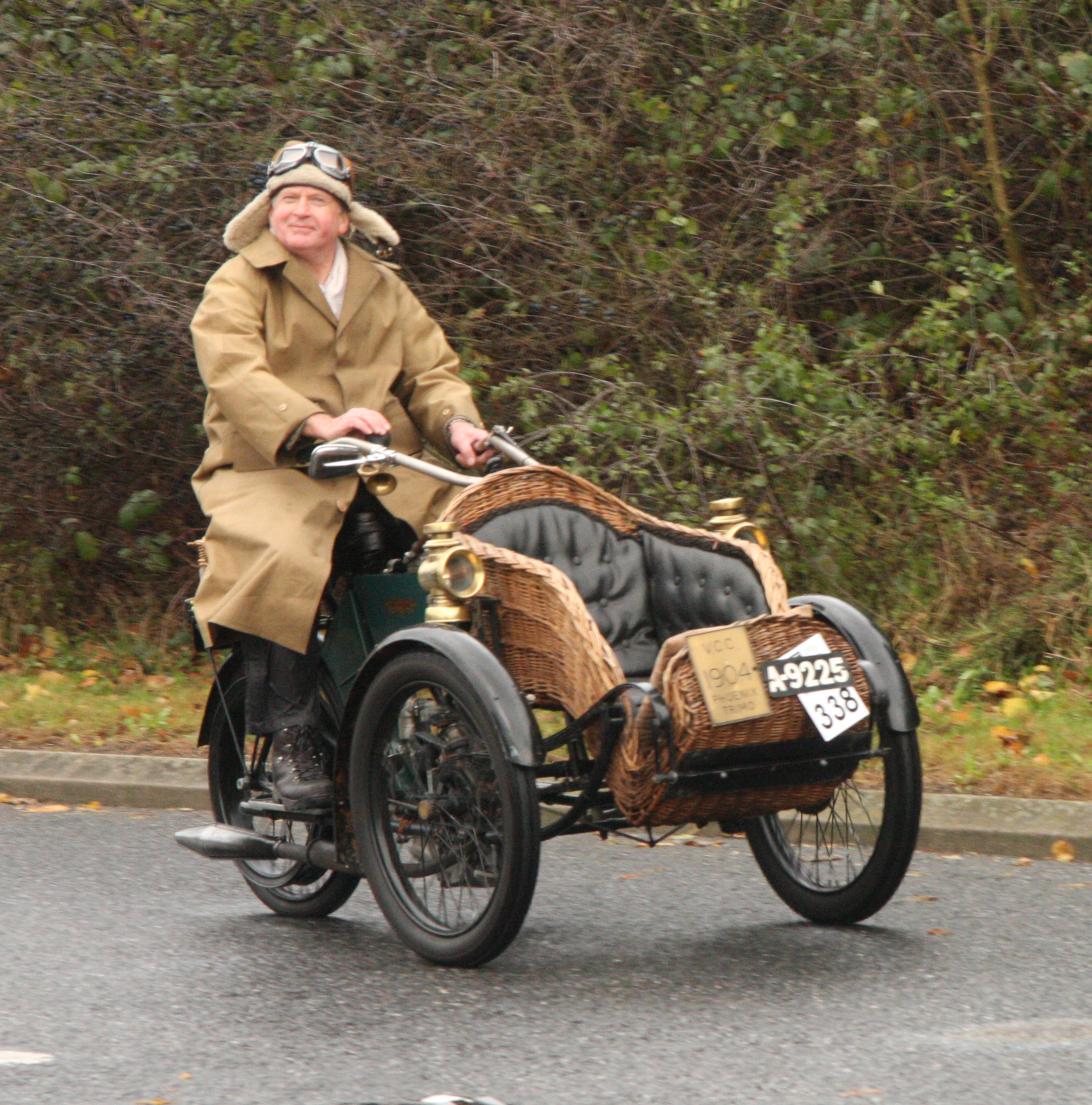
Phoenix Trimo

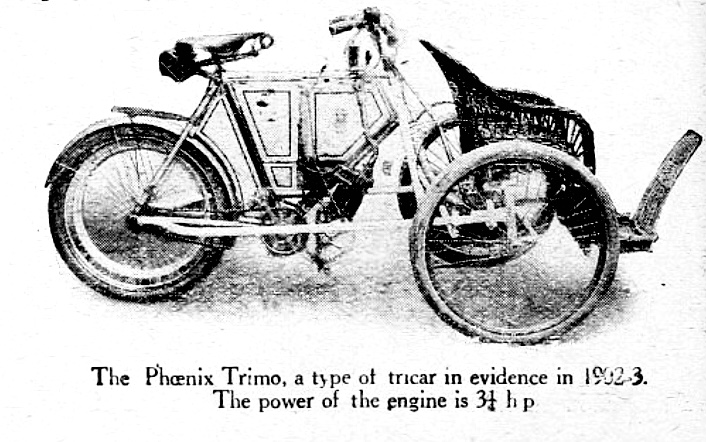
Phoenix Trimo 3,25 hp (1902-1904)

The first product was a motor tricycle called the Trimo with an engine imported from the Belgian Minerva company. This was followed in 1905 by a single seat four wheeler the Quadcar with 6/7hp twin cylinder Fafnir engine.

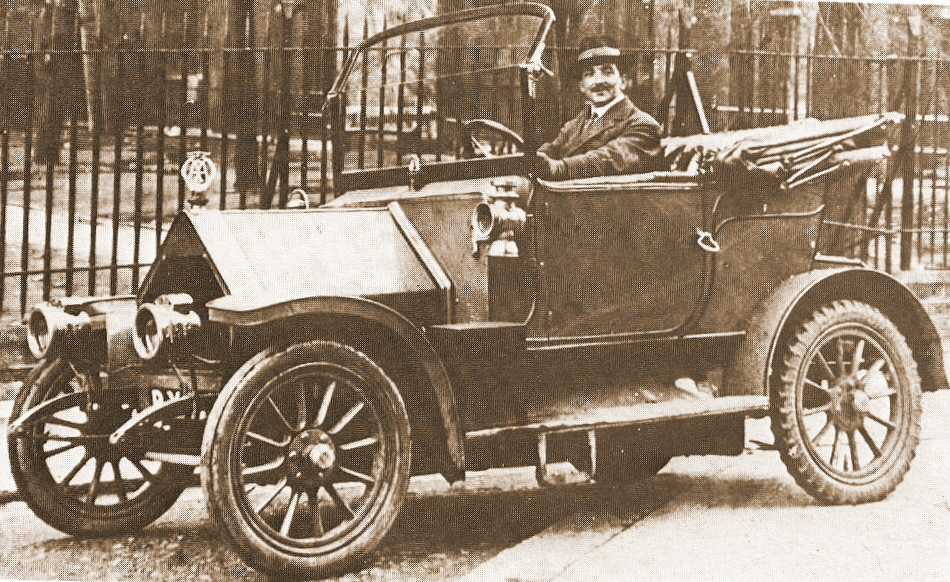
Phoenix 8/10 of 1912

A proper four wheel car was introduced in 1908 as the 8/10 with 8hp engine and chain drive to a three speed transmission with further chain to the rear axle.

After the move to Letchworth a larger 11.9hp model with 1496 cc 4 cylinder engine, three speed transmission and worm final drive. It had the radiator behind the engine, Approximately seven cars a week were being made by a workforce of 150 at the outbreak of World War I.

The 11.9 was re-introduced in 1919 still with the scuttle radiator but changing to a more conventional front radiator in 1921. For 1922 the 11.9 was replaced by the 12/25 with Meadows 1795 cc and four speed transmission.

A small number of six cylinder cars were made in 1925.

== Models ==
Model	Years	Cylinders	Capacity	Wheelbase	Length	Production (approx)
Trimo or 6	1904	single	699 cc			
Quadcar	1905-1910	two	804 cc	72 in (1,829 mm)	106 in (2,692 mm)	
8/10	1908-1913	two	1272 cc	84 in (2,134 mm)	124 in (3,150 mm)	
10/12	1910-1911	two	1872 cc	96 in (2,438 mm)	136 in (3,454 mm)	
12/5 or 12.9	1912	two	1872 cc	96 in (2,438 mm)	136 in (3,454 mm)	
11.9	1913-1922	four	1496 cc	96 in (2,438 mm) or 114 in (2,896 mm)	135 in (3,429 mm) or 169 in (4,293 mm)	600
12/25	1925-1926	four	1795 cc	108 in (2,743 mm)	154 in (3,912 mm)	168
Six or 18/45	1925-1926	six	2692 cc	126 in (3,200 mm)	164 in (4,166 mm)	9

== Other Phoenix car companies ==
The Phoenix name has been used by several British car makers including:

Phoenix Motor Works in Southport (1902-1904)

Phoenix Carriage Co in Birmingham (1905)

Phoenix Automotive of Moreton-in-Marsh, Gloucestershire

Phoenix Car Works Ltd in Pluckley, Kent

== See also ==
- List of car manufacturers of the United Kingdom
