= Eastcott =

Eastcott may refer to:

== Places in England ==
- Eastcott, Cornwall, a hamlet
- Eastcott, Wiltshire, a hamlet in Easterton parish
- Eastcott (ward), a ward in Swindon, Wiltshire

== People ==
- William Eastcott (1883–1972), Canadian sport shooter

== See also ==
- Ascot (disambiguation)
- Eastcote (disambiguation)
- Eastcotts, Bedfordshire
