= Alldays & Onions =

British motor manufacturer

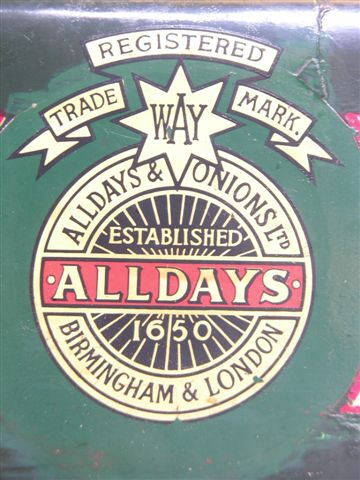
The Alldays & Onions logo

Alldays & Onions was an English engineering business and an early automobile manufacturer based at Great Western Works and Matchless Works, Small Heath, Birmingham. It manufactured cars from 1898 to 1918. The cars were sold under the Alldays & Onions name. Alldays also built an early British built tractor, the Alldays General Purpose Tractor. After the First World War, the cars were sold under the name Enfield Alldays. Car production seems to have ceased in the 1920s, but the manufacture of many other items continued. The company became part of the Mitchell Cotts Group.

== History ==
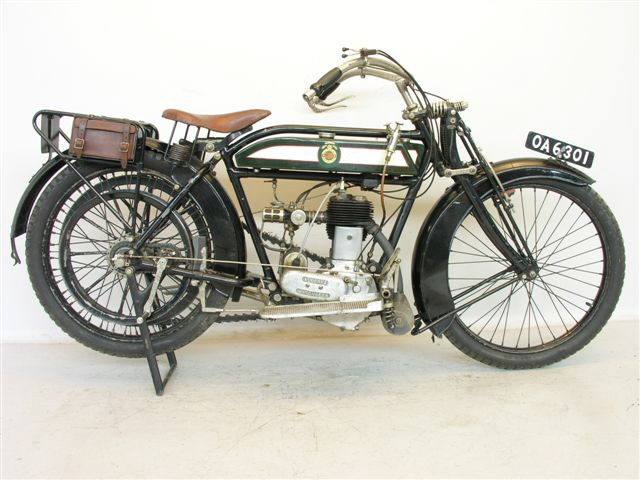
Alldays Matchless 4 pk (557 cc) 1914

Engineering businesses John C. Onions Ltd. (formed by John Onions in 1650) and William Allday & Sons Ltd. (formed by William Allday in 1720) joined in 1889 under the ownership of Alldays & Onions Pneumatic Engineering Company Limited. They made engineering and blacksmithing equipment. Like many such companies at the time they turned to bicycle manufacture and sold a range under the Alldays name. They also started making motorcycles in 1903 under the Alldays-Matchless name; these had no connection with the London-based Matchless company, and in 1915 presumably following representations from them, the name was changed to Allon. Manufacture of these continued until 1927.

Alldays and Onions produced its first car in 1898. The Traveller, a quadricycle made in private and commercial forms, was steered by a wheel. It had an unsprung rear end, power generated by a 4 hp De Dion single-cylinder motor. However, series production did not start until 1903/4 with the 7 hp model. Larger commercial vehicles of up to 5 tons were also made in the years preceding the first World War and saw service during the conflict.

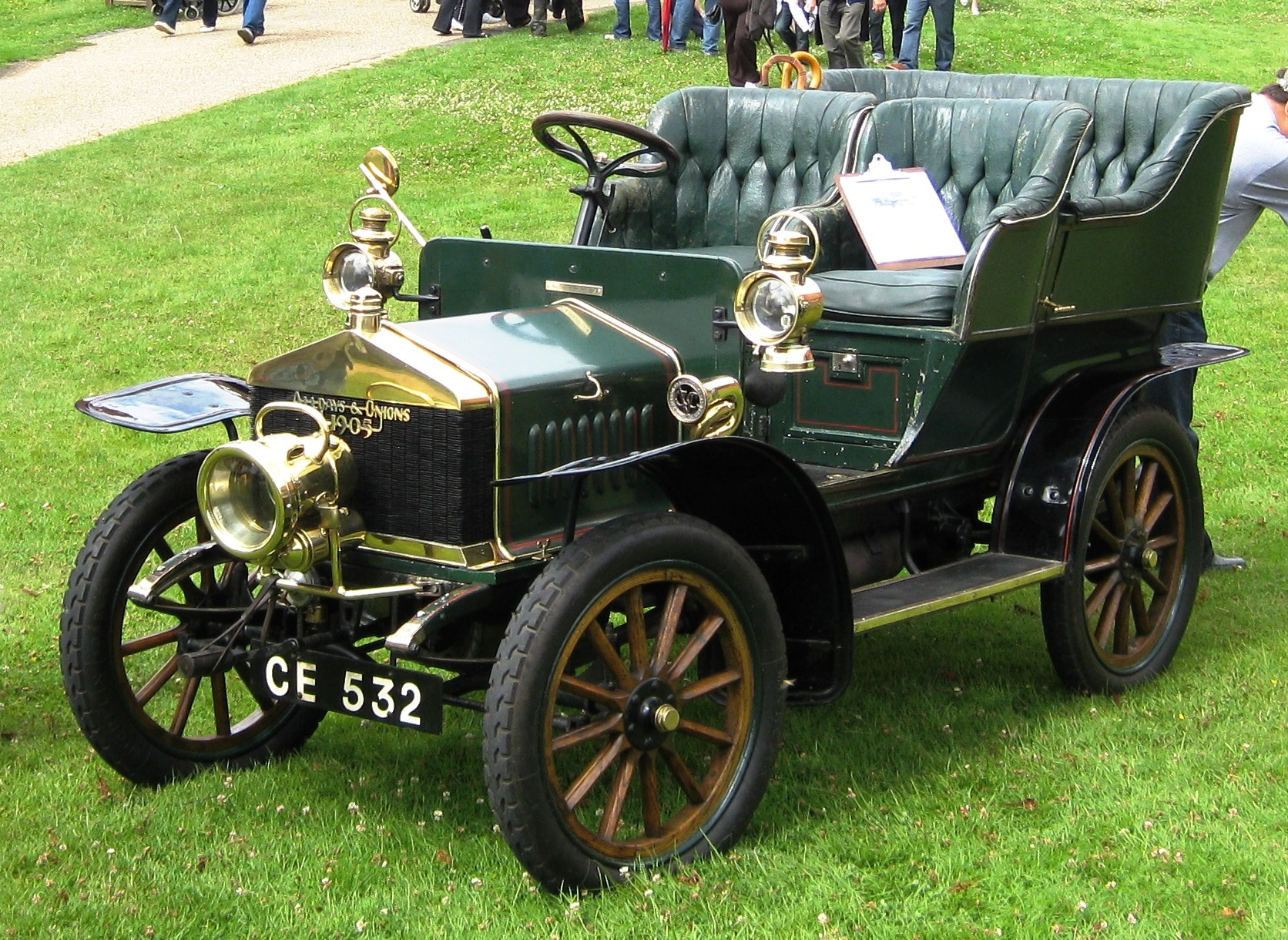
Alldays & Onions 1905

Alldays achieved commercial success with the 1.6-litre, vertical-twin side-valve 10/12, which was made from 1905 to 1913. It was popular with commercial drivers and did well in period formula events and hill-climbs. A 16 hp 4-cylinder joined the lineup in 1906, and in 1908, the Enfield Autocar Co. was acquired. Shortly afterward, the range was rationalized, with most models being sold under both brand names. The Alldays contribution to the equation was the well-established twin- and four-cylinders that put out 14 and 20 hp, always shaft-driven. A 30/35 hp six-cylinder was listed from 1911 to 1914, compressed-air starters being optional in 1911. In 1913, the 990 cc V-twin Midget cyclecar was introduced, featuring air cooling and shaft drive, selling at £138.10s. (about £13,800 today). An 1100 cc 4-cylinder version with a bullnose radiator appeared in 1914, popular at the price of £175 (about £17,500 today). Pair-cast side-valve four-cylinders rated at 12/14, 16/20, and 25/30 hp filled out the immediate pre-war offerings.

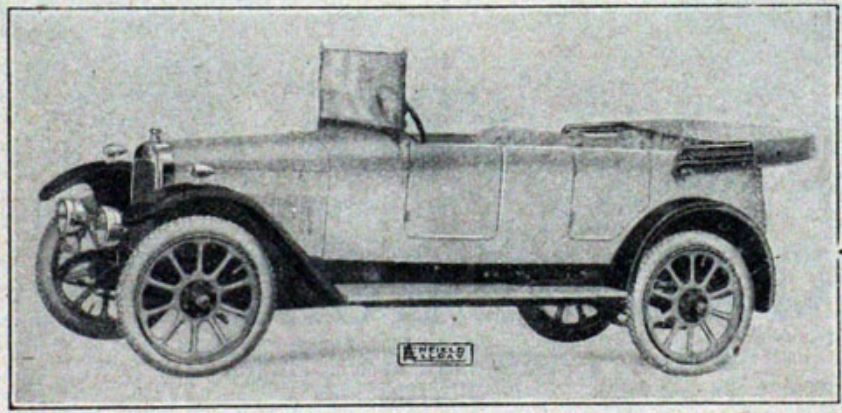
1922 Enfield-Allday 10-20 HP light car

Alldays & Onions had merged in 1908 with the short-lived Enfield Autocar Company, which had been formed to take over the car making interests of the Enfield Cycle Company. They produced cars called Enfield-Allday until 1925.

Alldays & Onions also manufactured railway inspection cars for the Great Eastern and London, Brighton and South Coast Railways. At least one of these found its way to Australia for use on the Wolgan Valley Railway. Another was built in 1906 for the extensive three-foot gauge system of the County Donegal Railways in Ireland. It later went into passenger service and became their Railcar Number 1. Although small, its success led to larger vehicles being built and contributed to the introduction of internal combustion railcars and multiple units across Ireland. It is preserved at the Ulster Folk and Transport Museum.

In 1911, Alldays & Onions produced six four-wheeled trolleybus chassis. Two of these worked in Bradford, with the other four seeing service in Leeds. These were made under contract from the Railless Electric Traction Company.

Alldays & Onions also produced a small number of buses, including seven open-top double-deckers constructed in 1915-16 for West Bridgford UDC in Nottinghamshire.

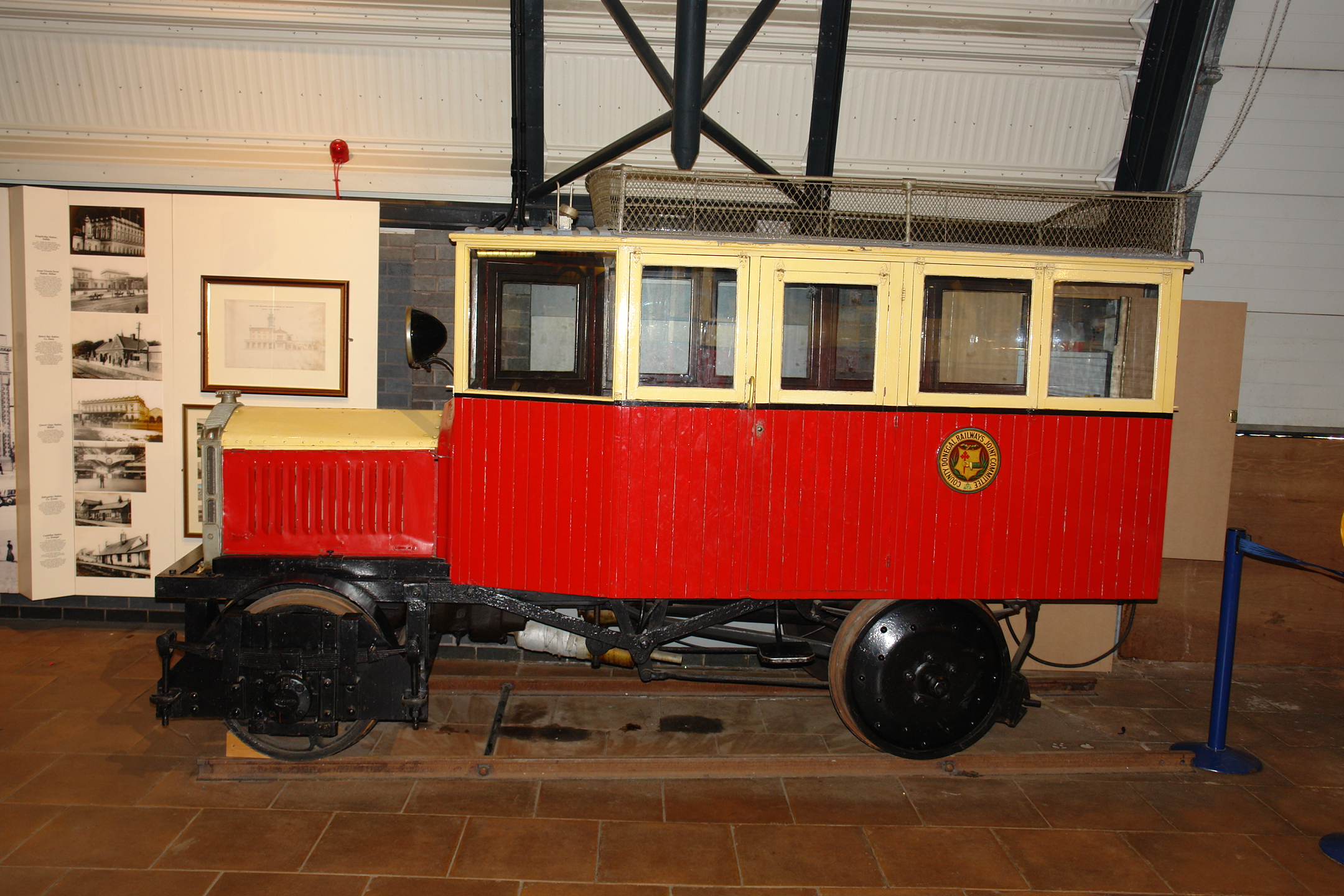
Ulster Transport Museum, Cultra, County Donegal Railways Joint Committee Railcar No 1 (03)

== Product range ==
On flotation as a public company in 1916 the following products were manufactured: motor lorries, cars and vans, cycles and motorcycles, complete outfits for foundries, engineers' and railway workshops, pneumatic power hammers, drop and lifting stamps, oil, gas and fuel furnaces, hardening shop equipment, Roots blowers, blacksmiths' shops, exhaust and blowing fans, smiths' hearths, portable forges, anvils and vices, cranes, pulley blocks, bellows, etc.

== Main Car Models ==
Year	Model	Engine	Bore x Stroke	Wheelbase	Notes
1898–1904	Traveller	4 hp De Dion single 500 cc			Quadricycle type. Two-seater - passenger in front of driver. Wheel steering. Rear "suspension" unsprung.
?–1904	Traveller	4 hp De Dion single 500 cc			Quadricycle type. Swing-seat tonneau. Wheel steering. Rear "suspension" unsprung.
1903–1908	7	Flat twin 7 hp			Rear-engined. Four-seater. Although not put into production until 1903 this car had actually been shown at the 1900 National Show. Described as being of "novel construction" with a mixed shaft, gear and belt transmission, combined with great inefficiency.
1903–1907	7	6.5 hp single (7 hp)			Shaft drive
1906-1907	8	eight hp single 1173 cc	114.3 mm x 114.3 mm	1,829 mm (72.0 in) on request 1,981 mm (78.0 in)	Shaft drive
1905	10	10 hp twin 1448 cc	95.25 mm x 101.6 mm	1,829 mm (72.0 in) on request 1,981 mm (78.0 in)	Three speed gearbox. Shaft drive.
1906–1913	Model 02; Model 221; Model 222; Model 223; Model 40; 10/12	1629 cc twin	95.25 mm x 114.3 mm	2,438 mm (96.0 in)	Three- (early) or four-speed gearbox. Shaft drive. Van version from 1906.
1906	16	3402 cc pair-cast four-cylinder			
1906–1911	20/25	3261 cc four-cylinder			Chassis also used with chain drive for a 1-ton commercial vehicle.
1908-12	Model 19; Model 191; Model 18; Model 181; Model 31; Model 614; Model 41; Model 35; 14/18	3077 cc four-cylinder	95.25 mm x 107.95 mm	2,743 mm (108.0 in)	
1911-	Expressodel	7/8 hp			Tri-van. Chain drive.
1911-14	Model 130; Model 230; Model 330; 30/35	3670 cc six-cylinder	82.55 mm x 114.3 mm	3,200 mm (126.0 in)	Compressed air starter from 1911.
1912-16	Model 112; Model 212; Model 312; Model 412; Model 512; 12/14	2201 cc four-cylinder	76.2 mm x 120.65 mm	2,743 mm (108.0 in)	
1912-16	Model 116; Model 216; Model 316; Model 416; Model 516; 16/20	3012 cc four-cylinder	85.82 mm x 130.175 mm	2,896 mm (114.0 in)	
1912-16	Model 125; Model 225; Model 325; Model 425; Model 525; Model 42; 25/30	4221 cc four-cylinder	101.6 mm x 130.175 mm	2,896 mm (114.0 in)	Chassis also used with Chan drive for a 2-ton commercial vehicle.
1912	Model 403; Model 405; 30/40				Truck 3 t, Truck 5 t
1913-14	Midget	990 cc V twin			Cyclecar. Van version in 1912.
1914	8/10 (Light Four)	1094 cc four-cylinder			Bullnosed radiator

== Tractor Models ==
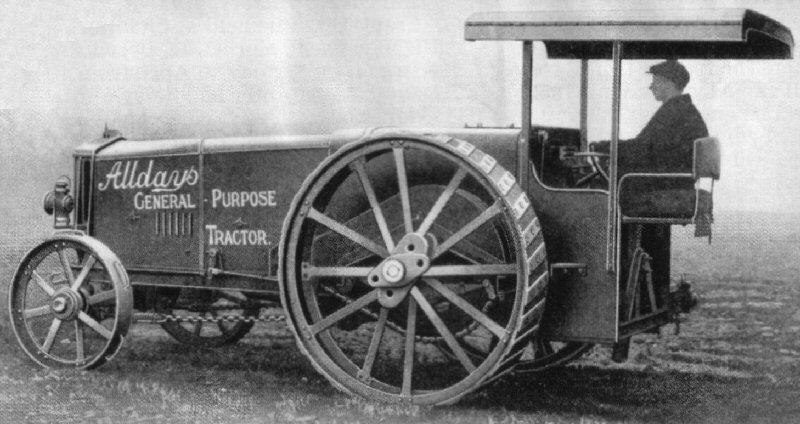
Alldays General Purpose Tractor, built 1917–1918)

- The Alldays General Purpose Tractor - only a couple of examples survive in the UK of this early internal-combustion-engined model. The tractor had advanced features such as sprung axles, enclosed engine and a basic canopy for the operator.

== See also ==
- List of British cars
- List of former tractor manufacturers
- List of car manufacturers of the United Kingdom
