= Ascot (1904 automobile) =

The 1904 Ascot was an English automobile manufactured for one year only; its 3½hp engine was equipped with a "patented method for mechanically controlling valves, doing away with useless pinions and calves."

It had no connection with the 1914 Ascot or the 1928 Ascot car maker.

== See also ==
- List of car manufacturers of the United Kingdom
