= Hungarian General Machine Factory =

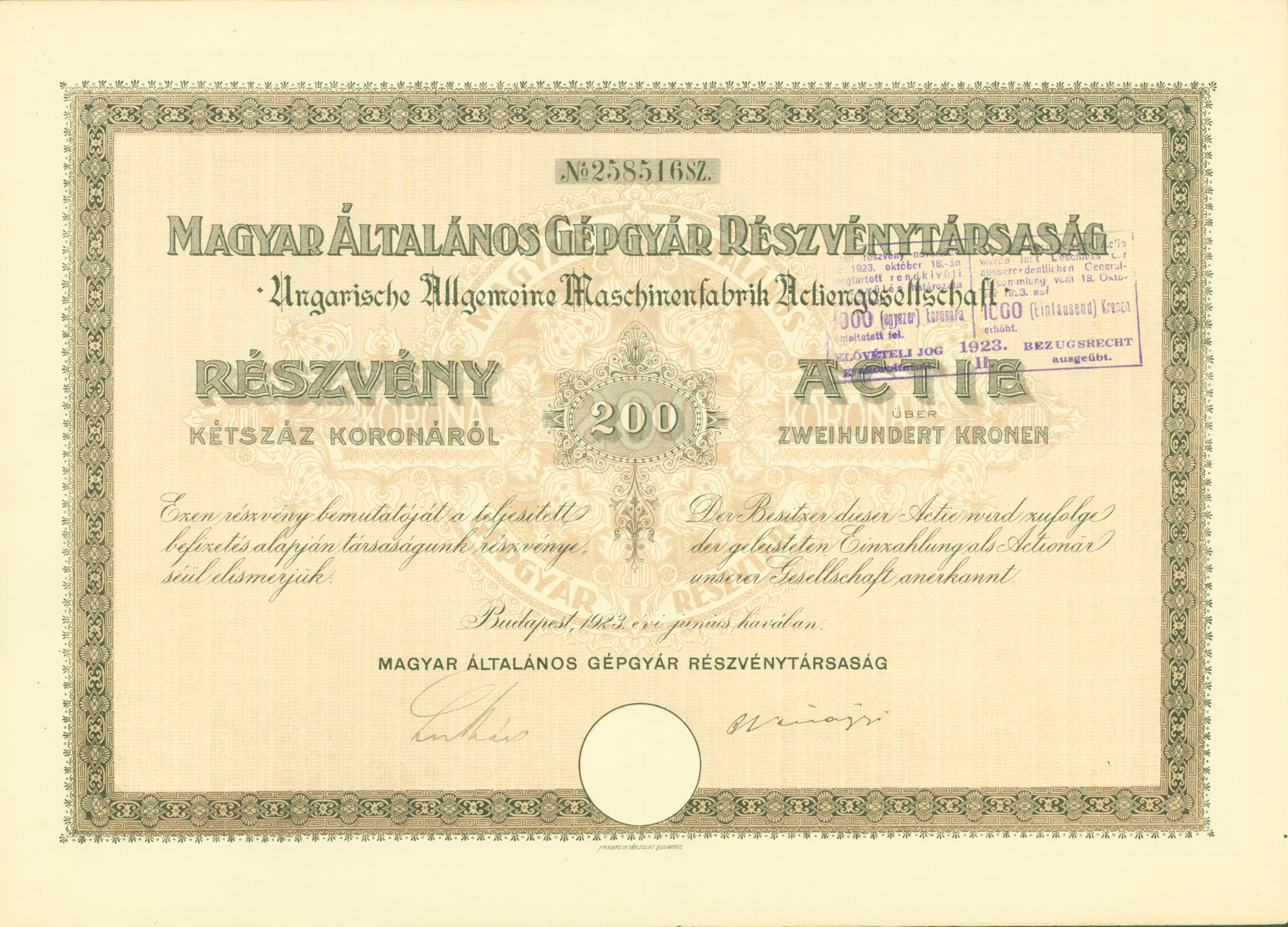
Share of the Hungarian General Engine Works Company Limited, issued June 1923

MÁG stands for "Magyar Általános Gépgyár Rt" (Hungarian General Engine Works Company Limited). It was the most prevalent Hungarian vehicle manufacturer before World War II, and was based in Budapest. Its roots date back to 1901, when Podvinecz & Heisler (a company created by two young entrepreneurs, 25-year-old Dániel Podvinecz and 24-year-old Vilmos Heisler), started assembling Austrian Leesdorfer cars - themselves being French Amédée Bollée cars built under license.

More successful was their later Phönix model, a German Cudell model built under license. The company was reorganised in 1912 and the automobile manufacturing division became the Magyar Általános Gépgyár Rt in 1913. Production was boosted by orders from the Post, the Army and other organisations – and outperforming other Hungarian manufacturers, including Röck, Rába, MARTA etc.- as the government tried to support local industry. MÁG introduced several models, designed by János Csonka, Jenő (Eugene) Fejes and other talented engineers.

== Beginnings ==
During its existence, the Hungarian General Engineering Works (MÁG) has grown to become perhaps the best-known car manufacturer in Hungary. In the early days, it was perhaps Vilmos Heisler who persuaded his partner to try his hand at producing a new type of transport vehicle, the automobile, which was almost unknown in Hungary.

On 15 September 1884, Dániel Podvinecz and Vilmos Heisler opened their business under the name of "Mechanical Engineering and Mechanical Agents" at Váczi körút 16, 3rd floor, 70, in the V. district of Budapest. Born in the countryside, they noticed the shortage of machinery and spare parts in agriculture, especially in small farms. At first they dealt with grinders and threshing machine parts, but soon they were dealing with larger machines. They supplied drive belts, gears, small axles, machined parts, etc. to the millers who came to them. In the 1890s, the Hungarian government extended its industrial development benefits to small industries, cottage industries and cooperatives. Thus, on 15 May 1892, they redeemed their 'factory' industrial certificates, iron steel maker No 12079 and machine repairer No 12080, and moved their company to Botond Street 7, 6th district. In addition to trading, selling new parts they had made themselves proved to be an increasingly better business. On 13 August 1895, at their request to install the parts or the equipment they had manufactured in the mills themselves, the Trade and Exchange Court, as a Company Court, registered the company under the name of Budapest Mill Construction and Machine Works. New industrial developments by the government led to an increase in demand for internal combustion engines, which attracted the attention of Podvinecz and Heisler. However, their Botond Street plant proved too small and they looked for a larger one where they could expand their factory. This is how they came to be on the then outer Váci út, where they took over a 3,810 square metre site, which was divided into two equal parts and registered in their name on 26 October 1900. On 14 February 1901, the VI. district magistrate's office certified that the "Podvinecz and Heisler factory owners were engaged in the manufacture of mill construction goods and machinery in their factory at 141 Váczi Street" and from 21 March their company was known as Budapest Mill Construction and Machine Works, Podvinecz and Heisler. They had a very wide range of products, which easily got them through the economically critical times, but they could not switch to mass production, everything was produced individually by hand.

In 1904, the company bought the entire equipment of the Leesfeld car factory near Baden and moved it to its Budapest plant, and soon afterwards the salvaged stock of the burnt down German Cudell car factory near Leesdorfer was also moved to the Váci út plant.

In the spring of 1905, at the 2nd Budapest International Motor Show, he presented his Phönix, a 4-seater car with a reclining engine, electric ignition and friction switch, and this Phönix, based on the Curdell licence, won the gold medal at the Bucharest International Fair. These first Podvinecz-Heisler automobiles retained the Phönix model name used by Cudell. The smallest of the first models was a two-cylinder model with 10 hp, while the larger four-cylinder engine was available in several versions (16/20 hp, 20/24 hp and 35/40 hp). Despite the success of the exhibition, the Phönix was not a great success with the public, as at the end of 1907 there were only 8 of them on Hungarian roads.

In 1906, when the Cudell parts ran out, the stocks of the Alba car factory in Trieste, which had been established in 1906 but had been liquidated in 1908 and belonged to the then Austro-Hungarian Monarchy, were bought up. The smaller 24 (18-24) horsepower model was sold as a passenger car, while the larger 45 (35-40) horsepower model with the Aster engine was sold as a bus and truck, also under the name of Phönix.

Dániel Podvinecz died in 1908, and after his death Vilmos Heisler ran the company alone for a time, then from 1911 with Géza Jalsoviczky, retired director of the Budapest State Higher Industrial School MAgomobil 1911 advertisement Magomobil Phoenix advertisement in 1911

In 1911, following the Austrian example, the Hungarian Ministry of War announced the "subsidy truck" program, under which buyers of trucks meeting military requirements were reimbursed by the state a part of the purchase price of the vehicle, in return for which they had to lend the truck for several military exercises (unfortunately, however, after the outbreak of World War I, their vehicles were simply confiscated). In order to expand the company, Heisler also took advantage of the state subsidy and agreed to the terms of the subsidy, which was that the automobile plant would be housed in completely separate workshops and would be commissioned by the end of November 1912 at the latest, kept in good working order and equipped to employ 80 workers. In addition, a separate trade mark would be registered for the factory, but only in Hungary. This latter clause of the undertaking led to the creation of the brand name MÁG.

On 4 July 1912, the company changed its name to Magyar Általános Gépgyár Részvénytársaság. The factory (still located at 141 Váci út in the VI. district) continued its previous business lines (milling machines, engines and steam engines), while the new automobile factory started operations in a newly equipped separate production plant..

== Automobile industry ==
To start automobile production, they won Jenő Fejes from the MARTA company in Arad, who was put in charge of the construction office.

By 1913, the first passenger car of their own design, a 25 horsepower, three-litre, 90/120 mm bore/stroke engine, was ready. Main features: - crankshaft with bearings in three places - high-voltage Bosch ignition magnet - single-disc dry clutch - suspension with semi-elliptic springs front and rear - solid or optionally wire wheels - overall length of chassis 4085 mm - wheelbase 3000 mm.

Nearly 50 examples of this successful carriage were made. Of course only the chassis, because the bodywork was built by other companies. In addition to the passenger cars, two-tonne lorries were also built - with their engines - to meet the subsidy requirements.

In the days preceding the outbreak of the First World War, the series production of a 50-unit mail collection van for the post office was also started, the plans for which were still being drawn up by János Csonka. After the outbreak of war, production of the carriages was stopped. The engines and components, which had already been produced, were incorporated into electric generators and other aggregators in wheeled and portable versions, at the request of the army.

== Aircraft industry ==
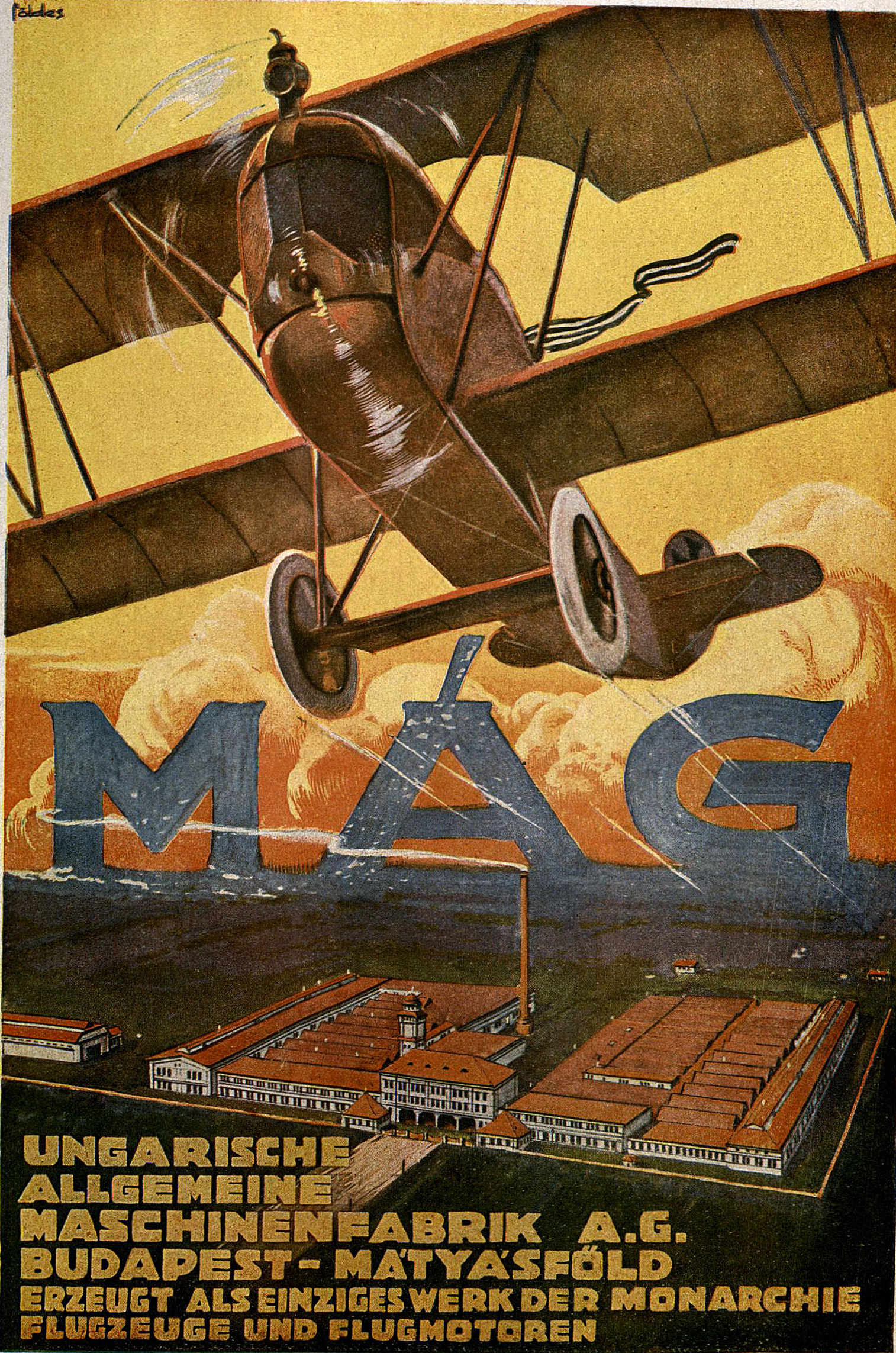
MÁG aeroplan and aeroengine factory advertisement

World War I brought new business for the company, as it produced airplane engines under Austro-Daimler license, as well as complete airplanes. The MÁG produced cars until 1915, when the company decided to build aircraft engines and aircraft to support the war efforts of the country. It established a big new aircraft factory at Mátyásföld.

Aircraft Engines
Serial number	Horsepower
16501	150 HP
17801	160 HP
18601	180 HP
19501	200 HP
24001	225 HP

== Interwar period ==
By 1920, the company had completely abandoned its old site on Váci út and moved to Mátyásföld.

In 1922, he bought all the shares and took over the Hungarian Fiat-müvek joint-stock company.

After the First World War, the company, owned by Camillo Castiglioni, owner of Austro-Daimler, resumed car production, as aircraft production could not be continued due to the peace treaty. Using the remaining chassis of a postal carriage started before the war, with a 60/100 mm bore/stroke and 10 hp engines, an old-new four-seater single-door model was launched, with the production of spare parts. However, in a country that had barely recovered from the war, there was little demand and a shortage of fuel, so, according to a report from 1925, only 150 cars were built in the MÁG workshops between the summer of 1923 and the summer of 1924, making it impossible to keep the business going, and MÁG cars were disproportionately expensive, with a MÁG touring car costing $850 in America, compared with the domestic price of $1,050.

In 1923, as a way out of this situation, the MÁG started to develop a model primarily for taxis. Jenő Böszörményi became technical director of MÁG from 1924 until 1931. He was responsible for the introduction of the Magomobil and Magosix models into series production. Production of the Magomobil and the Magotax, which specialised in taxis, began in 1925. The simple touring cars with four-cylinder engines were used by taxi drivers for decades, and after the Second World War, the Budapest taxi trade was initially started with Magotaxes. During 1925-1926, the Hungarian car market also began to recover. However, the Magomobil did not prove to be competitive: in 1927, for example, 2,602 cars were sold in Hungary, of which only 148 were made by MÁG. As a result, MÁG was constantly making losses. In the meantime, the six-cylinder Magosix was built in Mátyásföld, based on an American model and partly using American parts.

In the wake of the economic crisis of 1929, the Credit Bank started to liquidate MÁG. The sale of the stocks was transferred to the Hungarian General Credit Bank-owned Méray Motorcycle Works. During the liquidation process, several of the remaining Magosix chassis were built at Méray.

On 10 January 1933, all work at MÁG ceased and the decision was taken to sell off the production, equipment and movable property.

On 18 April 1941, at the conclusion of the closing general meeting, the Hungarian Machine Works Limited Company was dissolved.

=== Return to the car industry ===
After the war new car models appeared, including the Magomobil in 1924. By the mid-1920s it was apparent that MÁG is not competitive on the Hungarian market. Its financer and owner, the Hungarian General Credit Bank tried to find a buyer. In the meantime another new model, the Magosix was introduced with a 6-cylinder engine. It used many American parts to compete with the locally available American models but to no avail. The economic crisis of 1929 was the last straw, and the Bank pulled the plug. A total of 2000 passenger cars, 150 trucks and buses, as well as 1000 automobile engines had been produced.

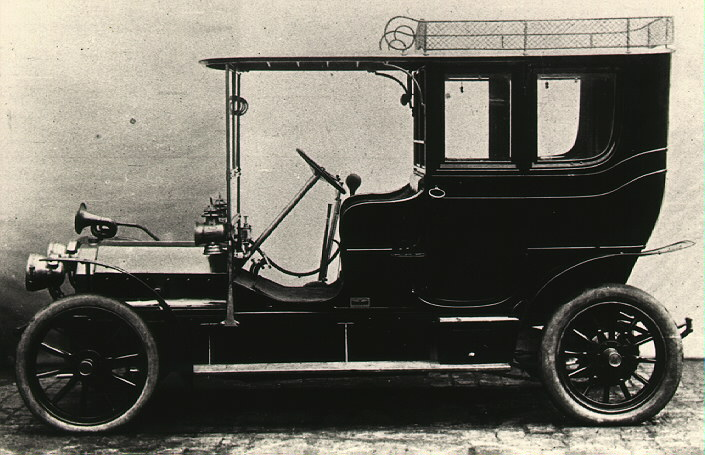
Magomobil phoenix car -1906

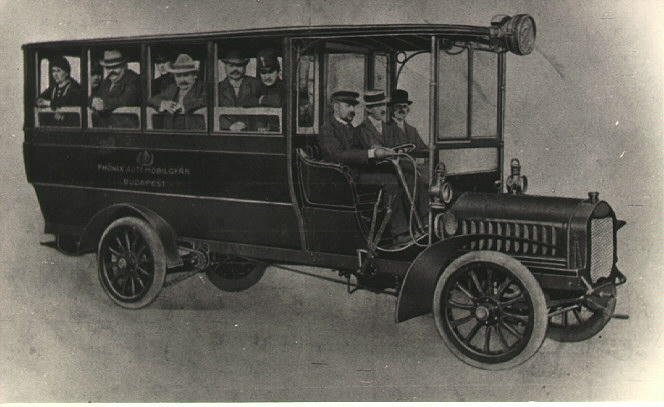
Magomobil phoenix Bus

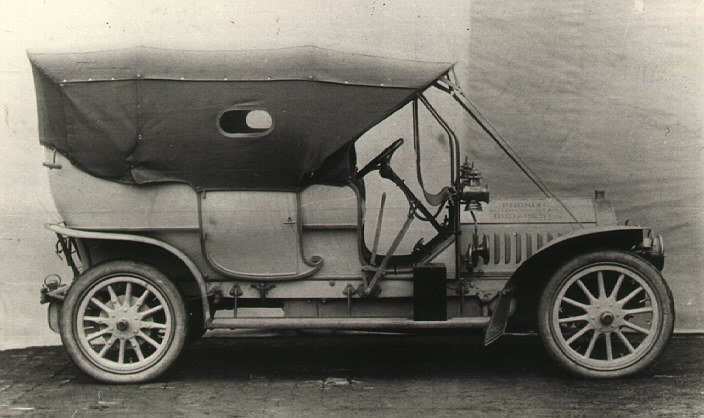
Magomobil phönix auto -1910

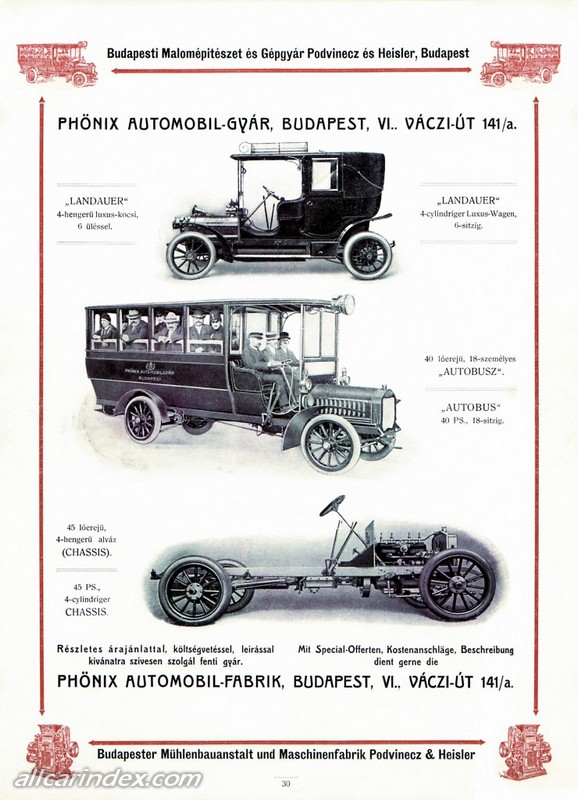
Magomobil Phoenix advertisement in 1911

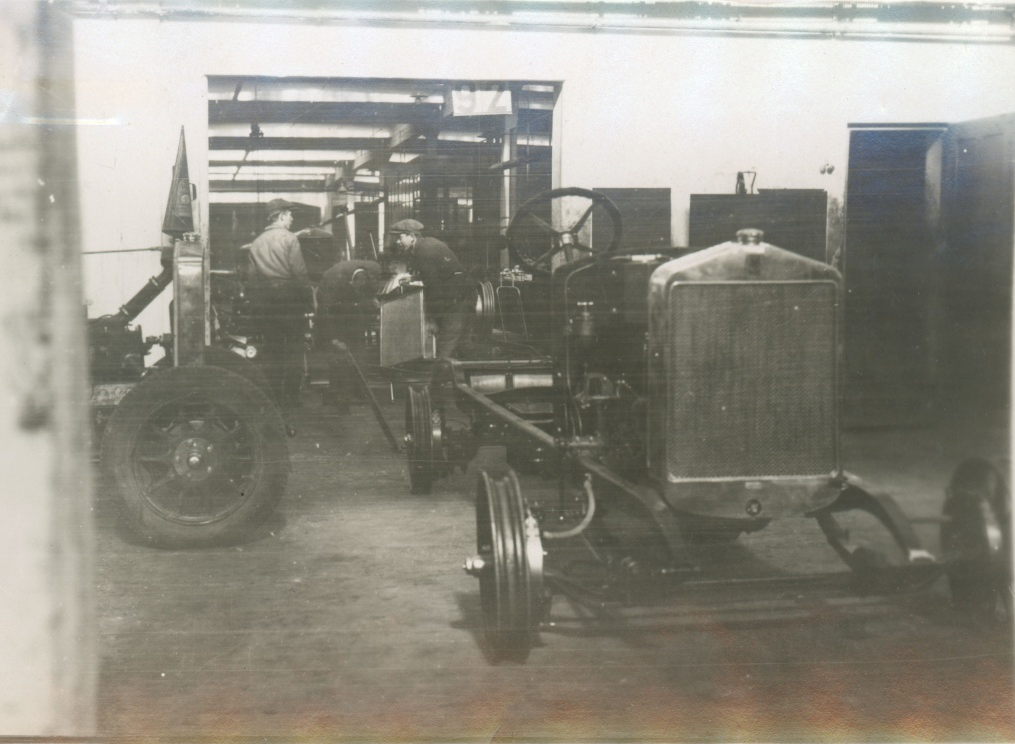
45HP Mag car under construction in 1912

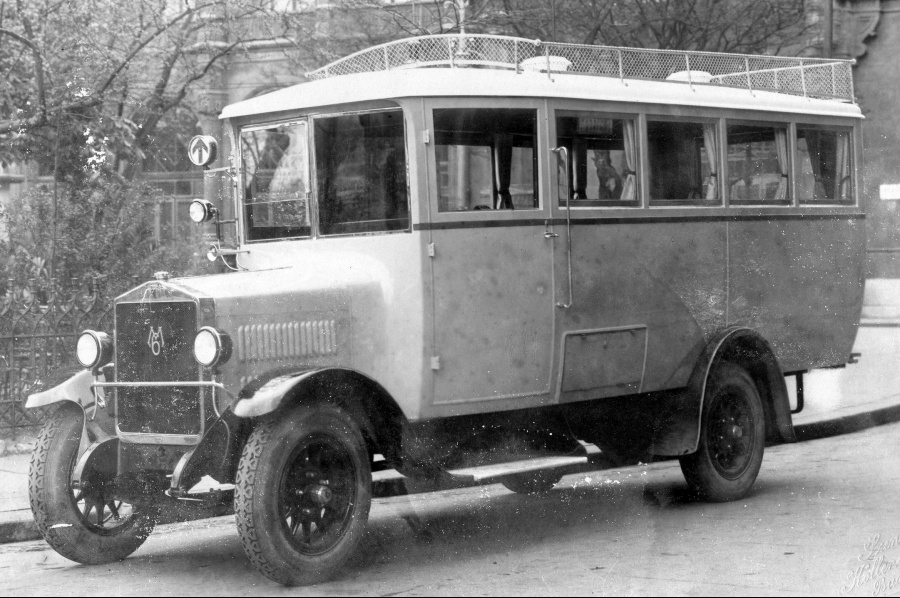
Mág Bus in Budapest in 1913

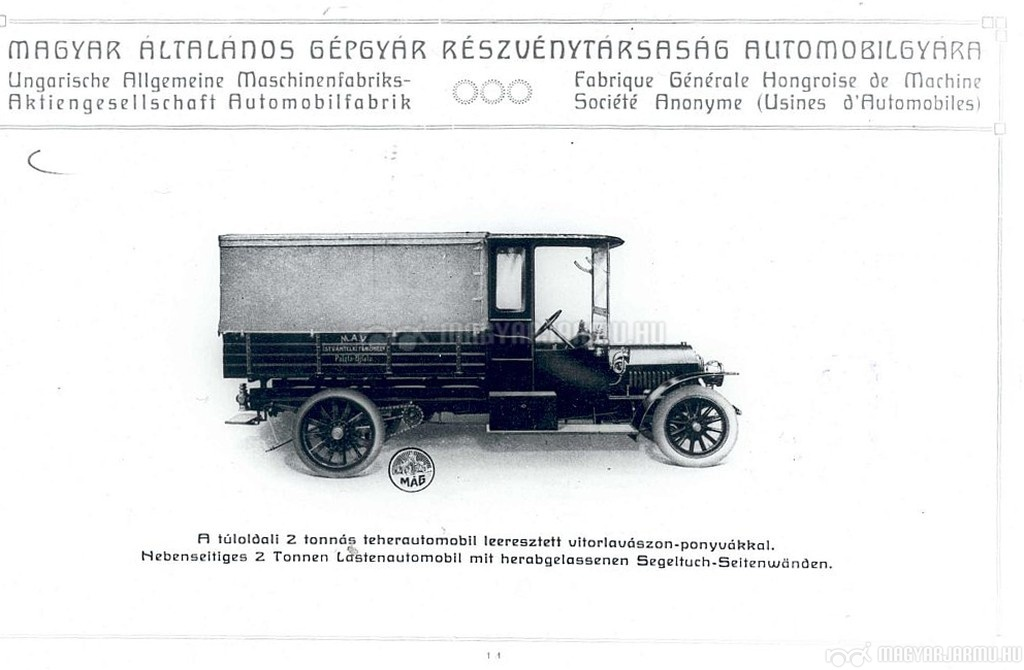
A Magomobil truck in 1914

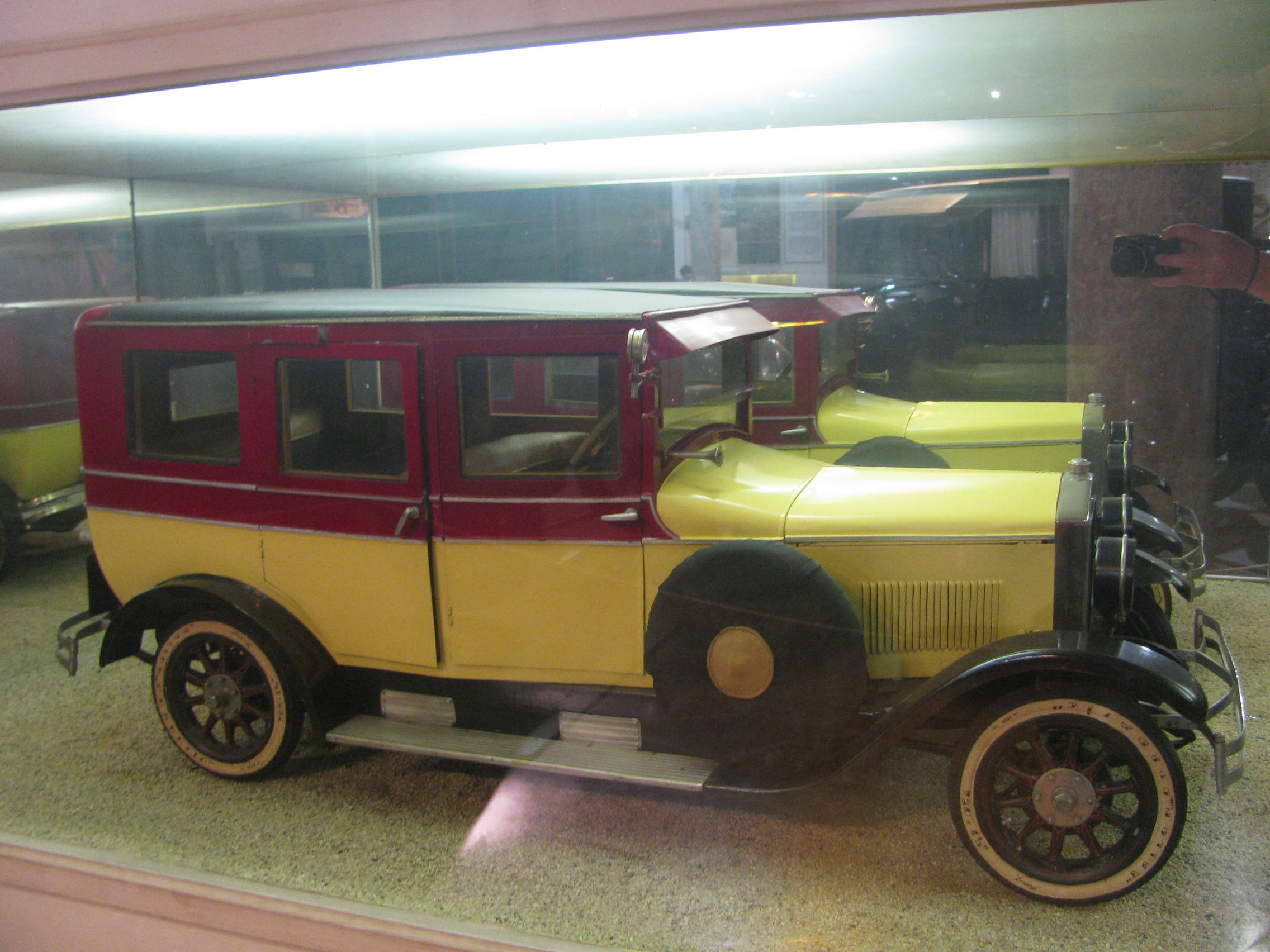
Magosix sport-touring car model, 1927

== Factory sites ==
=== Budapest, Váci way ===
The milling industry started manufacturing parts and equipment in 1892 at 7 Botond Street in District VI (from 1938 in District XIII). Soon, however, this site proved to be too small and they looked for a larger one where they could expand their factory. So, at the turn of the century, they moved to the then outer Váci út. Here, at 141 Váci út, they took over a 3,810 square metre site, divided into two equal parts, where they continued to manufacture millinery goods and machinery, adding petrol engines, and then in 1904 expanded their range to include automotive products. In 1910, a private locomotive with a 20-horsepower petrol engine of their own manufacture towed goods from the yard. The machine shop housed about 100 machine tools, large cylinder lathes, various lathes, grinding machines, milling machines and drilling machines, with an assembly section and experimental station at the rear of the machine shop. Immediately adjacent to the machine shop was a factory-built "compound condensation steam engine" which powered the entire plant. The separate carpenter's shop housed woodworking, milling machines, scrapers, planers, brushers, rollers, flat screens and crane cleaning machines. Also built in completely separate workshops and organisations were automobiles and high-speed 4-cylinder 60 hp petrol engines, which the factory supplied to a machinery factory in the lowlands to power soil cultivation machinery. There was also a warehouse, upholsterer, polisher and painter and a blacksmith's shop in the one-and-a-half-acre factory, which was already cramped at the time.

In 1917, the company moved its engine, automobile and aircraft manufacturing plants to Mátyásföld, and to continue its old plants producing steam engines and mill equipment on the outer Váci út, it formed a limited partnership, of which Sándor Heisler became a shareholder and the Hungarian General Engineering Works Ltd. became an outside shareholder.

=== Cinkota, Mátyásföld ===
In 1914, the Ministry of War commissioned the factory to produce aircraft engines, and by the end of 1916 it was the second most-employed industrial enterprise in the Monarchy, with Skoda Group joining the joint-stock company in 1915. Thus, in January 1916, the company purchased the Beniczky plot 142000 square between the so-called forest belt and the Crossroads road on the outskirts of Cinkota. Earlier that year the aircraft and the following year a much larger automobile factory was built. The whole investment cost 5 million Austro-Hungarian crowns (1.6 million crowns for the buildings and 2.4 million crowns for the machinery). The company applied for and received a 15-year tax exemption from the municipality of Cinkota. THE M. Á. G.'s capital increase also included the Schwerin-based Fokker aircraft company, which transferred its proven patents and models in exchange for shares of corresponding value.

Even though Mátyásföld was part of the administration of Cinkota until 1950, it is still referred to as Mátyásföld (the factory and the airport) bordering the southern edge of the Old Matyasland housing estate. The buildings of the Hungarian General Machine Factory - with a 39-metre-high water tower and a 30-metre-high factory chimney - were built on 10 hectares.

The siding of the Mátyásföld aircraft factory, branching off from the Cinkotai HÉV line, was completed in April 1916. The rest of the work was decided by tenders during the summer. The earthworks for the factory were awarded to Lord and his partner, the master builder's work to Dávid R. and his son, the reinforced concrete to István Pacher, the ironwork to Antal Oetl, the carpentry to Wellisch Náthán's successor, the slate roofing to the Újlak Brickworks, the skylights to Haas and Somogyi, the heating system to B. and E. Körbing, its plumbing and sewerage were built by Salamon Spitzer.

In October 1917, Archduke Joseph Ferdinand Habsburg, Inspector General of the Imperial and Royal Air Forces, visited the factory, which consisted of an engine factory, aircraft factory and airport, which switched completely to car production after the First World War.
