= Ascot (1928 automobile) =

The Ascot was an English automobile, the brainchild of Cyril Pullin (who also produced Ascot-Pullin motorcycles at the same time), that was manufactured between 1928 and 1930 in Letchworth, Hertfordshire. The factory had previously been used by Phoenix. The car was based largely on the Hungarian Fejes, with chassis and 10 hp engine assembled from welded steel pressings. The lack of castings was intended to keep the price low, at approximately 125 pounds, but due to lack of finance it never went into production.

A larger car, the Ascot Gold Cup Six with a 2423 cc six cylinder engine possibly made by Continental, 3-speed gearbox and servo brakes did become a reality and a few production cars were made. It was advertised as being available as a 2-seat sports, coupé or fabric saloon.

It had no connection with the 1904 Ascot or the 1914 Ascot car.

== See also ==
- List of car manufacturers of the United Kingdom
