= Ascot (finance) =

An ASCOT, or Asset Swapped Convertible Option Transaction, is an option on a convertible bond used to separate the cash flows of the underlying bond from the equity option embedded in the convert. Buyers of ASCOTs include fixed income portfolio managers and other investors that want exposure to the rate and credit risks of the convert issuer; cashflows from the convert would be passed through to these buyers. Sellers of ASCOTs typically include trading desks that want to retain exposure to the potentially lucrative equity optionality.

== External sources ==
http://moe.ecrc.nsysu.edu.tw/English/workshopE/2006/2006-A4-6.pdf
