= Enfield-Allday =

British car manufacturer

The Enfield-Allday was an English car manufactured in Sparkbrook, Birmingham, from 1919 to 1924. The marque was created from the merged ranges of Alldays & Onions and Enfield and the Enfield Autocar Co Ltd.

== History ==
Prior to World War I Alldays & Onions had produced a range of cars and in 1908 took over the short lived Enfield Autocar Company based in Redditch which had been formed to take over the car making interests of the Enfield Cycle Company. The Enfield designed cars were phased out before World War I leaving them as badge engineered Alldays. Following the armistice in 1918 the companies were rationalised and in 1919 became Enfield-Allday Motors Ltd based in Sparkbrook.

All the old designs were dropped and a new 10 hp car called the Bullet was designed by A. W. Reeves who had been at Crossley Motors. This radical design had an air cooled, five cylinder, sleeve valve, radial engine of 1247 cc mounted at the front of a tubular steel lattice frame. The drive to the rear wheels was via an inclined shaft to a central 3 speed gearbox and then another shaft to the rear axle. Suspension was by transverse cantilever springs. A three-seat body was fitted. When announced a price of £295 was advertised but by the time the car was exhibited later in the year at the London Motor Show this had risen to £350. A. C. "Gus" Bertelli of the Grahame-White Aviation company was called in to give an opinion on the car and reported that a lot of development was required and the price was uneconomic and should be raised to £550. This was too much for the market and probably only 5 reached customers.

A 15 hp sleeve valve car with a six cylinder in-line engine had also been announced but it seems never to have reached production.

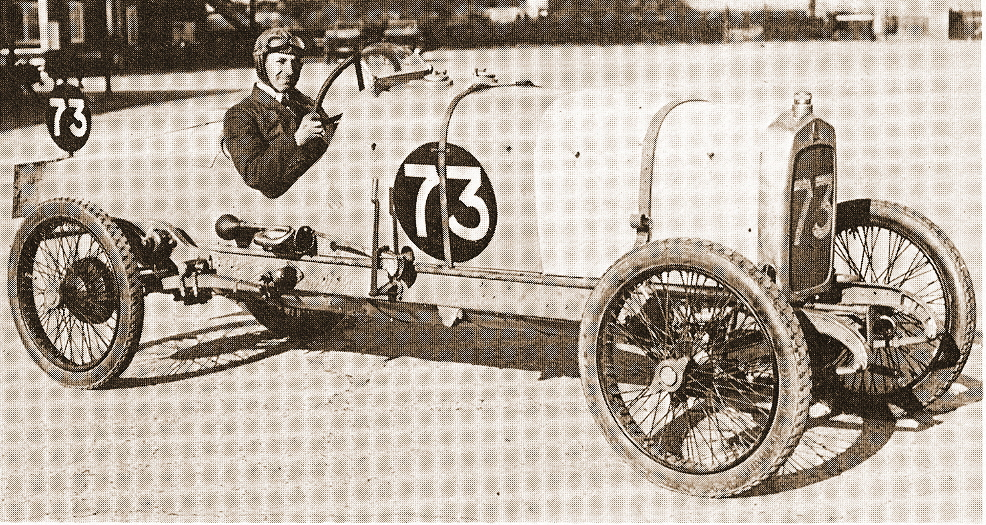
Enfield-Allday 10/20 based racing car

With a great deal of money spent on development and no sales to show for it something had to be done quickly and Bertelli was appointed Works Manager. He designed a conventional car with an in-line four cylinder 1488 cc engine with three speed transmission which was launched as the 10/20 hp. The coachwork was built by Gus's brother Enrico "Harry" Bertelli who would later built bodies for Aston Martin. An entry was made in the 1924 Tourist trophy race without success. The car was however too expensive with a chassis-only price of £500 and complete cars from £575. In 1923 the engine was enlarged to 1750 cc and a four speed gearbox fitted and the name changed to the 12/30 at a lower price of £450. Only about 100 cars were made before the company went into liquidation in January 1923. (Note: The liquidator offered the goodwill, tools and finished and unfinished parts for the following motor vehicles: Enfield Allday 10/20 touring car 12/30 touring car (new Model) 10/30 sports model car 25/30 2=ton lorry Chassis only Allday 8/10 12/14 16/20 25/30 2-ton lorry and tractor 3-ton lorry and charabanc 5-ton lorry source=The Manchester Guardian 07 July 1923: 4. Chassis only Enfield 8/10 14.3 18.3 24.8)

This was not the end as the company was re-organised and moved to smaller premises in Small Heath, Birmingham from where the 12/30 was offered with a very wide range of coachwork from the Warwick 2-seater at £575 up to the Hereford limousine at £720 and Stratford saloon at £795. Before the new range could get established, even if they could be sold at the very high prices, parent company Alldays & Onions collapsed in 1924. Both companies were resurrected with Enfield-Allday becoming Alldays Motor Repair Ltd but no more cars were made.
