= Ascot-Pullin Motorcycles =

Historical motorcycle manufacturer

Ascot Motor & Manufacturing Co
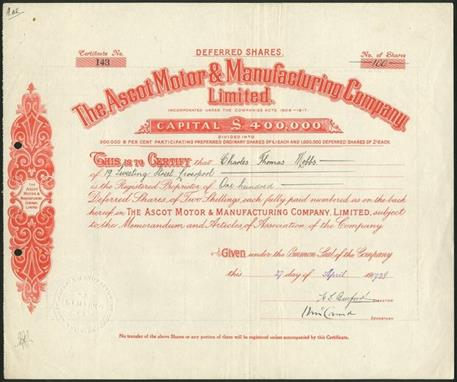
- Share certificate issued on 4 April 1928
- Company type: Limited
- Industry: Motorcycle design and manufacturing
- Founded: 1928; 98 years ago in Letchworth, UK
- Founder: Cyril Pullin
- Defunct: 1930
- Fate: Liquidation
- Headquarters: Pixmore Avenue and Dunhams Lane, Letchworth SG6, UK
- Products: Motorcycles
- Production output: c. 400-500 motorcycles (1928-1930)
- Brands: Ascot-Pullin
- Owner: Cyril Pullin

Ascot-Pullin Motorcycles was a British motorcycle manufacturer founded by Cyril Pullin as the Ascot Motor & Manufacturing Co Ltd. at Letchworth, Hertfordshire in 1928. An inventor and winner of the 1914 Isle of Man TT, Pullin had been developing ideas for motorcycle designs since 1920 with Stanley Groom, and had patented a two-stroke engine motorcycle with pressed sheet metal frame and forks. After leaving Douglas the first time, Pullin worked with Groom again to refine his ideas and develop and patent the Ascot-Pullin motorcycle. Fewer than 500 were built and sales were poor, resulting in the company's liquidation in 1930.

== Ascot-Pullin 500 ==
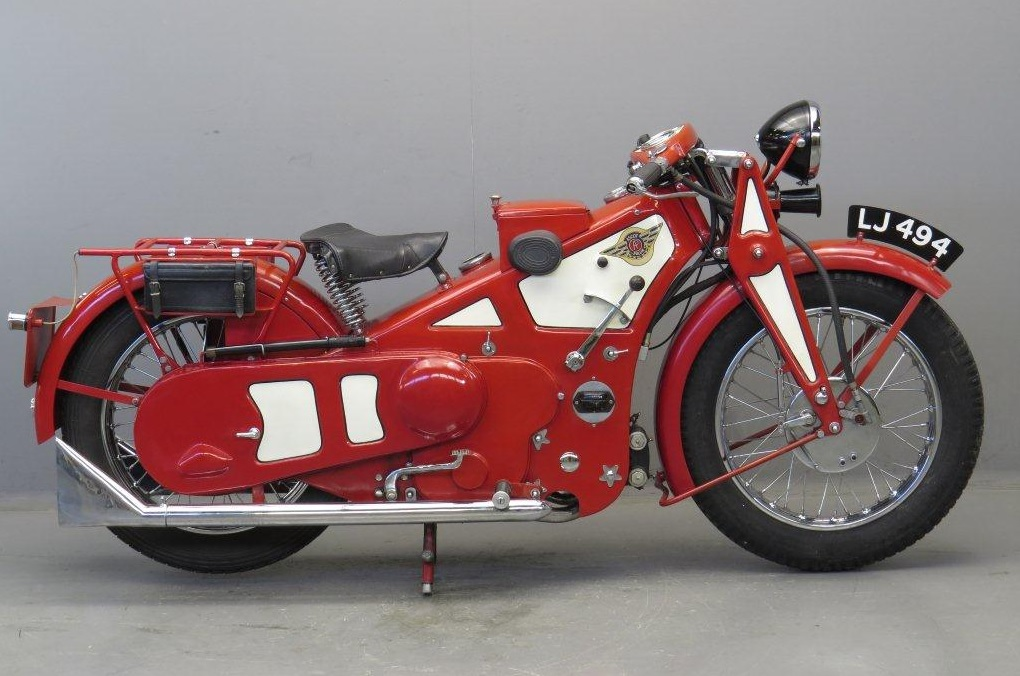
Ascot-Pullin 1929 500 cc 1 cyl OHV

Pullin was an innovator and the Ascot-Pullin 500 OHV single had the engine horizontally mounted and enclosed with a pressed-steel frame. As well as the first use of hydraulic brakes on a motorcycle, Pullin also designed a telescopic centre stand and an adjustable windshield with a windscreen wiper and rear-view mirror, as well as a fully enclosed chain and interchangeable wheels.

== Powerwheel ==
The Ascot-Pullin name was revived in 1951 by the Hercules Cycle and Motor Company, a division of Tube Investments, who commissioned Pullin's new invention, the "Powerwheel", a 40 cc (2.4 cu in), 0.7 hp (0.52 kW), single-cylinder rotary engine. The prototypes were scrapped after the company decided not to proceed with production, but a sectionalised example survived together with most of the drawings, and an industrialised version was developed for the Ministry of Supply.
