= Puli (car) =

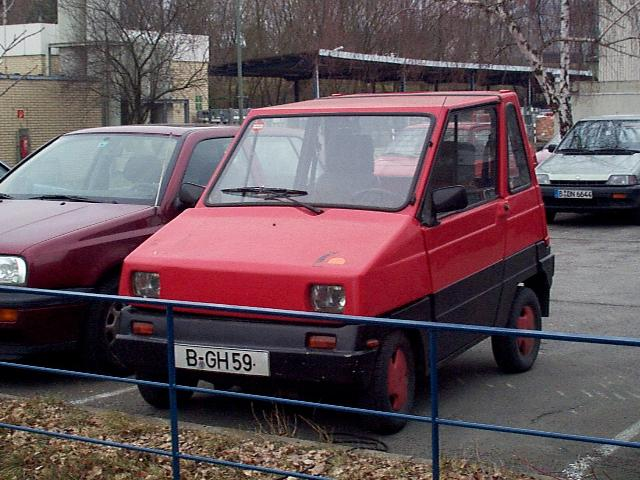

Overview
- Type: microcar
- Manufacturer: HÓDGÉP Kft.
- Also called: Puli Pinguin
- Model years: 1986–1998
- Assembly: Hódmezővásárhely, Hungary
- Designer: Tibor Szolár

Body and chassis
- Layout: FF
- Doors: 3
- Chassis: Unibody

Powertrain
- Engine: 273 cc Yanmar Diesel engine; Electric motor
- Power output: Diesel engine: 4 kW (5.5 HP); Electric motor: 7.4 kW (9.9 HP)
- Transmission: continuously variable
- Battery: (on electric model) 10, 6V lead-acid batteries, total capacity: 240 Ah

Dimensions
- Length: 2680 mm
- Width: 1480 mm
- Height: 1420 mm
- Curb weight: 350 kg

The Puli was a microcar made in Hungary by HÓDGÉP of Hódmezővásárhely in 1986.

The car was 2.46 m long and was assembled using parts made by Ikarus, Škoda, Lada and Polski Fiat, which were available at that time in the country. It was powered by a Diesel engine producing 4 kW, or an electric motor producing 7.4 kW.

The body was made from reinforced glass fibre, and was intended to be exported mainly to France where no driving licence was needed to drive that category of vehicles. The company's profile was agricultural machinery building and did not survive the political-economical transition of Hungary to a market economy at the end of the 1980s.

The electric version was produced in 1991 under the name Puli Pinguin 4.

In 2006, the Puli returned under the ownership of Gábor Prokop. Prokop holds the Puli and Wartburg trade marks.

== See also ==
- Puli (dog breed)
