= Ascott (surname) =

Ascott is a surname. Notable people with the surname include:

- Les Ascott (1921–2013), Canadian football player
- Roy Ascott (born 1934), British artist
- Shirley Ascott (1930–1995), British sprint canoer
- Percelle Ascott (born 1993), Zimbabwean-English actor

== See also ==
- Scott (surname)
