= Credo BC 11 =

Credo BC11
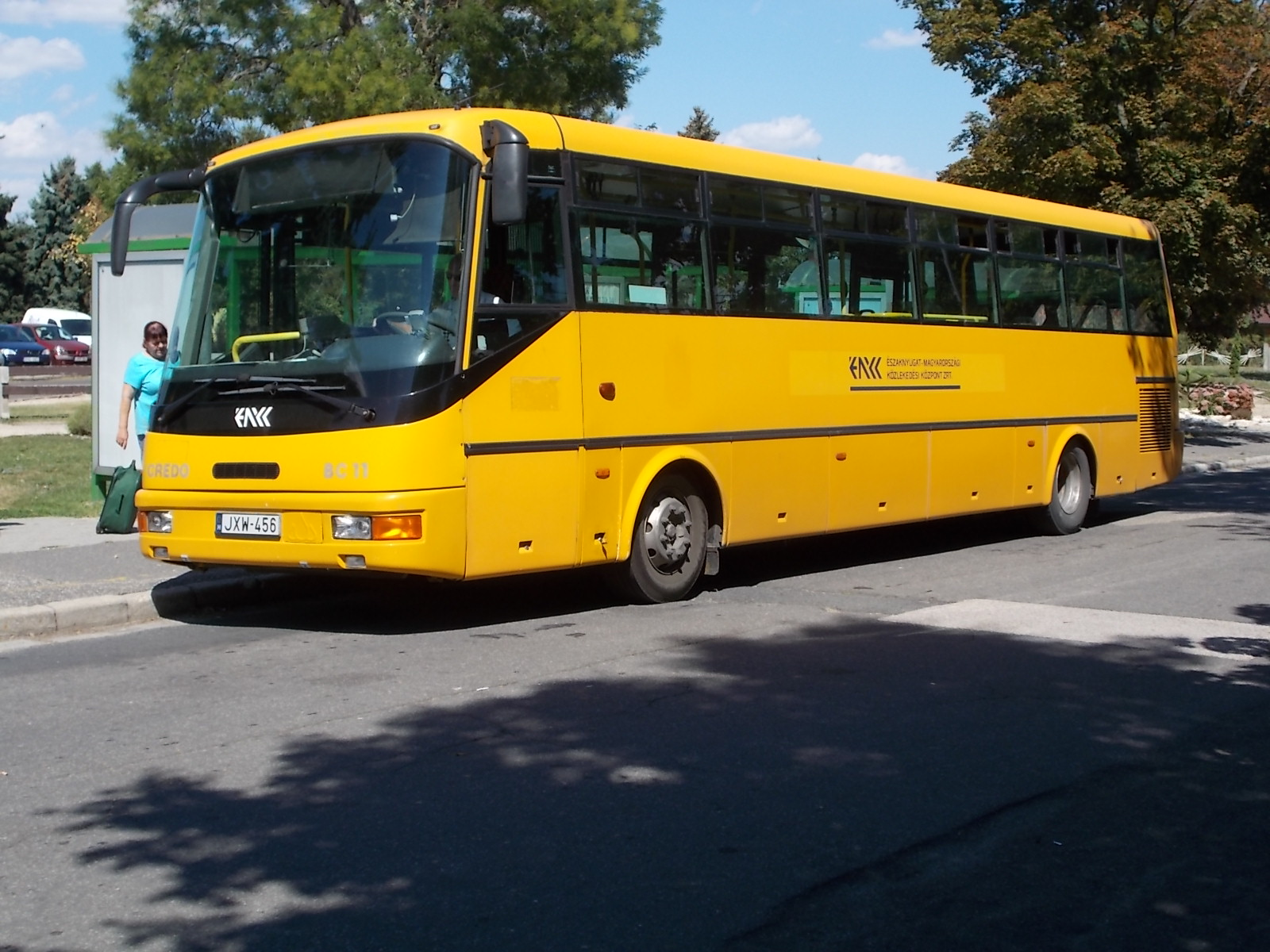

Overview
- Manufacturer: Kravtex, Győr
- Model years: 2002—2007

Powertrain
- Engine: IVECO F4AE0682C

Dimensions
- Length: 10'670
- Width: 2'520
- Height: 3'300
- Kerb weight: 7'550

Credo BC 11 is of Hungarian minibus production from 1999 to 2001 with a length of 9.5 m and 10.7 m. Buses were equipped with 176 kW Iveco Tector engines. They had drum brakes of the Rába 501 type at the front of the vehicle and the Rába 106 at the rear. There was no low-floor version of these buses. The bus is very similar to the Credo EC 11 type bus, both externally and internally. It differs only in the number of doors. There are one single-leaf door in the front and rear of the vehicle and one double-leaf door in the middle of the vehicle.

== Description ==
The body of the bus is panel and semi-self-supporting, its skeleton is made of steel and is welded to the bus chassis. There is one single-leaf door in the front and rear of the vehicle and one double-leaf door in the middle of the vehicle for boarding and alighting passengers, which are also used for boarding with stroller or wheelchair. The door operates on a pneumatic drive from ISAF. The interior of the bus is covered with a non-slip floor. Ventilation is provided by ceiling fans and heating by hot water radiators.

All vehicles have the BUSE information system installed to report stops with a red LED display. The first three series of this bus were equipped with a digital clock in the driver's cab, but their time was distorted, as the clock was not connected to the on-board computer. Since the fourth series, all buses have been equipped with yellow bands in the front of the bus, which defined the forbidden space for passengers to stay. Since the sixth series, all buses have been equipped with a stop reporting system. From the seventh series, the buses began to be equipped with another folding seat in place for a stroller.
