= Ascot (1914 automobile) =

The Ascot was a 1914 Anglo-French light automobile made by Buchet for Hollingdrake Automobile Company of Stockport, England. It was priced at £195.

Hollingdrake fitted their own bodies, mainly being two-seaters and coupes. The engine was a 10 hp side-valve with the gearbox in unit with it.
