= Fejes =

The Fejes was a Hungarian automobile, a utility vehicle manufactured in Budapest between 1923 and 1932 to a design by automotive engineer Jenő Fejes (1877–1951) by Fejes Lemezmotor és Gépgyár Rt. The entire car, including the 1244 cc ohv engine, was constructed of welded and pressed iron. Several were purchased by the Hungarian Post Office. The model range consisted of three four-cylinder and one six-cylinder type. Production ended after about 45 cars were made following financial problems and a request for a government loan failed.

Plans to build it in England by the Fejes Patents Syndicate Ltd under the name Ascot came to nothing.
