= Brandvlei =

Town in Northern Cape, South Africa

- Location within Northern Cape Location within South Africa
- Coordinates: 30°27′48″S 20°29′10″E
- Country: South Africa
- Province: Northern Cape
- District: Namakwa
- Municipality: Hantam
- Established: 1862

Area
  - Total: 29.25 km^{2} (11.29 sq mi)
- Elevation: 922 m (3,025 ft)

Population (2011)
  - Total: 2,859
  - Density: 97.74/km^{2} (253.2/sq mi)

Racial makeup (2011)
  - Black African: 4.3%
  - Coloured: 89.9%
  - Indian/Asian: 0.5%
  - White: 5.0%
  - Other: 0.3%

First languages (2011)
  - Afrikaans: 94.9%
  - Sign language: 2.4%
  - Xhosa: 1.3%
  - Other: 1.5%
- Time zone: UTC+2 (SAST)
- Postal code (street): 8915
- PO box: 8915
- Area code: 054

Brandvlei is a small town in the Karoo region of the Northern Cape, South Africa. This is where a 19th-century trekboer called Ou Brand settled. Brand camped at this spot at the Sakrivier, a dry river bed, which only occasionally had water after good rains – and which typically result in flash floods. The settlement was cut in two by such a flood in 1961. After it was recovered, a municipality was formed in 1962.

This Brandvlei is located in the Bushmanland, also known as the Thirst Land, Dorsland in Afrikaans and should not be confused with the Brandvlei south of Worcester in the Western Cape. From 1974 until 2005 it was the location of an entire Long Range Artillery Battalion of the SADF, co-located with a Helicopter Transport Squadron and a Ground Attack Jet Squadron of the SAAF

This area was once sub-tropical, during the Middle Miocene period (16 to 11.6 million years ago) evident from fossils found in the area.

Notable Fossil study in and around Brandvlei :

Remnants of Cainozoic fluvial deposits occur along the northerly flowing Sak River in Bushmanland, between Brandvlei and Sak River Station. The terraces can be subdivided into older and younger deposits, and occur approximately 60m and between 20m and 30m above the present-day river respectively. Most of the older ‘terraces' are either hill-slope deposits or fans, and represent reworked fluvial sediments. A rounded vertebrate bone and several pieces of sub-rounded fossil-wood were found in these deposits, which indicate a mid Miocene age (16 to 11.6 million years ago) for the original older deposits. Some of the fossil-wood samples have been positively identified as extant angiospermous families. Both the vertebrate fossil and the wood suggest that the mid Miocene climate was subtropical. At the end of the Miocene the wet period changed to arid conditions, and mature calcretes developed.

Brandvlei fossil research: Location map of study area. DD = DikDoorns, NK = Nelskop, PK = Paardekalk, PLV = Piet Louws Vlei, TR = Twee Rivieren, SK = Swartkop, KV = Koa Valley, CPV = Commissioners Pan Valley, GV = Geelvloer Valley.

Brandvlei fossil research: Locality plan of Brandvlei Cainozoic deposits and palaeo-Sak River drainage. DD = Dik Doors, NK = Nelskop, PK = Paardekalk, PLV = Piet Louws Vlei, TR = Twee Riviere, SK = Swartkop, GV = Geelvloer Valley, CPV = Commissioners Pan Valley, KV = Koa Valley.

Agriculture:

From 1910, farmers used an irrigation method comparable to one used for thousands of years by the Egyptians. The terrain is very flat causing water to collect in shallow pools. This way the rainwater is spread over a larger area and are allowed to sink into the soil. The limited ground moisture is enough to farm small-scale crops that sustain farmers once the rain has stopped. In the long run this method is not feasible, as evaporating water leaves behind salt and other minerals. Today this method is no longer used.

This region contains very little vegetation, consisting mostly of shrubs and yellow grass among an arid landscape. During the rainy season the shallow pans attract flocks of birds. Temperatures above 40°C is common in the summer.

== Activities ==
- Birdlife

The salt pans are renovated into bird sanctuaries after the summer rains.

- Dutch Reformed Church

Visit the old Dutch Reformed Church, in Neo-Gothic style.

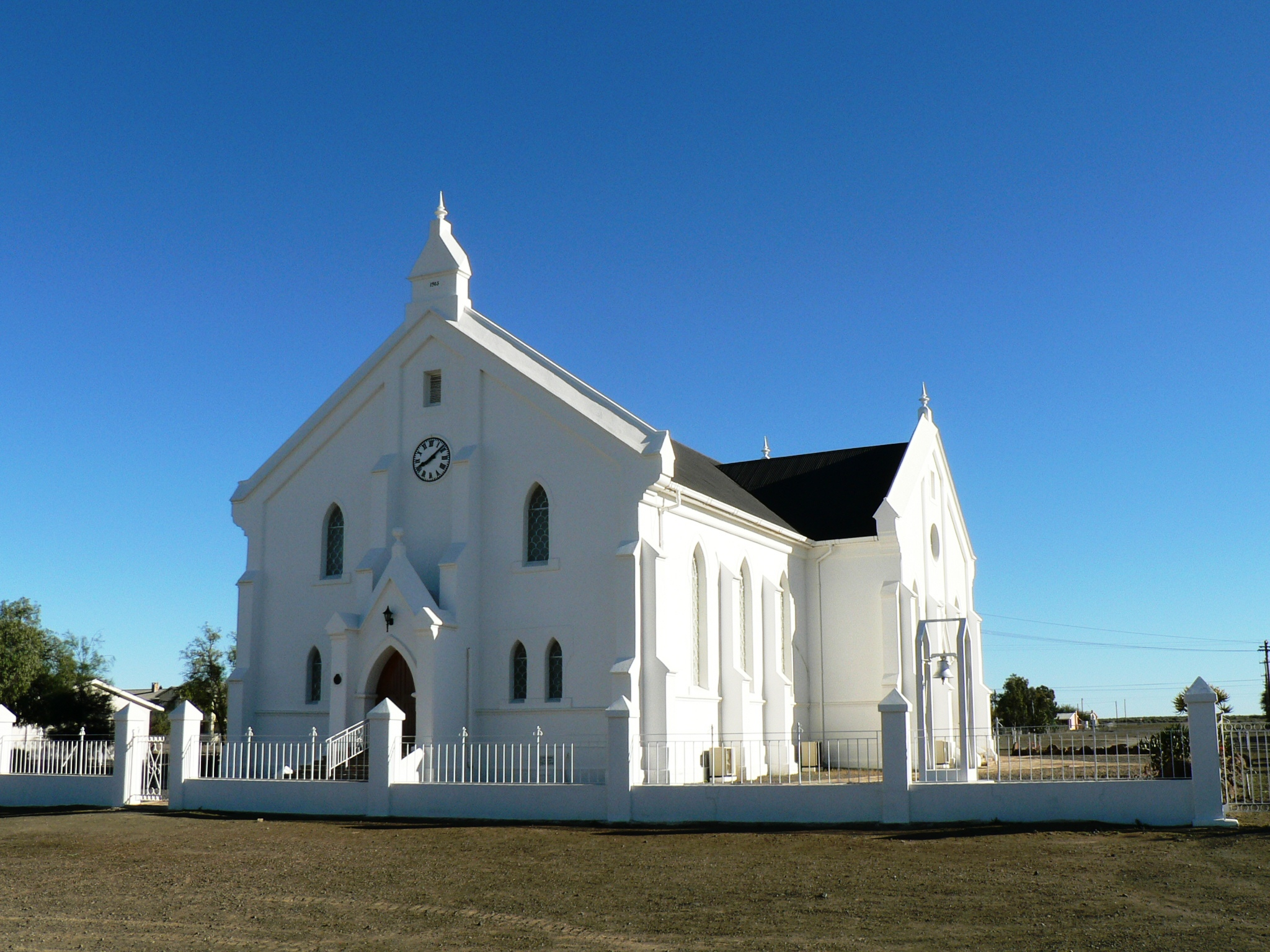
Dutch Reformed Church

- Lekkerlê and Kans

Two farms exhibiting splendid displays of San rock engravings.

- Verneukpan

In 1929, Sir Malcolm Campbell unsuccessfully attempted to break the world land-speed record here by travelling over 300 mph in his Napier-Campbell Blue Bird.

- Paragliding

In 1993 the record set for greatest gain in height was set in Brandvlei (4526m). The Karoo area is very thermic and has claimed multiple paragliding world records over the years.

== See also ==
- Kenhardt, Northern Cape
- List of cities and towns in the Northern Cape
- Northern Cape
- Verneukpan
