= Kenhardt =

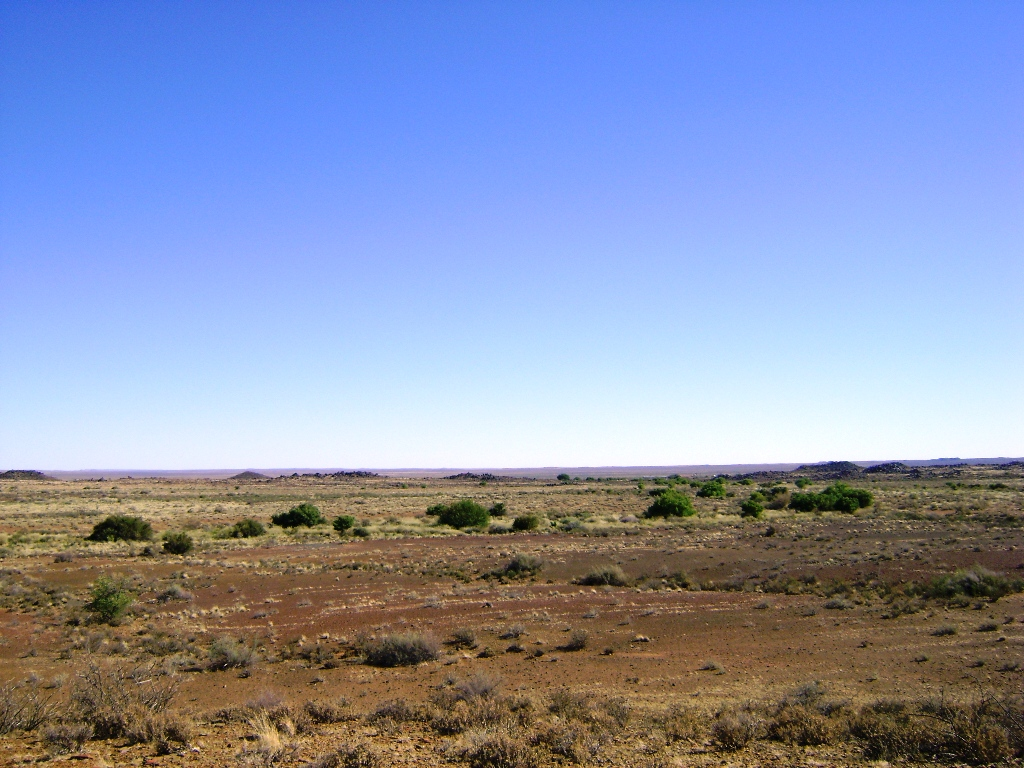
- Farm in the Kenhardt area.

- Location within Northern Cape Location within South Africa
- Coordinates: 29°21′00″S 21°09′00″E
- Country: South Africa
- Province: Northern Cape
- District: ZF Mgcawu
- Municipality: Kai !Garib
- Established: 1868

Area
  - Total: 159.35 km^{2} (61.53 sq mi)

Population (2011)
  - Total: 4,843
  - Density: 30.39/km^{2} (78.72/sq mi)

Racial makeup (2011)
  - Black African: 1.9%
  - Coloured: 92.2%
  - Indian/Asian: 1.1%
  - White: 4.3%
  - Other: 0.5%

First languages (2011)
  - Afrikaans: 96.5%
  - Other: 3.5%
- Time zone: UTC+2 (SAST)
- Postal code (street): 8900
- PO box: 8900
- Area code: 054

Kenhardt (founded 1868) is a small town in the Northern Cape province of South Africa. This little town is about 120 km from Upington, the largest town in the area.

== History ==
On 27 December 1868, special magistrate Maximillian Jackson and a police contingent were sent to act as a bulwark against the Griquas (also known as Koranna), who were in open conflict with colonial forces. They arrived in Kenhardt and set up camp under a giant camelthorn tree.

This has been for a long time the most remote settlement in the North-Western Cape. With time the town developed from under this tree, becoming a municipality in 1909. The Hartbees River, with its many sweet thorn trees, provides a green belt irrigated by the Rooiberg Dam. Kenhardt is famous for being at the heart of the Dorper sheep-farming area.

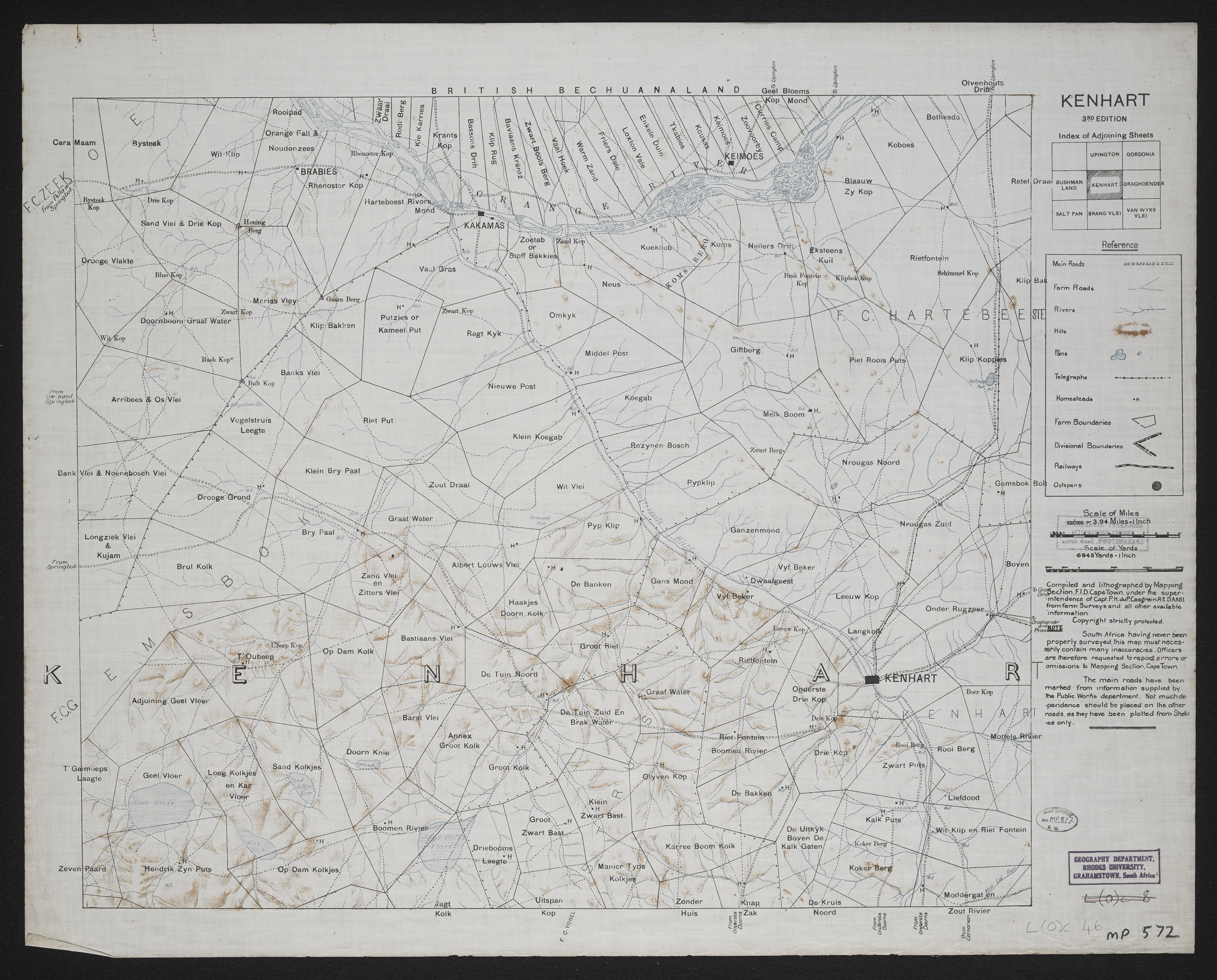

== Geography ==
This region contains very little vegetation, primarily very low shrubs and yellow grass among a rocky desert kind of landscape. If you travel south from Kenhardt towards Brandvlei, you will pass through a huge landscape of yellow grass lands and rocky desert like ares for the next 145 km and more. During the seasons many birds flock to the pans, when they contain water, after some rainfall. Temperature above 40 °C is not uncommon.

== Activities ==
- Visit the Quiver Tree forest, Kokerboom Woud in Afrikaans, about 5 km south of Kenhardt on the main route to Cape Town. Some of these trees have special formed weaver birds nests. The forest comprises approximately 4,000 to 5,000 trees.
- Walk the geological legendary granite metamorphic outcrops of the area. Along the trail all kind of quartz lie scattered.
- Tours to the pans on the outlying farms where you can view San artwork and enjoy the farm hospitality.
- A hiking trail where Anglo Boer War remains and the beautiful landscape can be experienced.
- Make your own discoveries on fossilized foot impressions and engravings.

== Places of interest ==
- Giant Camelthorn Tree

This tree is about 500–600 years old. It is under this tree which Magistrate Jackson set up his camp in 1868.

- Old Library Building

The old library was built in 1897, and it was used until 1977. In 1978 it was declared a national monument, currently it is used by Sanlam as their office.

- Verneukpan

A vast dry pan on which Sir Malcolm Campbell tried, in Bluebird 1, to set a new world land-speed record in 1929.

== See also ==
- Kenhardt Solar Power Complex Station
- List of cities and towns in the Northern Cape
- Northern Cape
- Kakamas, Northern Cape
- Upington, Northern Cape
