= Thomson & Taylor =

Thomson & Taylor were a motor-racing engineering and car-building firm, based within the Brooklands race track. They were active between the wars and built several of the famous land speed record breaking cars of the day.

== Thomas Inventions Development Co. Ltd. ==
The firm was founded as Thomas Inventions Development Co. Ltd. by J. G. Parry-Thomas & Major Ken Thomson. Their workshops were based in the 'flying village' inside the circuit at Brooklands, a convenient location for their customers, who raced there. Parry-Thomas lived in an adjacent former Royal Flying Corps building named The Hermitage.

== Thomson & Taylor ==
After Parry-Thomas' death whilst driving Babs at Pendine Sands in 1927, Major Ken Thomson carried on, joined by Ken Taylor, under the new name of Thomson & Taylor. Reid Railton, who had previously worked for Parry-Thomas at Leyland joined them as Technical Director and chief designer.

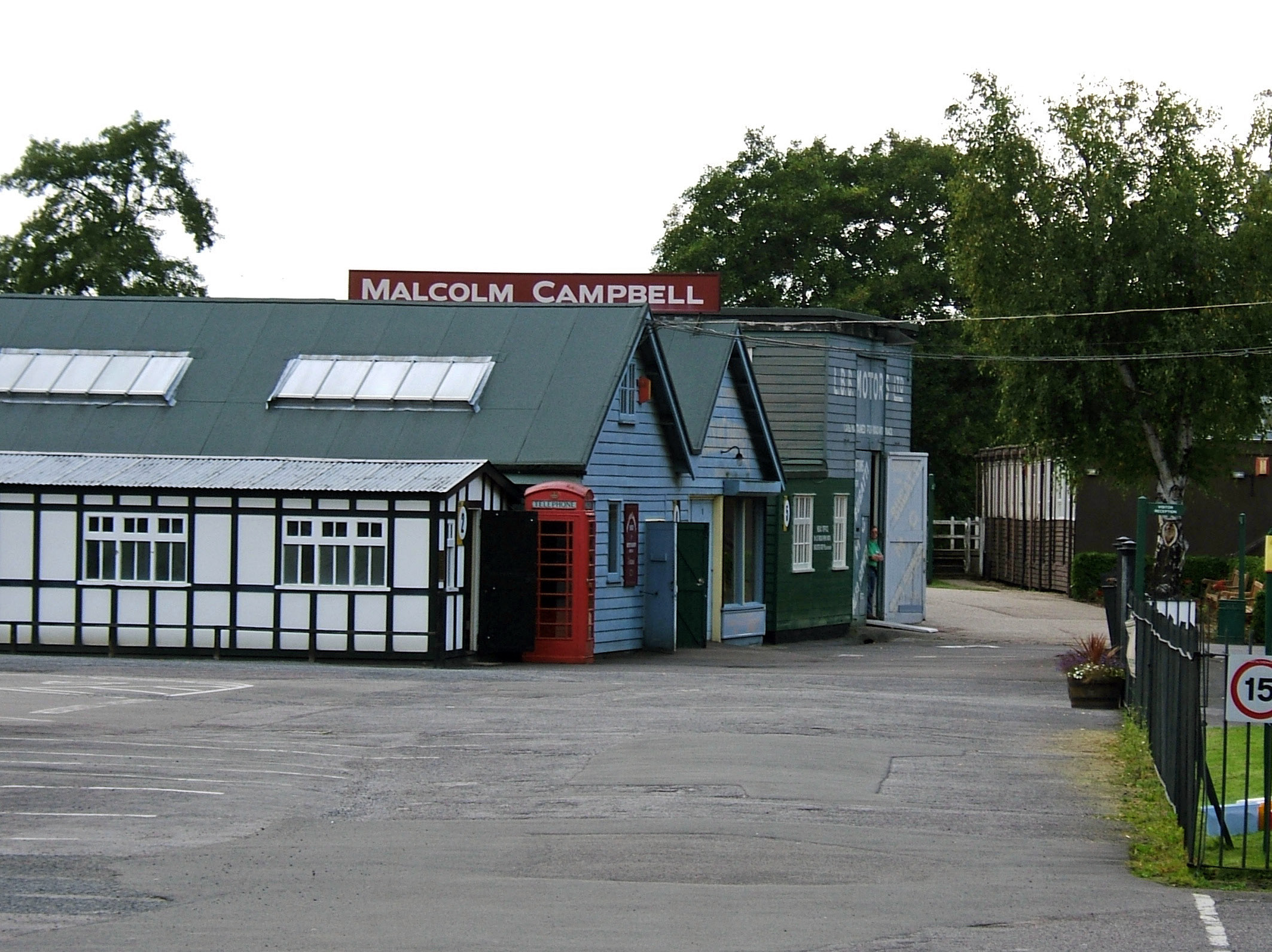
Campbell Shed, pale blue, centre

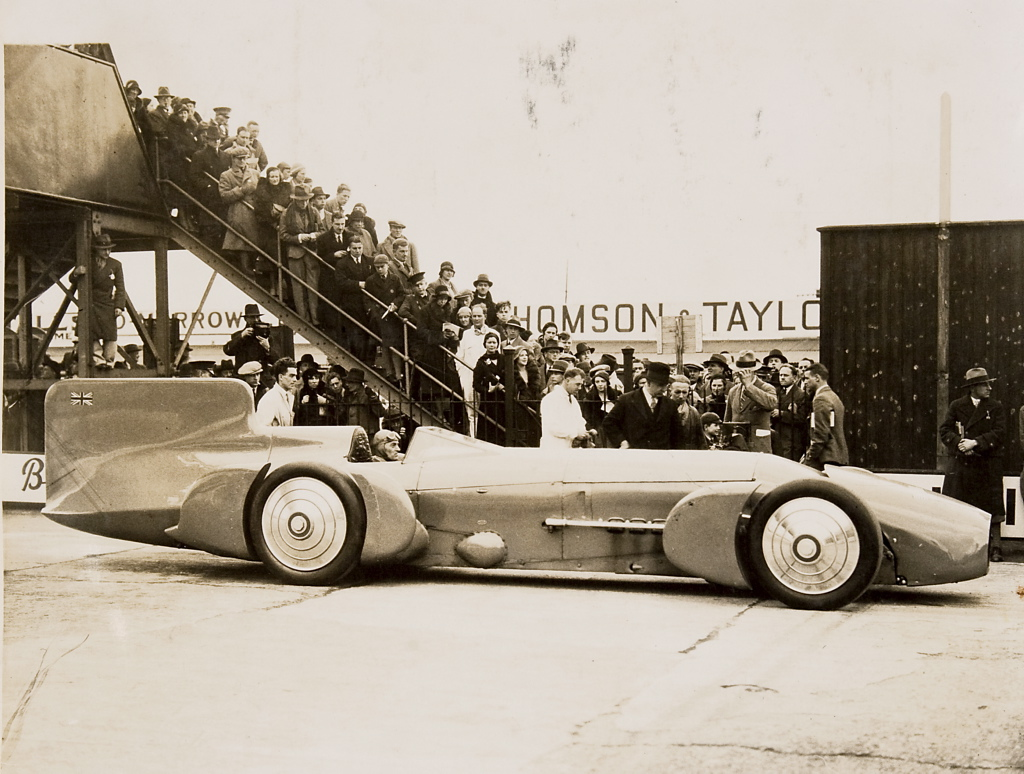
Malcolm Campbell's Blue Bird

In 1926 Malcolm Campbell had opened the 'Campbell Shed' at Brooklands, trading in racing sports cars. As the name suggests, this was a simply constructed wooden shed but it grew bigger and bigger, even being used to hold a barn dance in 1931. The famously impetuous Campbell lost interest though and handed it over to Thomson & Taylor. The shed survives today as part of the Brooklands Museum.

== Notable cars ==
- Blue Bird (1931)
- Napier-Railton (1933)
- Blue Bird (1933)
- ERA racing cars. 17 Railton-designed chassis were built from 1934, then completed with Peter Berthon-tuned Riley-derived engines by the ERA factory at Bourne.
- Railton Special (1938)
