= Campbell-Napier-Railton Blue Bird =

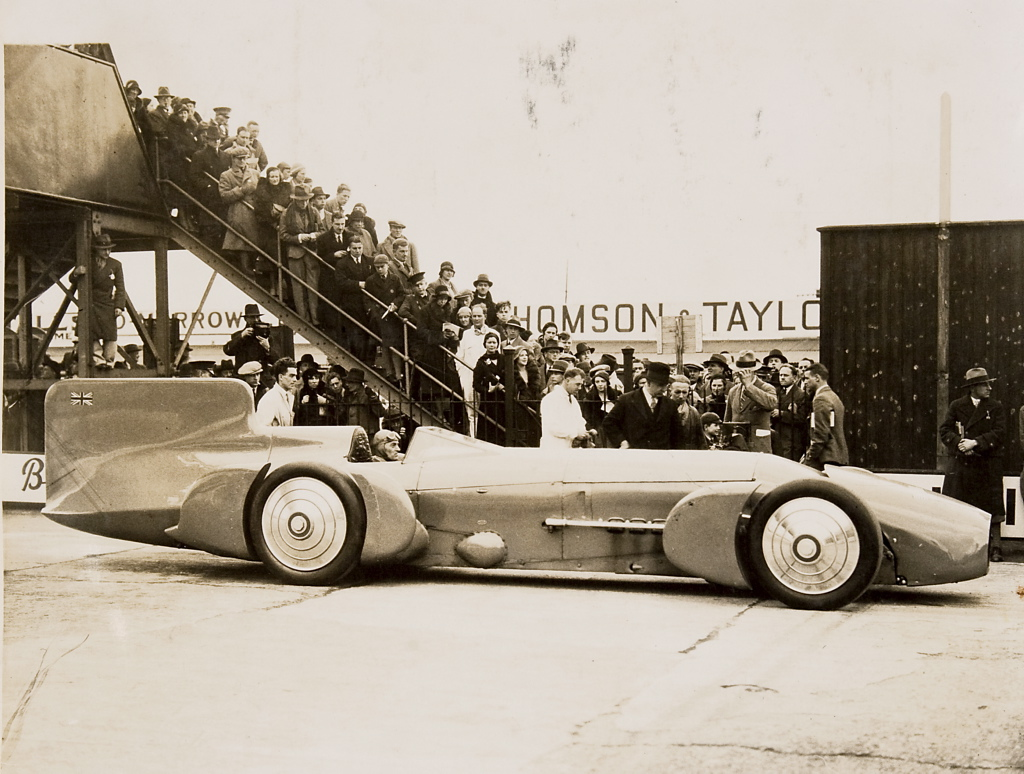
- Malcolm Campbell's Blue Bird

Overview
- Manufacturer: Thomson & Taylor, bodywork by Gurney Nutting
- Production: One-off (1931)
- Designer: Reid Railton

Body and chassis
- Body style: Open-wheel, front-engined land speed record car.
- Related: Napier-Campbell Blue Bird; Campbell-Railton Blue Bird

Powertrain
- Engine: 1,450 hp 23.9 litre supercharged Napier Lion VIID W12

Dimensions
- Wheelbase: 12 ft 2 in (3.71 m), track 5 ft 4 in (1.63 m) front, 4 ft 2 in (1.27 m) rear
- Length: 25 ft (7.6 m)
- Curb weight: 71 cwt (7952 lb)

The Campbell-Napier-Railton Blue Bird was a land speed record car driven by Malcolm Campbell.

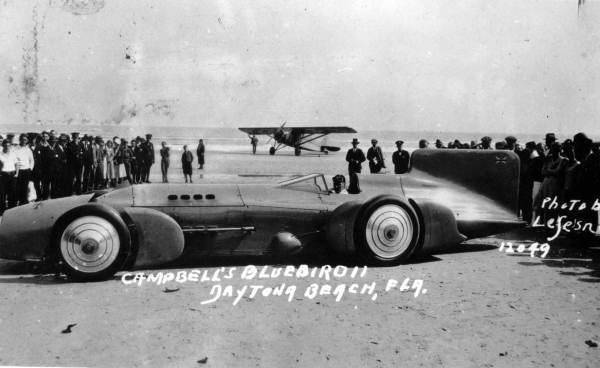
Blue Bird at Daytona Beach 1931

After Henry Segrave's Golden Arrow, clearly a more powerful engine was required for Blue Bird, with a chassis and transmission to handle it. A supercharged Napier Lion VIID was used, with over three times the power of the previous Blue Bird and a large premium over Golden Arrow's unsupercharged 900 hp (670 kW) Lion VIIA. This was not the first use of supercharging for Land Speed Record cars, but was the first combining supercharging with the large displacement aero engines that had previously been relied upon for their gross output. Golden Arrow's innovative vertical aerodynamic stabilising fin was also used, a first for Campbell.

Campbell's nemesis Segrave was killed in an attempt on the water speed record while Campbell was scouting for new record courses in South Africa. On his return, Campbell set off for Daytona with the new Blue Bird, concerned at American challenges to the record. Segrave had, after all, at least been British. On 5 February 1931 he pushed the record to 246 mph (396 km/h), to great popular acclaim. On his return he learned he was to be knighted as Sir Malcolm Campbell. A year later he returned and pushed through to 251 mph (404 km/h). This record stood for another year, until he himself broke it with his next car, the next Rolls-Royce-engined 1933 Blue Bird.
