= Hakskeenpan =

Salt pan in the Kalahari desert

- Location within South Africa
- Location: Dawid Kruiper Local Municipality, Northern Cape
- Coordinates: 26°49′22.88″S 20°08′17.58″E
- Etymology: Afrikaans: Hakskeen, lit. 'Heel'
- Basin countries: South Africa
- Surface area: 140 square kilometres (54 sq mi)

Hakskeenpan or Hakskeen Pan is a mud and salt pan in the Kalahari Desert, in Southern Africa. It is located in the Dawid Kruiper Local Municipality region in the Northern Cape, South Africa, at 801 metres (2,628 ft) above sea level. The pan covers an area of approximately 140 square kilometres (54 sq mi)

== Formation, geology and climate ==
=== Long-term landscape evolution ===
The present day Kalahari landscape—essentially an inland sand sea sitting within an uplifted sedimentary basin—is the result of a variety of interacting tectonic and geomorphological processes that have operated over considerable timescales. The initial development of the Kalahari was closely linked to the evolution of the African landmass following the break-up of the supercontinent Gondwanaland during the Mesozoic. The gradual separation of Africa from present-day Australia, Antarctica, India and South America was associated with progressive heating and rifting of the crust, which led to the uplift of the southern African continental margin in the mid- to Late Cretaceous. The development of this uplifted margin had significant implications for regional fluvial systems; the end product was a dual drainage pattern consisting primarily of short rivers draining directly into the sea off the Great Escarpment and longer rivers draining inland and never reaching the sea.

=== Pan environments ===
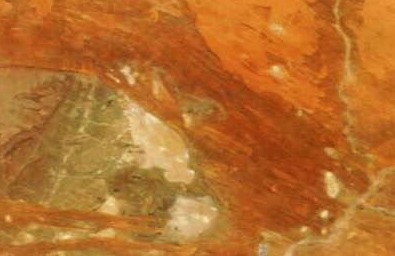
Satellite image of the pan (just left of center) and its vicinity

Pans are small, closed basins or depressions that contain seasonally flooded lakes and are characteristic of arid to semi-arid regions of low relief. They are also of considerable importance as point water sources for both humans and wildlife. Pans occur throughout the Kalahari, as far north as Zambia, but are a particularly significant component of the landscape in regions with (i) an annual rainfall of less than 500 mm and (ii) underlying rock or sediment that is susceptible to erosion by the wind. The southern Kalahari meets both of these criteria.

Two areas containing concentrations of pans occur within the southern Kalahari: (i) a broad zone extending from Upington, across the lower Molopo and northwards into Namibia and (ii) a smaller area between Vryburg in North West Province and Tsabong in Botswana. Within these zones, pans occur as isolated landscape features but also within depressions in the floors of dry valleys and palaeodrainage lines, and in the corridors between linear dunes. The majority lack any surface inflow, although some may have short, poorly developed channels that supply run-off during major rainfall events. Hakskeen Pan is one of the largest isolated pans in the South African Kalahari, the other notable one being Koppieskraal Pan immediately south-west of the Kgalagadi Transfrontier Park.

=== Climate ===
The climate in the Southern Kalahari ecoregion is semi-arid. Temperatures fluctuate greatly, on both a seasonal and a daily basis, with mean maximum and minimum temperatures of 35.7 °C and 19.5 °C in January and 22.2 °C and 1.2 °C in July. Rainfall is unreliable and irregular, falling primarily during short-duration, high intensity thunderstorms between November and April. Before the rainy season begins, strong northwesterly winds blow between September and November, producing dust storms. Mean annual precipitation is approximately 223mm. Humidity is low and evaporation high, the latter resulting in the characteristically large deficit in the annual water budget. River water tends to be alkaline and turbid, but the rivers flow only briefly after rainfall, and rapid infiltration into the sandy Kalahari soil means that floods, although they do at times occur, are rare, and river flow ceases quickly.

== Name ==
In Afrikaans "Hakskeen" means “heel”, which is probably a reference to the shape of the pan on a map. "Pan" is the Afrikaans word for "dry lake".

== Land speed record attempt ==
=== Bloodhound LSR ===
The Bloodhound LSR team selected Hakskeen Pan to conduct their 1000 mph land speed record attempt after the rains in the Black Rock Desert were insufficient to wash flat the marks left by the Burning Man Festival. After researching other sites the team found Hakskeenpan which was selected due to its flat surface. The track that Bloodhound LSR will run on at Hakskeen Pan is 1100 metres wide and 20 km long.

The date for the first land speed record attempt (to improve on the current record of 763 mph (1,228 km/h)) was set to 2020, with high speed trials starting October 2019. The aim of the Bloodhound project is to set a land speed record of 1,000 mph (1,600 km/h); this attempt was scheduled for 2020. In a November 2019 test, the land speed racer reached 628 mph (1,011 km/h).

The Bloodhound supersonic car project to race a car at more than 1000 mph had been axed after it failed to secure a £25m cash injection. On 17 December 2018 the project was saved by a cash injection from a Yorkshire-based entrepreneur for an undisclosed amount.

== See also ==
- Verneukpan
- Etosha pan
- Makgadikgadi Pan
- Salar de Uyuni
- Sua Pan
