= Verneukpan =

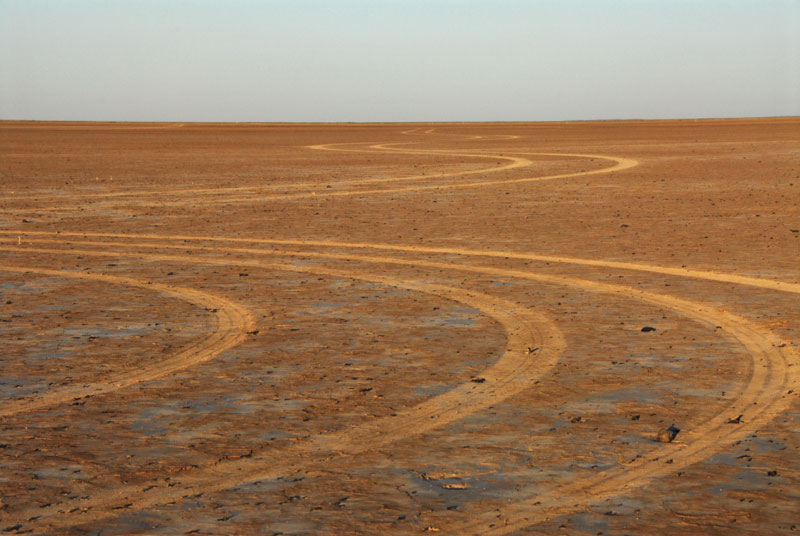
- Vehicle tracks on Verneukpan.

- Location within South Africa
- Coordinates: 30°00′30.11″S 21°08′40.89″E
- Country: South Africa
- Province: Northern Cape
- Region: Kenhardt
- Time zone: UTC+2 (SAST)

Verneukpan is a widespread dry salt pan south of Kenhardt, between Swartkop and Diemansput in the Northern Cape, South Africa. Verneuk is Afrikaans for to trick, mislead, screw or swindle. The pan is used for aerotowing operations. During the rainy seasons many birds flock to the pans, when they contain water. The surface is completely flat, and is approximately 57 kilometres (35 mi) long and 11 kilometres (7 mi) wide.

In 1929 the pan was used by Sir Malcolm Campbell, who unsuccessfully attempted to break the land speed record in his Napier-Campbell Blue Bird. Andy Green visited the pan during 2008, while investigating surfaces for use by Bloodhound SSC.

== Location ==
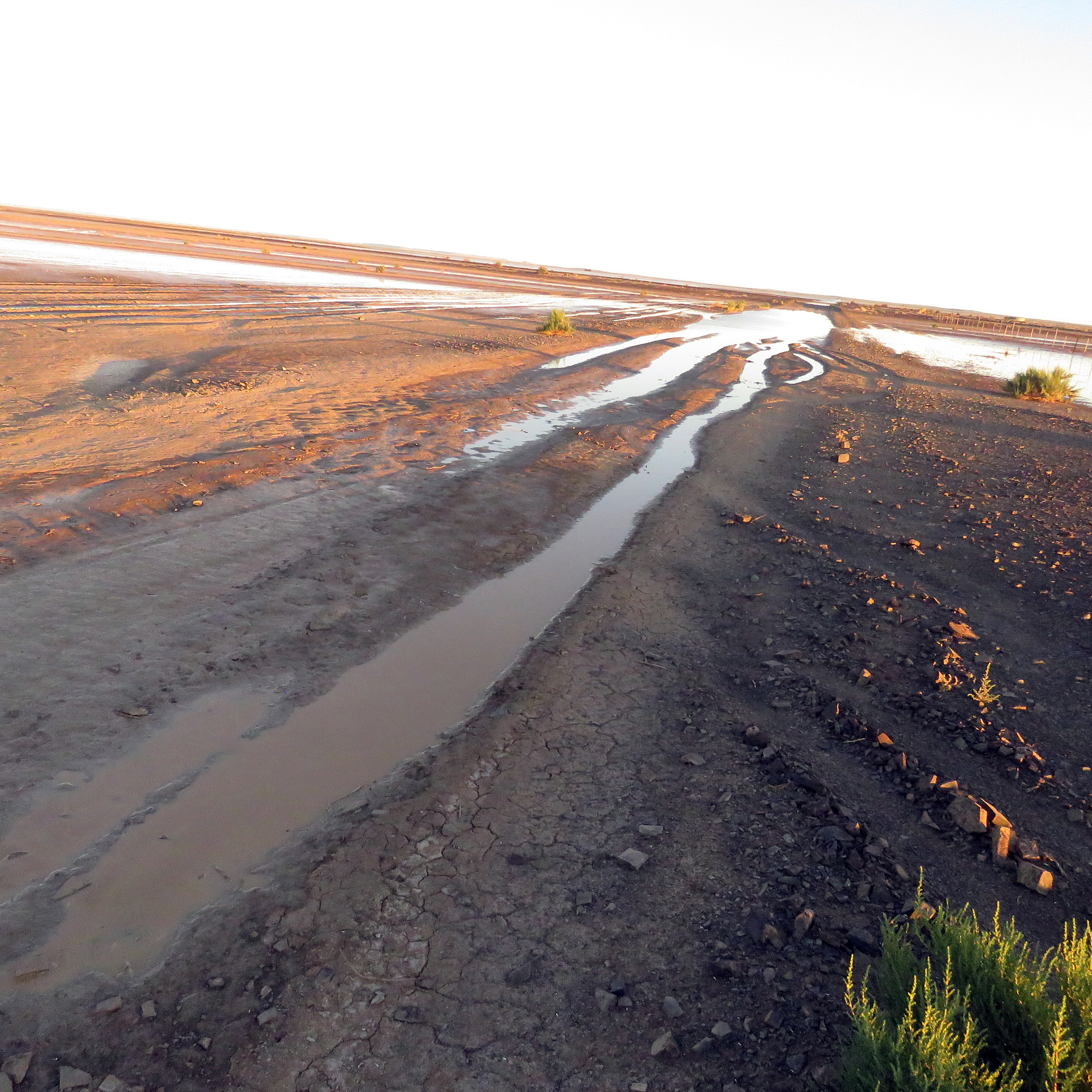
After rainfall (April, 2022).

This region contains very little vegetation, primarily very low shrubs and yellow grass among a rocky desert kind of landscape. During the seasons many birds flock to the pans, when they contain water, after some rainfall. Temperature above 40 °C is not uncommon.

The surface is completely flat, claimed to be a dried-up lake estimated 57 kilometres (35 mi) long and 11 kilometres (7 mi) wide. A large section of the pan's surface is moderately covered with grass and rocks. It can be reached by driving about 115 kilometres (71 mi) south from Kenhardt on the way to Cape Town.

== Former Agricultural Contours ==
Aerial imagery has revealed extensive former agricultural contouring on this pan, suggesting a once much wetter climate.

== Landspeed records ==
=== Malcolm Campbell ===
In 1929 the pan was used by Sir Malcolm Campbell, attempting to raise the land speed record in his Napier-Campbell Blue Bird. The trip to the Bushmanland was not an easy one for Campbell. First he lost his briefcase with important papers in it. Secondly he survived when his aeroplane crashed in a tree near Calvinia. A threatening assignment was facing the people preparing the track. Willem Louw was in charge sweeping the pan. Puffadders and scorpions were very common in the area and the temperature could rise to 42 °C in the shade during the summer. Campbell and his crew underestimated the Verneukpan's tricks.

The track, starting from a hill on the outskirts and striking into the heart of the pan was supposed to be 16 miles (26 km) long. It was spread out directly west–east and looked straight into the rising sun. The dust devils were a major hazard for Campbell. Mirages created phantom trees and ghostly men on stilts. Extremely sharp stones were spread all over the pan's surface. When these stones were removed, holes were left. The day of the Flash in the Pan was postponed time after time. A tortoise on the track, was named Blue Bird II.

During the setbacks, the targeted record of 200 miles per hour (322 km/h) was pushed to 231.36 miles per hour (372 km/h). Campbell wanted to reach 300 miles per hour (483 km/h), but his mean speed for the measured mile was 218.45 miles per hour (352 km/h). He failed to break the record when the coarse surface damaged his tyres. He had vanquished the speed record he had come to South Africa for, but it was 6 weeks too late. With only one set of tyres left, he took on the 5 kilometres (3 mi) record, reaching 202 miles per hour (325 km/h).

The Bluebird started her last run on 25 January 1929, at 05:00, under the moon and the early light. She flashed like a silver bullet along the white line that stretched beyond sight. He set two records that day. The first for the 5 kilometres (3 mi), reaching 211 miles per hour (340 km/h). Secondly for the 5 miles (8 km), reaching 212 miles per hour (341 km/h). He promised to come back in his Springbok. He eventually never did. In a new Bluebird designed by Reid Railton, Campbell broke the land speed record four more times at Daytona. In 1935 Campbell did exceed 300 miles per hour (483 km/h) reaching 301.337 miles per hour (485 km/h) at Bonneville Salt Flats in Utah, becoming the first man to exceed 300 miles per hour (483 km/h) on land. The track that he compacted on the pan is still visible today.

Verneuk pan is the most interesting experience experiment I have ever made.

— Sir Malcolm Campbell's response in his first interview.

=== Vic Proctor ===
During 1952 Vic Proctor tried to set the world motorcycle record on his Vincent Black Lightning, but eventually crashed at around 160 kilometres per hour (99 mph). Later that year he set the Flying Mile record, but not at Verneukpan.

=== Bloodhound SSC ===
Andy Green also visited the pan during 2008, as he needed to check every possible surface to rank them all for use by Bloodhound SSC. The pan is well known for its high-quality alkali playa surface, which would be perfect for Bloodhound. Unfortunately it is also covered by a huge number of stones (klippe). While the pan meets all the other requirements for a land speed record track, removing the stones over the huge area needed would require a vast amount of manual work.

== Accidents ==
This is also the place where Johan Jacobs – South African land speed record holder and former fighter pilot – died on 27 June 2006. His jet car, Edge, went out of control and flipped while travelling at approximately 500 kilometres per hour (311 mph). This happened during a practice run for an attempt to break the 24-second world record for the standing mile over 1.67 kilometres (1 mi).

== Activities ==
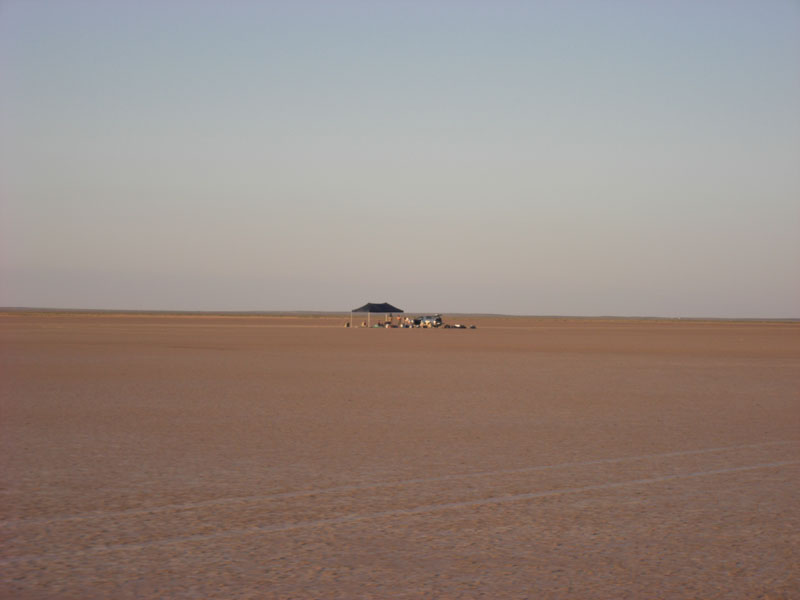
Some campers on Verneukpan.

The pan is a well-known kiting destination in South Africa. The widespread open spaces offer opportunities for parasailing. The pan is also used by kite-surfers, an extreme sport using wind buggies. These are bicycle-like vehicles with a sail attached to them. With wind buggies speeds of up to 70 kilometres per hour (43 mph) can be reached. There are also many viewpoints that are used for birdwatching. South African pop singer Karlien van Jaarsveld recorded the music video for 'Hande' on the fields. The farm Kareeboomdam played host to The Brightrock Battle of the Sports challenge with some of South Africa's best-known sports people like John Smith, Makaya Ntini, Bruce Foredyce, Butch James, Schalk Brits, and Lance Klusner in 2020. The farm has direct access to "Campbell’s Koppie" with views across the length of the pan and the Sir Malcolm Campbell's track and allows visitors to wild camp on Verneukpan.

== See also ==
- Etosha pan
- Kenhardt
- Makgadikgadi Pan
- Salar de Uyuni
- Sua Pan
- Hakskeenpan
