= J Gurney Nutting & Co =

English bespoke coachbuilder

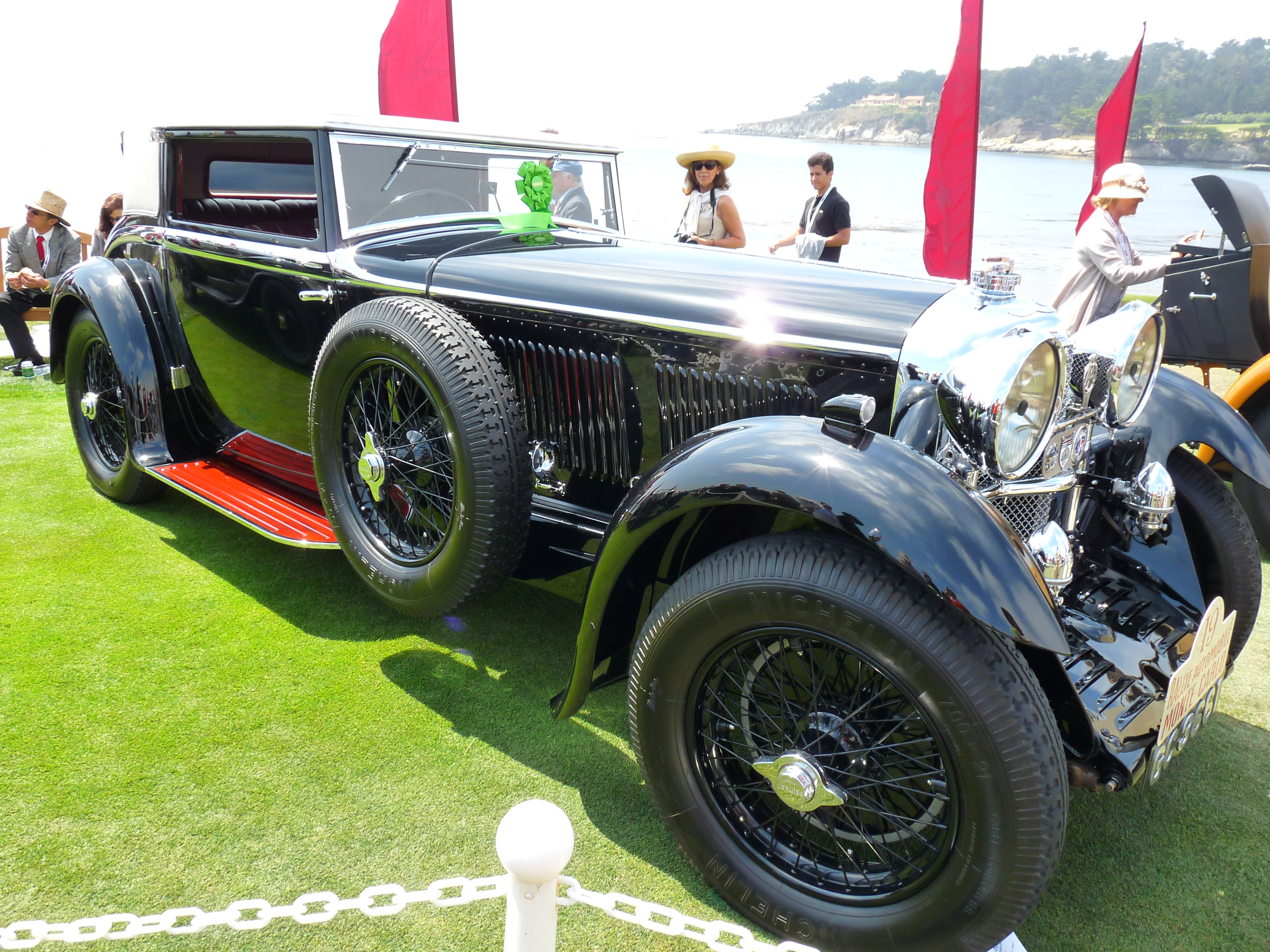
Bentley Speed Six 1930 Weymann fixed head coupé

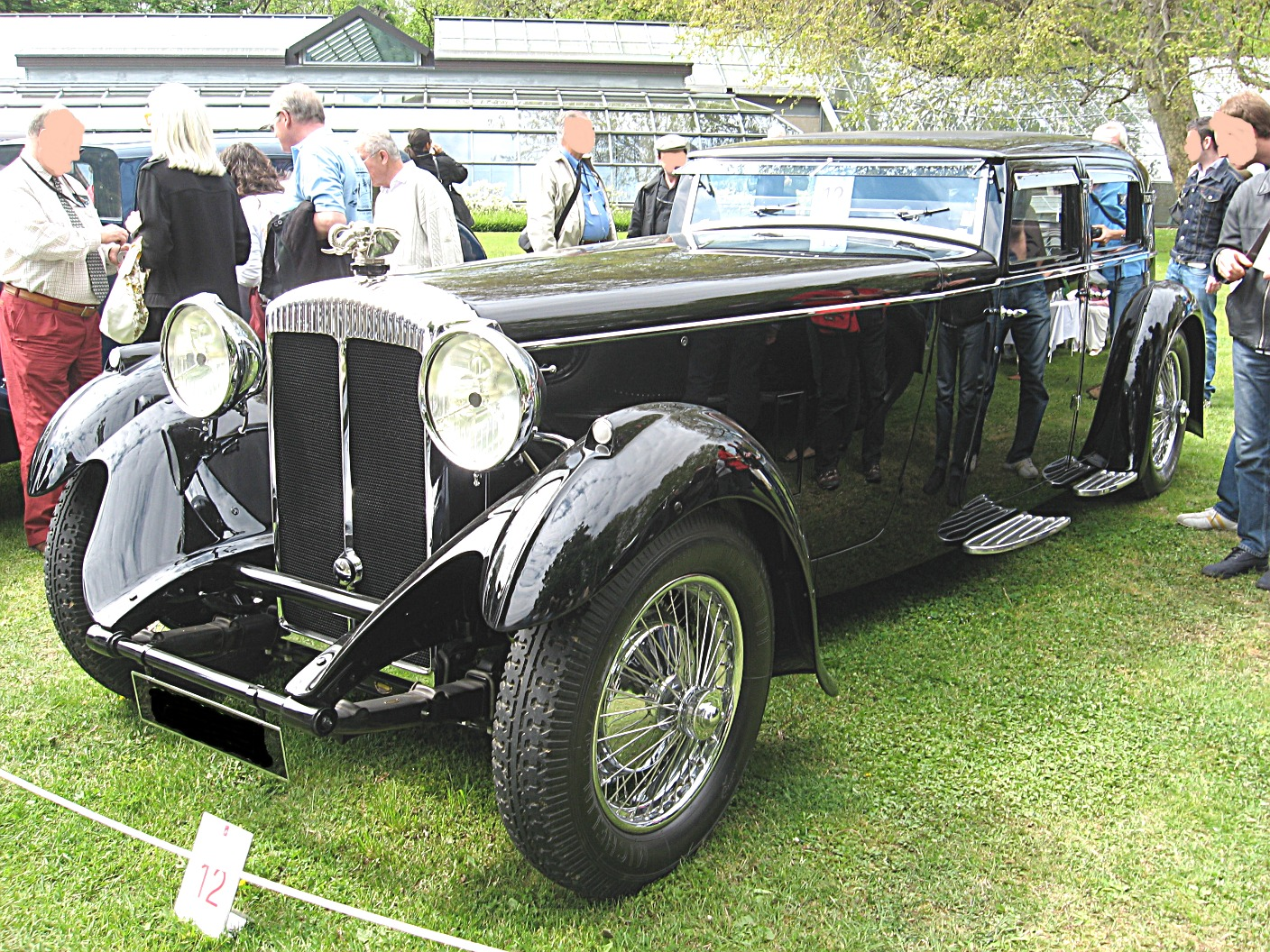
Daimler Double-Six 1932 close-coupled 4-door sports saloon for Anna Neagle

J Gurney Nutting & Co Limited was an English firm of bespoke coachbuilders specialising in sporting bodies founded in 1918 as a new enterprise by a Croydon firm of builders and joiners of the same name. The senior partner was John (Jack) Gurney Nutting (1871–1946).

Nutting had done well from wartime government building contracts and with his partner from that business, a man named Cresswell, they set up operations in the old Marlborough Carriage Works in Oval Road, Croydon.

The first Gurney Nutting designs made their appearance at the London Motor Show in October 1920. In 1921 they displayed their 'all weather' body, the roof folded in the usual way but the side windows simply lowered into the doors.

After the Croydon premises were destroyed by fire during Easter 1923 the business was moved nearer their customers to the upmarket address of Elystan Street, off King's Road in Chelsea, London.

== Chelsea ==
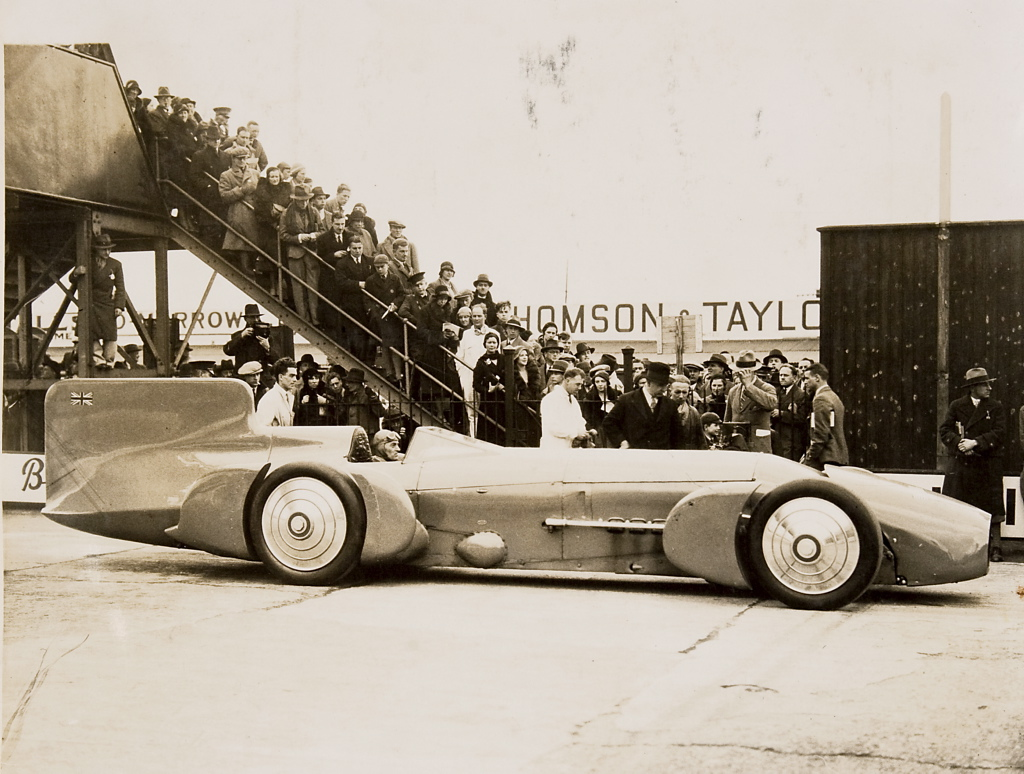
Malcolm Campbell's 1931 Blue Bird

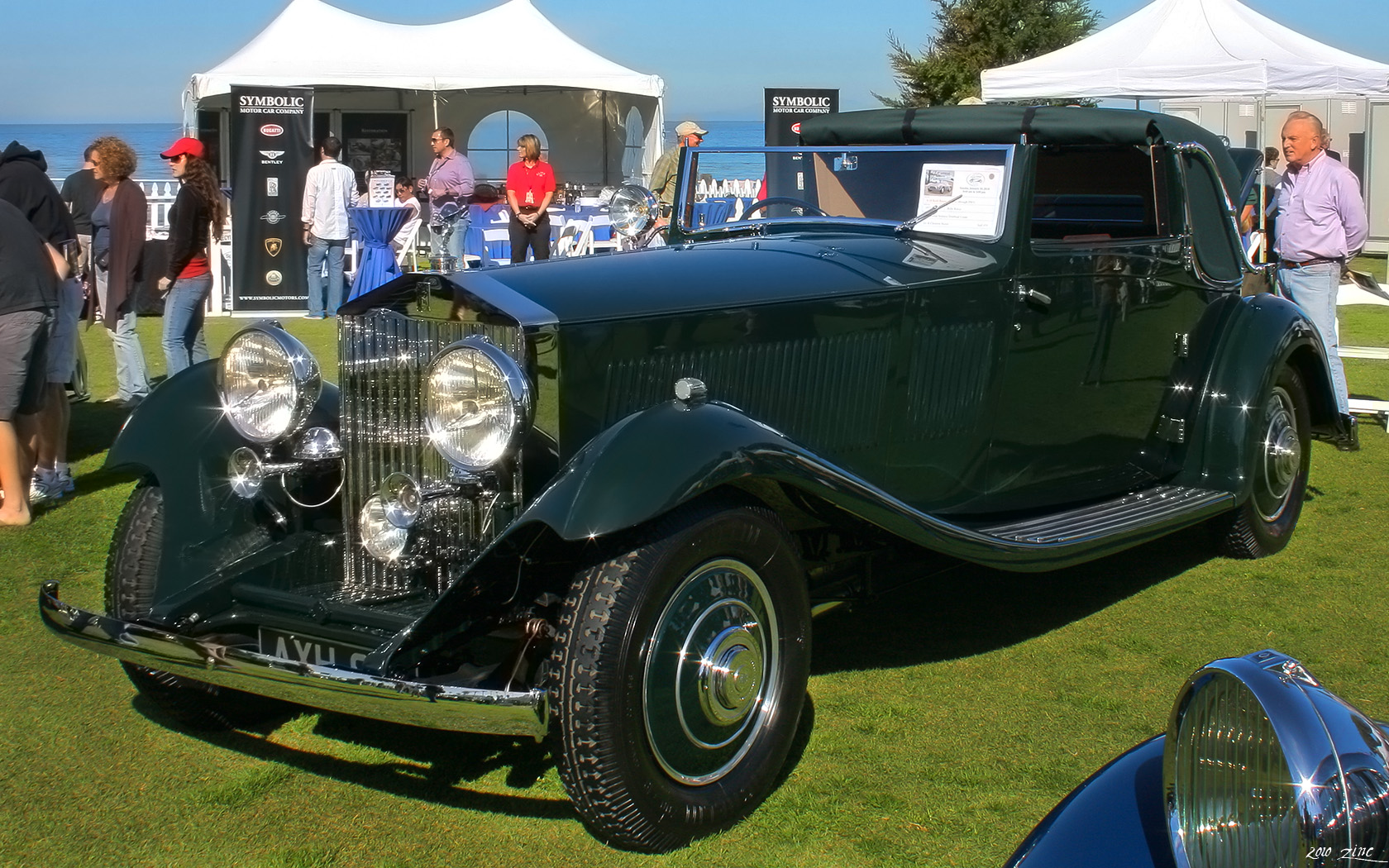
Rolls-Royce Phantom II Continental 1933 coupé de ville

In Chelsea, which had been an artists' colony, Gurney Nutting established their reputation for creating sumptuous beautifully executed cars with panache and apparently naturally balanced proportions. 1924 brought two events that lifted the firm into prominence. The purchase of a licence to employ the Weymann technique of body construction gave a new silence and lightness to the cars of their customers who selected it and, more important, Scotsman A. F. McNeil (1891–1965), 'Mac', who had been with Cunard, joined the firm as chief designer. McNeil's designs would give the firm the greatest and most successful of its years. The Weymann construction forced a square-rigged style but McNeil's designs had a carefully calculated relationship in their proportions which seemed instinctively right.

== Royal patronage ==
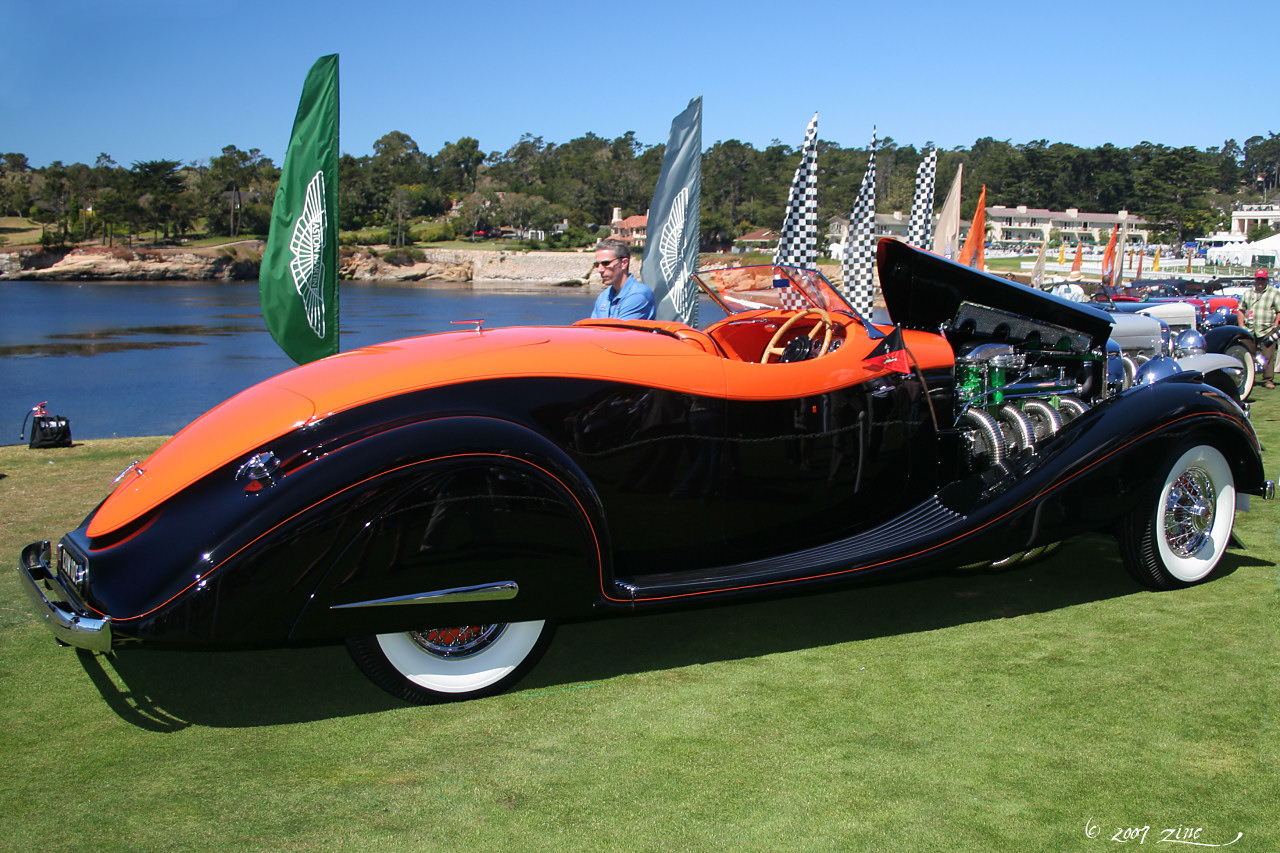
Duesenberg Model J 1935 speedster

In June 1926 a 21 hp Lanchester chassis fitted with a Weymann body was delivered to the future King George VI. A few months later his younger brother ordered a Weymann body on a Bentley chassis. The stand at the 1926 motor show had just Weymann designs, a 6 1/2-litre Bentley in black above white and a beautiful 37 hp Hispano-Suiza in black above primrose.

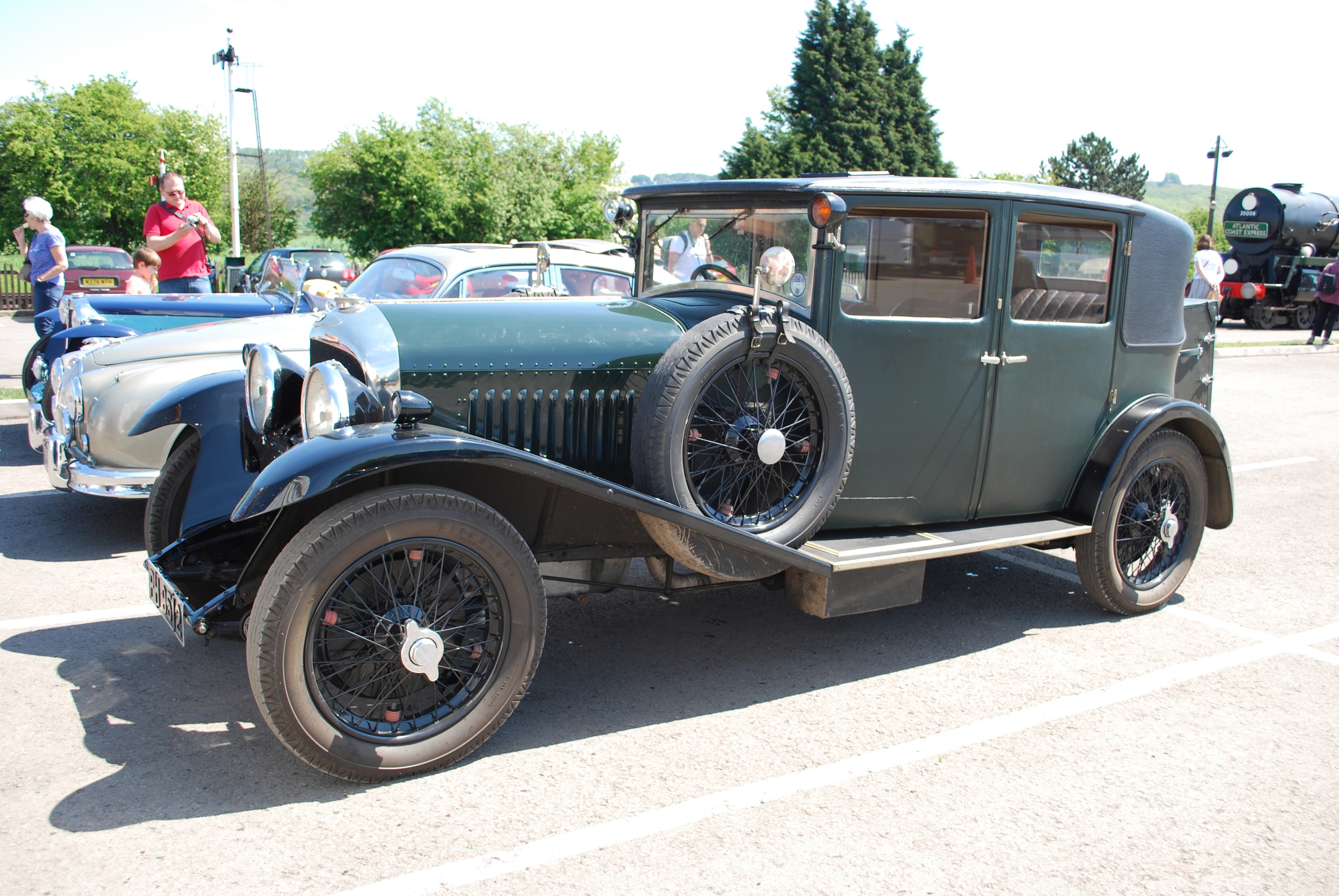
Bentley 4½ Litre 1928

The car which built their reputation for prominent customers was built in 1928 for the style-setter of the time. In January 1928 the Prince of Wales, later Edward VIII, later still Duke of Windsor, commissioned a Weymann body on a 4 1/2-litre Bentley which was to have a high waistline with shallow windows allowing passengers increased privacy. The "Prince of Wales" body style became a best-seller. At the beginning of 1931 Nuttings received a Royal Warrant appointing the firm Motor Body Builders to His Royal Highness The Prince of Wales.

== The end of Weymann bodies ==
A 1929 show car, a Bentley Speed Six Sportsman's coupé, used a specially polished fabric material to look as if it were an old-fashioned coachbuilt body. The economic crisis hit. Noting how the older Weymann bodies showed their age the customers, those still able to buy, began to choose glossy cellulose-finished more rounded and traditionally coachbuilt bodies. Metal panels replaced fabric on some Weymann bodies but the time of Weymann flexible coachwork was over by 1932.

On 4 September 1930, Gurney Nutting moved, less than a mile, to more spacious premises in Lacland Place. A few weeks later they showed at Olympia a metal panelled Weymann Bentley Sportsman's coupé beside another Bentley of traditional construction for the first time exhibiting Nutting's trademark, a deep chrome-plated beading strip running from the grille to above the rear mudguards and emphasising the sweeping new lines of the car.

J Gurney Nutting built the body for Malcolm Campbell's 1931 Blue Bird world speed record car.

== 1930s ==
The 1930s were the firm's greatest years. Bodies were built to order on other chassis but mostly these were the years of the Rolls-Royce and Bentley saloons, coupés de ville and sedancas de ville.

Near the end of the decade Jack Barclay tempted A. F. McNeil to James Young Limited and his place was taken by'John Blatchley (1913–2008), still in his early twenties. Blatchley was a graduate of the Chelsea College of Aeronautical and Automobile Engineering and Regent Street Polytechnic recruited by McNeil. After the war he was appointed chief stylist of Rolls-Royce and Bentley and he retired from there in 1969. McNeil remained John Blatchley's teacher mentor and friend for many years.

In 1940 a straight-eight Daimler limousine was produced at Lacland Place, the curves replaced by razor edges. The Daimler had been given square-cornered windows, a flat waistline and a raked but square-edged tail. It was greeted as "very very handsome, in a totally new idiom", but there was a war on.

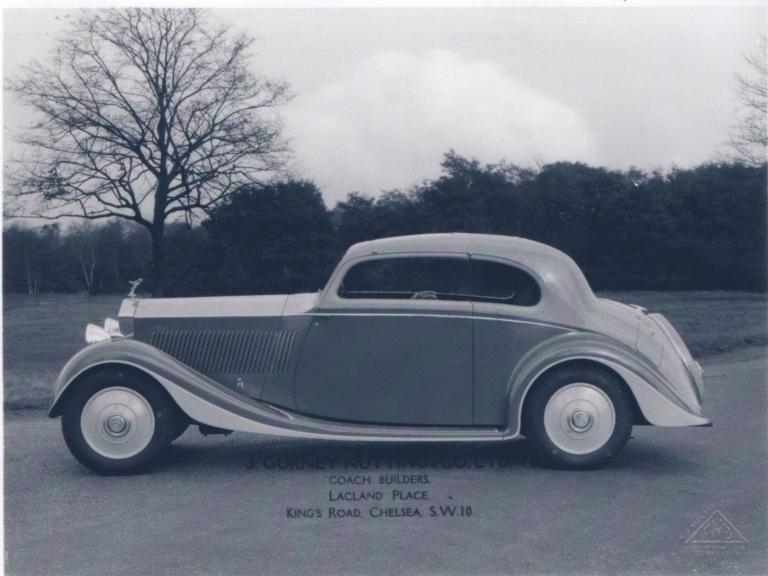
1935 Rolls Royce 20/25 Pillarless coupé (GBJ53)

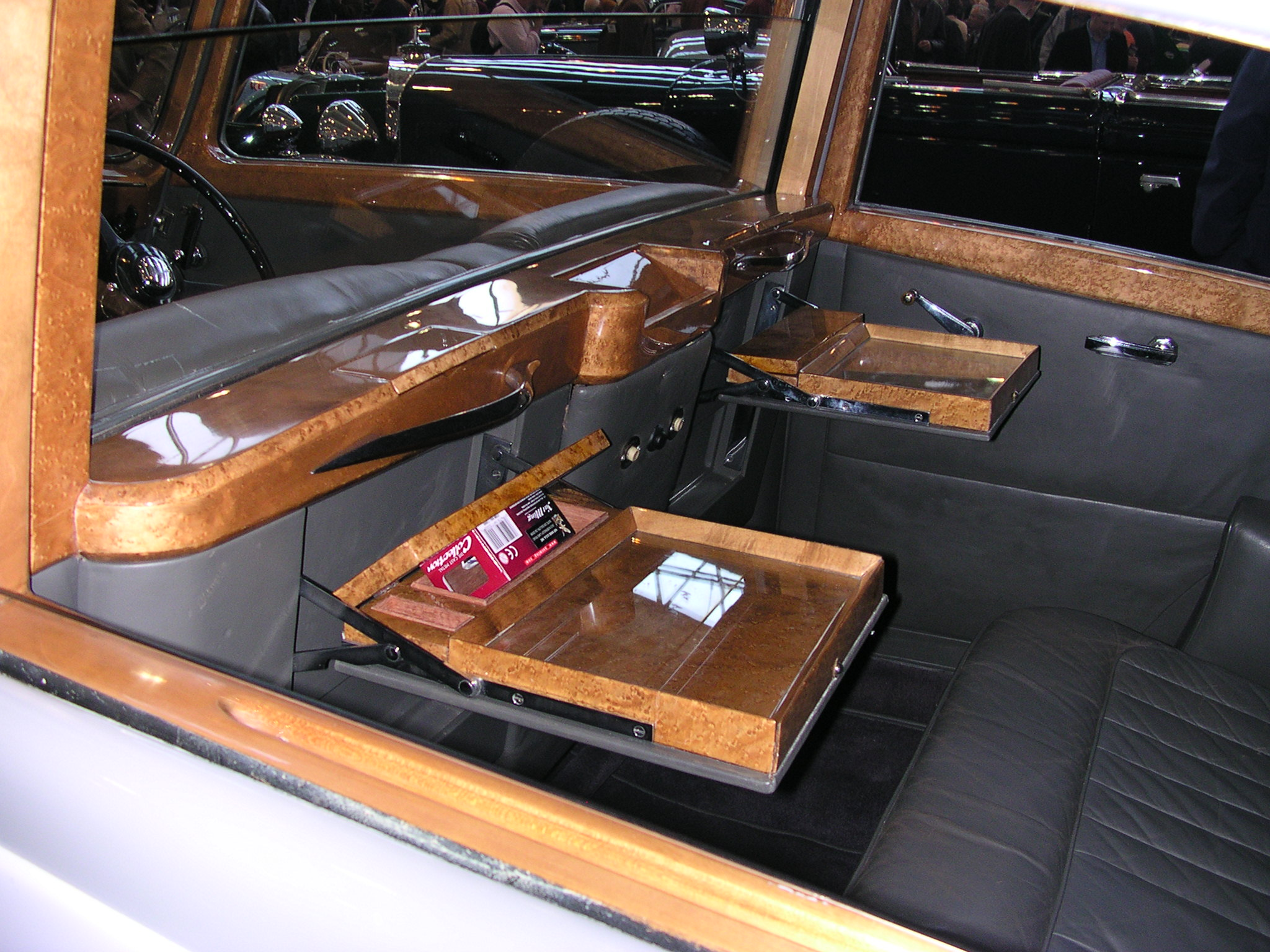
Rolls-Royce Phantom III 1936

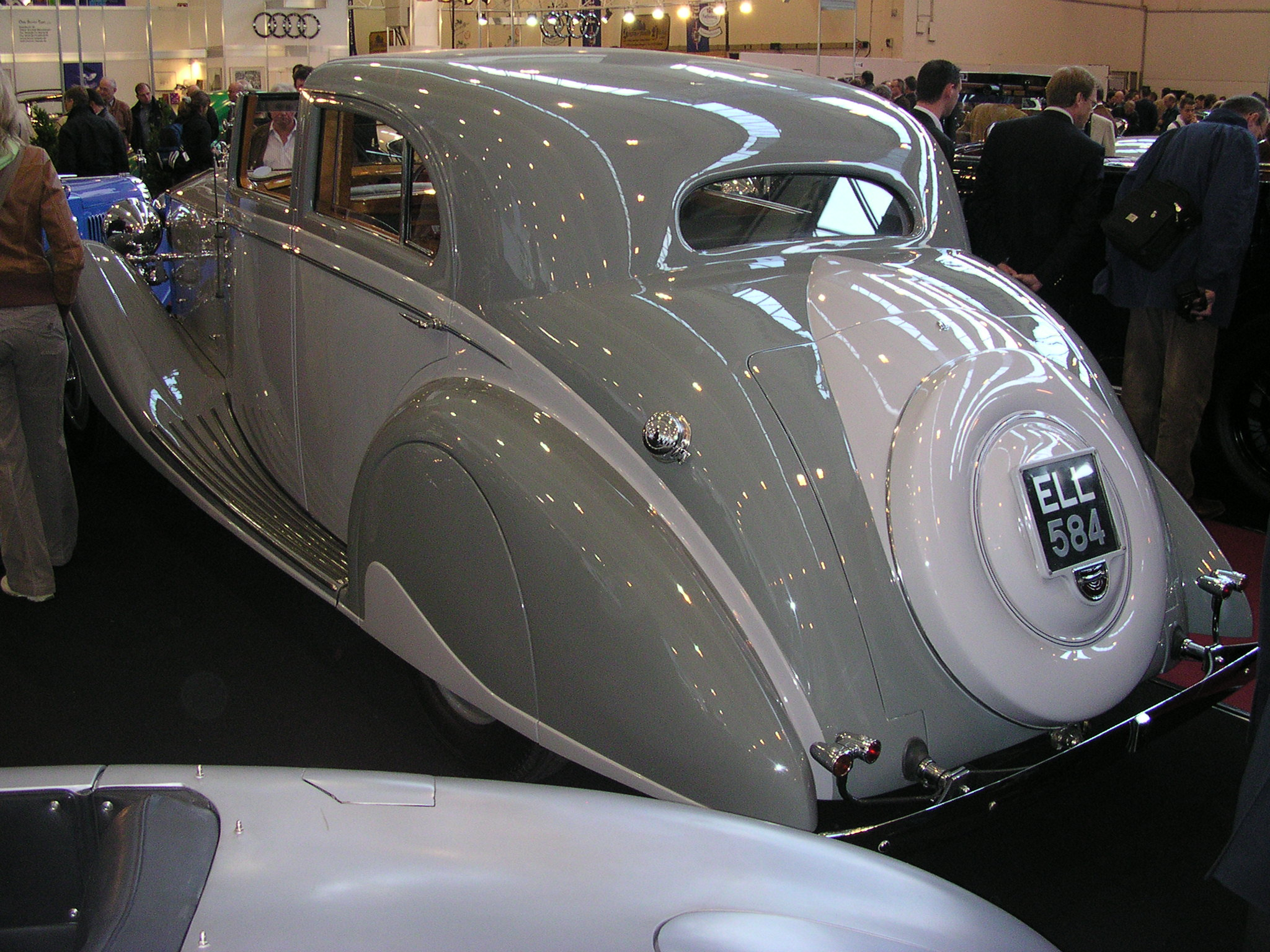
Rolls-Royce Phantom III 1936
sedanca de ville

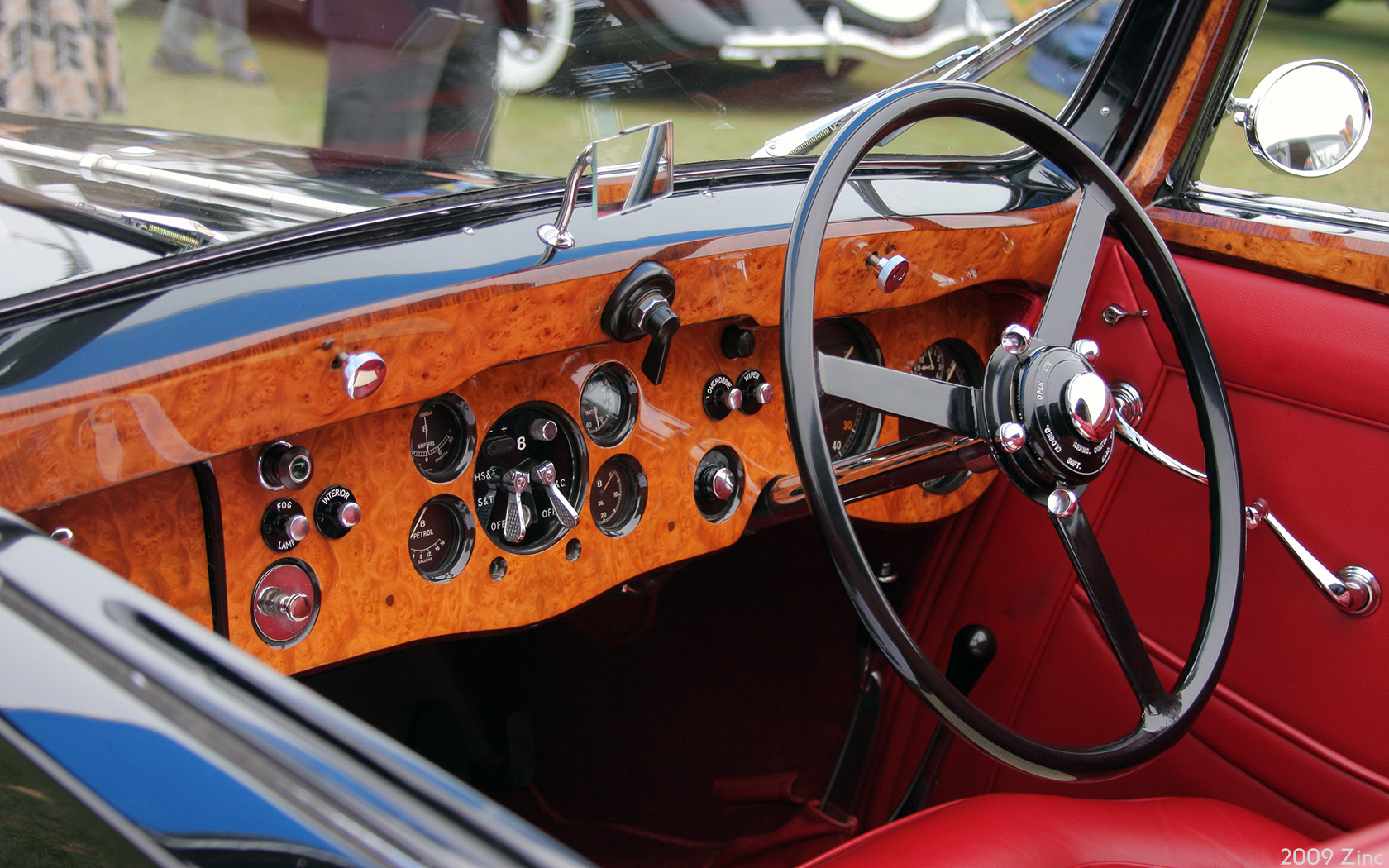
Bentley
4¼-litre1937
coupé de ville

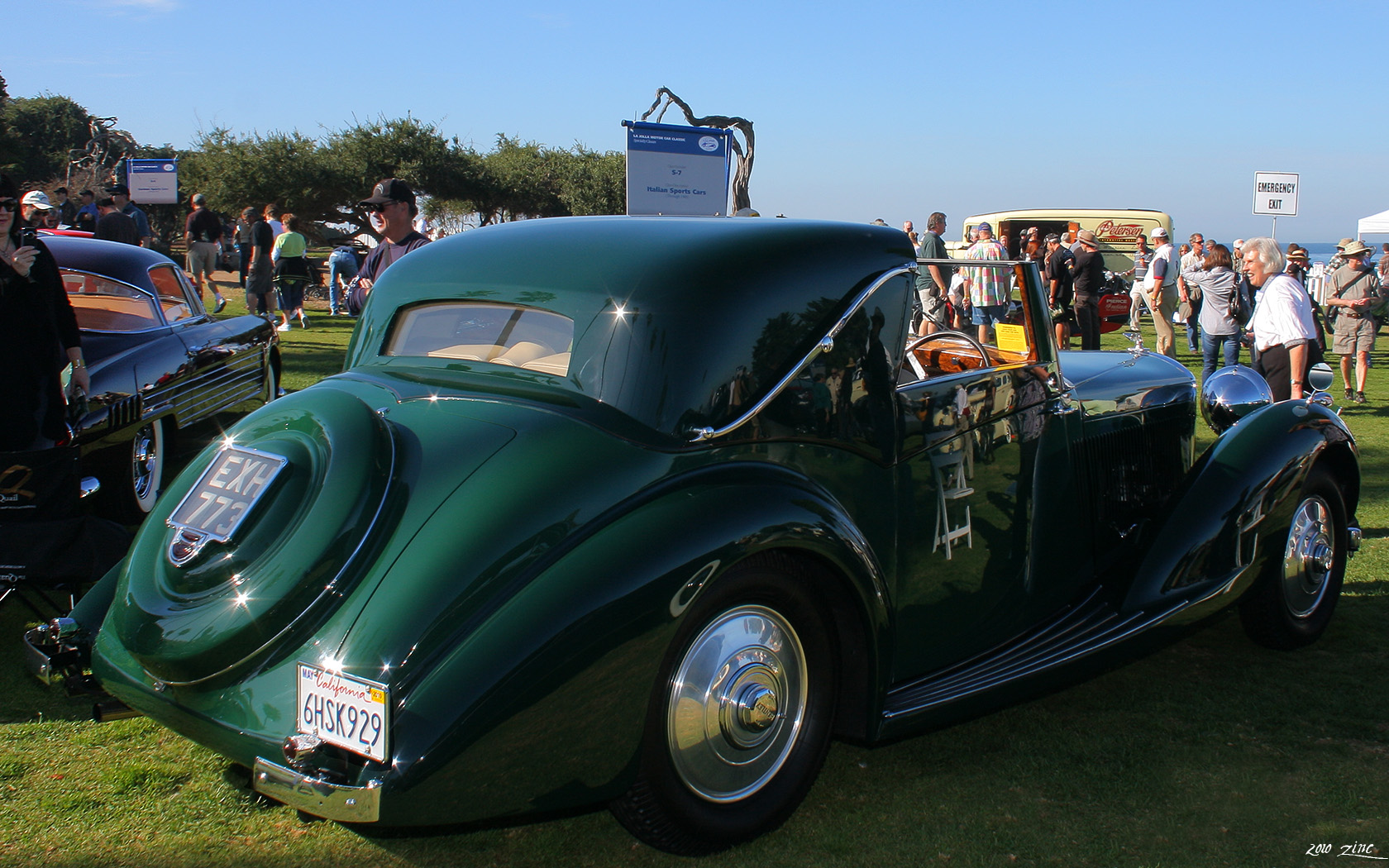
Bentley
4¼-litre1938
coupé de ville

== Closure ==
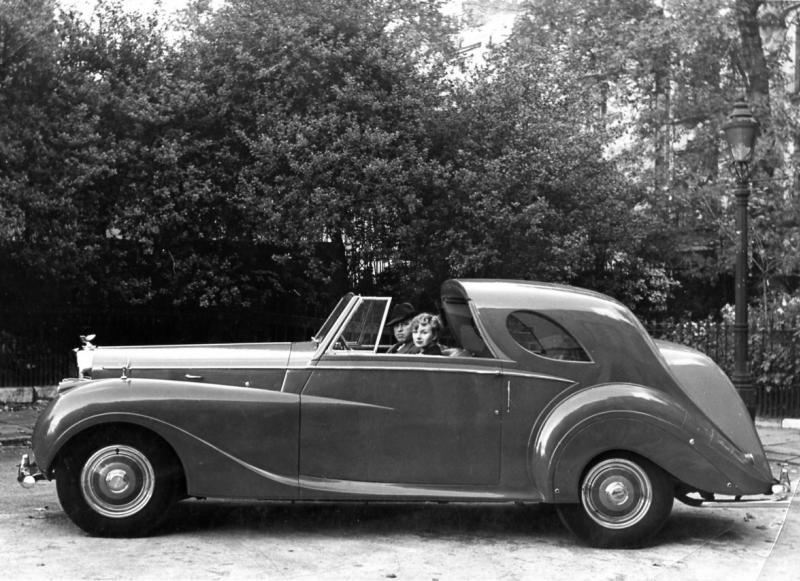
Bentley Mark VI teardrop coupé de ville

With the outbreak of World War II all coachbuilding work was suspended. During the war Gurney Nutting built boats, from lifeboats to patrol boats. In 1945 the business was renamed Gurney Nutting Ltd, styling themselves as "coachbuilders and engineers" and became part of the Jack Barclay group which had acquired James Young Limited in 1937. John Gurney Nutting, who remained a director, was in ill-health and died 10 February 1946 aged 75. The works moved to Lombard Road, Morden Road, Merton, with some work done at the James Young premises in Bromley. However, the demand for bespoke one-off bodies for cars died away in the post-war years and their last Motor Show stand was in 1948, when they showed two cars built on the Bentley Mark VI chassis. However, they also built full-size bus and coach bodies and were still carrying out production of these in late 1952, closing sometime after.
