= Napier-Campbell Blue Bird =

Napier-Campbell 'Bluebird II'
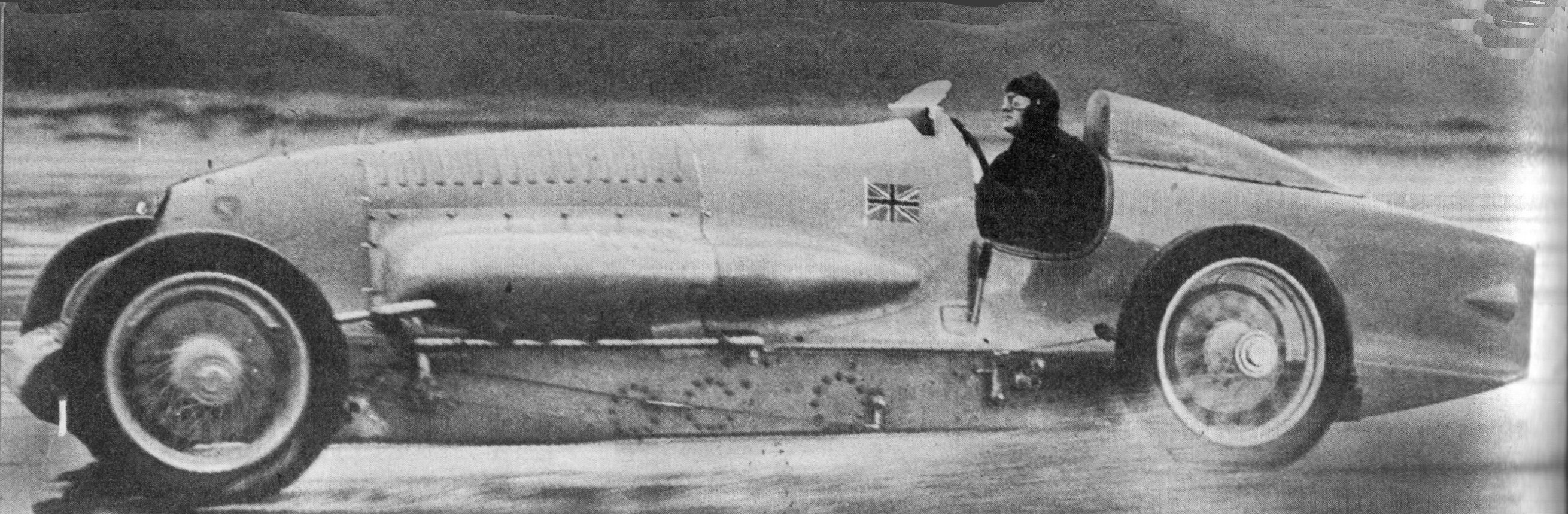

Overview
- Production: one-off (1927)
- Designer: C. Amherst Villiers

Body and chassis
- Body style: open-wheel, front-engined racing car.
- Related: Campbell-Napier-Railton Blue Bird

Powertrain
- Engine: 22.3 litre W12-block Napier Lion VIIA, 450 hp @ 2,000 rpm, 502 hp @ 2,200 rpm
- Transmission: 3-speed epicyclic, ratios of 0.333, 0.666, 1 final drive ratio 1.27:1

Dimensions
- Wheelbase: 12 ft 1.5 in (3.696 m), track 5 ft 5.25 in (1.6574 m) front, 4 ft 9 in (1.45 m) rear
- Length: 18 ft (5.5 m)
- Curb weight: approx. 3 tons dry

The Napier-Campbell Blue Bird was a land speed record car driven by Malcolm Campbell. Its designer was C. Amherst Villiers and Campbell's regular mechanic Leo Villa supervised its construction.

This was Campbell's first car to use the Napier Lion aero engine. His intention was to surpass his previous Sunbeam Blue Bird's achievement of the 150 mph barrier and to reach 200 mph.

== 1927 ==
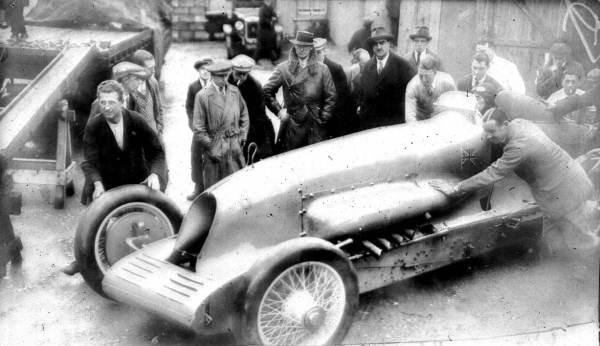
Blue Bird in 1927

When first built, the car used a Napier Lion engine of around 500 bhp. It was of conventional form with a front-mounted vertical radiator and the driver behind the engine. The three banks of the W-12 engine were hidden behind bulges in the narrow bonnet, with exhaust stub pipes protruding.

Bluebird's first record attempt was on 4 February 1927 at Pendine Sands. A peak speed of 195 mph (314 km/h) was achieved, tantalisingly close to the magic 200 mph (320 km/h), but the two-way average recorded for the record was lower, at 174.883 mph (281.45 km/h).

== 1928 ==
Napier-Campbell "Blue Bird III"
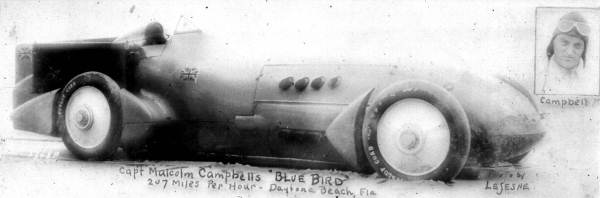

Overview
- Production: one-off (1928), rebuild of the 1927 car. Other details unchanged

Body and chassis
- Related: Napier-Campbell 'Blue Bird II'

Powertrain
- Engine: 23.948 litre Napier Lion "Sprint", 875 hp (652 kW) at 3,300 rpm
- Transmission: final drive ratio 1.5:1

Dimensions
- Length: 18ft
- Curb weight: 52cwt dry

The 1927 record was short-lived, as Segrave's Sunbeam 1000 hp achieved both the 180 mph and 200 mph targets a month later. This prompted Campbell to rebuild the car as "Blue Bird III" for 1928. He persuaded the Air Ministry to allow him a Schneider Trophy-tuned "Sprint" engine, as fitted to the Supermarine S.5 seaplane, of 900 hp (670 kW).

Improved aerodynamics were innovatively tested in Vickers' wind-tunnel by R.K. Pierson, their Chief Designer. Blue Bird's body shape was substantially changed, with the famous coachbuilders Mulliner producing the bodywork. The results were unorthodox. A vertical tail fin was added for stability, a first for Blue Bird and land speed record cars. Open spats behind the wheels also reduced drag. The biggest change was to the radiators, which were moved to the rear of the car and mounted externally. These surface radiators were made by Fairey Aviation and contained 2,400 ft (730 m) of tube. Removing the nose radiator allowed a low, rounded nose with better streamlining. However, one French newspaper compared its looks to a whale.

Following Segrave to Daytona Beach, on 19 February 1928 Campbell took the record at 206.956 mph (333.063 km/h), breaking the 200 mph barrier for his first time. Once again though he only held the record for a couple of months, losing it by a whisker to Ray Keech and the White Triplex.

== 1929 ==
Campbell sought a more predictable venue than a tidal beach, so he set off to survey possible sites by air. Africa showed promise, first at a site 600 miles from Timbuktu and so impractically inaccessible. A dry lake bed in South Africa, the Verneukpan, was still 450 miles (720 km) from Cape Town, but did have some chance of access.

Blue Bird was rebuilt for a third time. The chassis, engine and drivetrain remained the same, but the bodywork was replaced with one built in Dumfries by Arrol-Aster. This body was lower, requiring a hump around the cockpit where Campbell now sat astride the gearbox. The surface radiators were replaced by a conventional circular nose opening, covered by a distinctive "birdcage" grille.

Unfortunately, after a period of five years of no rainfall, it poured down almost as soon as they arrived. Campbell returned to Cape Town, where on his 44th birthday he learnt that Henry Segrave at Daytona Beach had set a new record in Golden Arrow at 231.44 mph (372.47 km/h). Blue Bird was unable to match this at the African altitude and climate, but he made the best use of the long course and set the world 5 mile and 10 mile records at 212 mph (341 km/h).

After Segrave had raised the record in Golden Arrow by a whole 30 mph (48 km/h) though, Campbell knew that Blue Bird was beaten and began work on a new car, the Campbell-Napier-Railton Blue Bird.

== Bibliography ==
- Kenny, Paul (2009). The Man Who Supercharged Bond: The Extraordinary Story of Charles Amherst Villiers (Hardback). Sparkford: Haynes Publishing. ISBN 978-1-84425-468-2.
