= Malcolm Campbell =

British racing driver and speed record holder (1885–1948)

Sir Malcolm Campbell MBE
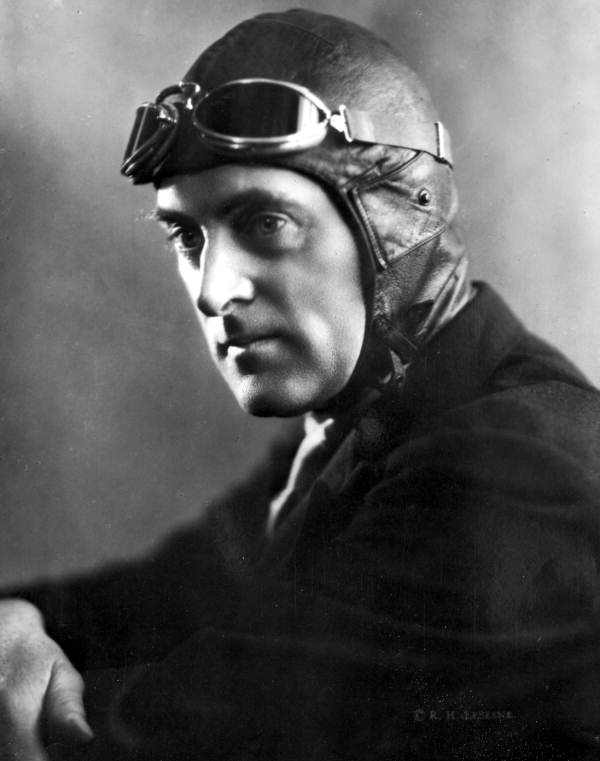
- Sir Malcolm Campbell in 1935
- Born: 11 March 1885; Chislehurst, Kent, England
- Died: 31 December 1948 (aged 63); Reigate, Surrey, England
- Resting place: St Nicholas Church, Chislehurst, Kent, England
- Education: Uppingham School
- Occupations: Racing motorist, journalist
- Spouses: Marjorie Dagmar Knott (m. 1913; div. 1915); Dorothy Evelyn Whittall (m. 1920; div. 1940); Betty Nicory (m. 1945)
- Children: Donald; Jean
- Military career
- Allegiance: United Kingdom
- Branch: British Army
- Service years: 1914–1945
- Rank: Major
- Service number: 86891
- Units: Queen's Own Royal West Kent Regiment

Major Sir Malcolm Campbell (11 March 1885 – 31 December 1948) was a British racing motorist and motoring journalist. He gained the world speed record on land and on water at various times, using vehicles called Blue Bird, including a 1921 Grand Prix Sunbeam. His son, Donald Campbell, carried on the family tradition by holding both land speed and water speed records.

== Early life and family ==
Campbell was born on 11 March 1885 in Chislehurst, Kent, the only son of William Campbell, a Hatton Garden diamond seller. He attended the independent Uppingham School. In Germany, learning the diamond trade, he gained an interest in motorbikes and races. Returning to Britain, he worked for two years at Lloyd's of London for no pay, then for another year at £1 a week.

Between 1906 and 1908, Campbell won all three London to Land's End Trials motorcycle races. In 1910, he began racing cars at Brooklands. He christened his car Blue Bird, painting it blue, after seeing the play The Blue Bird by Maurice Maeterlinck at the Haymarket Theatre.

Campbell married Marjorie Dagmar Knott in 1913, but they divorced two years later.

Campbell then married Dorothy Evelyn Whittall in 1920; their son Donald was born in 1921, and their daughter, Jean, in 1923. Dorothy, who became Lady Campbell when he was knighted in 1931, later described him as "quite unfitted for the role of husband and family man". They divorced in 1940.

Campbell married Betty Nicory in 1945 in Chelsea.

Campbell wrote a number of "motoring mystery" novels including Salute to the Gods which was the source material for the 1939 motion picture Burn 'Em Up O'Connor. In 1935, for the Ford Motor Company, he narrated the short film, Your Driving Test, which provided advice to prospective drivers on how to pass the new driving test that had been introduced in the UK that year.

== Military service ==
At the outbreak of the First World War, Campbell initially enlisted as a motorcycle dispatch rider and fought at the Battle of Mons in August 1914. Shortly afterwards he was commissioned as a second lieutenant in the 5th Battalion, Queen's Own Royal West Kent Regiment, a Territorial Force unit, on 2 September 1914. He was soon drafted into the Royal Flying Corps, where he was a ferry pilot, for his instructors believed he was too clumsy to make the grade as a fighter pilot.

During the late 1930s, Campbell commanded the provost company of the 56th (London) Division of the Territorial Army. From 1940 to 1942, he commanded the military police contingent of the Coats Mission tasked with evacuating King George VI, Queen Elizabeth and their immediate family from London in the event of German invasion. On 23 January 1943 he was transferred from the Corps of Military Police to the General List. On 16 December 1945, having attained the age limit of 60, Campbell relinquished his commission and was granted the honorary rank of major.

== Grand Prix career ==
Campbell competed in Grand Prix motor racing, winning the 1927 and 1928 Grand Prix de Boulogne in France driving a Bugatti T37A.

== Land speed record ==
Campbell broke the land speed record for the first time in 1924 at 146.16 mph (235.22 km/h) at Pendine Sands near Carmarthen Bay in a 350HP V12 Sunbeam, now on display at the National Motor Museum, Beaulieu. He broke nine land speed records between 1924 and 1935, with three at Pendine Sands and five at Daytona Beach. His first two records were accomplished whilst driving a racing car built by Sunbeam.

In 1925, Campbell set a new lap record of 100 mph (160.93 km/h) at Brooklands in a streamlined Chrysler Six.

On 4 February 1927, Campbell set the land speed record at Pendine Sands, covering the Flying Kilometre (in an average of two runs) at 174.883 mph (281.447 km/h) and the Flying Mile at 174.224 mph (280.386 km/h), in the Napier-Campbell Blue Bird.

Campbell set his final land speed record at the Bonneville Salt Flats in Utah on 3 September 1935, and was the first person to drive an automobile over 300 mph, averaging 301.337 mph (484.955 km/h) in two passes.

== Water speed records ==
Campbell developed and flotation-tested Blue Bird on Tilgate Lake, in Tilgate Park, Crawley. He set the water speed record four times, his highest speed being 141.740 mph (228.108 km/h) in the Blue Bird K4. He set the record on 19 August 1939 on Coniston Water, Lancashire (now in Cumbria).

== Politics ==
Campbell stood for Parliament without success at the 1935 general election in Deptford for the Conservative Party, despite his links to the British Union of Fascists. Reportedly, he once adorned his car with a Fascist pennant of the London Volunteer Transport Service, though there has been no photographic evidence to support this claim.

== Death ==
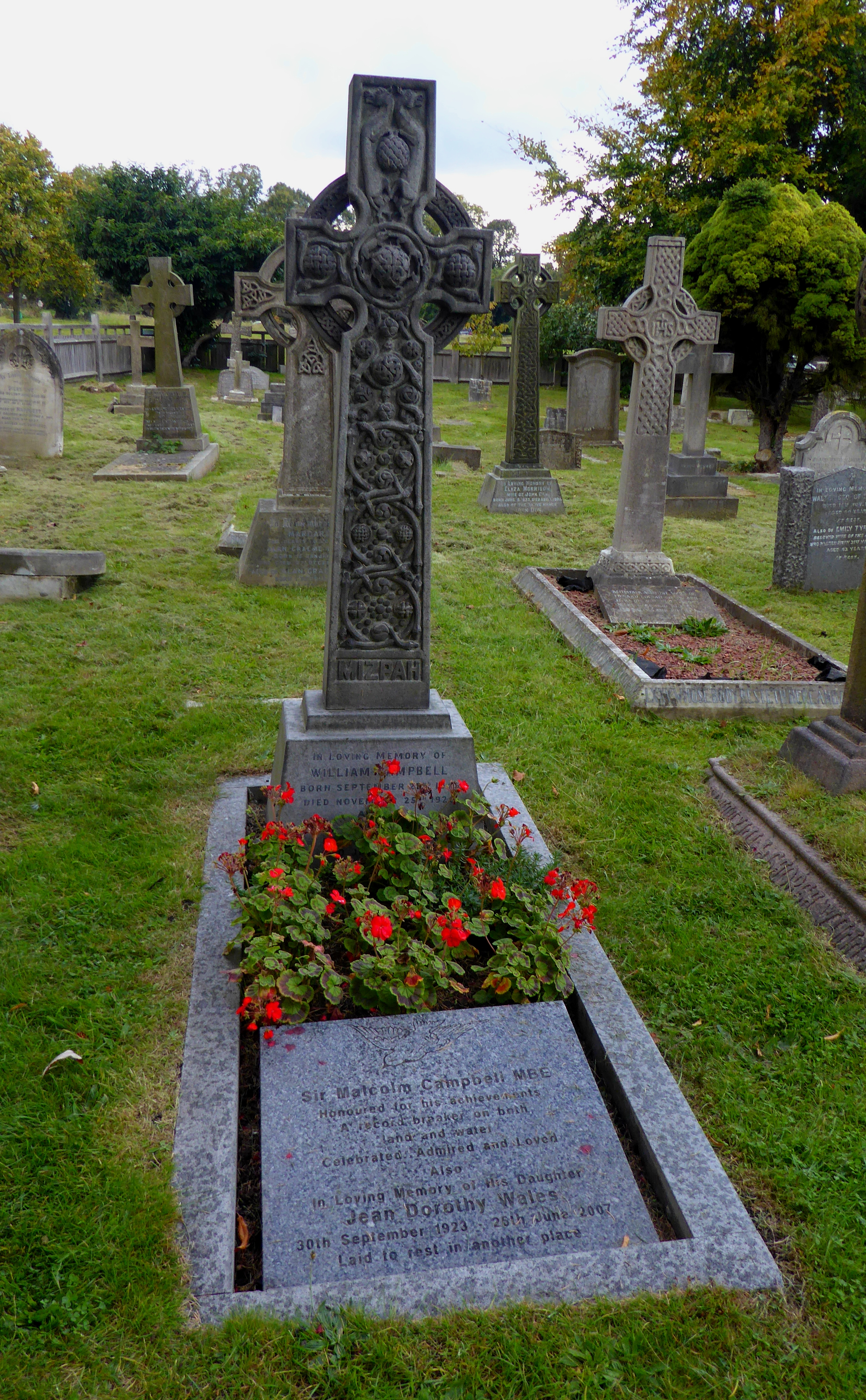
Campbell's grave at St Nicholas' Church in Chislehurst

Campbell died after a series of strokes in 1948 in Reigate, Surrey, aged 63.

== Honours and awards ==
- In recognition of his service during the First World War, Campbell was appointed a Member of the Military Division of the Order of the British Empire on 3 June 1919.
- In 1931, on his return from Daytona Beach where he set a land speed record of 245.736 mph (395.474 km/h), he was given a civic welcome and a Mansion House banquet in London, and was knighted at Buckingham Palace by King George V on 21 February 1931.
- He was awarded the Segrave Trophy in 1933 and 1939.
- He was inducted into the International Motorsports Hall of Fame in 1990.
- He was inducted into the Motorsports Hall of Fame of America in 1994.
- In 2010, an English Heritage blue plaque commemorating Campbell and his son was installed at Canbury School, Kingston Hill, Kingston upon Thames, where Donald was born in March 1921 and the Campbell family lived until late 1922.
